= Golden age of alpinism =

Decade in mountaineering (1854–1865)

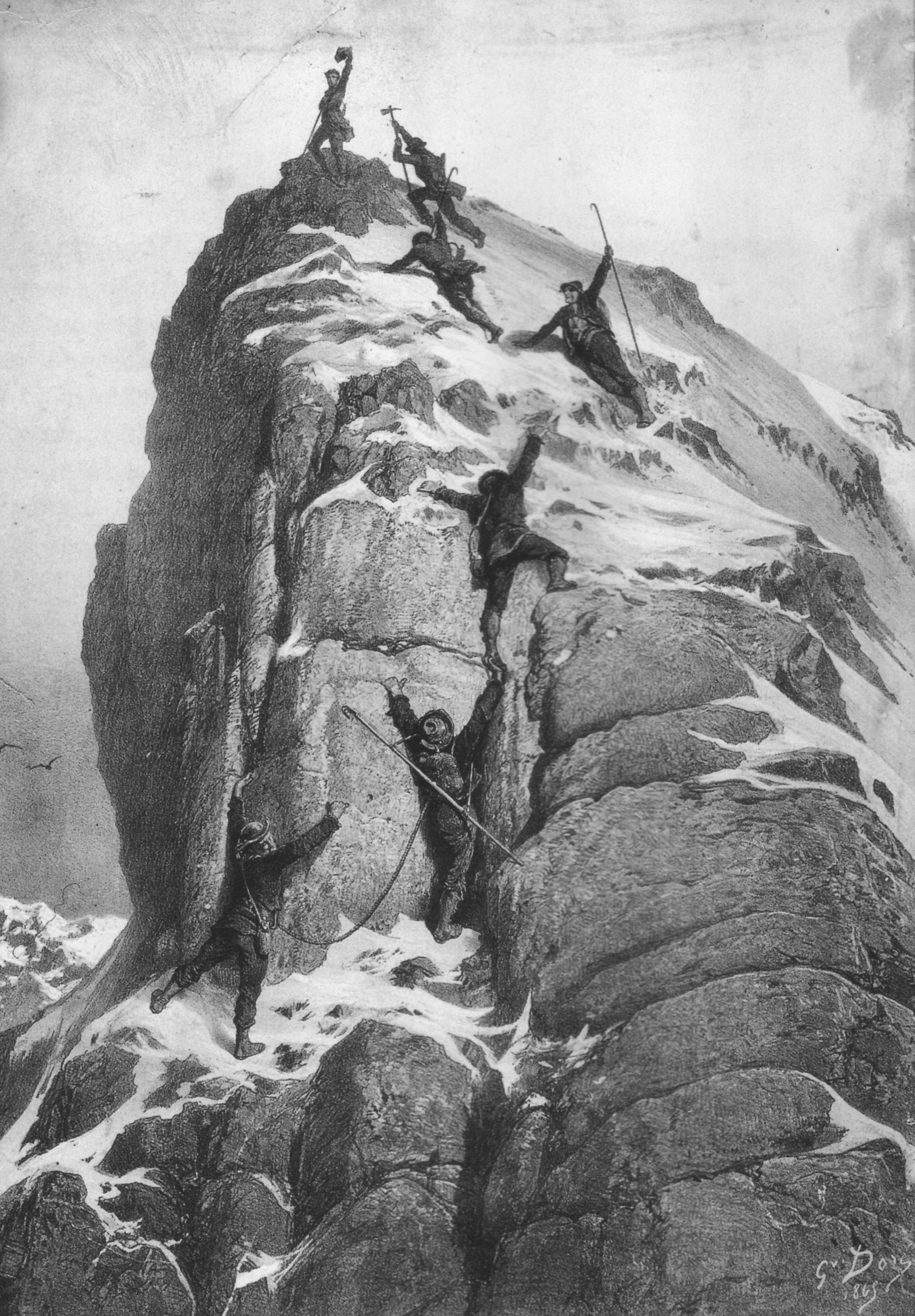
The First Ascent of the Matterhorn, by Gustave Doré. This ascent, by Edward Whymper and party in 1865, traditionally marks the end of the golden age of alpinism.

The golden age of alpinism was the decade in mountaineering between Alfred Wills's ascent of the Wetterhorn in 1854 and Edward Whymper's ascent of the Matterhorn in 1865, during which many major peaks in the Alps saw their first ascents.

== Prominent figures ==
With its beginning slightly predating the formation of the Alpine Club in London in 1857, the golden age was dominated by British alpinists and their Swiss and French guides. Prominent figures of the period include Lord Francis Douglas, Paul Grohmann, Florence Crauford Grove, Charles Hudson, E. S. Kennedy, William Mathews, A. W. Moore, John Ball, Leslie Stephen, Francis Fox Tuckett, John Tyndall, Horace Walker and Edward Whymper. Well-known guides of the era include Christian Almer, Jakob Anderegg, Melchior Anderegg, Johann Joseph Bennen, Peter Bohren, Jean-Antoine Carrel, Michel Croz, Ulrich Kaufmann and Johannes Zumtaugwald. Lucy Walker, sister of Horace, attained some notable firsts during the period, including the first ascent of the Balmhorn (1864), and later several first female ascents.

In the early years of the "golden age", scientific pursuits were intermixed with the sport. More often than not, the mountaineers carried a variety of instruments up the mountain with them to be used for scientific observations. The physicist John Tyndall was the most prominent of the scientists. Among the non-scientist mountaineers, the literary critic Leslie Stephen was the most prominent. In the later years of the "golden age", the non-scientist pure sportsmen came to dominate the London-based Alpine Club and alpine mountaineering overall.

== First ascents in the golden age ==
- 1854 Königspitze, Ostspitze (Monte Rosa), Strahlhorn
- 1855 Mont Blanc du Tacul, Westspitze (Monte Rosa), Weissmies
- 1856 Aiguille du Midi, Allalinhorn, Lagginhorn
- 1857 Mönch, Monte Pelmo
- 1858 Dom, Eiger, Hinterer Brochkogel, Nadelhorn, Piz Morteratsch, Vorderer Brochkogel, Wildstrubel
- 1859 Aletschhorn, Bietschhorn, Grand Combin, Grivola, Rimpfischhorn, Hochalmspitze, Monte Leone
- 1860 Alphubel, Blüemlisalphorn, Civetta, Gran Paradiso, Grande Casse
- 1861 Castor, Fluchthorn, Lyskamm, Mont Pourri, Monte Viso, Schreckhorn, Weisshorn, Weißkugel
- 1862 Dent Blanche, Dent Parrachée, Doldenhorn, Gross Fiescherhorn, Monte Disgrazia, Ramolkogel, Täschhorn, Zuckerhütl
- 1863 Antelao, Bifertenstock, Dent d'Hérens, Parrotspitze, Piz Zupò, Tofane
- 1864 Adamello, Aiguille d'Argentière, Aiguille de Tré la Tête, Balmhorn, Barre des Écrins, Dammastock, Gross Wannenhorn, Marmolata, Mont Dolent, Pollux, Presanella, Sorapiss, Zinalrothorn
- 1865 Aiguille Verte, Grand Cornier, Großer Möseler, Hochfeiler, La Ruinette, Matterhorn, Monte Cristallo, Ober Gabelhorn, Piz Buin, Piz Roseg

== See also ==
- List of first ascents
- Exploration of the High Alps
- Silver age of alpinism

== Sources ==
- Hermann Alexander Berlepsch (1861), The Alps; or, Sketches of life and nature in the mountains (English translated from German by Leslie Stephen).
- Trevor Braham (2004), When the Alps Cast Their Spell: Mountaineers of the Golden Age of Alpinism (publisher: In Pinn)
- Ronald Clark (1953), The Victorian Mountaineers (220 pages).
- John Tyndall, (1871), Hours of Exercise in the Alps (475 pages).
