= Charles Edward Mathews =

English mountaineer

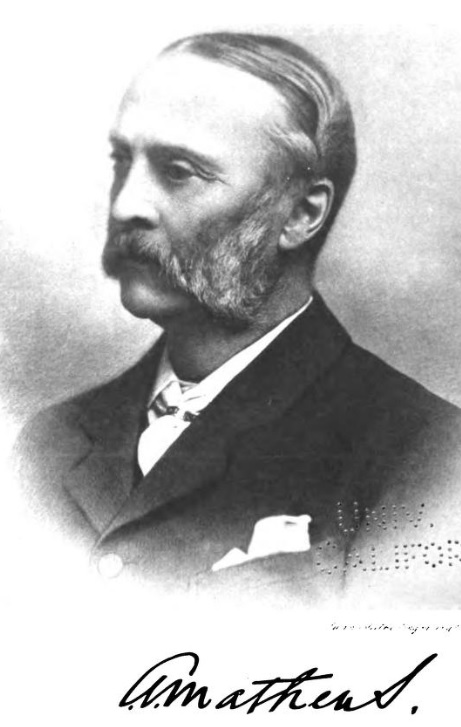
- Born: 4 January 1834; Kidderminster, UK
- Died: 20 October 1905 (aged 71); Edgbaston, Birmingham, UK
- Occupation: Solicitor
- Known for: Founding member and President of the Alpine Club

Charles Edward Mathews (4 January 1834 – 20 October 1905) was an English mountaineer, a leading member of the Alpine Club and writer on mountaineering. In his professional career as solicitor he was active in public affairs in Birmingham.

== Life ==
Mathews was born in Kidderminster, the third of six sons of Jeremiah Mathews, a Worcestershire land agent, and his wife Mary Guest. Of his five brothers, the eldest, William Mathews (1828–1901) was one of the leading pioneers of Alpine exploration and was president of the Alpine Club from 1869 to 1871. The fourth brother, George Spencer Mathews (1836–1904), was also a noted mountaineer. Both brothers were prominent figures in municipal and social life in Birmingham.

=== Professional career ===
Mathews was educated at King Charles I School, Kidderminster, served his articles in Birmingham and London from 1851, and was admitted solicitor in 1856. He practised in Birmingham, acted as solicitor to the Birmingham School Board throughout its existence, and as Clerk of the Peace from 1891 till his death. He was a member of the town council from 1875 to 1881 and for nearly fifty years exerted much influence on the public and social affairs of Birmingham. One of the founders and subsequently chairman of the parliamentary committee of the National Education League, he founded in 1864 the Birmingham Children's Hospital, in conjunction with Thomas Pretious Heslop, and took part for many years in its management; he set on foot the agitation which led to the reorganisation of King Edward's School, and served as a governor of the school from its reconstitution in 1878 till his death; a lifelong friend of Joseph Chamberlain, he was from 1886 one of the local leaders of the Liberal Unionist Party.

=== Mountaineering ===
He was introduced to the Alps in 1856 by his brother William, with whom the idea of forming the Alpine Club originated; and the foundation of the club was definitely decided upon in November 1857 by the two brothers, a cousin, Benjamin Attwood Mathews, and Edward Shirley Kennedy; the last, aided by Thomas Woodbine Hinchliff, taking the leading share in its actual formation (December 1857 to January 1858).

Mathews played his part in the exploration of the High Alps that followed during the succeeding decade, and he continued to climb vigorously for more than forty years, long after all the other original members of the Alpine Club had retired from serious mountaineering. He was president of the club from 1878 to 1880, and took a prominent part in its affairs until the last year of his life. He was also one of the founders (1898) and the first president of the Climbers' Club, an association formed with the object of encouraging mountaineering in England and Ireland.

He died in Edgbaston on 20 October 1905, and was buried at Sutton Coldfield. Mathews married in 1860 Elizabeth Agnes Blyth, and had two sons and two daughters.

== Writings ==
Besides numerous papers in the Alpine Journal (volumes i–xxii) Mathews contributed articles about the guides Melchior Anderegg and Jakob Anderegg to Pioneers of the Alps (1887), and a retrospective chapter to C. T. Dent's Mountaineering in the Badminton Library (1892); but his most important work in Alpine literature is The Annals of Mont Blanc (1898), an exhaustive monograph, containing a critical analysis of the original narratives of the early ascents of tho mountain, and a history and description of all the later routes by which its summit has been reached. Mathews himself climbed it at least twelve times.

== Legacy ==
A monument to Mathews was erected in the garden of the Hotel Couttet in Chamonix and it was unveiled in 1907. The hotel closed in 1946 and in 2024 the monument was refurbished, relocated and re-dedicated in a new location in Couttet Park, Chamonix.

== See also ==
- Golden age of alpinism
