= Edward Shirley Kennedy =

English mountaineer and author

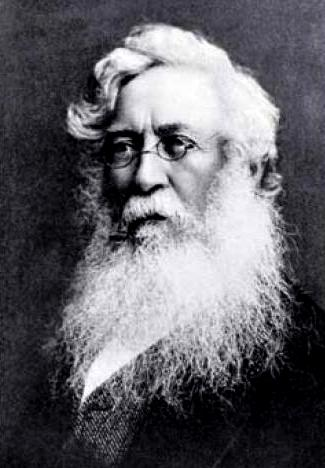
Edward Shirley Kennedy

Edward Shirley Kennedy (usually known as E. S. Kennedy) (1817–1898) was an English mountaineer and author, and a founding member of the Alpine Club.

== Early life ==
Kennedy was a gentleman of independent means, who attended Caius College, Cambridge as a Fellow-Commoner in his mid-thirties.

== Founding of the Alpine Club ==
During an ascent of the Finsteraarhorn on 13 August 1857, Kennedy discussed the formation of a national mountaineering club with William Mathews, who had corresponded with F. J. A. Hort about the idea in February 1857. At the end of that year, Kennedy was chairman of the meeting at which the Alpine Club was founded (the meeting was attended by twenty of the leading British alpinists of the day, and was held at Ashley's Hotel in London on 22 December 1857). Kennedy was made Vice-President, with John Ball as President and T. W. Hinchliff as Secretary.

Kennedy served as President of the Club between 1860 and 1863.

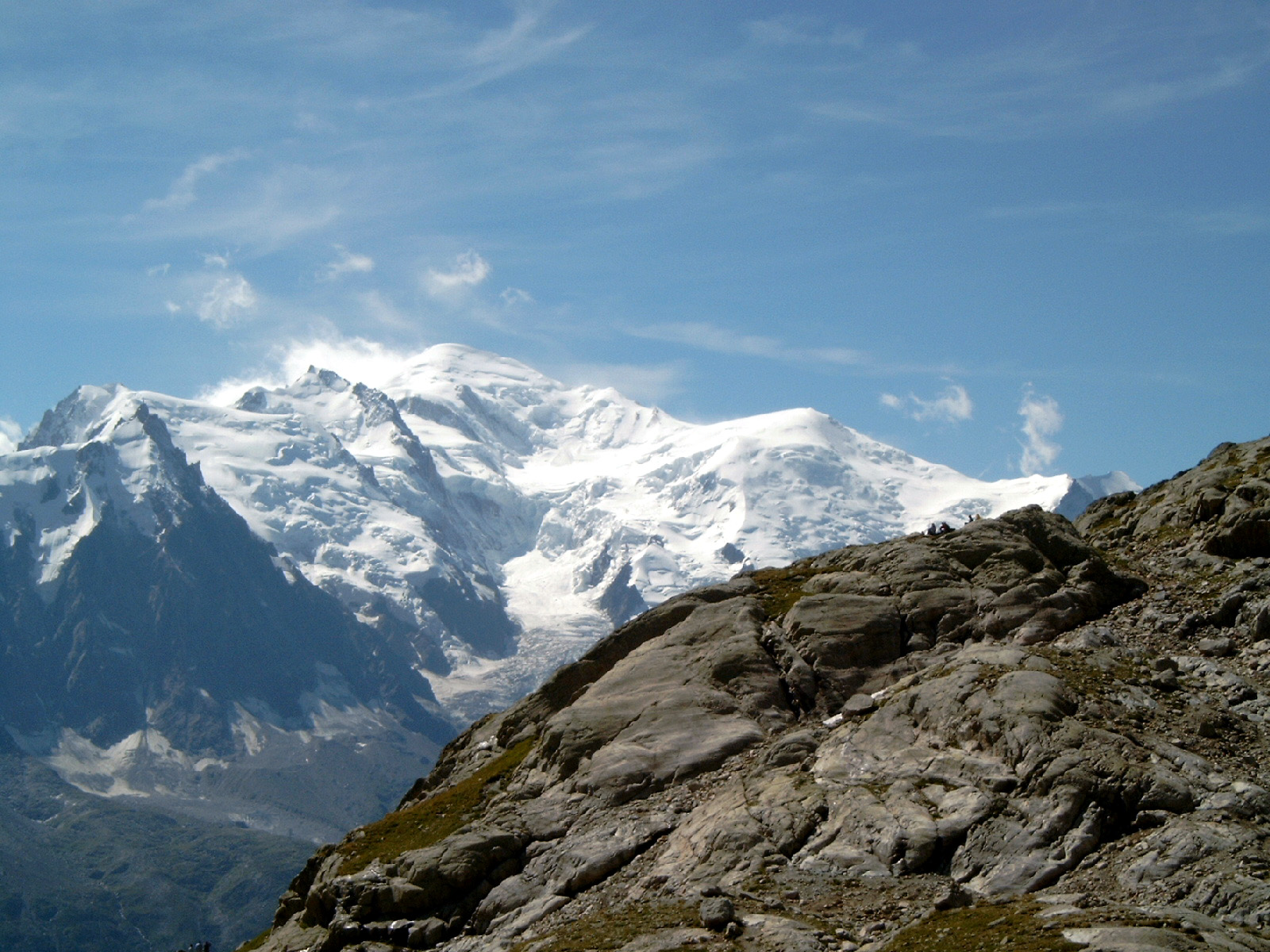
Mont Blanc. The Goûter ridge, partially climbed by Kennedy and party, takes the centre skyline.

A wood engraving by Edward Whymper of The Alpine Club at Zermatt in 1864 shows Kennedy with John Ball, William Mathews, T. G. Bonney, John Tyndall, Alfred Wills (the Alpine Club's third president), and Ulrich Lauener. Kennedy appears as a man of above average height, with a full beard, carrying a long plain wooden staff, several inches taller than himself.

== Alpinism ==
In 1854 Kennedy attempted the unclimbed Dom – the highest mountain entirely within Switzerland – with Saas-Fee priest and hotel owner Abbé Joseph Imseng and two Swiss guides, but the guides were unwilling to tackle a particularly tricky passage, although both Kennedy and Imseng were happy to continue. Together with Charles Hudson, Kennedy was one of the earliest practitioners of climbing without guides in the Alps, climbing Mont Blanc du Tacul and Mont Blanc (by a new route) in guideless parties.

Kennedy was the editor of the second series of Peaks, Passes, and Glaciers (1862). Like the first series (1858), this was a collection of papers (in two volumes) published by the Alpine Club; these were the forerunners of the Alpine Journal, which first appeared in 1863. Kennedy was also active in discussions concerning modification to the traditional ice axe, proposing a design based on the American backwoodsman's axe.

== First ascents ==
- Goûter ridge (incomplete) of Mont Blanc in 1854 with Charles Hudson and party
- Mont Blanc du Tacul (first official ascent) on 5 August 1855 with Charles Hudson, Edward John Stevenson, Christopher and James Grenville Smyth, Charles Ainslie and G. C. Joad
- Fuorcla Crast' Agüzza. Kennedy, together with J. F. Hardy, and guides P. and F. Jenny and A. Flury, were the first to reach this col (although they did not traverse it) on 23 July 1861.
- Monte Disgrazia on 23 August 1862 with Leslie Stephen and Thomas Cox, and guide Melchior Anderegg

== Bibliography ==
- Edward Shirley Kennedy, Thoughts on Being: suggested by meditation upon the Infinite, the Immaterial, and the Eternal (1850)
- Edward Shirley Kennedy and Charles Hudson, Where there's a Will there's a Way: An Ascent of Mont Blanc by a New Route and without Guides, London: Longman, Brown, Green, and Longmans, 1856. Reprinted by Kessinger Publishers, June 2007, ISBN 1-4326-9230-5
- Edward Shirley Kennedy (ed.), Peaks, Passes, and Glaciers: Being Excursions by Members of the Alpine Club. (2 vols.), London: Longman, Green, Longman, and Roberts, 1862. Vol. 1, 8 maps, 22 wood engravings (5 full page), pp. 445; Vol. 2, 6 maps, 34 wood engravings (7 full page), pp. 541
- Edward Shirley Kennedy, 'The Ascent of Monte della Disgrazia', in The Alpine Journal: A Record of Mountain Adventure and Scientific Observation by Members of the Alpine Club, Vol. 1, No. 1. ed. Hereford Brooke George, London, Longmans, 2 March 1863

== Note ==
E. S. Kennedy should not be confused with T. S. Kennedy of Leeds, an alpinist who made several first ascents during the same period (e.g. Dent Blanche (1862), Moine ridge of the Aiguille Verte (1865)).
