= Thomas Woodbine Hinchliff =

English mountaineer, traveller, and author

Thomas Woodbine Hinchliff (5 December 1825 – 8 May 1882) was an English mountaineer, traveller, and author, from 1875 to 1877 the seventh President of the Alpine Club.

After qualifying as a barrister, Hinchliff abandoned the law and took to a life of travelling and writing. His books include Summer Months among the Alps (1857), South American Sketches (1863), and Over the Sea and Far Away (1876).

== Early life ==
Born at Southwark, Hinchliffe was the son of Chamberlain Hinchliff (1780–1856), of Croom's Hill, Greenwich, and Lee, both then in Kent, by his marriage in 1824 to Sarah Parish, a daughter of Woodbine Parish of Bawburgh in Norfolk, the sister of Sir Woodbine Parish (1796–1882), a traveller and diplomat. Hinchliff was educated at the West Ham Grammar School, Blackheath Proprietary School, and Trinity College, Cambridge, graduating BA in 1849, when he became a member of Lincoln's Inn. Three years later he proceeded MA at Cambridge and was called to the bar, but did not pursue a career as a barrister.

In 1856, his father died.

== Career ==
Hinchliff was a minor figure of the golden age of alpinism, between Wills's ascent of the Wetterhorn in 1854 and Whymper's conquest of the Matterhorn in 1865. In 1857 he was a founding member of the Alpine Club, the club meeting in his Lincoln's Inn chambers before it leased rooms of its own at 8 St Martin's Place, Trafalgar Square in 1859. John Ball was elected the club's first President, with E. S. Kennedy as Vice-President and Hinchliff as Secretary. In 1857 Hinchliffe published Summer Months Among the Alps: With the Ascent of Monte Rosa, a work which some twenty years later Mark Twain referred to as "Hinchliffe's book". In his A Tramp Abroad (1880), Twain's narrator advises his friend Harris to read this book to learn about mountain climbing, and a description in it of a fall influences the course of Twain's story.

With Leslie Stephen and the guide Melchior Anderegg, Hinchliff made an early ascent of the Wildstrubel on 11 September 1858 and the first ascent of the Alphubel on 9 August 1860.

In 1861, Hinchliff visited South America, staying with his cousin Frank Parish, the British Consul in Buenos Aires. He spent some months on extensive travels in Brazil and Argentina, with expeditions into the Serra dos Órgãos, Teresópolis, Petrópolis, and Juiz de Fora, and these were recounted in his South American Sketches of 1863. In 1873 he set off to travel around the world with a friend named William Henry Rawson, and in two years they crossed some 35,000 miles of ocean while spending a further six months on land. Shortly after his return to England in 1875, Hinchliff was elected President of the Alpine Club, and in 1876 he published Over the Sea and Far Away, an account of his journey around the world. Describing his sad thoughts on the view of Tupungato and Aconcagua from Santiago, Hinchliff reflected that

... endless successions of men must in all probability be forever debarred from their lofty crests... those who, like Major Godwin Austen, have had all the advantages of experience and acclimatization to aid them in attacks upon the higher Himalayas, agree that 21,000 ft is near the limit at which man ceases to be capable of the slightest further exertion.

Hinchliff died suddenly at Aix-les-Bains, France, on 8 May 1882. A monument to him stands on the northwest side of the Riffelalp resort in Switzerland. His obituary in the Alpine Journal said he had had "a kind of genius for friendship", while the Proceedings of the Royal Geographical Society noted that "the Society loses a member who, if not an explorer, was an indefatigable traveller". In 1910, a climbing anthology called him "one of the first to penetrate the higher solitudes of the world of ice and snow".

== Works ==
- Summer Months among the Alps: with the ascent of Monte Rosa (London: Longman, Brown, Green, Longmans & Roberts, 1857)
- 'The Wildstrubel and Oldenhorn', in Peaks, passes, and glaciers: a series of excursions by members of the Alpine Club (London: 1860, pp. 228–246)
- South American Sketches; or a Visit to Rio Janeiro, The Organ Mountains, La Plata, and the Parana (London: Longman, Green, Longman, Roberts, & Green, 1863)
  - Brasilien och Plata-staterna: reseanteckningar (Stockholm: L. J. Hiertas, 1864, translation of South American Sketches into Swedish)
- 'The Italian Lakes', chapter of Picturesque Europe, vol. I (1875)
- Over the Sea and Far Away, a narrative of wanderings round the world (London: Longman, Green, and Co., 1876)
- Hobbes (London: Macmillan and Co., Ltd., 1904)
