= Michel Croz =

French mountain guide

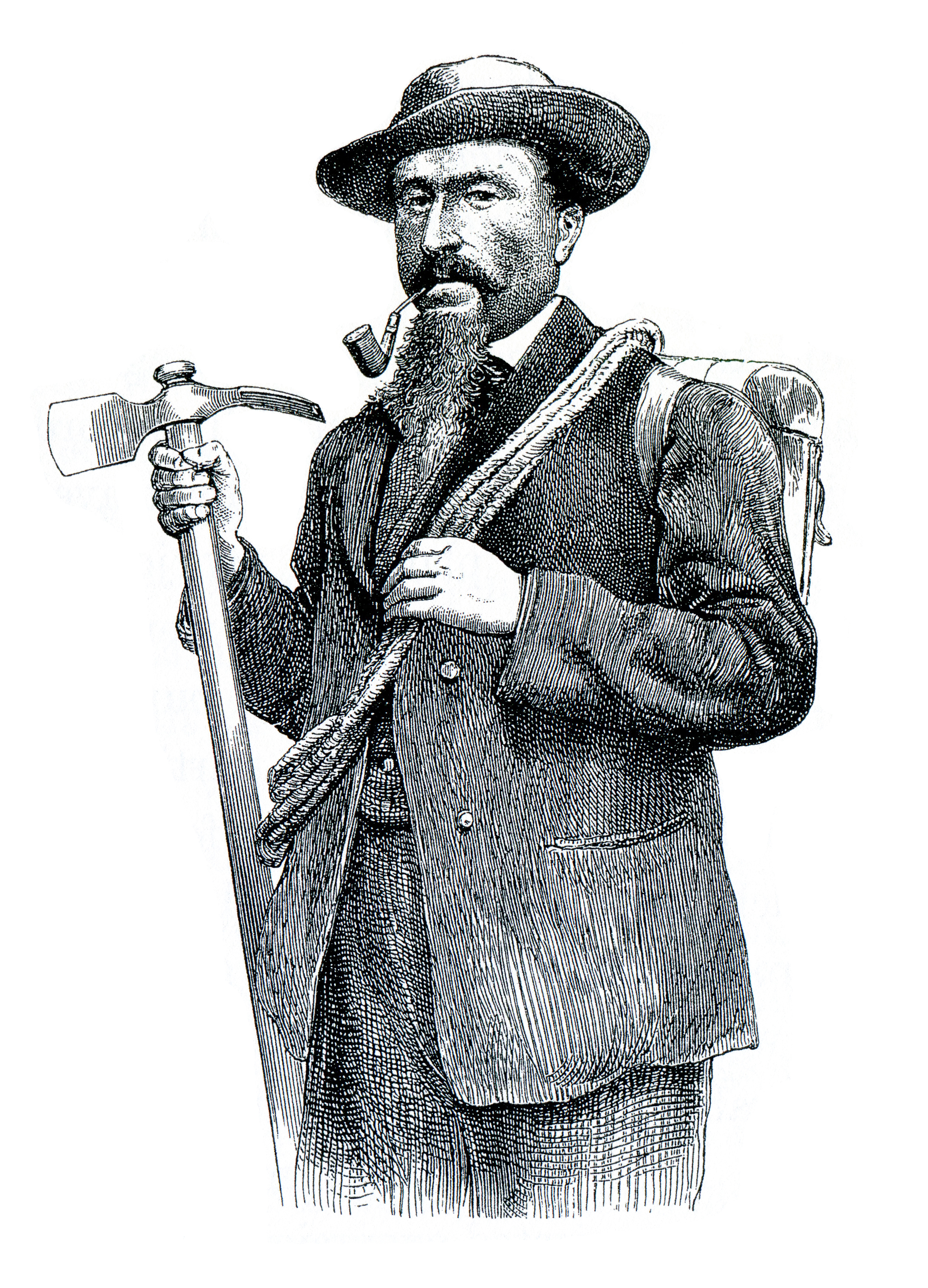
- Whymper's engraving of Michel Croz, 1865
- Born: Michel Auguste Croz; 22 April 1830; Le Tour, Chamonix, France
- Died: 14 July 1865 (aged 35); Matterhorn, Switzerland
- Occupation: Mountain guide
- Known for: Matterhorn first ascent

Michel Auguste Croz (Arpitan: Mechiél Ôgusto Crox; 22 April 1830 – 14 July 1865) was a Chamoniard mountain guide and the first ascentionist of many mountains in the western Alps during the golden age of alpinism. He is chiefly remembered for his death on the first ascent of the Matterhorn and for his climbing partnership (as a guide) with Edward Whymper.

== Career as a guide ==
Croz began his guiding career in 1859 when he was engaged by William Mathews for an ascent of Mont Blanc. As well as making the first ascent of some of the most significant unclimbed mountains in the Alps – the Grande Casse, Monte Viso, the Barre des Écrins and the Aiguille d'Argentière – he also made the first traverse of many previously uncrossed cols, including the col des Ecrins, the col du Sélé and the col du Glacier Blanc in the Massif des Écrins (all in 1862 with Francis Fox Tuckett, Peter Perren and Bartolomméo Peyrotte). In 1863, he climbed the Grandes Rousses with William Mathews, Thomas George Bonney and his brother Jean-Baptiste Croz, and in 1864 he made the first traverse of the brèche de la Meije and the first traverse of the col de la Pilatte (with Edward Whymper, Horace Walker, A. W. Moore and Saas-Fee guide Christian Almer). Of the latter expedition, Whymper was later to write,

I cannot close this chapter without paying tribute to the ability with which Croz led us, through a dense mist, down the remainder of the Glacier de la Pilatte. As an exhibition of strength and skill, it has seldom been surpassed in the Alps or elsewhere. On this almost unknown and very steep glacier, he was perfectly at home, even in the mists. Never able to see 50 feet ahead, he still went on with utmost certainty, and without having to retrace a single step; and displayed from first to last consummate knowledge of the materials with which he was dealing.

== Matterhorn accident ==
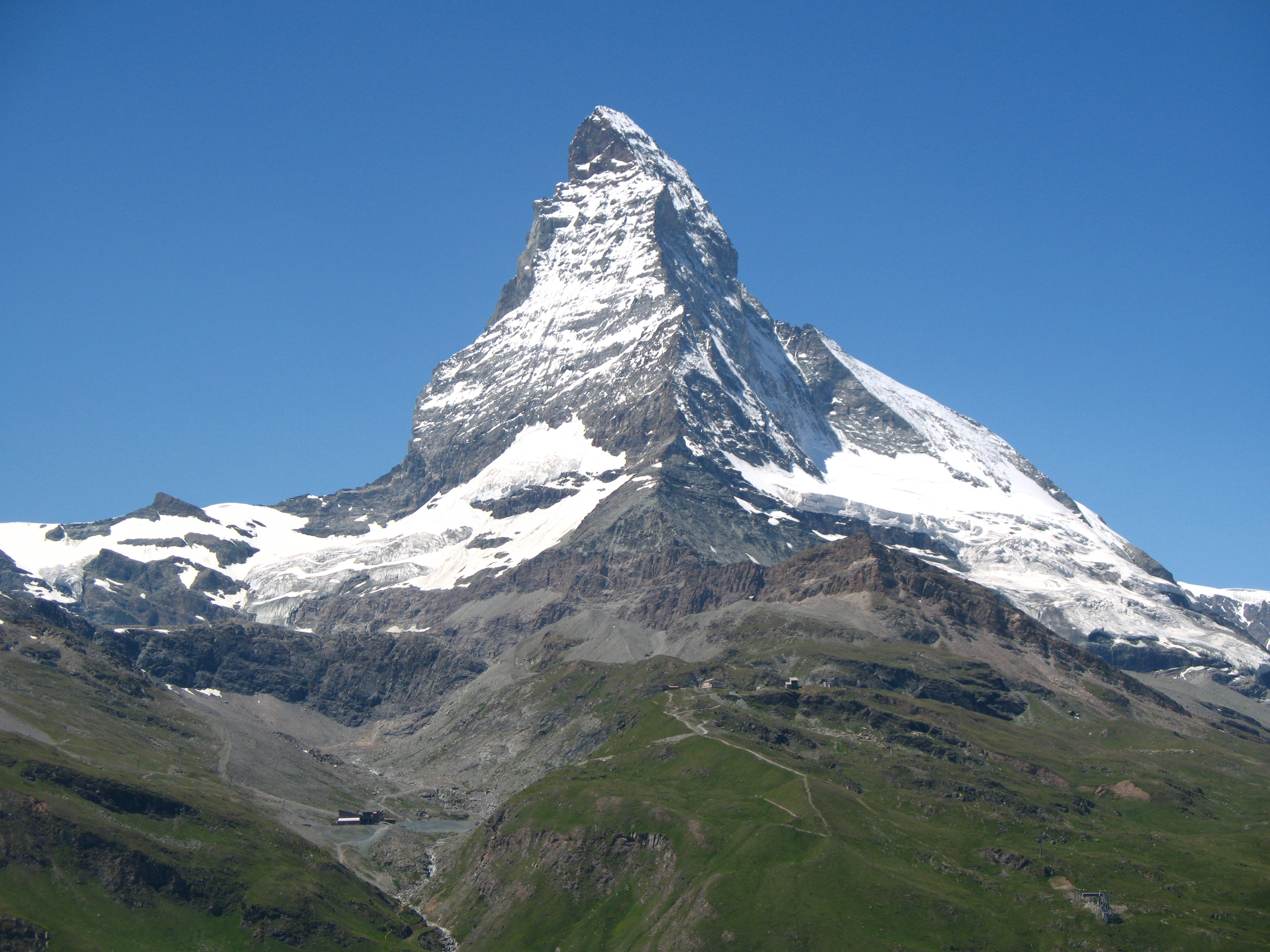
The fatal accident on the Matterhorn occurred on the sunny snow slopes at the top right of the mountain.

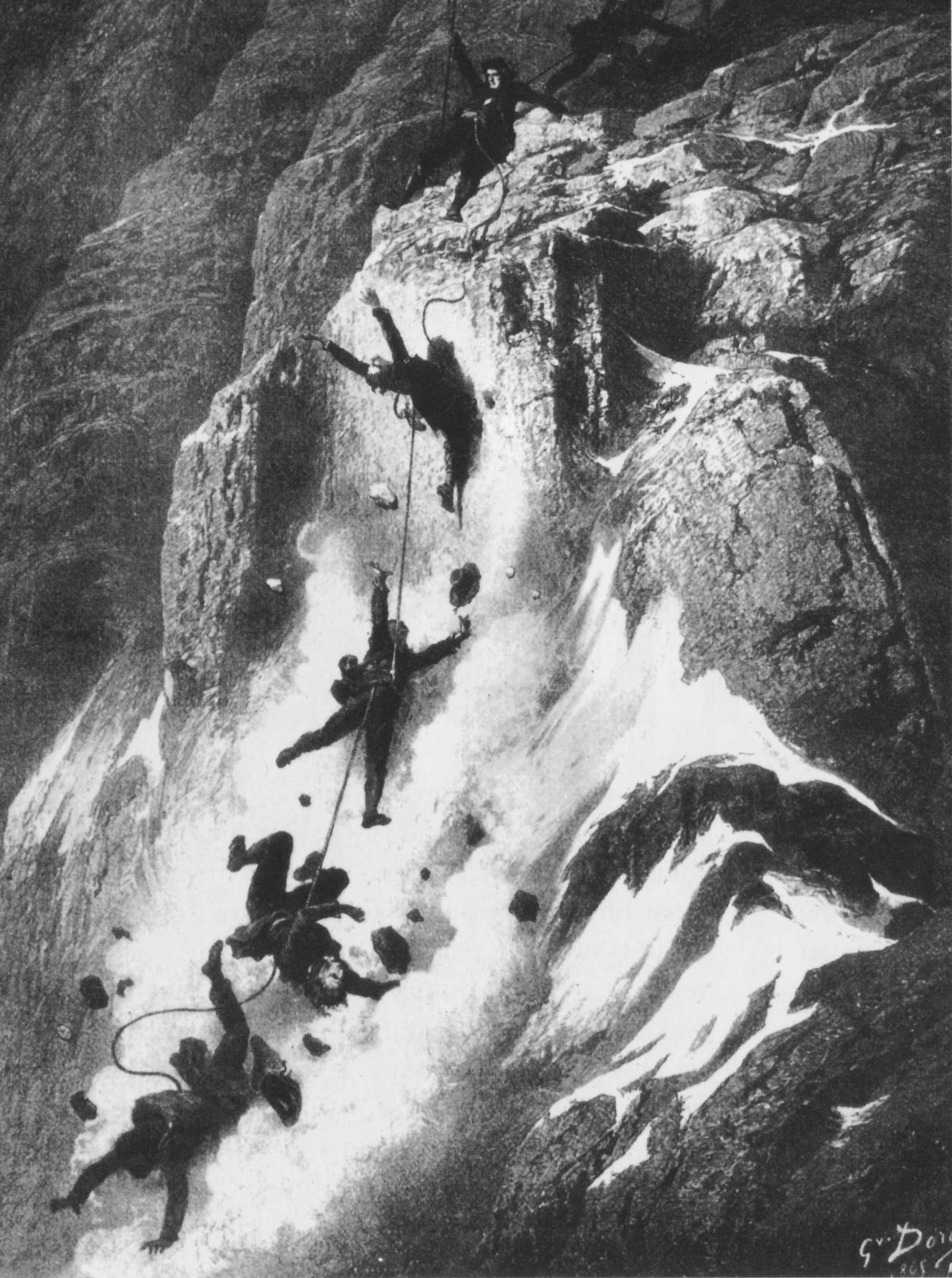
The accident on the Matterhorn, triggered by Hadow, in an engraving by Gustave Doré. Hadow is second from the bottom, with Croz below him. The snapped rope above Hudson and Douglas is clearly seen.

Following eight failed attempts on the Matterhorn starting from 1861, Whymper was recalled to London in the summer of 1864 and offered the services of Croz to his friend Adams-Reilly, advising him to make an attempt on the mountain (all three had been in a party that had made the first ascent of Mont Dolent that year). This never came to anything, and the next year Croz was again employed by Whymper. Together with Christian Almer and Franz Biner they made the first ascent of the Grand Cornier, and the first ascent of Pointe Whymper on the Grandes Jorasses.

On the Matterhorn, Croz and Whymper tried a route via a couloir on the south-east face but were unsuccessful. Croz then had to fulfil an engagement with Charles Hudson, during which – together with T. S. Kennedy – they made the first ascent of the Moine ridge of the Aiguille Verte, whilst Whymper attempted to join forces with the Valtournenche guide Jean-Antoine Carrel. When this proved impossible (Carrel instead leading an Italian party on an attempt on the Italian ridge of the mountain), Whymper teamed up with Lord Francis Douglas and the two Zermatt guides, Peter Taugwalder father and son. Eventually this party decided to share the attempt on their common objective of the Hörnli ridge with Croz and Hudson, who had been joined by Hudson's protégé – the young, inexperienced and badly shod Douglas Hadow.

After this party of seven successfully made the first ascent of the Matterhorn on 14 July 1865, the order on the rope during the descent was Croz going down first, followed by Hadow, then Hudson, Douglas, old Peter Taugwalder and Whymper, with young Peter Taugwalder bringing up the rear. According to Claire Engel,

At each step [on the descent] Croz had to make Hadow's feet secure, and to do so he had to lay down his ice axe so that he had no support himself. Suddenly, while Croz was turning round to continue the descent, after having made Hadow secure, Hadow slipped and both of his feet struck Croz in the back. The guide lost his footing and fell headlong down the steep slope, dragging the boy with him. Hudson came next, then Douglas; none had time to react.

The rope (an old, thin and worn line) between Douglas and old Peter Taugwalder snapped, saving the remaining three members of the party – Taugwalder father and son, and Whymper. Croz's body, together with those of Hudson and Hadow (but not Douglas), were recovered from the Matterhorn glacier. Croz was buried in the south side of Zermatt churchyard, on the other side from the graves of Hudson and Hadow. Whymper wrote: 'The inscription that is placed upon his tomb truthfully records that he was beloved by his comrades and esteemed by travellers.' Whymper subsequently 'had to see to the fund for Croz's widow and he took on, later on, much care over a suitable memorial for the man who had been, despite occasional differences, undoubtedly his favourite guide.'

== First ascents ==
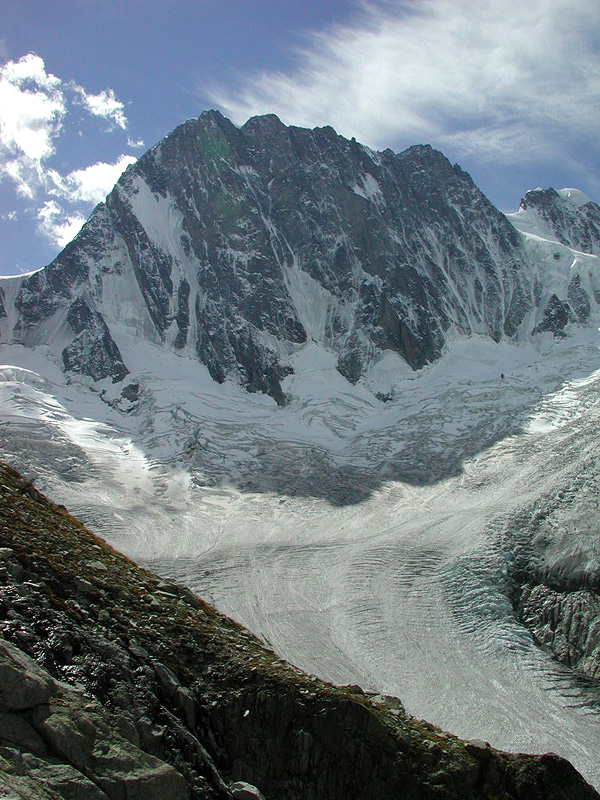
The Grandes Jorasses. Pointe Walker, Pointe Whymper and Pointe Croz (left to right). The Croz Spur is the buttress (centre right) on the north face that leads to Pointe Croz.

- Grande Casse with William Mathews and E. Favre on 8 August 1860
- Castor with F. W. Jacomb and William Mathews on 23 August 1861
- Monte Viso with F. W. Jacomb and William Mathews on 30 August 1861
- Barre des Écrins with A. W. Moore, Horace Walker, Edward Whymper, Christian Almer the elder and Christian Almer the younger on 25 June 1864
- Mont Dolent with by A. Reilly, Edward Whymper, H. Charlet and M. Payot on 9 July 1864
- Aiguille d'Argentière with A. Reilly, Edward Whymper, H. Charlet and M. Payot on 15 July 1864
- Grand Cornier with Edward Whymper, Christian Almer and Franz Biner on 16 June 1865
- Pointe Whymper on the Grandes Jorasses with Edward Whymper, Christian Almer and Franz Biner on 24 June 1865
- Moine ridge of the Aiguille Verte (second ascent of the mountain) with Charles Hudson and T. S. Kennedy in July 1865
- Matterhorn with Lord Francis Douglas, Douglas Hadow, Charles Hudson, Edward Whymper, Peter Taugwalder father and son on 14 July 1865

== Commemoration ==
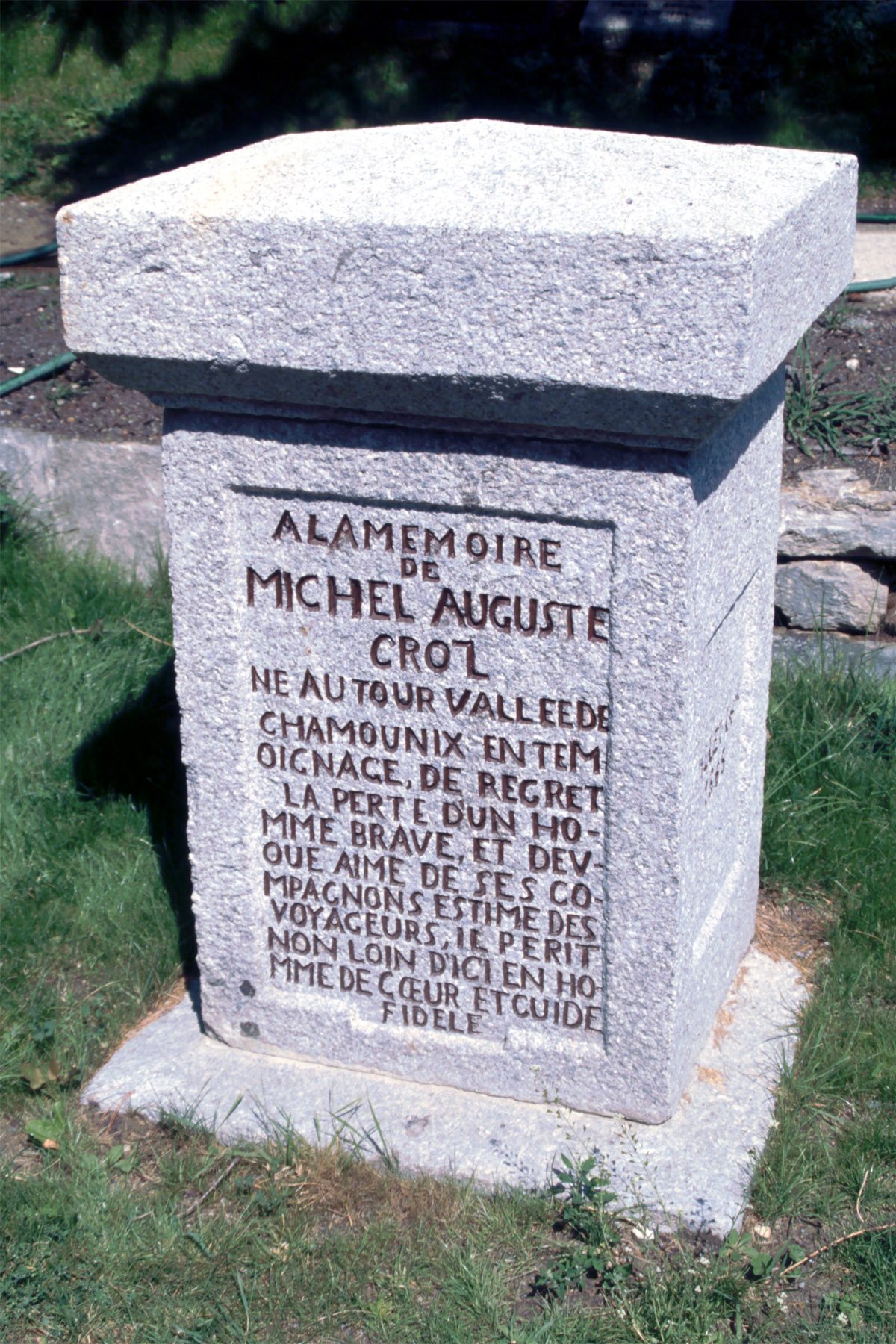
Grave

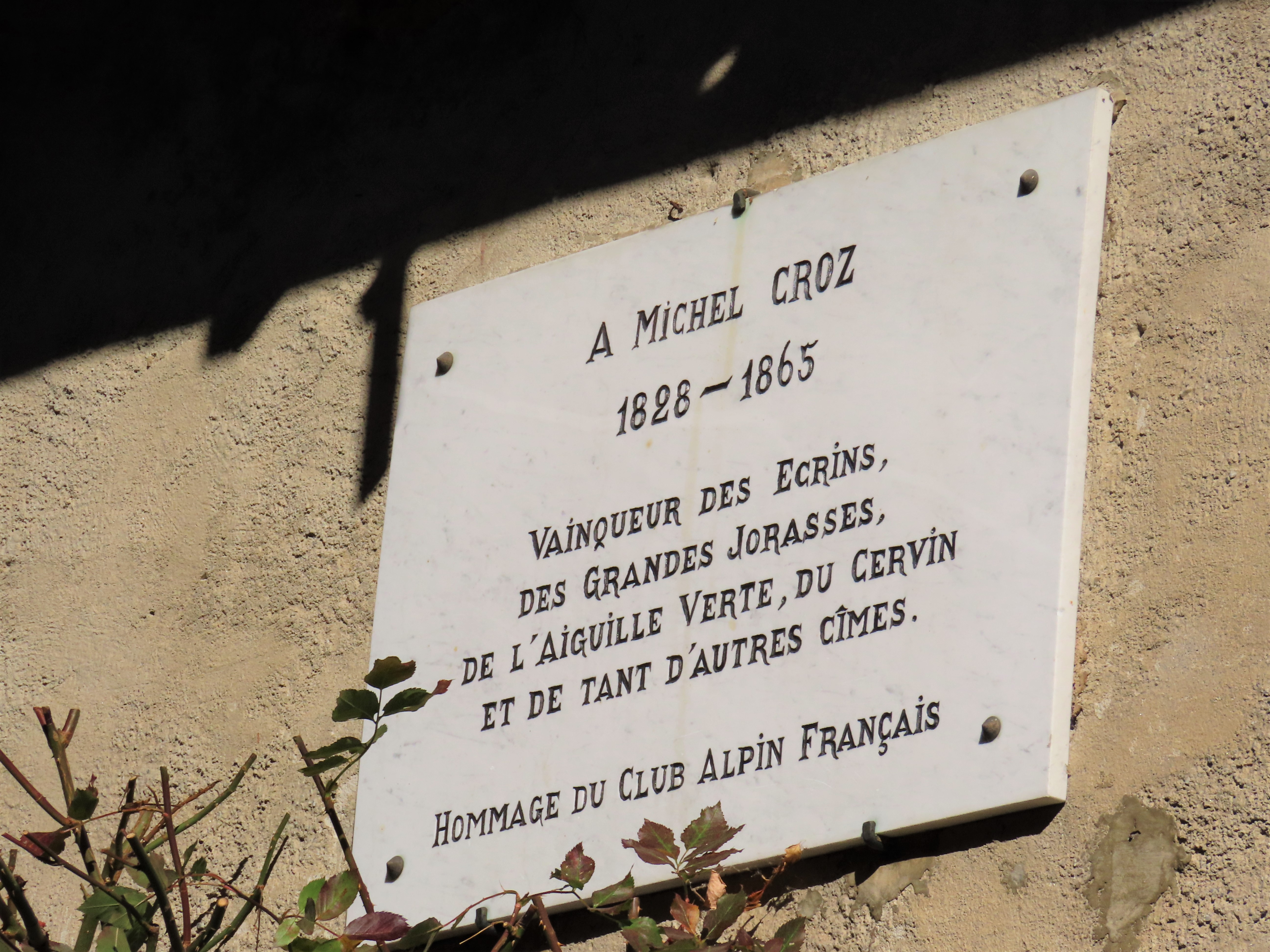
Memorial plaque erected by the Club alpin français in Le Tour (Chamonix-Mont-Blanc)

Pointe Croz (4,110 m), a summit on the Grandes Jorasses, is named after him. It was first climbed in 1909, 'probably' by Eleonore Hasenclever, Wilhelm Klemm, Felix König and Richard Weitzenböck. The summit gives its name to the Croz Spur (French: l'éperon Croz), a major buttress on the north face of the mountain, one of the great north faces of the Alps. This buttress was first climbed by Martin Meier and Rudolf Peters from 28–29 June 1935.

Croz is commemorated in Chamonix by the avenue Michel Croz, a busy thoroughfare that crosses the river Arve in the centre of the town. One of the oldest buildings in Chamonix, the wooden Salle Michel Croz, was burnt to the ground in a fire on 15 February 1999.
