= Spirit of Mountaineering Commendation =

Alpine Club award given to mountaineers who assist others during crisis

The Spirit of Mountaineering Commendation
- Awarded for: Acknowledges and thanks those who, in the true spirit of mountaineering, have unselfishly given exceptional assistance to those in need of help in the mountains.
- Sponsored by: The Centre for Mountain Medicine at the University of Lancashire
- Date: 2007 - Present
- Presented by: The Alpine Club
- Reward: A framed letter of thanks
- Website: https://alpineclub.org/about/spirit-of-mountaineering

The Spirit of Mountaineering Commendation was established by the Alpine Club in 2007 in order to recognise "unselfish acts in extreme situations in the mountains." It was created in response to a number of high-profile incidents in which mountaineers appeared to have put a successful ascent of a mountain above assisting other climbers in distress.

It has been awarded on three occasions.

== Organisation ==
When the commendation was first established, it was managed by a committee consisting of Norman Croucher, Frank Cannings and John Cleare.

Previous administrators of the commendation include Norman Croucher, John Cleare, Frank Canning and Francoise Call.

The commendation does not operate on a specific timetable. Instead, it is awarded as and when appropriate incidents occur and come to the attention of the commendation committee.

Nominations are submitted using a Google Form that can be accessed via the Alpine Club website.

== Past Recipients ==
=== 2009 - Attempted Annapurna Rescue ===
The first commendation was presented in 2009 at the closing ceremony of the 17th Piolets d'Or. It was presented to six climbers, Simon Anthamatten, Don Bowie, Horia Colibasanu, Alexy Bolotov, Ueli Steck and Denis Urubko for their attempt to rescue Spanish mountaineer Iñaki Ochoa de Olza from 7,400m on the east ridge of Annapurna.

=== 2018 - Rescue of Élisabeth Revol ===
The commendation was presented again at the 2018 Ladek Mountain Festival in Poland, where it was awarded to Adam Bielecki, Denis Urubko, Piotr Tomala and Jarosław Botor after they abandoned their attempt to climb K2 in winter to come to the aid of Tomek Mackiewicz and Élisabeth Revol on Nanga Parbat. While they were able to rescue Revol, administering first aid to her at Camp II and helping her descend to Camp I, from where she was evacuated by helicopter, the Poles judged an attempt to rescue Mackiewicz, who had not descended as far as Revol due to illness, to be too dangerous.

=== 2018 - Multiple Rescues by the 5th Army Aviation High Altitude Squadron ===
The commendation was presented for a second time in 2018, this time to four members of the 5th Army Aviation High Altitude Squadron of the Pakistan Army Aviation Corps: Lt. Col. Muhammad Anjum Rafique, Maj. Fakhar-e-Abbas, Maj. Jehanzeb Qazi and Maj. Muhammad Hussain Hamid. The commendation was given in recognition of several rescues that the squadron had carried out in 2018, including the evacuation of Élisabeth Revol from Nanga Parbat.
