= Alpine Club (UK) =

British sports club founded in London 1857

The Alpine Club
- Formation: 22 December 1857; 168 years ago
- Founded at: London, England, United Kingdom
- Headquarters: 55–56 Charlotte Road, Shoreditch, London, England, United Kingdom
- Website: https://www.alpineclub.org

The Alpine Club was founded in London on 22 December 1857 and is the world's first mountaineering club. The primary focus of the club is to support mountaineers who climb in the Alps and the Greater Ranges of the world's mountains.

== Current activities ==
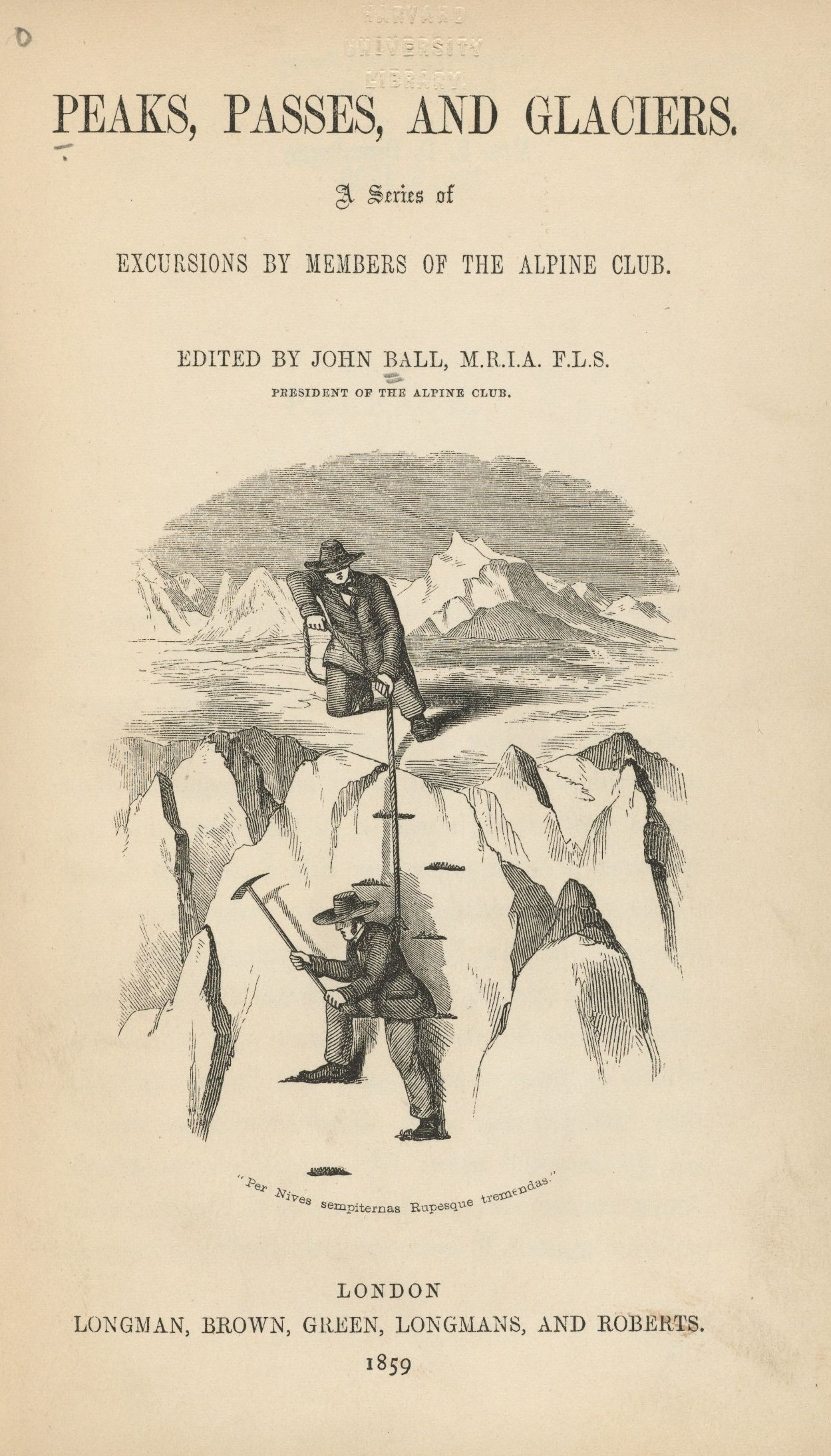
Title page from Peaks, Passes, and Glaciers, 1859, edited by John Ball, first president of the Alpine Club

Though the club organises some UK-based meets and indoor lectures, its primary focus has always tended towards mountaineering overseas. It is associated more with exploratory mountaineering than with purely technical climbing (the early club was once dismissed as doing very little climbing but "a lot of walking steeply uphill"). These higher technical standards were often to be found in offshoots such as the 'Alpine Climbing Group' (ACG), which was founded in 1952 and merged with the Alpine Club in 1967; the ACG is aimed at those "who aspire to establish or repeat technically difficult climbs or undertake exploratory expeditions".

The club continues to encourage and sponsor mountaineering expeditions through its membership and is specifically focused on connecting with younger mountaineers.

In 2007, the Alpine Club established the Spirit of Mountaineering Commendation. This commendation is presented to those individuals that the Alpine Club considers to have "displayed unselfish devotion in rendering assistance to a fellow human being imperilled in the mountains" and, in so doing, "sacrificed his/her own objective and possibly jeopardised his/her own personal safety."

It also holds extensive book and photo libraries as well as an archive of historical artifacts which are regularly lent out to exhibitions.

== Publications ==
The Club maintains an online "Himalayan Index" of articles about Himalayan mountaineering activities recorded in journals, magazines and books in its library.

Its members' activities are recounted annually in the club's publication the Alpine Journal, the world's oldest mountaineering journal, and interim newsletters are produced during the year.

The club has also produced a suite of guidebooks that cover some of the more popular Alpine mountaineering regions.

== History ==
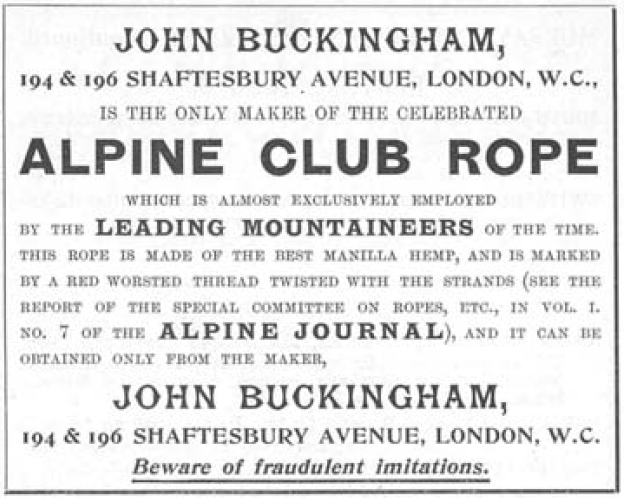
Advert in Whymper's Guides Advertiser in 1897.

The Alpine Club was founded on 22 December 1857 by a group of British mountaineers at Ashley's Hotel in London. The original founders were active mountaineers in the Alps and instrumental in the development of alpine mountaineering during the Golden Age of Alpinism (1854–1865). E. S. Kennedy was the first chairman of the Alpine Club but the naturalist, John Ball, was the first president. Kennedy, also the first vice-president, succeeded him as president of the club from 1860 to 1863. In 1863, the club moved its headquarters to the Metropole Hotel.

The Alpine Club is specifically known for having developed early mountaineering-specific gear including a new type of rope. The goal was to engineer a strong and light rope that could be carried easily. A committee of the club tested samples from suppliers and prepared a specification in the early 1900s. The official Alpine Club Rope was then made by John Buckingham of Bloomsbury. It was made from three strands of manila hemp, treated to be rot proof and marked with a red thread of worsted yarn. From the 19th century British mountaineers and members of the Alpine Club were instrumental in the popularisation of mountainteering in Norway among the international mountaineering community, with William Cecil Slingsby's influential book, Norway, the Northern Playground. The Alpine Club was the role model of the Norwegian Alpine Club, the third oldest of its kind worldwide.

The present Alpine Club members remain extremely active in the Alps and the Greater Ranges, as well as in mountain arts, literature and science.

For many years it had the characteristics of a London-based Gentlemen's club, including a certain imprecision in the qualification for membership (said to have been 'A reasonable number of respectable peaks'). Until 1974, the club was strictly for men only, but in 1975, within months of membership being opened to women, a merger with the Ladies' Alpine Club was agreed, and the Club thus gained about 150 new members. By the last quarter of the 20th century, the club had evolved into Britain's senior mountaineering club, with a clear qualification for membership, for both men and women, and an 'aspirant' grade for those working towards full membership. However, it still requires prospective members to be proposed and seconded by existing members.

The club's history has been documented by George Band in his book Summit: 150 Years of the Alpine Club, and its artists in The Artists of the Alpine Club by Peter Mallalieu.

== Presidents ==
- 1858–1860: John Ball
- 1861–1863: E. S. Kennedy
- 1864–1865: Alfred Wills
- 1866–1868: Leslie Stephen
- 1869–1871: William Mathews
- 1872–1874: William Longman
- 1875–1877: Thomas Woodbine Hinchliff
- 1878–1880: Charles Matthews
- 1881–1883: Thomas George Bonney
- 1884–1886: Florence Crauford Grove
- 1887–1889: Clinton Thomas Dent
- 1890–1892: Horace Walker
- 1893–1895: Douglas Freshfield
- 1896–1898: Charles Pilkington
- 1899–1901: Dr James Bryce (later Viscount Bryce)
- 1902–1904: Sir Martin Conway (later Lord Conway of Allington)
- 1905–1907: George Forrest Browne, Bishop of Bristol
- 1908–1910: Hermann Wooley
- 1911–1913: W. E. Davison
- 1914–1916: William Pickford
- 1917–1919: John Percy Farrar
- 1920–1922: J. Norman Collie
- 1923–1925: Charles Granville Bruce
- 1926–1928: Sir George Henry Morse
- 1929–1931: Claude Wilson
- 1932–1934: Sir John Withers
- 1935–1937: Edward Lisle Strutt
- 1938–1940: Sir Claud Schuster GCB (later Lord Schuster)
- 1941–1943: Geoffrey Winthrop Young
- 1944–1946: Leo Amery
- 1947–1949: Tom George Longstaff
- 1950–1952: Claude Aurelius Elliott
- 1953–1955: Edwin Savory Herbert (later Baron Tangley)
- 1956–1958: Sir John Hunt (later Lord Hunt)
- 1959–1961: George Finch
- 1962–1964: Howard Somervell
- 1965–1967: Eric Shipton
- 1968–1970: Charles Evans
- 1971–1973: A. D. M. Cox
- 1974–1976: John "Jack" Longland
- 1977–1979: Peter Lloyd
- 1980–1982: J. H. Emlyn Jones
- 1983–1985: R. R. E. Chorley (later Lord Chorley)
- 1986: A. K. Rawlinson (died in office)
- 1986: Lady Denise Evans
- 1987–1989: George Band
- 1990–1992: Lieutenant Colonel H. R. A. Streather 'Tony Streather'
- 1993–1995: Mike Westmacott
- 1996–1998: Sir Chris Bonington
- 1999–2001: Doug Scott
- 2002–2004: Alan Blackshaw
- 2005–2007: Stephen Venables
- 2008–2010: Paul Braithwaite
- 2011–2013: Mick Fowler
- 2014–2016: Lindsay Griffin
- 2017–2019: John Porter
- 2020–2022: Victor Saunders
- 2023: Simon Richardson

== Premises ==
The club's first premises were at 8 St Martin's Place, Trafalgar Square, where it rented rooms in 1858. In 1895 the club moved to 23 Savile Row, and in June 1907, the Scottish artist Sholto Johnstone Douglas held an exhibition of his portraits at the Club.

From 1937 to 1990 the club was based at 74, South Audley Street, in Mayfair, London. In 1936–1937, the surveying firm of Pilditch, Chadwick and Company had converted the ground floor of the building into suitable premises for the club. The club's library was at the back of the building, in what was once the picture gallery of Sir William Cuthbert Quilter. In 1990 the club sold its lease of 74, South Audley Street and briefly shared quarters with the Ski Club of Great Britain at 118, Eaton Square.

In 1991, the Alpine Club acquired the freehold of a five-storey Victorian warehouse at 55, Charlotte Road, on the edge of the City of London, and this building remains its current headquarters. The club's lecture room, bunk-house, library, and archives are all housed there.

== In fiction ==
In Dorothy L Sayers' 1923 novel Whose Body Sir Julian Freake is a member of the Alpine Club.
