= Grande Casse =

Mountain in France

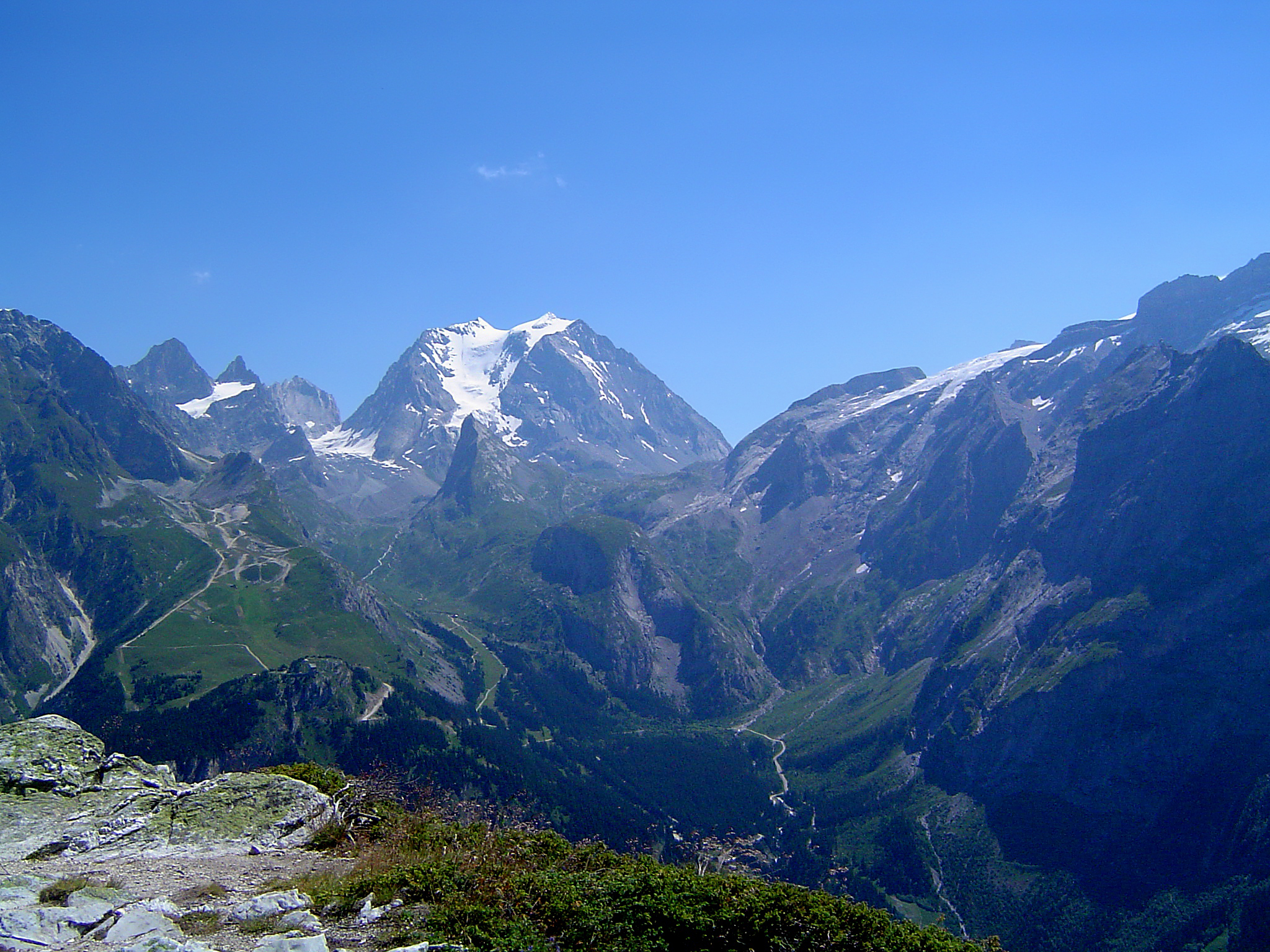
- South-west face of the Grande Casse

Highest point
- Elevation: 3,855 m (12,648 ft)
- Prominence: 1,305 m (4,281 ft)
- Parent peak: Gran Paradiso
- Listing: Alpine mountains above 3000 m
- Coordinates: 45°24′19″N 6°49′39″E

Geography
- Location within Alps
- Location: Savoie, France
- Parent range: Graian Alps

Climbing
- First ascent: 8 August 1860 by William Mathews with guides Michel Croz and E. Favre
- Easiest route: South-west flanks (les grands couloirs, PD+)

The Grande Casse (3,855 m) is the highest mountain of the Vanoise Massif in the Graian Alps in the Savoie department, France. It is located in the heart of Vanoise National Park, near the village of Pralognan-la-Vanoise, which is about 25 km south-east of the nearest town, Moûtiers. It has a steep 600 m high north face. The other sides of the mountain are more gentle, mostly consisting of broken rocks. A high ridge connects it to the nearby peak of Grande Motte. The ridge connecting the Grande Casse and the Grande Motte is the watershed between the Tarentaise Valley in the north and Maurienne Valley to the south.

== Climbing ==
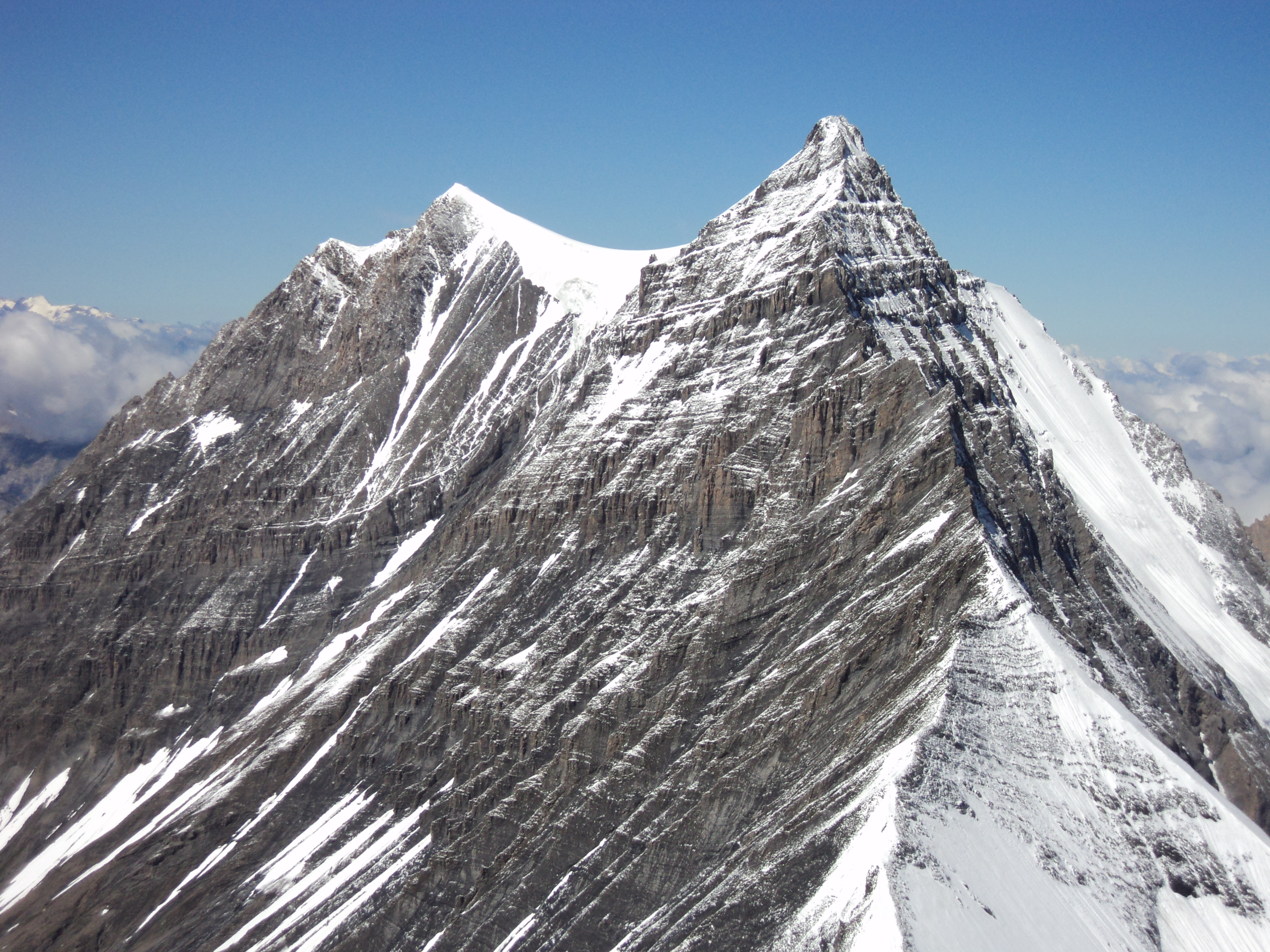
The summit of Grande Casse from Grande Motte

Despite its height it has a relatively easy normal route to the summit. Climbers usually start from the Les Grands Couloirs glacier and ascend the south-west side of the mountain. The north face is an extreme skiing destination.

The first ascent was made by William Mathews along with guides Michel Croz and E. Favre via the south-west face on 8 August 1860. The north face was climbed on 6 August 1933 by the Italians Aldo Bonacossa and L. Binaghi.

The Refuge Félix Faure (2,516 m), used for the normal route, is located at the Col de la Vanoise.

=== Main routes to the summit ===
This is an overview of the most common routes to the summit:

1. Normal route, "Les Grands couloirs" (PD+, 400 m with a gradient of around 40°), commonly climbed by skiers and climbers.
2. Petite face nord (AD, 600 m at 45-50°).
3. Couloir Messimy (AD, 45-50°).
4. North face, "Couloir des italiens" (D, 800 m at 55-60°).

== See also ==
- List of mountains of the Alps above 3000 m
