= William Mathews (mountaineer) =

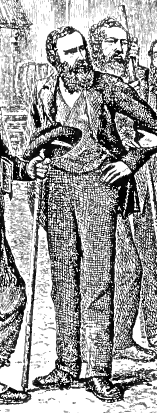
William Mathews portrayed by Edward Whymper in Zermatt, 1864 (from the original edition of Scrambles Amongst the Alps by Edward Whymper)

William Mathews (1828–1901) was an English mountaineer, botanist, land agent and surveyor, who first proposed the formation of the Alpine Club of London in 1857.

== Early life ==
He was the eldest of six sons of Jeremiah Mathews, a Worcestershire land agent, and his wife Mary Guest. Of his brothers, Charles Edward Mathews (1834–1905) and George Spencer Mathews (1836–1904) were also noted mountaineers. William was educated at St John's College, Cambridge.

== Founding of the Alpine Club ==
Mathews had corresponded with F. J. A. Hort about the idea of founding a national mountaineering club in February 1857 and took the idea up with E. S. Kennedy on an ascent of the Finsteraarhorn on 13 August 1857 (the fifth ascent of the mountain and the first British ascent). Ad hoc meetings at Mathews's house near Birmingham proceeded during November, and the meeting at which the Alpine Club was founded took place on 22 December 1857 at Ashley's Hotel in London, chaired by Kennedy.

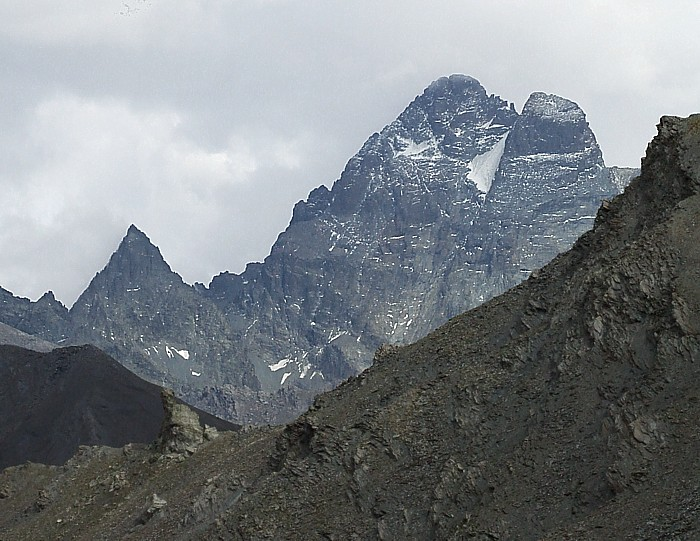
Monte Viso, first climbed by Mathews, Jacomb and Croz in 1861

== First ascents ==
- Grande Casse with guides Michel Croz and E. Favre on 8 August 1860
- Castor with F. W. Jacomb and Michel Croz on 23 August 1861
- Monte Viso with F. W. Jacomb and Michel Croz on 30 August 1861
- Grandes Rousses with Thomas George Bonney, and Michel Croz with his brother Jean-Baptiste Croz in 1863

== Publications ==
- 'Mechanical properties of ice, and their relation to glacier motion', by William Mathews, President of the Alpine Club, in Nature, 24 March 1870
- The Flora of Algeria: considered in relation to the physical history of the Mediterranean region and supposed submergence of the Sahara (London: Edward Stanford, 1880)
