= Aiguille Verte =

Mountain in the Mont Blanc massif in the French Alps

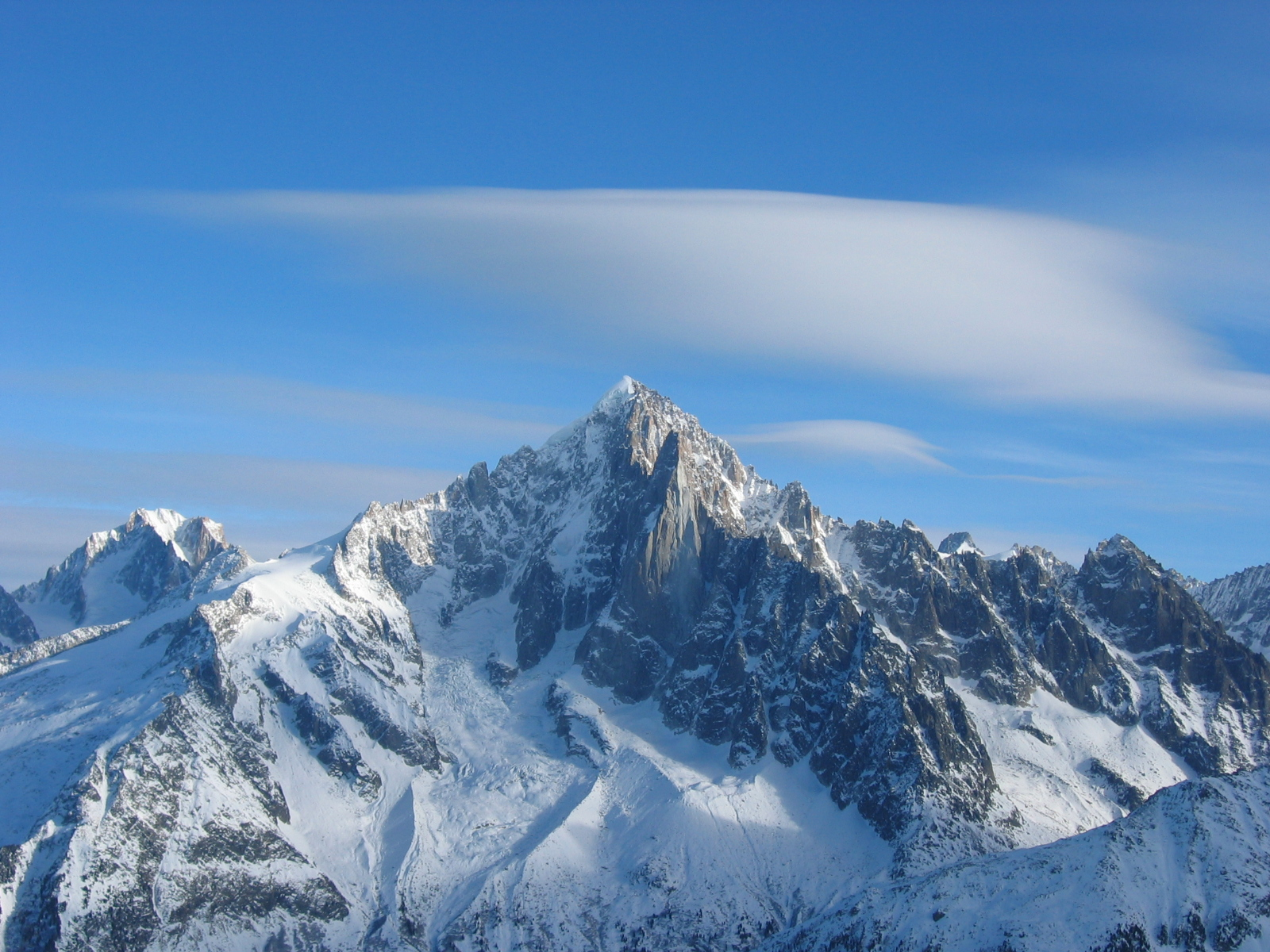
- The Aiguille Verte (centre), the Aiguille du Dru (center right), and the Aiguille d'Argentière (far left)

Highest point
- Elevation: 4,122 m (13,524 ft)
- Prominence: 689 m (2,260 ft)
- Coordinates: 45°56′05″N 6°58′12″E

Naming
- English translation: Green needle or high needle
- Language of name: French

Geography
- Location within France
- Location: Haute-Savoie, France
- Parent range: Mont Blanc Massif, Graian Alps

Climbing
- First ascent: 29 June 1865 by Edward Whymper, Christian Almer and Franz Biner

The Aiguille Verte (French pronunciation: [eɡɥij vɛʁt]; 4,122 m (13,524 ft)), is a mountain in the Mont Blanc massif in the French Alps. Aiguille Verte is French for "Green Needle", which is the meaning commonly attributed to the name. However, some scholars suggest that "verte", or the root "ver" or "var", may derive from a pre-Celtic term meaning "high place", which would give Aiguille Verte the alternative meaning of "High Needle".

== Ascents ==
Aiguille Verte was first climbed on 29 June 1865 by Edward Whymper, Christian Almer and Franz Biner, a fortnight before the fateful first ascent of the Matterhorn. Whymper was unable to climb with his usual guide, Michel Croz, who had to wait for a client in Chamonix. As a result, Whymper hired the services of Christian Almer, who had been with Alfred Wills on the Wetterhorn in 1854. Whymper describes the push for the summit:

At the top of the small gully we crossed over the intervening rocks into the large one [the eponymous Whymper couloir]. At last ice replaced snow, and we turned over to the rocks upon its left. Charming rocks they were; granitic in texture, gritty, holding the nails well. At 9.45 we parted from them, and completed the ascent by a little ridge of snow which descended in the direction of the Aiguille du Moine. At 10.15 we stood on the summit (13,541 feet [sic]), and devoured our bread and cheese with a good appetite.

The second ascent was by Charles Hudson, T. S. Kennedy and Michel Croz via the Moine ridge on 5 July 1865, only six days after the first ascend. The first woman to climb the Aiguille Verte was Lucy Walker in 1870. The first solo ascent of the Arête Sans Nom was accomplished by Nicolas Jaeger in 1972.

Famous French Alpinist Gaston Rébuffat later said:

Avant la Verte on est alpiniste, à la Verte on devient montagnard...

Which comes down to "It is on the Aiguille Verte that you become a real alpinist", describing how technically difficult the mountain is.

== Descents ==
Aiguille Verte is nearly as famous for its descents as it is for its ascents.

In 1989, Jean-Marc Boivin made the first descent of Aiguille Verte's Nant Blanc (North Face) on skis. Ten years later, Marco Siffredi made the second-ever descent of Nant Blanc, and the first descent on a snowboard. The North Face would not be descended via this route again until 2018 when Paul Bonhomme and Vivian Bruchez successfully descended on skis.

== Incidents ==
At times the Mont Blanc massif range has estimated 60 deaths per year. As part of this range, there have been a number of incidents where climbers or skiers have been killed or gone missing on Aiguille Verte.

1964 - A freak summer avalanche resulted in the deaths of 14 climbers, who were roped together.

1990 - Snowboarding pioneer Bruno Gouvy died when he lost control after parachuting from a helicopter.

2014 - On July 9, the body of Patrice Hyvert, a French climber who went missing on 1 March 1982, was found. In October, a skier was killed while skiing the Whymper Couloir when he fell several hundred metres to his death.

2018 - In January, a skier was killed while skiing the Whymper Couloir. In August, three members of an Italian climbing exhibition were killed when slipping on rocks.

2023 - In June, four were killed on Aiguille Verte. Two skiers were killed in separate incidents on Cordier Couloir, and two climbers fell to their death while on the Whymper Couloir.

2024 - In May, a skier fell 500 meters while descending the Whymper couloir.

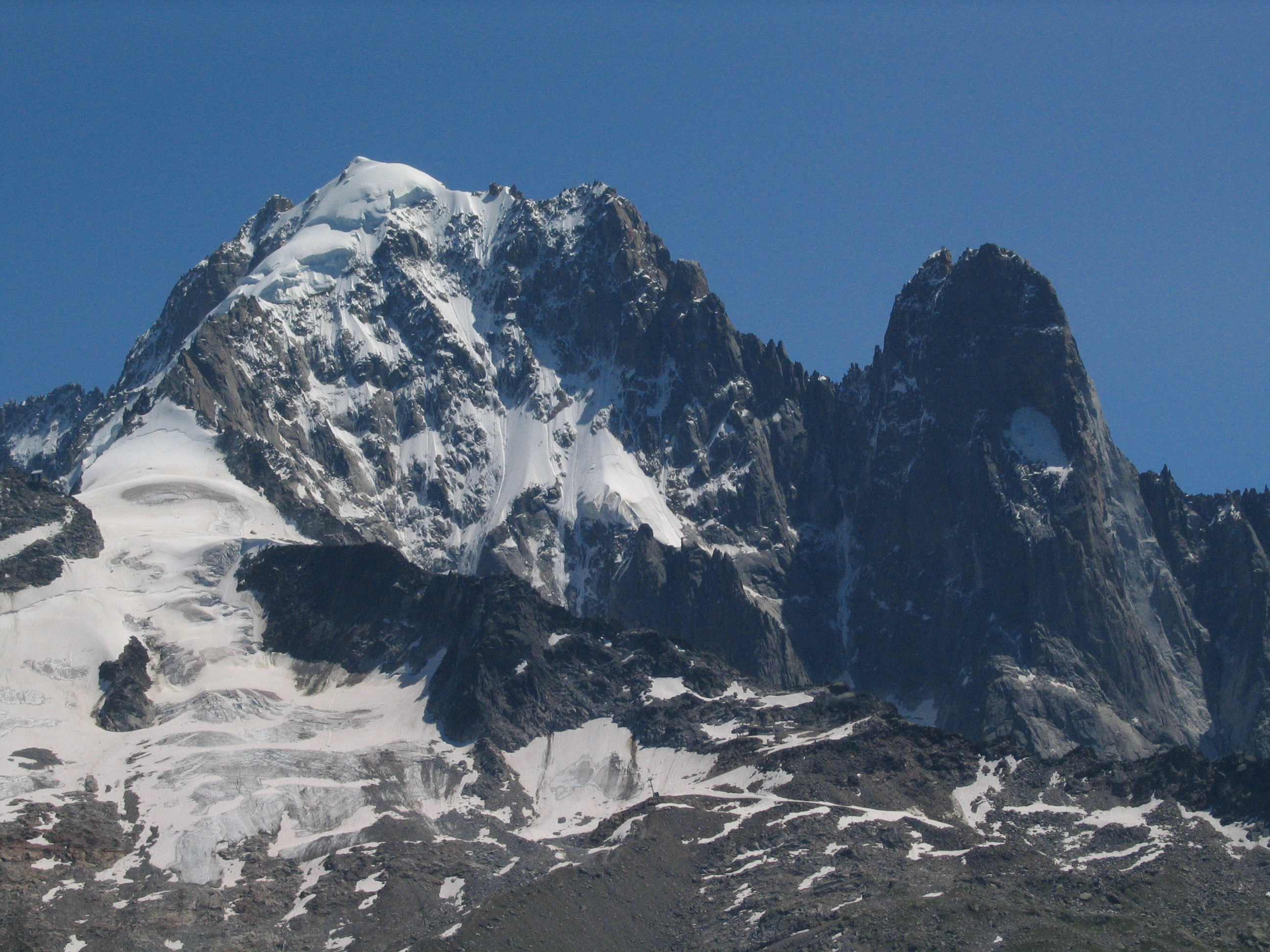
The Aiguille Verte from Montagne de la Flégère

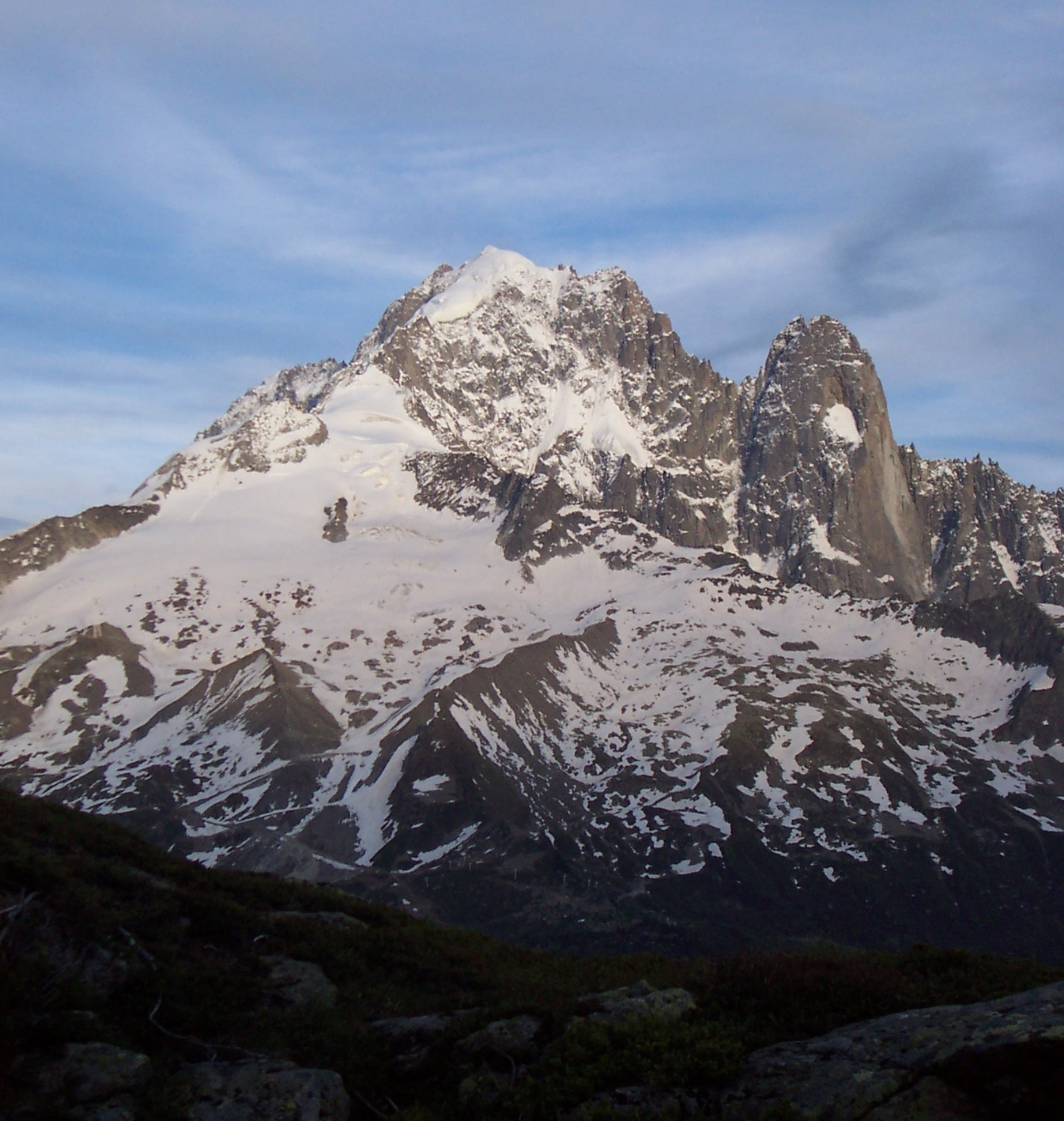
The Aiguille Verte (centre) and the Aiguille du Dru (right) from the Aiguilles Rouges

The northern side of the Aiguille Verte, with the Couturier and Cordier couloirs marked
