= Refuge Alfred Wills =

Coordinates: 46°0′16″N 6°47′29″E

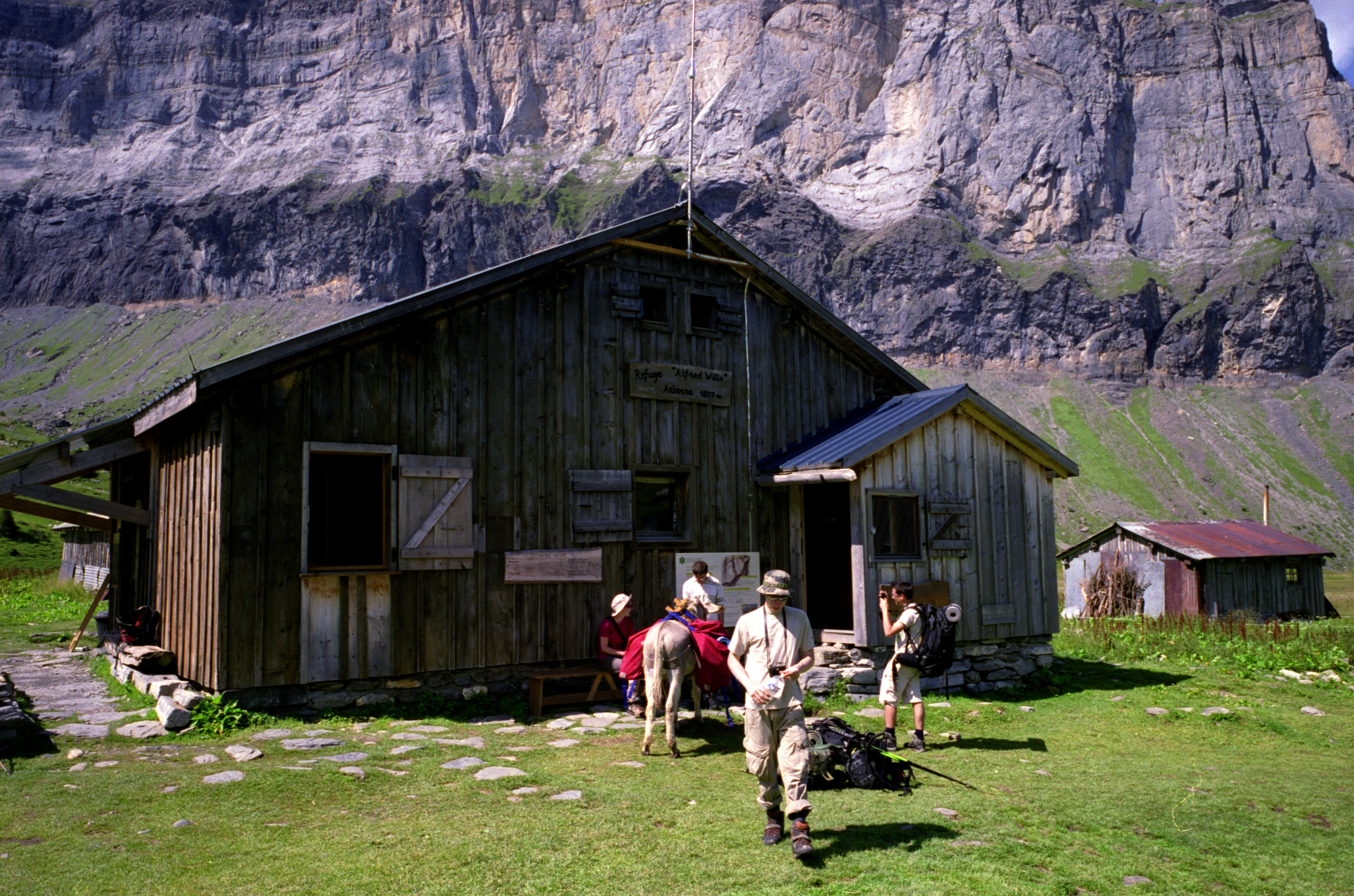
Refuge Alfred Wills

Refuge Alfred Wills is a mountain hut in the French Alps in Haute-Savoie.

The current shelter, bearing the same name, was built in 1981. At 1,808 metres (5,932 ft) in altitude, it is the site of the former pasture Anterne more commonly called "Cottages Anterne". It is surrounded by five private cottages.

The shelter is named after Alfred Wills, a British mountaineer and judge of the High Court of England and Wales, he was also a passionate climber. He tackled many Alpine glaciers, wrote several books about his exploits, and became the third president of the Alpine Club, serving from 1863 to 1865.

Arriving at Sixt-Fer-à-Cheval in 1850, Wills fell in love with the area and wanted to build a chalet. In 1859 construction began of what he named "Eagle's Nest", what the inhabitants later called "the Castle". During World War II, when France was under Nazi occupation, it was uninhabited and looted. After the war, repair costs proved to be too high, so the family put it up for sale.
