= Grand Cornier =

Mountain in Switzerland

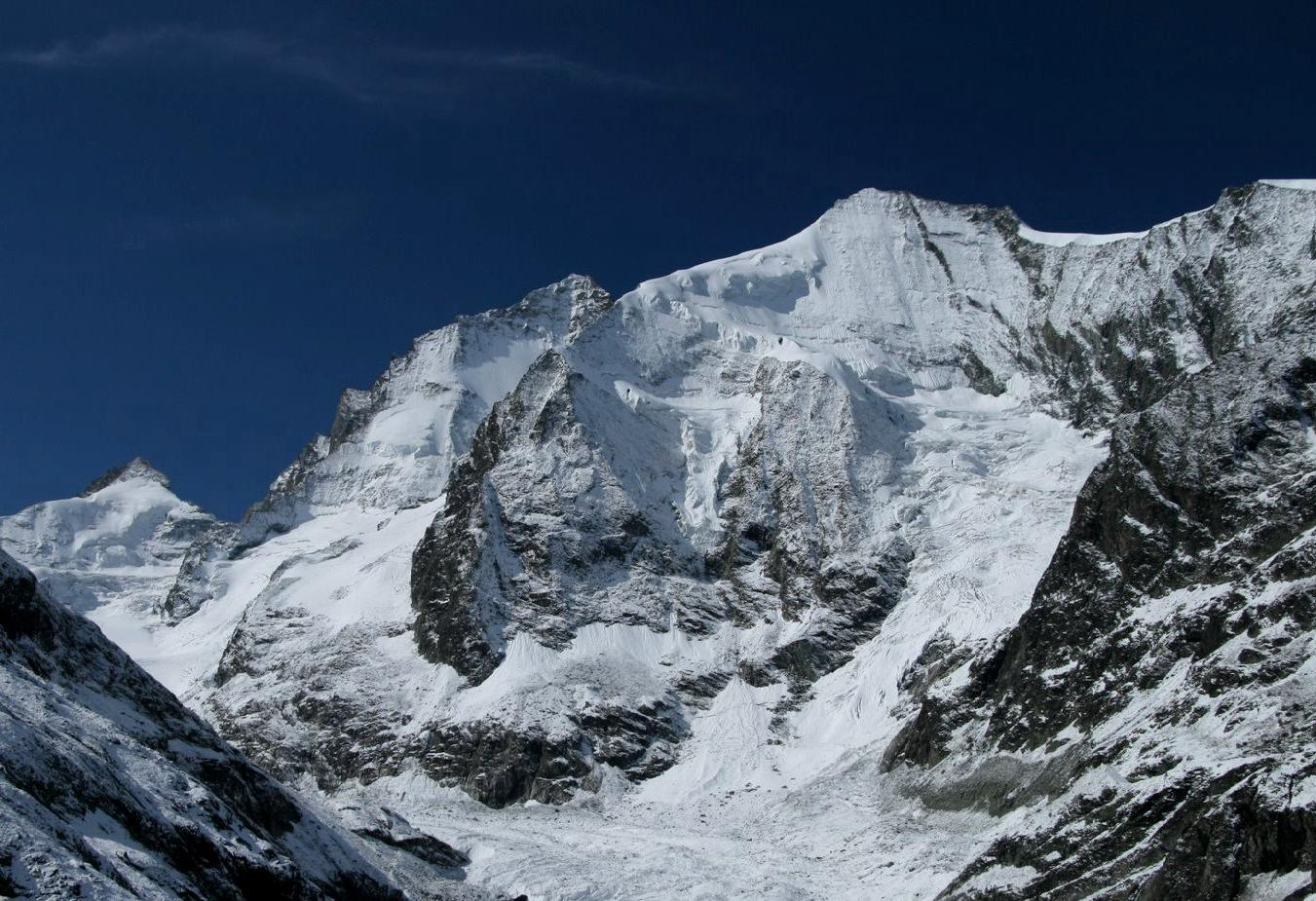
- North face of the Grand Cornier above the Zinal Glacier

Highest point
- Elevation: 3,962 m (12,999 ft)
- Prominence: 430 m (1,410 ft)
- Parent peak: Dent Blanche
- Listing: Alpine mountains above 3000 m
- Coordinates: 46°03′08″N 7°36′42″E

Geography
- Location within Switzerland
- Location: Valais, Switzerland
- Parent range: Pennine Alps

Climbing
- First ascent: 16 June 1865 by Edward Whymper, Christian Almer, Michel Croz and F. Biner
- Easiest route: PD+

The Grand Cornier is a 3,962 m (12,999 ft) mountain in the Pennine Alps in Switzerland. It lies 2 km (1.2 mi) north from the Dent Blanche.

The first ascent of the mountain was made via the east ridge by Edward Whymper, Christian Almer, Michel Croz and F. Biner on 16 June 1865.

The Mountet hut (2,886 m (9,469 ft)) and Moiry hut (2,825 m (9,268 ft)) are used for the normal ascent routes.

== See also ==
- List of mountains of the Alps above 3000 m
- List of mountains of Switzerland
