= Mont Blanc du Tacul =

Mountain in the Mont Blanc massif

- Aerial view of Mont Blanc du Tacul (centre) with Mont Maudit at the left border of the image

Highest point
- Elevation: 4,248 m (13,937 ft)
- Prominence: 219 m ↓ Col Maudit
- Isolation: 1.38 km → Mont Maudit
- Coordinates: 45°51′23″N 06°53′16″E

Geography
- Location within France
- Location: Haute-Savoie, France
- Parent range: Graian Alps

Geology
- Mountain type: Granite

Climbing
- First ascent: Charles Hudson, Edward John Stevenson, Christopher and James Grenville Smith, E. S. Kennedy, Charles Ainslie and G. C. Joad on 8 August 1855
- Easiest route: North-west face (PD)

Mont Blanc du Tacul (4,248 m) is a mountain in the Mont Blanc massif of the French Alps situated midway between the Aiguille du Midi and Mont Blanc.

The official first ascent of Mont Blanc du Tacul was by a guideless party comprising Charles Hudson, Edward John Stevenson, Christopher and James Grenville Smith, E. S. Kennedy, Charles Ainslie and G. C. Joad on 8 August 1855. However, Courmayeur guides may have already ascended the peak during their attempts in 1854 and 1855 to force a way up Mont Blanc from the Italian side.

== Gallery ==
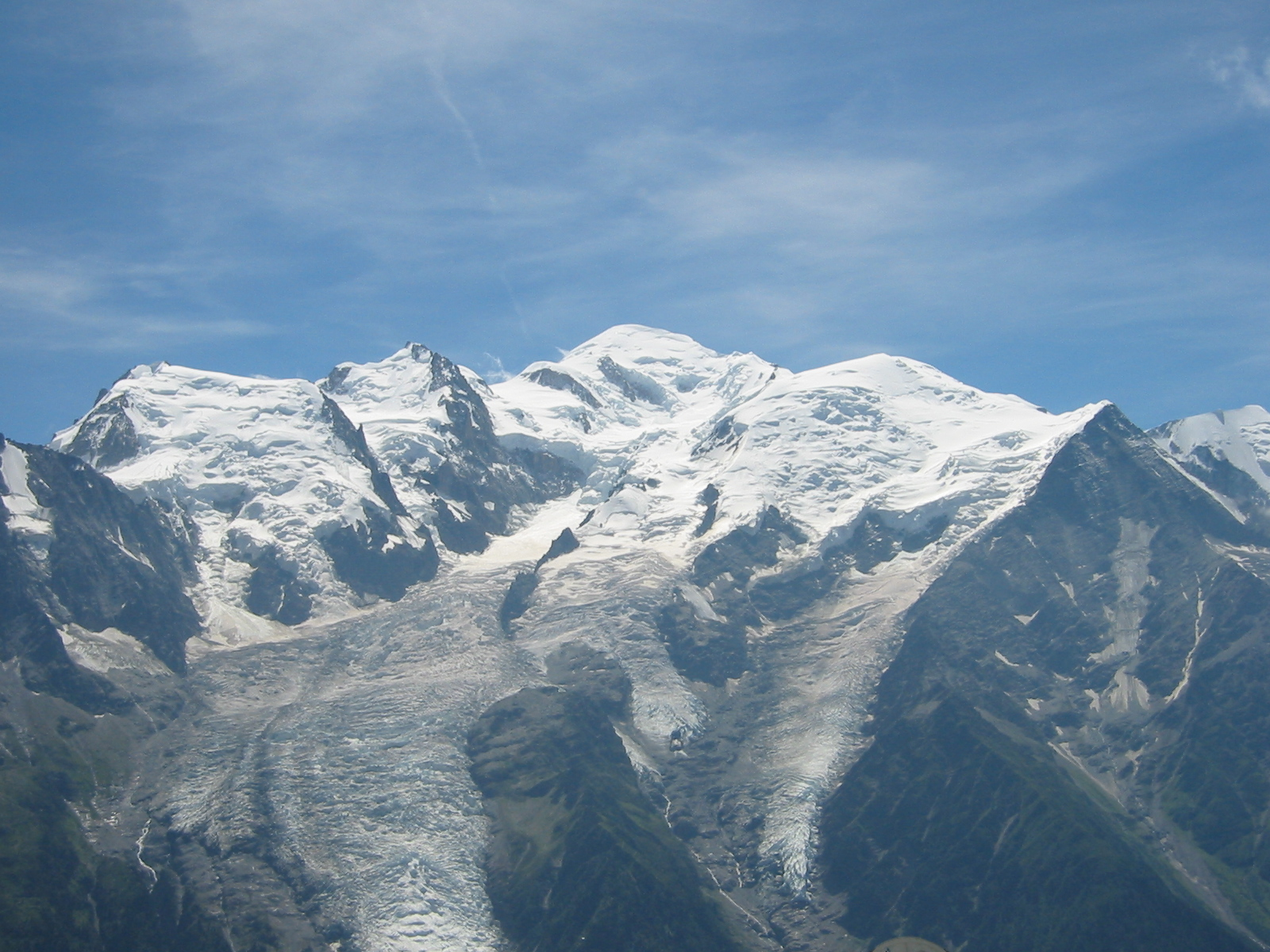
Mont Blanc du Tacul (far left), Mont Maudit (left) and Mont Blanc (centre)

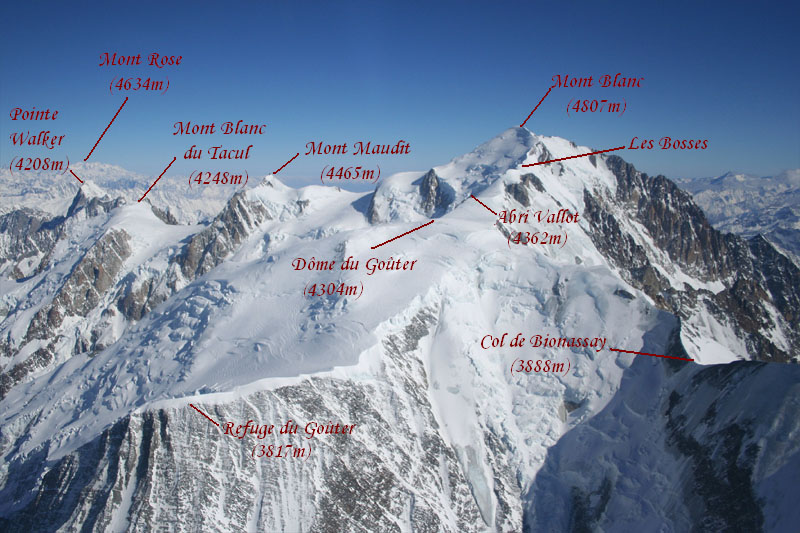
Aerial photo of Mont Blanc and other summits

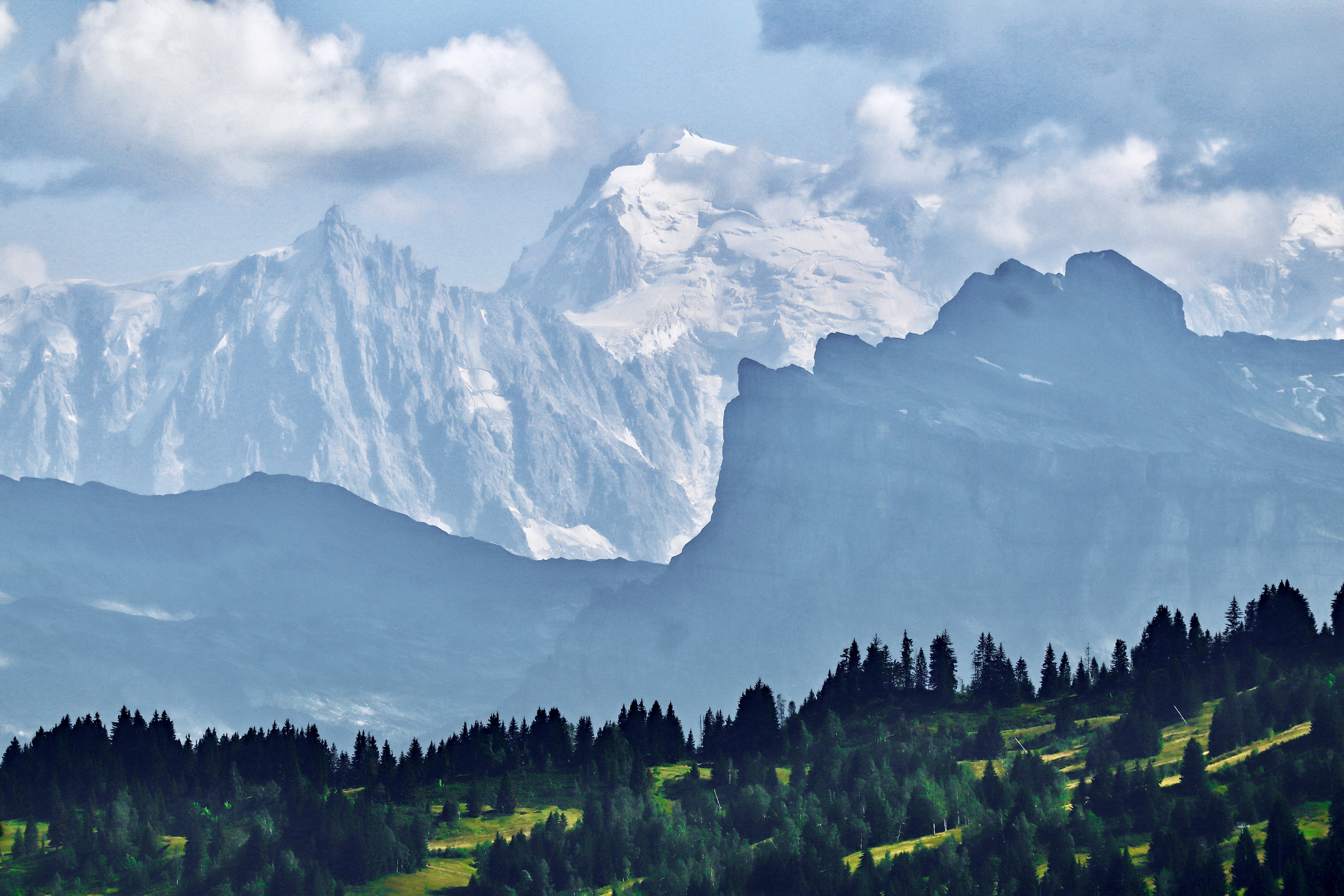
Mont Blanc du Tacul from Mont Chéry

== See also ==
- List of 4000 metre peaks of the Alps
