= Grande Motte =

Mountain of Savoie, France

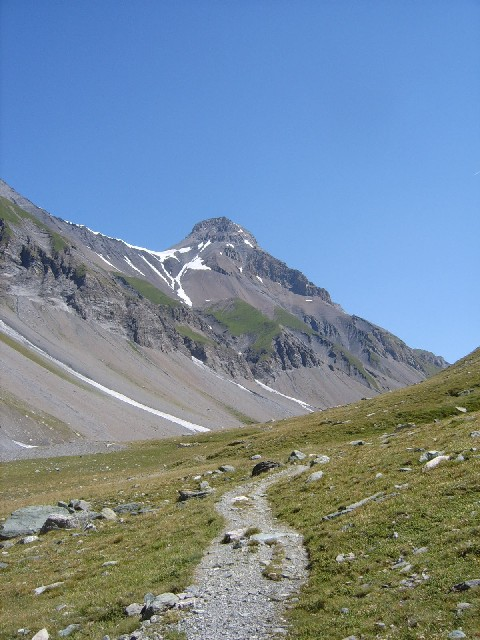

Highest point
- Elevation: 3,653 m (11,985 ft)
- Listing: Alpine mountains above 3000 m
- Coordinates: 45°24′40″N 06°52′13″E

Geography
- Location within France
- Location: Savoie, France
- Parent range: Vanoise Massif

Grande Motte is a mountain of Savoie, France. It lies in the Massif de la Vanoise range. It has an elevation of 3,653 metres above sea level.

One side of it is in the Tignes ski area. There is a cable car up to the top station at 3,456 metres (11,339 ft) above sea level.
