= Charles Hudson (climber) =

English chaplain and mountain climber (1828–1865)

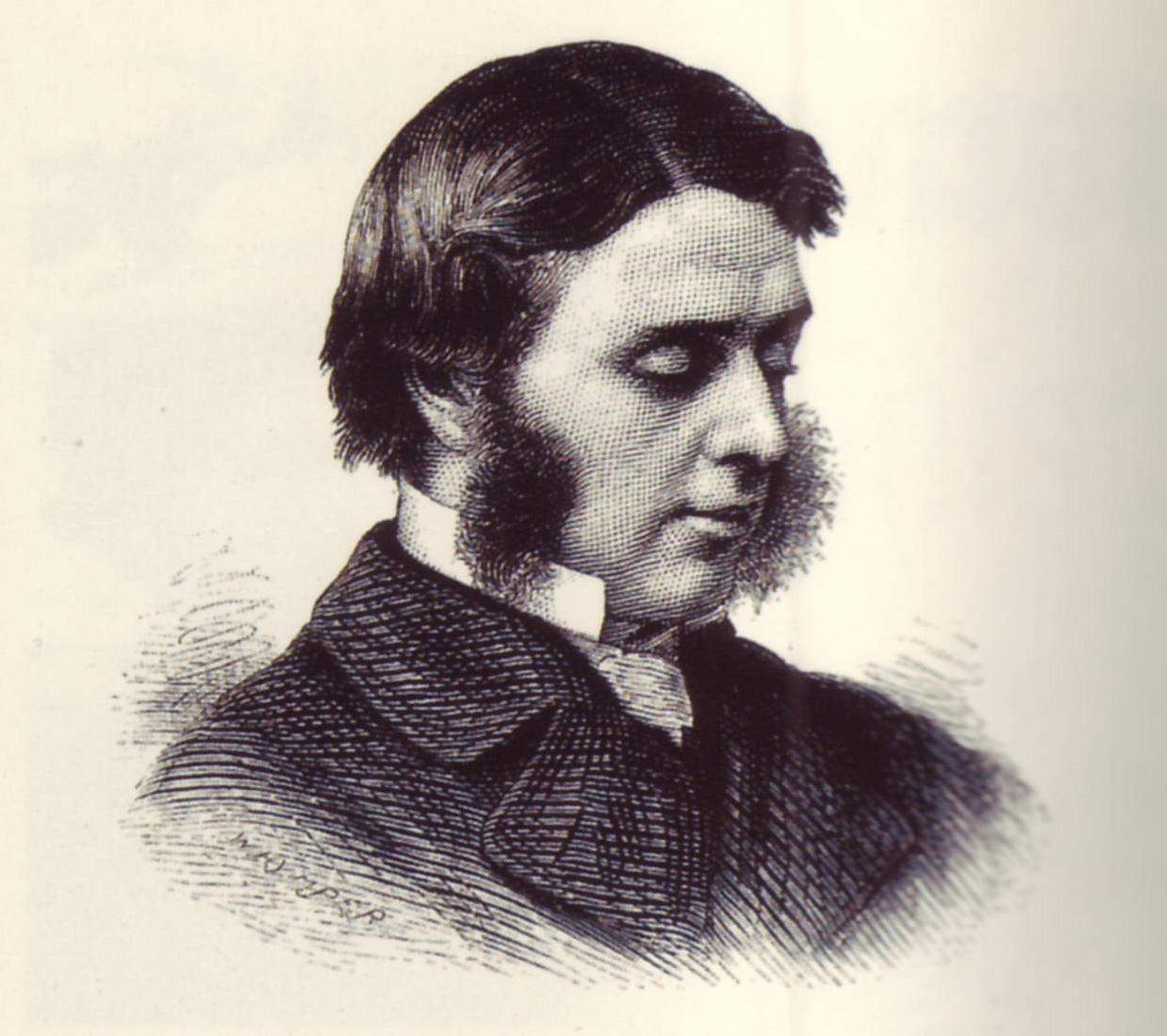
Charles Hudson

Charles Hudson (4 October 1828 – 14 July 1865) was an Anglican chaplain and mountain climber from Skillington, Lincolnshire, England.

== Biography ==
Educated at St Peter's School, York, Hudson was one of the most important climbers of the golden age of alpinism. An immensely strong walker, he claimed amongst his climbs the first ascent of Monte Rosa in 1855, the first official ascent of Mont Blanc du Tacul in 1855, the first completed passage of the Mönchjoch in 1858, the first ascent of Mont Blanc by the Goûter route (incomplete) in 1859 with E. S. Kennedy and party, and the second ascent of the Aiguille Verte (the first by the Moine ridge) in 1865 (with T. S. Kennedy and Michel Croz). He is also considered a pioneer of English guideless climbing in the western Alps, having made the first guideless ascent of Mont Blanc in 1855 and a guideless ascent of the Breithorn.

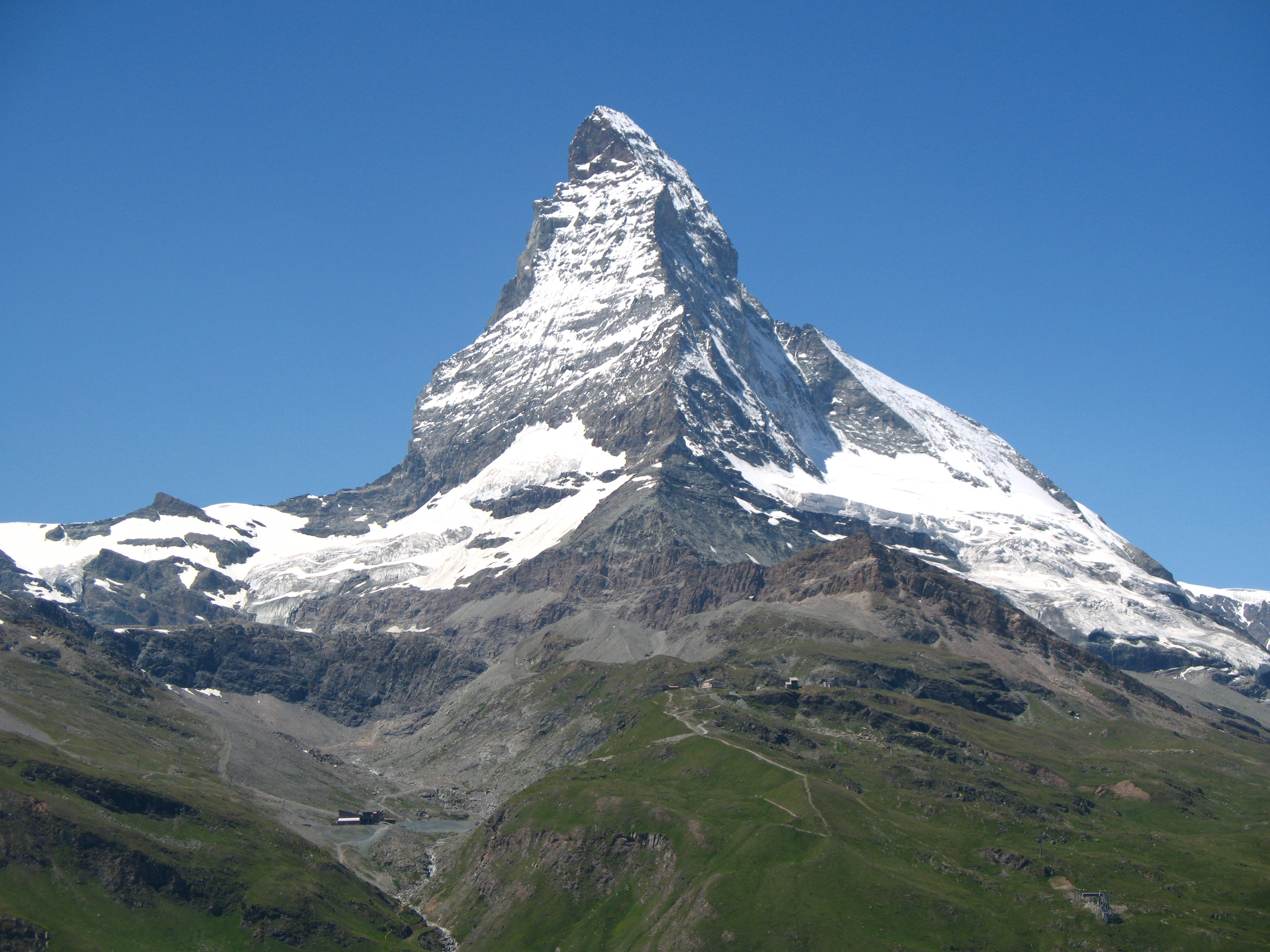
The Matterhorn. The fatal accident occurred on the sunny snow slopes at the top right of the mountain

== Matterhorn accident ==
During the first ascent of the Matterhorn on 14 July 1865 Hudson was killed in a notorious accident during the descent. Edward Whymper was planning to climb the mountain with Lord Francis Douglas, when he heard that Hudson (together with Michel Croz) had the same objective. Whymper wrote:

Lord Francis Douglas and I dined at the Monte Rosa hotel, and had just finished when Mr. Hudson and a friend entered the salle à manger. They had returned from inspecting the mountain and some idlers in the room demanded their intentions. We heard a confirmation of Croz's statement, and learned that Mr. Hudson intended to set off on the morrow at the same hour as ourselves. We left the room to consult, and agreed that it was undesirable for two independent parties to be on the same mountain at the same time with the same object. Mr Hudson was therefore invited to join us, and he accepted our proposal. Before admitting his friend—Mr. Hadow—I took the precaution of asking what he had done in the Alps, and, as well as I remember, Mr. Hudson's reply was, "Mr. Hadow has done Mont Blanc in less time than most men."

— Whymper, Scrambles amongst the Alps

The accident occurred because Hadow slipped on the descent not far from the summit, pulling Croz, Hudson and Douglas down the north face of the mountain; the rope between these four and the other three members of the party (Whymper and the two Zermatt guides named Peter Taugwalder, father and son), snapped, saving them from the same fate. Some have blamed Hudson for insisting on the presence of the inexperienced Hadow in the party, and for not checking the quality of the rope or the boots Hadow was wearing.

Hudson's body was retrieved from the Matterhorn glacier and was buried in the Zermatt churchyard.
