= Aiguille d'Argentière =

Mountain in the Mont Blanc massif

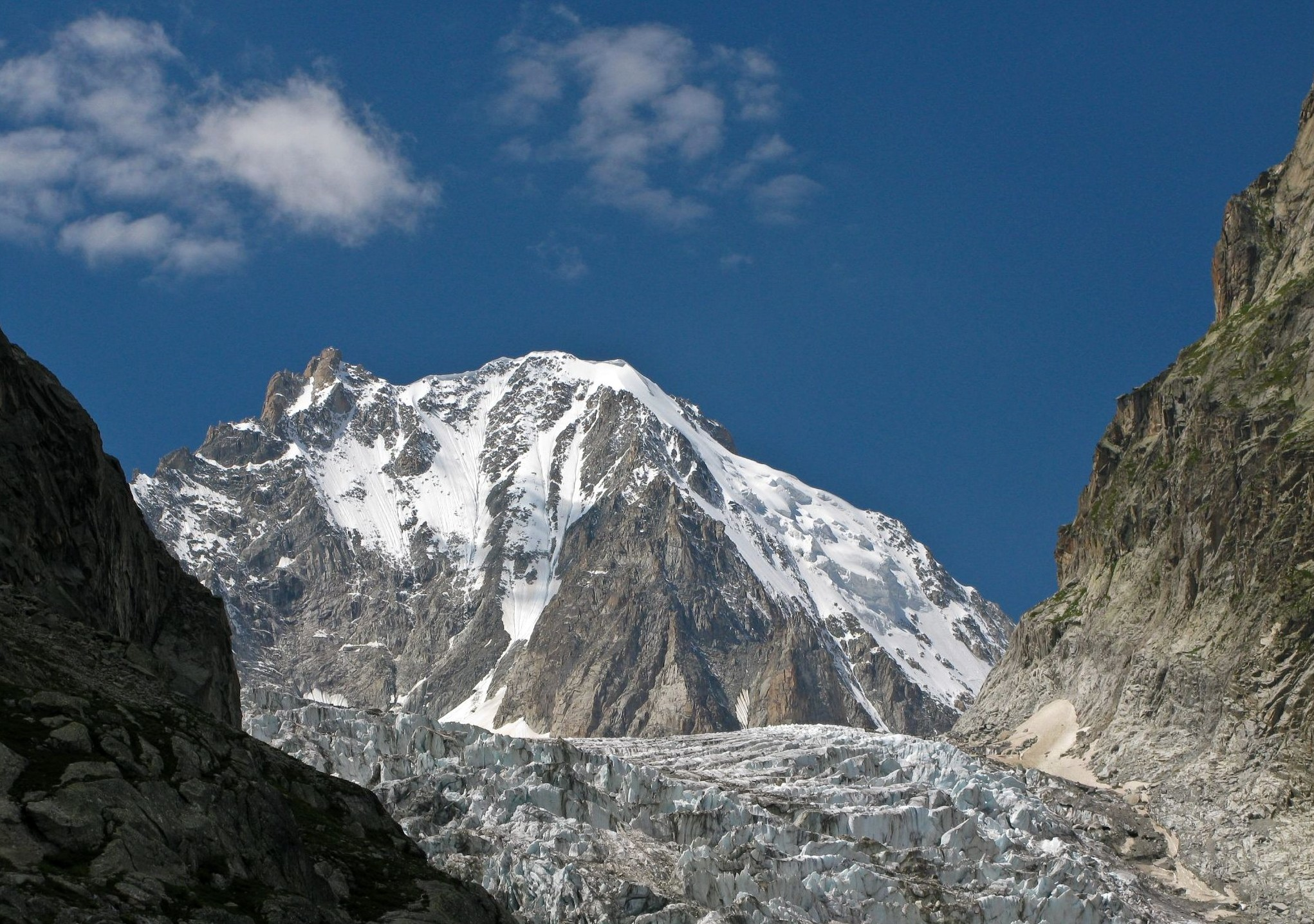
- The eastern side of the Aiguille d'Argentière: main-top (center) and the rocky summit Flèche Rousse (left)

Highest point
- Elevation: 3,898 m (12,789 ft)
- Prominence: 470 m (1,540 ft)
- Parent peak: Grandes Jorasses
- Listing: Alpine mountains above 3000 m
- Coordinates: 45°57′35″N 7°01′13″E

Geography
- Location within Alps
- Location: Haute-Savoie, France / Valais, Switzerland
- Parent range: Graian Alps

Geology
- Mountain type: Granite

Climbing
- First ascent: 15 July 1864 by Edward Whymper and A. Reilly with guides Michel Croz, M. Payot, H. Charlet
- Easiest route: West flank and north-west ridge (PD)

The Aiguille d'Argentière (3,898 metres (12,789 ft)) is a mountain in the Mont Blanc massif on the border between France and Switzerland. The second highest summit of the Aiguille d'Argentière is the prominent rock-tower Flèche Rousse (3,878 metres (12,723 ft)) southeast of the main-summit.

The first ascent of the mountain was by a British party comprising Edward Whymper and A. Reilly with guides Michel Croz, M. Payot, H. Charlet on 15 July 1864. The route they took was via the west flank and the north-west ridge.

== See also ==
- Argentière
- List of mountains of the Alps above 3000 m
- List of mountains of Switzerland

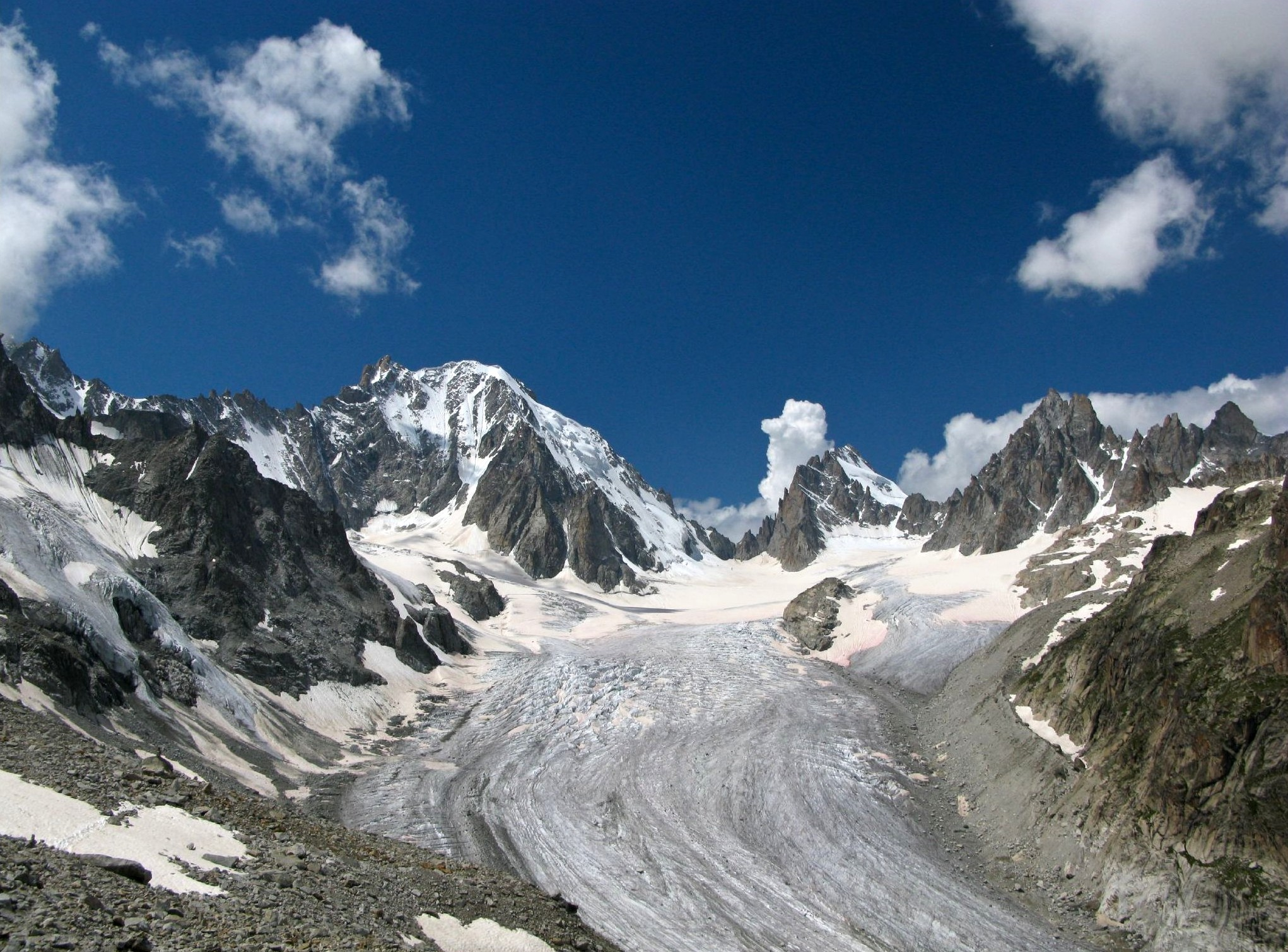
The Aiguille d'Argentière above the Saleina Glacier

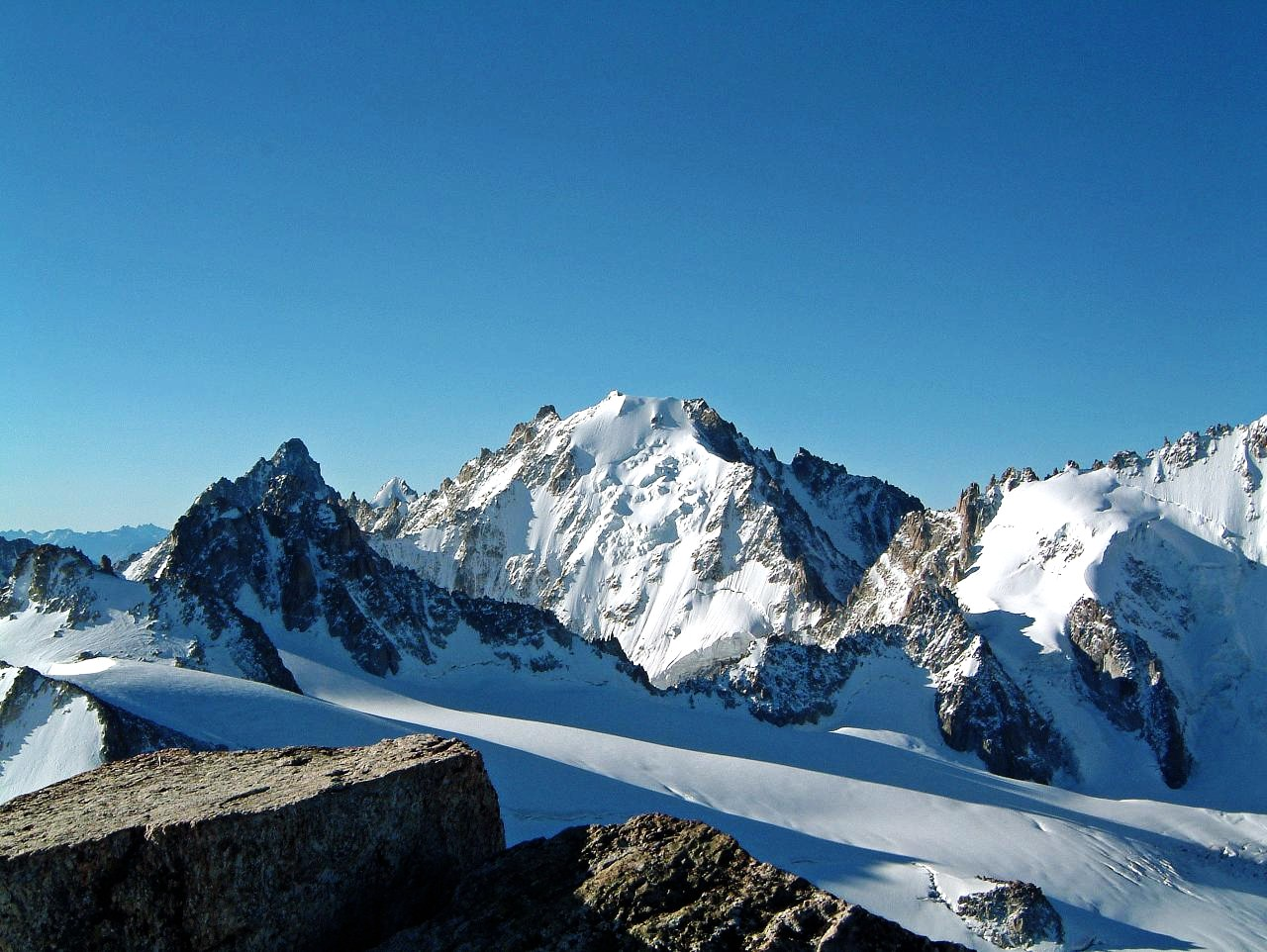
The Aiguille d'Argentière from the north
