= Alpine Journal =

Oldest mountaineering journal

- Categories: Climbing, Mountaineering
- Frequency: Annually
- Publisher: The Alpine Club
- First issue: 2 March 1863
- Country: United Kingdom
- Website: www.alpinejournal.org.uk
- ISSN: 0065-6569

The Alpine Journal (AJ) is an annual publication by the Alpine Club of London. It is the oldest mountaineering journal in the world.

== History ==
The journal was first published on 2 March 1863 by the publishing house of Longman in London, with Hereford Brooke George as its first editor. It was a replacement for Peaks, Passes, and Glaciers, which had been issued in two series: in 1858 (with John Ball as editor), and 1862 (in two volumes, with Edward Shirley Kennedy as editor).

The journal covers all aspects of mountains and mountaineering, including expeditions, adventure, art, literature, geography, history, geology, medicine, ethics and the mountain environment, and the history of mountain exploration, from early ascents in the Alps, exploration of the Himalaya and the succession of attempts on Mount Everest, to present-day exploits.

== Online access ==
Journal volumes since 1926 (bar the current issue) are freely available online. Digital scans of earlier volumes of the Alpine Journal from 1863 to 1929 have been made by academic libraries and are available online.

== Notable editors ==
The following people have edited the journal:

- Leslie Stephen (1868–1872)
- Douglas Freshfield (1872–1880)
- Arthur John Butler (1890–1893)
- George Yeld (1896–1926)
- John Percy Farrar (1920–1926, co-editor)
- Edward Lisle Strutt (1927–1937)
- T. Graham Brown (1949–1953)
- Johanna Merz (1992–1998)
- Ed Douglas (1999–2023)
