= Thomas George Bonney =

English geologist

Thomas George Bonney FRS
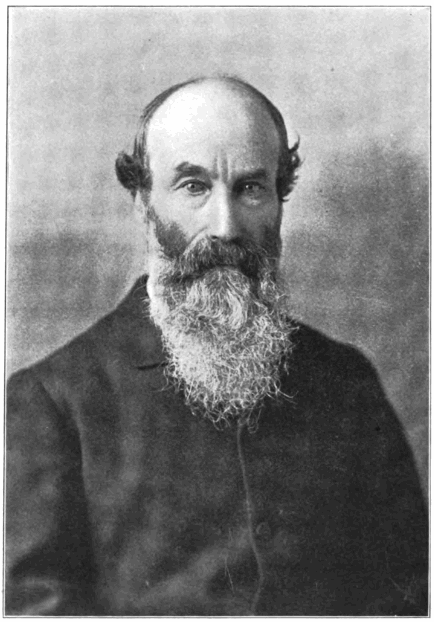
- Bonney in 1909
- Born: 27 July 1833; Rugeley, Staffordshire, England
- Died: 10 December 1923 (aged 90); Cambridge, Cambridgeshire, England
- Education: St John's College, Cambridge
- Scientific career
- Workplaces: Westminster School; St John's College, Cambridge; University College London
- Notable students: John Edward Marr

Signature
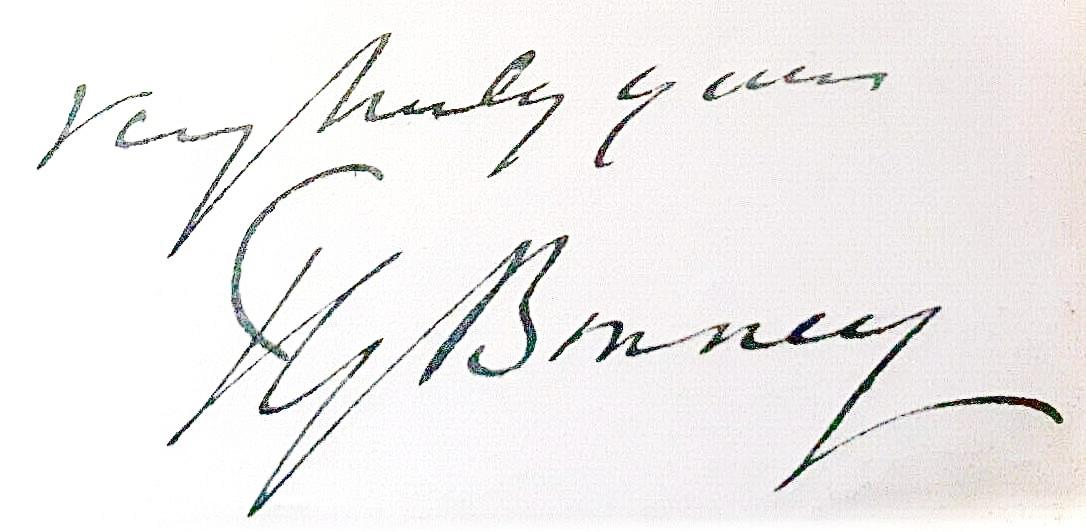

Thomas George Bonney (27 July 1833 – 10 December 1923) was an English geologist, president of the Geological Society of London.

== Career ==
Bonney was born in Rugeley, Staffordshire, England, the eldest son of the Reverend Thomas Bonney, headmaster of Rugeley Grammar School. His uncle was the Australian explorer Charles Bonney, and one of his brothers, Frederic Bonney, is remembered for his photography and ethnology in Australia. Thomas was educated at Uppingham School and St John's College, Cambridge, where he graduated as 12th wrangler in 1856, and was ordained in the following year.

From 1856 to 1861 he was mathematical master at Westminster School, and he pursued geology only as a recreational activity, mainly in Alpine regions. In 1868 he was appointed tutor at St John's College, Cambridge and lecturer in geology. His attention was specially directed to the study of the igneous and metamorphic rocks in Alpine regions and in various parts of England (e.g.: the Lizard in Cornwall, at Salcombe and in the Charnwood Forest), Wales and the Scottish Highlands.

From 1877 to 1901 he was professor of geology in University College London. He became secretary and later president of the Geological Society of London (1884–1886), and also a fellow; secretary of the British Association (1881–1885) and its president for the year 1910–1911; president of the Mineralogical Society. He was president of the Alpine Club, 1881–1883. In 1887, Bonney was appointed honorary canon of Manchester.

He was elected a Fellow of the Royal Society on 6 June 1878. He died in Cambridge on 10 December 1923. Lake Bonney in Antarctica is named after him.

== Publications ==
His purely scientific works are:

- Cambridgeshire Geology (1875)
- The Story of our Planet (1893)
- Charles Lyell and Modern Geology (1895)
- Ice Work, Past and Present (1896)
- Volcanoes (1899).
- Bonney, T. G. The structure of the earth. London: T. C. & E. C. Jack. OCLC 18582859.

In addition to many papers published in the Quarterly Journal of the Geological Society and Geological Magazine, he wrote several popular works on Alpine Regions, on English and Welsh scenery, as well as on theological subjects.

- Memories of a long life. Cambridge: Metcalfe. 1921. OCLC 4338105.
- Bonney, T. G. (1919). Annals of the Philosophical Club of the Royal Society. London: The MacMillan & Co. Ltd. OCLC 1829655.

== Collections ==
University College London Special Collections holds correspondence from Bonney to W. J. Sollas written between 1885 - 1920.

== See also ==
- Geology of the United Kingdom
- Mount Bonney
