= Alfred Wills =

Judge of the High Court of England and Wales and a mountaineer

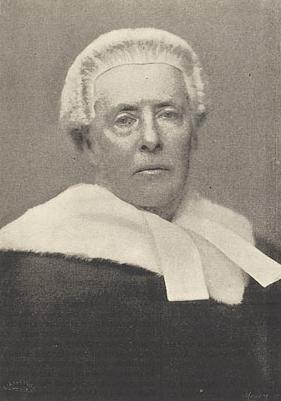
Sir Alfred Wills.

Sir Alfred Wills (11 December 1828 – 9 August 1912) was a judge of the High Court of England and Wales and a well-known mountaineer. He was the third President of the Alpine Club, from 1863 to 1865.

== Early life ==
Wills was the second son of William Wills, JP, of Edgbaston, Birmingham, and of his wife Sarah Wills, a daughter of Jeremiah Ridout. He was educated at King Edward's School, Birmingham and at University College London, where he held exhibitions and scholarships in Mathematics, Classics and Law, graduating BA in 1849 and LLB in 1851.

== Legal career ==
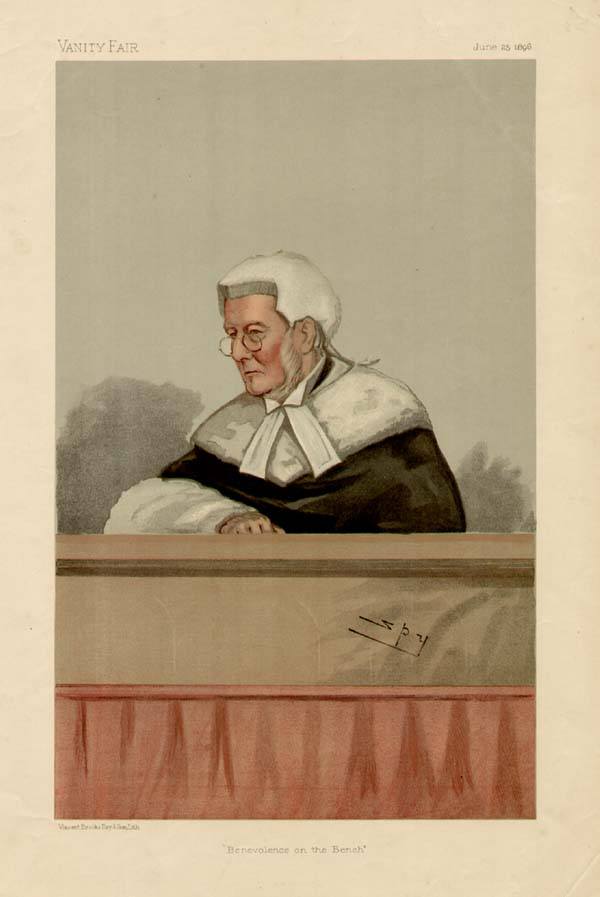
Wills caricatured by Spy for Vanity Fair, 1896

Wills was called to the bar by the Middle Temple in 1851 and was appointed Queen's Counsel in 1872. He was first Recorder of Sheffield, 1881–84; a Judge of the Queen's and King's Bench Division of the High Court of Justice, 1884–1905, President of the Railway and Canal Commission, 1888–1893, and Treasurer of the Middle Temple, 1892–1893.

During his career as a judge, his most notable act was presiding over the trial in which Oscar Wilde was convicted for "committing acts of gross indecency with other male persons". Willis sentenced Wilde to two years' hard labour. The judge described the sentence, the maximum allowed, as "totally inadequate for a case such as this," and that the case was "the worst case I have ever tried". Wilde's response of "And I? May I say nothing, my Lord?" was drowned out in cries of "Shame" in the courtroom.

With his father William Wills, he co-authored An essay on the principles of circumstantial evidence : illustrated by numerous cases (1905), still a standard text often cited.

== Mountaineer ==
The ascent of the Wetterhorn above Grindelwald in the Bernes Alps by Wills and his party in 1854, which Wills mistakenly believed was the first (actually summited a decade earlier by local guides Melchior Bannholzer and Hans Jaun on 31 August 1844) is considered the beginning of the so-called golden age of alpinism. His account of the expedition helped make climbing mountains as sport fashionable. A fuller record of his alpine activities is given in Mumm's Register.

He was the third President of the Alpine Club from 1863 to 1865.

A mountain hut near Chamonix bears his name: the Refuge Alfred Wills.

== Family ==
In 1854 Wills married Lucy, daughter of George Martineau. She died in 1860, and in 1861 he married Bertha, daughter of Thomas Lombe Taylor, of Starston, Norfolk. His second wife died in 1906. He had two children from his marriage to Lucy and a further five children from his second marriage.

His eldest daughter, Edith (1855-1936), was the mother of Edward F. Norton who took part in the British 1922 Everest and 1924 Everest expeditions, reaching high elevations both years.

== Honours ==
- Knighted, 1884
- Privy Councillor, 1905

== Publications ==
- Wanderings among the High Alps (1856)
- The Eagle's Nest in the Valley of Sixt (1860)
- Wills on Circumstantial Evidence (ed.)
- Rendu's Théorie des Glaciers de la Savioe (translation)
