= List of first ascents of mountain summits =

For mountain peaks only

The following is a list of notable first ascents of the summits of major mountains around the world, in chronological order.

The list does not include the first ascent of new routes to previously climbed mountain summits. For example, this list contains the first ascent of the summit of the Eiger in 1858, but not the more famous first ascent of the north face of the Eiger in 1938.

Date	Peak	Height (m)	Range	Country	Climbers	Nationality	Ref
2000 BC*	Mount Pulag	2926	Cordillera Central (Luzon)	(Philippines)	Ibaloi tribes		
569*	Matajur	1642	Prealps	(Slovenia) (Italy)	Alboin and troops		
663	Mount Fuji	3776		(Japan)	En no Ozunu		
905*	Mount Damavand	5610	Alborz	(Iran)	Abu Dolaf Kazraji		
1275	Canigou	2785	Pyrenees	(France)	Peter III of Aragon		
1348*	Benediktenwand	1801	Prealps	(Germany)	A Benedictine monk	(Holy Roman Empire)	
1 Sep 1358	Rocciamelone	3538	Alps	(Italy)	Bonifacius Rotarius of Asti		
1387*	Pilatus	2128	Alps	(Switzerland)	Six clerics	(Old Swiss Confederacy)	
27 Jun 1492	Mont Aiguille	2085	Prealps	(France)	Antoine de Ville and 8 to 10 more people.	(France)	
bef. 1500	Llullaillaco	6739	Andes	(Argentina) (Chile)	Local Incan people		
1503*	Table Mountain	1086		(South Africa)	António de Saldanha	(Portugal)	
1519*	Popocatépetl	5426	Sierra Nevada (Mex)	(Mexico)	Diego de Ordaz and two comrades	(Spain)	
1536*	Stockhorn	2190	Prealps	(Switzerland)	Johann Müller and Peter Kunz from Bern and company	(Old Swiss Confederacy)	
1552	Pic du Midi d'Ossau	2884	Pyrenees	(France)	expedition led by fr:François de Foix-Candale	(France)	
1559	Calanda	2805	Alps	(Switzerland)	J. Schmid, Z. Beeli, J. Pontisella, and others	(Old Swiss Confederacy)	
19 Aug 1573	Corno Grande	2912	Apennines	(Italy)	Francesco Di Domenico, guiding Francesco De Marchi, Cesare Schiafinato, Diomede dell'Aquila, and the porters Simone and Giovampietro Di Giulio	(Papal States)	
1579	Serles	2717	Alps	(Austria)	Hans Georg Ernstinger	(Austria)	
29 Jul 1582	Pichincha	4784	Andes	(Ecuador)	Alonso de Aguilar, Juan de Galarza, Juan de Londoño, José Toribio de Ortiguera, Juan Sánchez, and Francisco de Uncibay	(Spain)	
1615	Kežmarský štít	2558	Carpathians	(Slovakia)	David Frölich	(Habsburg monarchy)	
1642	Mount Washington	1917	Appalachians	(United States)	Darby Field	(England)	
1654	W. Karwendelspitze	2385	Alps	(Austria) (Germany)	Christian Mentzel	(Holy Roman Empire)	
14 Dec 1680*	Säntis	2502	Alps	(Switzerland)	Two priests, a naturalist and a guide	(Old Swiss Confederacy)	
1707	Piz Beverin	2998	Alps	(Switzerland)	Rudolf von Rosenroll	(Old Swiss Confederacy)	
Jul 1726	Monte Cavallo	2251	Alps	(Italy)	Giovanni Girolamo Zanichelli and Dimenico Pietro Stefanelli		
1730	Schesaplana	2965	Alps	(Austria) (Switzerland)	Nicolin Sererhard and two companions	(Old Swiss Confederacy)	
20 Jul 1738	Corazón	4790	Andes	(Ecuador)	Charles Marie de La Condamine, Pierre Bouguer and porters	(France)	
25 Jul 1744	Titlis	3238	Alps	(Switzerland)	Ignaz Herz, Josef Eugen Waser and 2 others	(Old Swiss Confederacy)	
20 Jun 1750	Hekla	1488	Highlands of Iceland	(Iceland)	Eggert Ólafsson	(Iceland)	
1759*	Grintovec	2558	Alps	(Slovenia)	Giovanni Antonio Scopoli	(Austria)	
1762	Ankogel	3252	Alps	(Austria)	Farmer Patschg	(Austria)	
20 Sep 1770	Mont Buet	3096	Alps	(France)	Jean-André Deluc, Guillaume-Antoine Deluc, Bernard Pomet, and party	(Old Swiss Confederacy)	
17 Aug 1771*	Ben Nevis	1334	Grampian Range	(United Kingdom)	James Robertson	(Kingdom of Great Britain)	
ca. 1775	Lomnický štít	2634	Carpathians	(Slovakia)	Jakub Fábry	(Habsburg monarchy)	
26 Aug 1778	Triglav	2864	Alps	(Slovenia)	Lovrenc Willomitzer, Luka Korošec, Matevž Kos, and Štefan Rožič	(Austria)	
31 Aug 1779	Mont Vélan	3727	Alps	(Italy) (Switzerland)	Laurent-Joseph Murith and two hunters from Liddes	(Old Swiss Confederacy)	
1782	Sulzfluh	2817	Alps	(Austria) (Switzerland)	J. B. Catani and L. Pool	(Old Swiss Confederacy)	
1782	Scopi	3190	Alps	(Switzerland)	Placidus a Spescha and Joh. Bagliel	(Old Swiss Confederacy)	
17 Sep 1784	Dôme du Goûter	4304	Alps	(France) (Italy)	Jean-Marie Couttet and François Cuidet	(Duchy of Savoy)	
1784	Dents du Midi	3257	Alps	(Switzerland)	Jean-Maurice Clément	(Old Swiss Confederacy)	
Jul 1786	Mangart	2677	Alps	(Italy) (Slovenia)	Franz Xaver von Wulfen	(Austria)	
8 Aug 1786	Mont Blanc	4808	Alps	(France) (Italy)	Jacques Balmat and Michel Paccard	(Duchy of Savoy)	
1788	Klyuchevskaya Sopka	4750	Kamchatka	(Russia)	Daniel Gauss and two others	(Russian Empire)	
Jul 1789	Rheinwaldhorn	3402	Alps	(Switzerland)	Placidus a Spescha	(Old Swiss Confederacy)	
1792	Oberalpstock	3328	Alps	(Switzerland)	Josef Senoner and Placidus a Spescha	(Austria) (Old Swiss Confederacy)	
2 Aug 1792	Vignemale	3298	Pyrenees	(Spain) (France)	Shepherds under the order of Louis-Philippe Reinhart Junker	(France)	
13 Aug 1792	Klein Matterhorn	3883	Alps	(Switzerland)	Horace-Bénédict de Saussure, Nicolas-Théodore de Saussure, Jean-Marie Couttet, Jean-Baptiste Erin, and five other guides	(Old Swiss Confederacy) (Duchy of Savoy)	
ca. 1795	Großes Wiesbachhorn	3564	Alps	(Austria)	Three brothers named Zorner	(Austria)	
25 Aug 1799	Kleinglockner	3770	Alps	(Austria)	four guides from Heiligenblut (including "the Glokners", often nicknamed Martin and Sepp "Klotz") and Sigmund von Hohenwart	(Austria)	
28 Jul 1800	Großglockner	3797	Alps	(Austria)	the Glokners and two other locals, guiding an hour later parson Mathias Hautzendorfer	(Austria)	
Aug 1800	Watzmann	2713	Alps	(Germany)	Valentin Stanič	(Austria)	
10 Oct 1800	Mount Apo	2954	Apo–Talomo	(Philippines)	Joaquin Rajal, Joseph Montano, Mateo Gisbert, and companions	(Philippines)	
7 Aug 1802	Monte Perdido	3355	Pyrenees	(Spain)	Grégoire Taulat dit Rondo, Laurens and a shepherd	(France)	
13 Aug 1804*	Mount Katahdin	1608	Appalachians	(United States)	William Howe, Amos Patten, Joseph Treat, Samuel 6Call, William Rice, Richard Winslow, and Charles Turner, Jr.	(United States)	
27 Sep 1804	Ortler	3905	Alps	(Italy)	Josef Pichler, Johann Leitner and Johann Klausner	(Austria-Hungary)	
ca. 1808	Grande Sassière	3747	Alps	(France) (Italy)	Bertrand Chaudan and others from Tignes	(France)	
3 Aug 1811	Jungfrau	4158	Alps	(Switzerland)	Hieronymus Meyer and Johann Rudolf Meyer guided by Alois Volken and Joseph Bortis	(Old Swiss Confederacy)	
13 Aug 1813	Breithorn	4164	Alps	(Switzerland)	Henry Maynard, Jean-Marie Couttet, Jean Gras, Jean-Baptiste and Jean-Jacques Érin	(Old Swiss Confederacy)	
Aug 1819	Torstein	2948	Alps	(Austria)	Jackl Buchsteiner	(Austria-Hungary)	
14 Jul 1820	Pikes Peak	4302	Rocky Mountains	(United States)	Edwin James and two others	(United States)	
1 Aug 1820	Zumsteinspitze	4563	Alps	(Italy) (Switzerland)	Joseph and Johann Niklaus Vincent, Joseph Zumstein, Molinatti, Castel and unknown porters	(Kingdom of Sardinia)	
27 Aug 1820*	Zugspitze	2962	Alps	(Germany) (Austria)	Josef Naus, Maier and Johann Georg Tauschl	(Austria-Hungary) (Kingdom of Bavaria)	
20 Sep 1821	Schrankogel	3497	Alps	(Austria)	Johann Georg Hargasser	(Kingdom of Bavaria)	
1 Sep 1824	Tödi	3614	Alps	(Switzerland)	Augustin Bisquolm and Placi Curschellas	(Old Swiss Confederacy)	
1 May 1827	Mount Brown	2791	Canadian Rockies	(Canada)	David Douglas	(United Kingdom)	
30 Jul 1828	Mont Pelvoux	3946	Alps	(France)	Captain Durand, Alexis Liotard and Jacques-Etienne Matheoud	(France)	
1828	Kitzsteinhorn	3203	Alps	(Austria)	Johann Entacher	(Austria)	
1828	Pizzo Tambo	3279	Alps	(Italy) (Switzerland)	Johann Jakob Sulzberger	(Old Swiss Confederacy)	
22 Jul 1829	Mount Elbrus (East)	5621	Caucasus	(Russia)	Khillar Khachirov (expedition led by Heinrich Lenz and General Emmanuel)	(Russian Empire)	
10 Aug 1829	Finsteraarhorn	4272	Alps	(Switzerland)	Jakob Leuthold and Johann Währen	(Old Swiss Confederacy)	
9 Oct 1829*	Mount Ararat	5137		(Turkey)	Friedrich Parrot and Khachatur Abovian	(Armenia) (Germany)	
1830	Schalfkogel	3537	Alps	(Austria)	Frédéric Mercey with guides from Meran and Pfelders	(Austria) (France)	
1832	Hoher Dachstein	2995	Alps	(Austria)	Peter Gappmayr	(Austria)	
1834	Similaun	3606	Alps	(Austria) (Italy)	Josef Raffeiner and Theodor Kaserer	(Austria)	
1834	Gerlachovský štít	2655	Carpathians	(Slovakia)	Ján Still and several hunters	(Austria)	
1 Aug 1835	Piz Linard	3410	Alps	(Switzerland)	Johann Madutz and Oswald Heer	(Old Swiss Confederacy)	
12 Aug 1835	Piz Palü	3898	Alps	(Switzerland)	Johann Madutz, Gian Marchet Colani, Peter and M. Flury and Oswald Heer	(Old Swiss Confederacy)	
23 Aug 1836	Fernerkogel	3294	Alps	(Austria)	Peter Karl Thurwieser, Lipp Schöpf and Jackob Kofler	(Austria)	
1 Sep 1836*	Habicht	3277	Alps	(Austria)	Peter Karl Thurwieser and Ingenuin Krösbacher	(Austria)	
2 Sep 1839	Aiguilles d'Arves	3513	Alps	(France)	Pierre Alexis Magnin and Benoît Nicolas Magnin	(France)	
23 Dec 1839	Mount Egmont	2518	North Island volcanoes	(New Zealand)	Ernst Dieffenbach and James Heberley	(Hesse) (New Zealand)	
30 Jul 1840	Rysy	2503	Carpathians	(Slovakia) (Poland)	Eduard Blásy and Ján Ruman-Driečny Sr.	(Austria)	
14 Jan 1841*	Ras Dashen	4550	Ethiopian Highlands	(Ethiopia)	Pierre V.A. Ferret & Joseph G. Galinier	(France)	
14 Jul 1841	Glittertind	2465	Scandinavian Mts	(Norway)	Harald Nicolai Storm Wergeland and Hans Sletten.	(Norway)	
3 Sep 1841	Großvenediger	3666	Alps	(Austria)	Josef Schwab, Paul Rohregger, Christian Rieß, Peter Meilinger, Ignaz Kürsinger, Anton Ruthner, Franz Spitaler and 17 others	(Austria)	
20 Jul 1842	Aneto	3404	Pyrenees	(Spain)	Albert de Franqueville and Platon de Tchihatcheff guided by Pierre Radonet, Bernard Arrazau, Jean Argarot and Pierre Sanio	(Russian Empire) (France)	
8 Aug 1842	Lauteraarhorn	4042	Alps	(Switzerland)	Melchior Bannholzer and Jakob Leuthold guiding Pierre Jean Édouard Desor, Christian Girard, and Arnold Escher von der Linth	(Switzerland)	
14 Aug 1842	Fremont Peak	4189	Rocky Mountains	(United States)	John C. Fremont, Charles Preuss and Johnny Janisse	(United States)	
12 Sep 1843	Großer Löffler	3376	Alps	(Austria) (Italy)	Markus Vincent Lipold and a chamois hunter from Mayrhofen	(Austria)	
31 Aug 1844	Wetterhorn	3692	Alps	(Switzerland)	Melchior Bannholzer and Hans Jaun	(Switzerland)	
Aug 1845	Weißkugel	3739	Alps	(Austria) (Italy)	Johann Gurschler and Josef Weitthalm	(Austria)	
7 Sep 1846	Piz Kesch	3418	Alps	(Switzerland)	Johann Coaz, Jakob Rascher, Christian Casper and Jon Ragut Tscharner	(Switzerland)	
19 Aug 1847	Schrammacher	3410	Alps	(Austria)	Peter Karl Thurwieser, Georg Lechner and Jakob Huber	(Austria)	
1847	Bazardüzü	4466	Caucasus	(Azerbaijan) (Russia)	A. Aleksandrov	(Russia)	
May 1848*	Pico de Orizaba	5636	Sierra Nevada (Mex)	(Mexico)	F. Maynard, William F. Raynolds, Manigault, Lomax & Rodgers	(United States)	
Aug 1848	Wildspitze	3770	Alps	(Austria)	Leander Klotz and a farmhand	(Austria)	
12 Aug 1848	Monte Rosa (Dunantspitze)	4632	Alps	(Switzerland)	Johann Madutz and Matthias Zumtaugwald	(Switzerland)	
Jul 1850	Galdhøpiggen	2469	Scandinavian Mts	(Norway)	Steinar Sulheim, Ingebrigt N. Flotten and Lars Arnesen	(Norway)	
13 Sep 1850	Piz Bernina	4049	Alps	(Switzerland)	Johann Coaz guided by Jon and Lorenz Ragut Tscharner	(Switzerland)	
1851*	Pico Duarte	3098	Hispaniola	(Dominican Republic)	Robert H. Schomburgk	(United Kingdom)	
27 Aug 1853*	Mount St. Helens	2950	Cascade Range	(United States)	Thomas J. Dryer, John Wilson, ?. Smith and Edwin P. or Charles S. Drew	(United States)	
14 Aug 1854	Mount Shasta	4322	Cascade Range	(United States)	Elias D. Pearce and eight others	(United States)	
24 Aug 1854	Königspitze	3859	Alps	(Italy)	Stephan Steinberger	(Austria-Hungary)	
Aug 1854	Hochgall	3436	Alps	(Austria) (Italy)	Members of a survey party led by Hermann van Acken	(Austria-Hungary)	
Sep 1854	Mount Adams	3743	Cascade Range	(United States)	A. Glenn Aiken, Edward J. Allen, and Andrew J. Burge	(United States)	
1 Aug 1855	Monte Rosa (Dufourspitze)	4634	Alps	(Switzerland)	Ulrich Lauener, Johann and Matthias Zumtaugwald guiding James Smyth, Christopher Smyth, Charles Hudson, John Birkbeck, Edward Stephenson	(Switzerland) (United Kingdom)	
25 Aug 1855	Weissmies	4017	Alps	(Switzerland)	Jakob Christian Häusser and Peter Josef Zurbriggen	(Switzerland)	
11 Jul 1857	Mount Hood	3429	Cascade Range	(United States)	Henry Pittock, W. Lymen Chittenden, Wilbur Cornell, T.A. Wood	(United States)	
15 Aug 1857	Mönch	4107	Alps	(Switzerland)	Christian Almer, Christian Kaufmann, Ulrich Kaufmann and Sigismund Porges	(Austria) (Switzerland)	
19 Sep 1857	Pelmo	3168	Alps	(Italy)	John Ball	(United Kingdom)	
11 Aug 1858	Eiger	3967	Alps	(Switzerland)	Christian Almer and Peter Bohren guiding Charles Barrington	(Switzerland) (United Kingdom)	
11 Sep 1858	Dom	4545	Alps	(Switzerland)	Johann Zumtaugwald, Johann Krönig, Hieronymous Brantschen and John Llewelyn Davies	(Switzerland) (United Kingdom)	
18 Jun 1859	Aletschhorn	4193	Alps	(Switzerland)	Johann Joseph Bennen, Peter Bohren, Victor Tairraz and Francis Fox Tuckett	(France) (Switzerland) (United Kingdom)	
30 Jul 1859	Grand Combin	4314	Alps	(Switzerland)	Charles Sainte-Claire Deville, Daniel Balleys, Emmanuel Balleys, Gaspard Balleys and Basile Dorsaz	(Switzerland)	
13 Aug 1859	Bietschhorn	3934	Alps	(Switzerland)	Johann Siegen, Joseph Aebener, and Leslie Stephen	(Switzerland) (United Kingdom)	
23 Aug 1859	Grivola	3969	Alps	(Italy)	Zachary Cachat	(Kingdom of Sardinia)	
9 Sep 1859	Rimpfischhorn	4199	Alps	(Switzerland)	Melchior Anderegg, Johann Zumtaugwald, Leslie Stephen and Robert Living	(Switzerland) (United Kingdom)	
8 Aug 1860	Grande Casse	3855	Alps	(France)	Michel Croz, Étienne Favre and William Mathews	(Switzerland) (United Kingdom)	
4 Sep 1860	Gran Paradiso	4061	Alps	(Italy)	Michel-Ambroise Payot and Jean Tairraz guiding John Jeremy Cowell and William Dundas	(France) (United Kingdom)	
1860	Monte Civetta	3220	Alps	(Italy)	Simeone De Silvestro	(Italy)	
16 Aug 1861	Schreckhorn	4078	Alps	(Switzerland)	Ulrich Kaufmann, Christian Michel, Peter Michel, and Leslie Stephen	(Switzerland) (United Kingdom)	
19 Aug 1861	Weisshorn	4506	Alps	(Switzerland)	Johann Joseph Bennen, Ulrich Wenger and John Tyndall	(Switzerland) (United Kingdom)	
30 Aug 1861	Monte Viso	3841	Alps	(Italy)	Michel Croz, William Mathews and Frederick William Jacomb	(France) (United Kingdom)	
4 Oct 1861	Mont Pourri	3779	Alps	(France)	Michel Croz	(France)	
18 Dec 1861*	Mount Cameroon	4070		(Cameroon)	Gustav Mann, Richard Francis Burton, Atilano Calvo Iturburu, and Krumen porters	(Province of Hanover) (Portugal) (United Kingdom)	
18 Jul 1862	Dent Blanche	4357	Alps	(Switzerland)	Jean-Baptiste Croz, Johann Krönig, Thomas Stuart Kennedy, and William Wigram	(France) (Switzerland) (United Kingdom)	
Jul 1862	Zuckerhütl	3507	Alps	(Austria)	Alois Tanzer and Joseph Anton Specht	(Austria)	
23 Aug 1862	Monte Disgrazia	3678	Alps	(Italy)	Melchior Anderegg, Leslie Stephen, E. S. Kennedy and Thomas Cox	(Switzerland) (United Kingdom)	
9 Jul 1863	Piz Zupò	3996	Alps	(Italy) (Switzerland)	The teacher Enderlin, the pastor Otto Serardy and the hunter Badrutt	(Switzerland)	
12 Aug 1863	Dent d'Hérens	4171	Alps	(Italy) (Switzerland)	Melchior Anderegg, Jean-Pierre Cacha, Peter Perren guiding F. Crauford Grove, William E. Hall, Reginald S. Macdonald, Montagu Woodmass	(Switzerland) (United Kingdom)	
18 Sep 1863	Antelao	3264	Alps	(Italy)	Paul Grohmann, Francesco Lacedelli, Alessandro Lacedelli, and Matteo Ossi	(Austria) (Italy)	
25 Jun 1864	Barre des Écrins	4102	Alps	(France)	A. W. Moore, Horace Walker, Edward Whymper, Michel Croz, Christian Almer Sr & Jr	(France) (Switzerland) (United Kingdom)	
6 Aug 1864	Wannenhorn	3906	Alps	(Switzerland)	Gottlieb Samuel Studer, Rudolf Lindt, Kaspar Blatter and Peter Sulzer	(Switzerland)	
22 Aug 1864	Zinalrothorn	4221	Alps	(Switzerland)	Jakob Anderegg, Melchior Anderegg, Leslie Stephen and Florence Crauford Grove	(Switzerland) (United Kingdom)	
15 Sep 1864	Adamello	3554	Alps	(Italy)	Giovanni "Pirinello" Caturani and Julius Payer	(Austria)	
28 Sep 1864	Marmolada	3343	Alps	(Italy)	Paul Grohmann, Fulgentio Dimai, and Angelo Dimai	(Austria) (Italy)	
1860s	Mount Tom	4163	Sierra Nevada (U.S.)	(United States)	Thomas Clark guided by Native Americans	(United States)	
28 Jun 1865	Piz Roseg	3937	Alps	(Switzerland)	Jakob Anderegg, A. W. Moore and Horace Walker	(Switzerland) (United Kingdom)	
29 Jun 1865	Aiguille Verte	4121	Alps	(France)	Christian Almer, Franz Biner and Edward Whymper	(Switzerland) (United Kingdom)	
6 Jul 1865	Obergabelhorn	4063	Alps	(Switzerland)	Jakob Anderegg, A. W. Moore and Horace Walker	(Switzerland) (United Kingdom)	
14 Jul 1865	Matterhorn	4478	Alps	(Italy) (Switzerland)	Michel Croz and father and son Peter Taugwalder guiding Edward Whymper, Charles Hudson, Francis Douglas and Douglas Robert Hadow (see also the expedition page)	(France) (Switzerland) (United Kingdom)	
14 Jul 1865	Piz Buin	3312	Alps	(Austria) (Switzerland)	Joseph Anton Specht, Johann Jakob Weilenmann, Jakob Pfitscher and Franz Pöll	(Austria) (Switzerland)	
27 Jul 1867	Piz Badile	3308	Alps	(Italy) (Switzerland)	François Devouassoud, Henri Devouassoud, and W. A. B. Coolidge	(France) (United States)	
21 Feb 1868	El Toro E	4727	Andes	(Venezuela)	Pierre Bourgoin	(France)	
30 Jun 1868	Grandes Jorasses	4208	Alps	(France) (Italy)	Melchior Anderegg, Johann Jaun, Julien Grange and Horace Walker	(Switzerland) (Italy) (United Kingdom)	
1 Jul 1868	Kazbek	5047	Caucasus	(Georgia (country)) (Russia)	François Devouassoud, Douglas Freshfield, A. W. Moore, and Charles Comyns Tucker.	(France) (United Kingdom)	
17 Aug 1868	Mount Baker	3286	Cascade Range	(United States)	Edmund Thomas Coleman, Edward Eldridge, John Tennant, David Ogilvy and Thomas Stratton	(United Kingdom) (United States)	
23 Aug 1868*	Longs Peak	4345	Rocky Mountains	(United States)	John Wesley Powell, Walter Powell, Lewis Keplinger, Samuel Garman, Williams Byers, Jack Sumner and Ned Faarrell	(United States)	
13 Aug 1869	Langkofel	3181	Alps	(Italy)	Peter Salcher, Franz Innerkofler and Paul Grohmann	(Austria-Hungary)	
20 Aug 1869	Große Zinne/ Cima Grande	2999	Alps	(Italy)	Franz Innerkofler, Peter Salcher and Paul Grohmann	(Austria-Hungary)	
29 Sep 1869	Watzespitze	3533	Alps	(Austria)	Alois Ennemoser	(Austria-Hungary)	
7 Jul 1870	Ailefroide	3954	Alps	(France)	Ulrich Almer, Christian Almer and W. A. B. Coolidge	(Switzerland) (United States)	
17 Aug 1870	Mount Rainier	4392	Cascade Range	(United States)	Hazard Stevens and P. B. Van Trump	(United States)	
29 Aug 1871	Mount Lyell	3999	Sierra Nevada (U.S.)	(United States)	John Boies Tileston	(United States)	
23 Apr 1872	Naiguatá	2765	Venezuelan Coastal Range	(Venezuela)	James Mudie Spence, Anton Goering, Ramón and Nicanor Bolet Peraza and expedition	(United Kingdom) (Germany) (Venezuela)	
Oct 1872	Mount Ritter	4008	Sierra Nevada (U.S.)	(United States)	John Muir	(United States)	
28 Nov 1872*	Cotopaxi	5897	Andes	(Ecuador)	Wilhelm Reiss and Ángel Escobar	(Colombia) (Germany)	
18 Aug 1873	Mount Whitney	4421	Sierra Nevada (U.S.)	(United States)	Charles Begole, Albert Johnson, John Lucas	(United States)	
28 Jul 1874	Mount Elbrus (West)	5642	Caucasus	(Russia)	Peter Knubel, Frederick Gardiner, Horace Walker, and Florence Crauford Grove	(Switzerland) (United Kingdom)	
14 Aug 1874*	Blanca Peak	4372	Rocky Mountains	(United States)	Wheeler Survey	(United States)	
1874*	Mount Elbert	4404	Rocky Mountains	(United States)	Henry W. Stuckle	(United States)	
12 Oct 1875	Half Dome	2693	Sierra Nevada (U.S.)	(United States)	George Anderson	(United Kingdom)	
21 Jul 1876	Store Skagastølstind	2405	Scandinavian Mts	(Norway)	William Cecil Slingsby	(United Kingdom)	
16 Aug 1877	Meije	3983	Alps	(France)	E. Boileau de Castelnau, father and son Pierre Gaspard	(France)	
Dec 1877*	Mount Kerinci	3805	Barisan Mountains	(Indonesia)	Arend Ludolf van Hasselt en Daniël David Veth	(Netherlands)	
12 Sep 1878	Aiguille du Dru	3754	Alps	(France)	Alexander Burgener and Kaspar Maurer guiding Clinton Thomas Dent and James Walker Hartley	(Switzerland) (United Kingdom)	
8 Jan 1879	Mount Ruapehu	2797	Taupō Volcanic Zone	(New Zealand)	George Beetham, Joseph Prime Maxwell	(New Zealand)	
29 Aug 1879	Petit Dru	3733	Alps	(France)	Jean Charlet-Straton, Prosper Payot and Frédéric Folliguet	(France)	
4 Jan 1880	Chimborazo	6270	Andes	(Ecuador)	Jean-Antoine Carrel, Louis Carrel, and Edward Whymper	(Italy) (United Kingdom)	
10 Mar 1880	Antisana	5704	Andes	(Ecuador)	Jean-Antoine Carrel, Louis Carrel, and Edward Whymper	(Italy) (United Kingdom)	
4 Apr 1880	Cayambe	5790	Andes	(Ecuador)	Jean-Antoine Carrel, Louis Carrel, and Edward Whymper	(Italy) (United Kingdom)	
10 Oct 1880	Mount Apo	2954	Mindanao	(Philippines)	Joaquin Rajal, Joseph Montano, Mateo Gisbert, Datu Manig and others	(Philippines) (France)	
3 Aug 1881	Aiguille du Grépon	3482	Alps	(France)	Albert Mummery, Alexander Burgener and Benedikt Venetz	(Switzerland) (United Kingdom)	
28 Jul 1882	Dent du Géant	4013	Alps	(France) (Italy)	Baptiste, Daniel & Jean-Joseph Maquignaz	(Italy)	
22 Aug 1883	Kebnekaise	2111	Scandinavian Mts	(Sweden)	Charles Rabot, Pehr Abrahamsson and Hans Monsen	(France) (Sweden)	
8 Oct 1883	Kabru E	7338	Himalayas	(India) (Nepal)	Emil Boss, Ulrich Kaufmann and William Graham	(Switzerland) (United Kingdom)	
3 Jul 1885	Pan de Azúcar	4680	Andes	(Venezuela)	Wilhelm Sievers	(Germany)	
31 Jul 1885	Aiguille Blanche de Peuterey	4112	Alps	(Italy)	Émile Rey, Ambros Supersaxo, Aloys Anthamatten and Henry Seymour King	(Italy) (Switzerland) (United Kingdom)	
3 Mar 1888	Mount Kinabalu	4095	Crocker Range	(Malaysia)	John Whitehead	(United Kingdom)	
24 Jul 1888	Dykh-Tau	5205	Caucasus	(Russia)	Albert Mummery and Heinrich Zurfluh	(Switzerland) (United Kingdom)	
7 Sep 1888	Shkhara	5193	Caucasus	(Georgia (country)) (Russia)	Ulrich Almer, John Garforth Cockin and Christian Roth	(Switzerland) (United Kingdom)	
12 Sep 1888	East Janga	5051	Caucasus	(Georgia (country)) (Russia)	Ulrich Almer, John Garforth Cockin and Christian Roth	(Switzerland) (United Kingdom)	
11 Jun 1889*	Mount Victoria	4038	Owen Stanley Range	(Papua New Guinea)	William MacGregor and a large party	(Papua New Guinea) (United Kingdom)	
6 Oct 1889	Kibo	5895	Kilimanjaro	(Tanzania)	Hans Meyer and Ludwig Purtscheller	(Austria-Hungary) (Germany)	
Nov 1889*	Iztaccihuatl	5230	Sierra Nevada (Mex)	(Mexico)	James de Salis	(Switzerland)	
26 Jul 1890	Mount Sir Donald	3284	Columbia Mts	(Canada)	Emil Huber, Carl Sulzer, Harry Cooper	(Canada) (Switzerland)	
4 Jul 1893	Devils Tower	1558	Rocky Mountains	(United States)	William Rogers and Willard Ripley	(United States)	
17 Aug 1894	Mount Temple	3544	Canadian Rockies	(Canada)	Walter Wilcox, Samuel Allen and Louis Fox Frissel	(United States)	
25 Dec 1894	Aoraki / Mount Cook	3764	Southern Alps	(New Zealand)	Tom Fyfe, Jack Clarke and George Graham	(New Zealand)	
6 Feb 1895	Mount Tasman	3497	Southern Alps	(New Zealand)	E. A. Fitzgerald, Matthias Zurbriggen and Jack Clarke	(New Zealand) (Switzerland) (United States)	
22 Sep 1895	Delago Tower	2790	Alps	(Italy)	Hermann Delago	(Austria-Hungary)	
14 Jan 1897*	Aconcagua	6959	Andes	(Argentina)	Matthias Zurbriggen	(Switzerland)	
12 Apr 1897	Tupungato	6570	Andes	(Argentina) (Chile)	Matthias Zurbriggen and Stuart Vines	(Switzerland) (United Kingdom)	
31 Jul 1897	Mount Saint Elias	5489	Saint Elias Mts	(Canada) (United States)	Joseph Petigax, Antoine Maquignaz, Laurent Croux, André Pellisier guiding Luigi Amedeo, Francesco Gonella, Vittorio Sella, Filippo de Filippi, Umberto Cagni, Erminio Botta	(Italy)	
11 Aug 1898	Grand Teton	4197	Rocky Mountains	(United States)	William Owen, Franklin Spalding, Frank Peterson, and John Shive	(United States)	
9 Sep 1898	Illimani	6438	Andes	(Bolivia)	Antoine Maquignaz, Louis Pellissier and William Martin Conway	(Italy) (United Kingdom)	
26 Dec 1898	Jade Mountain	3952		(Taiwan)	Karl Theodor Stöpel, Hussung and Biong	(Germany) (Taiwan)	
17 Aug 1899	Campanile Basso	2883	Alps	(Italy)	Carl Berger and Otto Ampferer	(Austria-Hungary)	
13 Sep 1899	Batian	5199	Mount Kenya	(Kenya)	César Ollier and Joseph Brocherel guiding Halford Mackinder	(Italy) (United Kingdom)	
3 Sep 1901	Mount Assiniboine	3618	Canadian Rockies	(Canada)	Christian Bohren, Christian Hasler, James Outram	(Switzerland) (United Kingdom)	
Jun 1902	Alam-Kuh	4848	Alborz	(Iran)	Alfred and Joseph Bornmüller	(Germany)	
19 Jul 1902	Mount Columbia	3747	Canadian Rockies	(Canada)	Christian Kaufmann guiding James Outram	(Switzerland) (United Kingdom)	
10 Aug 1902	Mount Forbes	3612	Canadian Rockies	(Canada)	Christian and Hans Kaufmann guiding J. Norman Collie, James Outram, Hugh E.M. Stutfield, George M. Weed and Herman Woolley,	(Switzerland) (United Kingdom)	
21 Aug 1902	Mount Bryce	3507	Canadian Rockies	(Canada)	Christian Kaufmann guiding James Outram	(Switzerland) (United Kingdom)	
25 Jul 1903	North Palisade	4343	Sierra Nevada (U.S.)	(United States)	James S. Hutchinson, Joseph N. LeConte, James K. Moffitt	(United States)	
26 Jul 1903	Ushba	4710	Caucasus	(Georgia (country))	Adolf Schulze, Robert Hebling, Friedrich Reichert, Oscar Schuster, Albert Weber	(Austria-Hungary) (Germany) (Switzerland)	
1903*	Karisimbi	4507	Virunga Mountains	(Democratic Republic of the Congo) (Rwanda)	Father Barthélémy	(Belgium)	
18 Jul 1904	Mount Humphreys	4265	Sierra Nevada (U.S.)	(United States)	Edward C. Hutchinson and James S. Hutchinson	(United States)	
6 Sep 1904	Hozomeen Mountain	2460	Cascade Range	(United States)	Sledge Tatum, George E. Loudon	(United States)	
Dec 1904*	Mount Meru	4566		(Tanzania)	Fritz Jäger, Carl Uhlig and porters	(Germany)	
18 Jun 1906	Mount Stanley	5109	Rwenzori Mts	(Democratic Republic of the Congo) (Uganda)	Joseph Petigax, César Ollier, Joseph Brocherel, and Luigi Amedeo, Duke of the Abruzzi	(Italy)	
12 Jun 1907	Trisul	7120	Himalayas	(India)	Tom Longstaff, Alexis Brocherel, Henri Brocherel and Karbir	(India) (Italy) (United Kingdom)	
13 Aug 1907	Mount Olympus (US)	2432	Olympic Mts	(United States)	Lorenz A. Nelson and 10 other members of the Mountaineers Club	(United States)	
10 Mar 1908	Mount Erebus	3794	Transantarctic Mts	(Antarctica)	Jameson Adams, Edgeworth David, Alistair Forbes MacKay, Eric Marshall, and Douglas Mawson	(United Kingdom)	
13 Aug 1908	Herðubreið	1682	Highlands of Iceland	(Iceland)	Sigurður Sumarliðason and Hans Reck	(Germany) (Iceland)	
28 Aug 1908	Maroon Bells	4317	Rocky Mountains	(United States)	Percy Hagerman	(United States)	
2 Sep 1908	Huascaran N.	6655	Andes	(Peru)	Annie Smith Peck, Gabriel Zumtaugwald and Rudolf Taugwalder	(Switzerland) (United States)	
23 Nov 1909	Mount Aspiring / Tititea	3033	Southern Alps	(New Zealand)	Bernard Head, Jack Clarke and Alec Graham	(New Zealand)	
17 Mar 1910	El Toro W	4727	Andes	(Venezuela)	Alfredo Jahn	(Venezuela)	
10 Apr 1910	Denali N	5935	Alaska Range	(United States)	The Sourdough expedition: Tom Lloyd, Peter Anderson, Billy Taylor, and Charles McGonagall	(United States)	
30 Jul 1910	Stetind	1394	Scandinavian Mts	(Norway)	Ferdinand Schjelderup, Carl Wilhelm Rubenson, and Alf Bonnevie Bryn	(Norway)	
11 Dec 1910	Mucuñuque	4608	Andes	(Venezuela)	Alfredo Jahn	(Venezuela)	
18 Jan 1911	Humboldt	4940	Andes	(Venezuela)	Alfredo Jahn and Luis Hedderich	(Venezuela)	
13 Mar 1911	Mitre Peak	1692		(New Zealand)	James Robert Dennistoun	(New Zealand)	
14 Jun 1911	Pauhunri	7128	Himalayas	(India)	Alec Kellas and the Sherpas Sony and "Tuny's brother"	(India) (United Kingdom)	
15 Oct 1911*	Coropuna	6425	Andes	(Peru)	Hiram Bingham, Alejandro Coello, Mariano Gamarra, and Herman L. Tucker	(Peru) (United States)	
14 Dec 1911*	Wagagai	4321	Mount Elgon	(Uganda) (Kenya)	Robert Stigler, Richard Storch, Rudolf Kmunke (disputed) and Ugandan guides and carriers	(Austria-Hungary) (Uganda)	
19 May 1912	Mount Blackburn	4996	Wrangell Mts	(United States)	Dora Keen and George Handy	(United States)	
24 Jun 1912	Mount Sir Sandford	3519	Columbia Mts	(Canada)	Edward Feuz Jr., Rudolph Aemmer, Howard Palmer, and Edward W. D. Holway	(Canada) (Switzerland)	
29 Jul 1912	Mawenzi (Meyer Peak)	5148	Kilimanjaro	(Tanzania)	Eduard Oehler and Fritz Klute	(Germany)	
Oct 1912	Mount Bangeta	4121	Saruwaged Range	(Papua New Guinea)	Christian Keyser and (probably) local porters	(Germany) (Papua New Guinea)	
21 Feb 1913	Puncak Trikora	4750	Maoke Mountains	(Indonesia)	Alphons Franssen Herderschee, Paul Hubrecht and Gerard Versteeg	(Netherlands)	
7 Jun 1913	Denali S	6168	Alaska Range	(United States)	Hudson Stuck, Harry Karstens, Walter Harper, and Robert Tatum	(United States)	
31 Jul 1913	Mount Robson	3954	Canadian Rockies	(Canada)	Conrad Kain, Albert MacCarthy, and William Wasbrough Foster	(Austria-Hungary) (United States)	
2 Aug 1913	Mount Olympus	2918		(Greece)	Christos Kakkalos, Frédéric Boissonnas and Daniel Baud-Bovy	(Greece) (Switzerland)	
26 Jul 1914	Belukha	4506	Altai Mountains	(Kazakhstan) (Russia)	Boris Tronov and Mikhail V. Tronov	(Russia)	
19 Jul 1916	Mount Louis	2682	Canadian Rockies	(Canada)	Conrad Kain and Albert MacCarthy	(Austria-Hungary) (United States)	
24 Jul 1916	Crestone Peak	4357	Rocky Mountains	(United States)	Albert R. Ellingwood, Frances Rogers, Eleanor Davis Ehrman and Joe Deutschbein	(United States)	
29 Aug 1916	Bugaboo Spire	3204	Columbia Mts	(Canada)	Conrad Kain, Albert MacCarthy, Bess MacCarthy, and John Vincent	(Austria-Hungary) (United States)	
10 May 1919	Huayna Potosí	6066	Andes	(Bolivia)	Rudolf Dienst and Otto Lohse	(Germany)	
11 Jun 1919	Janq'u Uma	6427	Andes	(Bolivia)	Rudolf Dienst and Adolf Schulze	(Germany)	
12 Aug 1920	Mount Cleveland	3194	Rocky Mountains	(United States)	Harry R. Horn, John F. Habbe and Frank B. Wynn	(United States)	
28 Aug 1920	Lizard Head	3999	Rocky Mountains	(United States)	Albert R. Ellingwood and Barton Hoag	(United States)	
22 Jul 1922	Mount Moran	3842	Rocky Mountains	(United States)	LeGrand Hardy, Bennet McNulty and Ben C. Rich	(United States)	
25 Jul 1922	Gannett Peak	4209	Rocky Mountains	(United States)	Arthur C. Tate and Floyd J. Stahlnaker	(United States)	
12 Jun 1923*	Jbel Toubkal	4167	Atlas Mountains	(Morocco)	René de Segonzac, Vincent Berger, and Hubert Dolbeau	(France)	
29 Aug 1923	Granite Peak	3904	Rocky Mountains	(United States)	Elers Koch, James C. Whitham and Robert T. Ferguson	(United States)	
23 Jun 1925	Mount Logan	5959	Saint Elias Mts	(Canada)	Albert MacCarthy, Fred Lambart, William Foster, Andy Taylor, Norman Read and Allen Carpé	(Canada) (United States)	
21 Jul 1925	Mount Alberta	3619	Canadian Rockies	(Canada)	Yuko Maki, Heinrich Fuhrer, Hans Kohler, Jean Weber, Masanobu Hatano, Natagene Okabe, Seiichi Hashimoto, Tanezo Hayakawa, Yukio Mita	(Japan) (Switzerland)	
24 Jun 1926	Mount Russell	4296	Sierra Nevada (U.S.)	(United States)	Norman Clyde	(United States)	
25 Jul 1927	Mikeno	4437	Virunga Mountains	(Democratic Republic of the Congo)	Fathers Van Hoef and Depluit, Mr and Mrs Leonard	(Belgium)	
7 Jun 1928	Illampu	6368	Andes	(Bolivia)	Hans Pfann, Alfred Horeschowsky, Hugo Hortnagel, Erwin Hein	(Austria) (Germany)	
27 Jun 1928	Clyde Minaret	3740	Sierra Nevada (U.S.)	(United States)	Norman Clyde	(United States)	
25 Sep 1928	Lenin Peak	7134	Pamir Mountains	(Kyrgyzstan) (Tajikistan)	Karl Wien, Eugen Allwein and Erwin Schneider	(Austria) (Germany)	
3 Jun 1930	Jongsong Peak	7462	Himalayas	(India) (Nepal) (China)	Hermann Hoerlin and Erwin Schneider	(Austria) (Germany)	
2 Jul 1930	Mount Bona	5005	Saint Elias Mts	(United States)	Allen Carpé, Terris Moore, Andy Taylor	(United States)	
8 Jun 1931	Mount Fairweather	4671	Saint Elias Mts	(Canada) (United States)	Allen Carpé and Terris Moore	(United States)	
21 Jun 1931	Kamet	7756	Himalayas	(India)	Frank Smythe, Eric Shipton, R.L. Holdsworth, Lewa Sherpa	(United Kingdom)	
5 Sep 1931	Khan Tengri	7010	Tian Shan	(Kazakhstan) (Kyrgyzstan) (China)	Mikhail Pogrebetsky, Boris Tjurin, Franz Sauberer	(Austria) (Soviet Union)	
1931	Mount Tahat	2918	Hoggar	(Algeria)	Edouard Wyss-Dunant	(Switzerland)	
20 Jul 1932	Huascaran S.	6746	Andes	(Peru)	Franz Bernard, Phillip Borchers, Erwin Hein, Hermann Hoerlin, and Erwin Schneider	(Austria) (Germany)	
3 Aug 1932	Chopicalqui	6345	Andes	(Peru)	Phillip Borchers, Erwin Hein, Hermann Hoerlin, and Erwin Schneider	(Austria) (Germany)	
12 Sep 1932	Huandoy N.	6395	Andes	(Peru)	Erwin Hein and Erwin Schneider	(Austria)	
28 Oct 1932	Minya Konka	7556	Daxue Shan	(China)	Terris Moore, Richard Burdsall	(United States)	
3 Sep 1933	Ismoil Somoni Peak	7495	Pamirs	(Tajikistan)	Yevgeniy Abalakov	(Soviet Union)	
18 Jan 1934*	Mercedario	6710	Andes	(Argentina)	Adam Karpiński and Wiktor Ostrowski	(Poland)	
6 Aug 1934	Mount Foraker	5304	Alaska Range	(United States)	Charles Houston, T. Graham Brown, Chychele Waterston	(United States) (United Kingdom)	
12 Aug 1934	Sia Kangri	7422	Karakoram	(China) (Pakistan)	Hans Ertl and Albert Höcht	(Germany)	
5 Jan 1935	Bolívar	4978	Andes	(Venezuela)	Enrique Bourgoin, Heriberto Márquez, Domingo Peña	(Venezuela)	
16 Aug 1935	Gunnbjørn Fjeld	3694	Watkins Range	(Greenland)	Augustine Courtauld, Jack Longland, Ebbe Munck, Harold G. & Lawrence Wager	(United Kingdom)	
Aug 1935	Lingtren	6749	Himalayas	(Nepal) (China)	Eric Shipton & Dan Bryant	(United Kingdom) (New Zealand)	
16 Jul 1936	Monarch Mountain	3555	Coast Mountains	(Canada)	Henry Hall and Hans Fuhrer	(Switzerland) (United States)	
21 Jul 1936	Mount Waddington	4019	Coast Mountains	(Canada)	Fritz Wiessner and William P. House	(United States)	
28 Jul 1936	Siula Grande	6344	Andes	(Peru)	Arnold Awerzger and Erwin Schneider	(Austria)	
29 Aug 1936	Nanda Devi	7816	Himalayas	(India)	Bill Tilman and Noel Odell (see also the expedition page)	(United Kingdom)	
23 Sep 1936	Siniolchu	6888	Himalayas	(India)	Karl Wien and Adi Göttner	(Germany)	
5 Dec 1936	Mount Carstensz	4900	Maoke Mountains	(Indonesia)	Anton Colijn, Jean Jacques Dozy, Frits Wissel	(Netherlands)	
26 Feb 1937	Ojos del Salado	6893	Andes	(Argentina) (Chile)	Jan Alfred Szczepański and Justyn Wojsznis	(Poland)	
21 May 1937	Jomolhari	7326	Himalayas	(Bhutan) (China)	Freddie Spencer Chapman, Pasang Dawa Lama	(Nepal) (United Kingdom)	
9 Jul 1937	Mount Lucania	5240	Saint Elias Mts	(Canada)	Bradford Washburn and Robert Hicks Bates	(United States)	
28 Jul 1937	Devils Tower	1637	Rocky Mountains	(United States)	Fritz Wiessner, William P. House, Lawrence P. Coveney	(United States)	
12 Aug 1937	Mana	7272	Himalayas	(India)	Frank Smythe	(United Kingdom)	
Aug 1937	Kinnerly Peak	3032	Rocky Mountains	(United States)	Norman Clyde, Ed Hall, Richard K. Hill and Braeme Gigos	(United States)	
19 Jun 1938	Mount Marcus Baker	4016	Chugach Mts	(United States)	Norman Bright, Peter Gabriel, Norman Dyhrenfurth, Bradford Washburn	(Switzerland) (United States)	
21 Jul 1938	Mount Sanford	4949	Wrangell Mts	(United States)	Terris Moore and Bradford Washburn	(United States)	
15 Aug 1938*	Mount Wilhelm	4509	Bismarck Range	(Papua New Guinea)	Leigh Vial and 2 locals	(Australia) (Papua New Guinea)	
19 Sep 1938	Peak Pobeda	7439	Tian Shan	(Kyrgyzstan) (China)	Leonid Gutman, Evgenyi Ivanov, Alexander Sidorenko	(Soviet Union)	
1938	Pik Talgar	4979	Tian Shan	(Kazakhstan)	L. Kutuchtin, G. Makatrov and I. Kropotov	(Soviet Union)	
Feb 1939	La Concha	4922	Andes	(Venezuela)	Franz Weiss and Albert Günther	(Germany) (Venezuela) (United Kingdom)	
2 Feb 1939	Pico Simón Bolívar	5700	Sra Nevada de Sta Marta	(Colombia)	Erwin Kraus, Guido Pichler, Enrico Praolini	(Austria) (Colombia) (Italy)	
16 Mar 1939	Pico Cristóbal Colón	5700	Sra Nevada de Sta Marta	(Colombia)	Enrico Praolini, Walter A. Wood, Anderson Bakerwell	(Italy) (United States)	
29 May 1939	Kirat Chuli	7365	Himalayas	(India) (Nepal)	Ernst Grob, Herbert Paidar, and Ludwig Schmaderer	(Germany) (Switzerland)	
5 Jul 1939	Dunagiri	7066	Himalayas	(India)	André Roch, Fritz Steuri Jr., David Zogg	(Switzerland)	
26 Aug 1939	Sajama	6550	Andes	(Bolivia)	Josef Prem and Wilfrid Kühm	(Austria)	
12 Oct 1939	Shiprock	2188		(United States)	David Brower, Raffi Bedayn, Bestor Robinson and John Dyer	(United States)	
3 Feb 1940	Bonpland	4883	Andes	(Venezuela)	Albert Günther	(United Kingdom)	
Apr 1941	Kunturiri	5648	Andes	(Bolivia)	Wilfrid Kühm	(Germany)	
7 Aug 1941	Mount Hayes	4216	Alaska Range	(United States)	Bradford Washburn, Barbara Washburn, Benjamin Ferris, Sterling Hendricks, Henry Hall, William Shand	(United States)	
Dec 1943	Monte San Lorenzo	3706	Patagonia	(Argentina) (Chile)	Alberto María De Agostini	(Italy)	
Apr 1946	El León	4740	Andes	(Venezuela)	Baltazar Trujillo and Hugo Matheus	(Venezuela)	
25 Aug 1946	Devils Thumb	2767	Coast Mountains	(Canada) (United States)	Fred Beckey, Clifford Schmidtke, Bob Craig	(United States)	
3 Sep 1947	Lost Arrow Spire	2112	Sierra Nevada (U.S.)	(United States)	John Salathé and Ax Nelson	(United States)	
20 Jul 1948	Nevado Santa Cruz	6241	Andes	(Peru)	Frédéric Marmillod and Ali Szepessy-Schaurek	(Hungary) (Switzerland)	
5 Jul 1949	Mount Vancouver	4812	Saint Elias Mts	(Canada) (United States)	William Hainsworth, Alan Bruce-Robertson, Bob McCarter, Noel Odell	(United Kingdom) (United States)	
3 Jun 1950	Annapurna	8091	Himalayas	(Nepal)	Maurice Herzog and Louis Lachenal (see also the expedition page)	(France)	
21 Jul 1950	Tirich Mir	7708	Hindu Kush	(Pakistan)	Arne Næss, Per Kvernberg, Henry Berg, Tony Streather	(Norway) (United Kingdom)	
31 Jul 1950	Yerupajá	6617	Andes	(Peru)	David Harrah and James Maxwell	(United States)	
27 Jul 1951	Mount Hubbard	4557	Saint Elias Mts	(Canada) (United States)	Nicholas Clifford, Robert Bates, Peter Wood and Walter Wood	(United States)	
2 Feb 1952	Fitz Roy	3405	Patagonia	(Argentina) (Chile)	Lionel Terray & Guido Magnone	(France) (Italy)	
6 Jun 1952	King Peak	5173	Saint Elias Mts	(Canada)	Keith Hart and Elton Thayer	(United States)	
4 Jul 1952	Mount Augusta	4289	Saint Elias Mts	(Canada) (United States)	Peter Schoening, Victor Josendal, Bill Niendorf, Richard E. McGowen, Bob Yeasting, Gibson Reynolds, Tom Morris, Verl Rogers	(United States)	
7 Jul 1952	Huantsán	6369	Andes	(Peru)	Lionel Terray, Cees G. Egeler and Tom de Booy	(France) (Netherlands)	
5 Aug 1952	Salcantay	6271	Andes	(Peru)	Fred D. Ayres, David Michael, Graham Matthews, George I. Bell, Claude Kogan, Bernard Pierre	(France) (United States)	
1 Dec 1952	Monte San Valentin	4058	Patagonia	(Chile)	Otto Meiling and members of Club Andino Bariloche	(Argentina)	
29 May 1953	Mount Everest	8848	Himalayas	(Nepal) (China)	Tenzing Norgay and Edmund Hillary (see also the expedition page)	(Nepal) (New Zealand)	
Jun 1953	Chamar	7187	Himalayas	(Nepal)	Maurice Bishop and Namgyal Sherpa	(Nepal) (New Zealand)	
3 Jul 1953	Nanga Parbat	8126	Himalayas	(Pakistan)	Hermann Buhl (see also the expedition page)	(Austria)	
13 Jul 1953	Mount Asgard	2015	Baffin Mountains	(Canada)	Jürg Marmet, Hans Röthlisberger, Hans Weber and Fritz Hans Schwarzenbach	(Switzerland)	
24 Jul 1953	Ausangate	6372	Andes	(Peru)	Fritz März, Heinrich Harrer, Heinz Steinmetz, and Jürgen Wellenkamp	(Austria) (West Germany)	
28 Jul 1953	Nun	7135	Himalayas	(India)	Pierre Vittoz, Claude Kogan	(France) (Switzerland)	
19 Jun 1954	Mount Deborah	3761	Alaska Range	(United States)	Fred Beckey, Heinrich Harrer, Henry Meybohm	(Austria) (West Germany) (United States)	
4 Jul 1954	Mount Hunter	4442	Alaska Range	(United States)	Fred Beckey, Heinrich Harrer, Henry Meybohm	(Austria) (West Germany) (United States)	
31 Jul 1954	K2	8611	Karakorum	(Pakistan) (China)	Achille Compagnoni and Lino Lacedelli (see also the expedition page)	(Italy)	
19 Oct 1954	Cho Oyu	8201	Himalayas	(Nepal) (China)	Herbert Tichy, Sepp Jöchler and Pasang Dawa Lama	(Austria) (Nepal)	
30 Oct 1954	Chomo Lonzo	7804	Himalayas	(China)	Lionel Terray and Jean Couzy	(France)	
15 May 1955	Makalu	8481	Himalayas	(Nepal) (China)	Lionel Terray and Jean Couzy (see also the expedition page)	(France)	
25 May 1955	Kangchenjunga	8586	Himalayas	(Nepal) (India)	George Band and Joe Brown (see also the expedition page)	(United Kingdom)	
24 Oct 1955	Ganesh I	7422	Himalayas	(Nepal) (China)	Raymond Lambert, Claude Kogan, Eric Gauchat	(France) (Switzerland)	
18 May 1956	Lhotse	8516	Himalayas	(Nepal)	Fritz Luchsinger and Ernst Reiss	(Switzerland)	
9 May 1956	Manaslu	8156	Himalayas	(Nepal)	Toshio Imanishi and Gyalzen Norbu	(Japan) (Nepal)	
6 Jul 1956	Muztagh Tower	7276	Karakoram	(China) (Pakistan)	John Hartog, Joe Brown, Tom Patey and Ian McNaught-Davis	(United Kingdom)	
7 Jul 1956	Gasherbrum II	8034	Karakorum	(Pakistan) (China)	Fritz Moravec, Sepp Larch and Hans Willenpart	(Austria)	
31 Jul 1956	Chakrarahu	6108	Andes	(Peru)	Lionel Terray, Maurice Davaille, Claude Gaudin, Pierre Souriac, Robert Sennelier	(France)	
1956	Muztagh Ata	7546	Kunlun Mountains	(China)	E.A. Beletsky leading a large party (including Liu Lianman)	(China) (Soviet Union)	
1957	Girls Mountain	1870	Chugach Mountains	(United States)	Austin Post and USGS Party	(United States)	
29 May 1957	Pirámide	5885	Andes	(Peru)	Günter Hauser, Berhard Huhn and Horst Wiedmann	(West Germany)	
2 Jun 1957	Machhapuchhare	6993	Himalayas	(Nepal)	Wilfrid Noyce and David Cox	(United Kingdom)	
9 Jun 1957	Broad Peak	8047	Karakoram	(Pakistan)	Fritz Wintersteller, Marcus Schmuck, Kurt Diemberger and Hermann Buhl	(Austria)	
19 Jun 1957	Skil Brum	7410	Karakoram	(Pakistan)	Marcus Schmuck and Fritz Wintersteller	(Austria)	
20 Jun 1957	Alpamayo	5947	Andes	(Peru)	Günter Hauser, Berhard Huhn, Frieder Knauss, and Horst Wiedmann	(West Germany)	
12 Jul 1957	Jirishanca	6094	Andes	(Peru)	Toni Egger and Siegfried Jungmeir	(Austria)	
27 Dec 1957	Cerro Paine Grande	2884	Patagonian Andes	(Chile)	Jean Bich, Leonardo Carrel, Toni Gobbi, Camillo Pellissier and Pierino Pession	(Italy)	
21 Jun 1958	Rakaposhi	7788	Karakoram	(Pakistan)	Mike Banks and Tom Patey	(United Kingdom) (United States)	
5 Jul 1958	Gasherbrum I	8080	Karakorum	(Pakistan) (China)	Pete Schoening and Andy Kauffman	(United States)	
4 Aug 1958	Haramosh	7397	Karakoram	(Pakistan)	Heinrich Roiss, Stefan Pauer, Franz Mandl	(Austria)	
4 Aug 1958	Chogolisa II	7654	Karakoram	(Pakistan)	Masao Fujihira and Kazumasa Hirai	(Japan)	
6 Aug 1958	Gasherbrum IV	7925	Karakoram	(Pakistan)	Walter Bonatti and Carlo Mauri	(Italy)	
19 Jul 1959	Kanjut Sar	7760	Karakoram	(Pakistan)	Camillo Pellissier	(Italy)	
24 Aug 1959	Saraghrar	7349	Hindu Kush	(Pakistan)	Franco Alletto, Paolo Consiglio, Giancarlo Castelli and Betto Pinelli	(Italy)	
9 Sep 1959	Puncak Mandala	4760	Maoke Mountains	(Indonesia)	Herman Verstappen, Arthur Escher, Max Tissing, Jan de Wijn & Piet ter Laag	(Netherlands)	
13 May 1960	Dhaulagiri	8167	Himalayas	(Nepal)	Kurt Diemberger, Ernst Forrer, Albin Schelbert, Peter Diener, Nawang Dorje, Nima Dorje. Climbing expedition led by Max Eiselin.	(Austria) (West Germany) (Nepal) (Switzerland)	
17 May 1960	Annapurna II	7937	Himalayas	(Nepal)	Richard H. Grant, Chris Bonington, Ang Nyima	(India) (Nepal) (United Kingdom)	
24 May 1960	Himalchuli	7893	Himalayas	(Nepal)	Hisashi Tanabe, Masahiro Harada	(Japan)	
9 Jun 1960	Distaghil Sar	7885	Karakoram	(Pakistan)	Günther Stärker and Diether Marchart	(Austria)	
6 Jul 1960	Masherbrum	7821	Karakoram	(Pakistan)	George Bell and Willi Unsoeld	(United States)	
29 Jul 1960	Mount Proboscis	2610	Mackenzie Mts	(Canada)	Bill Buckingham, Mason C. Hoadley, Stuart Krebs	(United States)	
17 Aug 1960	Noshaq	7492	Hindu Kush	(Afghanistan) (Pakistan)	Toshiaki Sakai & Goro Iwatsubo	(Japan)	
22 Sep 1960	Kuh-e Bandaka	6812	Hindu Kush	(Afghanistan)	Wolfgang von Hansemann, Dietrich Hasse, Siegbert Heine, and Johannes Winkler	(West Germany)	
13 Mar 1961	Ama Dablam	6856	Himalayas	(Nepal)	Mike Gill, Barry Bishop, Mike Ward, Wally Romanes	(New Zealand) (United Kingdom) (United States)	
16 May 1961	Nuptse	7861	Himalayas	(Nepal)	Tashi Sherpa and Dennis Davis	(Nepal) (United Kingdom)	
16 Sep 1961	Castleton Tower	2029	Utah	(United States)	Layton Kor and Huntley Ingalls	(United States)	
17 Jan 1962	Mount Fridtjof Nansen	4070	Transantarctic Mts	(Antarctica)	Vic R. McGregor, Peter M. Otway, Kevin P. Pain and Wally W. Herbert	(New Zealand) (United Kingdom)	
24 Jan 1962	Saltoro Kangri	7742	Karakoram	(India) (Pakistan)	Yasuo Takamura, Atsuo Saito, R.A. Bashir	(Japan) (Pakistan)	
13 Feb 1962	Puncak Jaya	4884	Maoke Mountains	(Indonesia)	Heinrich Harrer, Philip Temple, Russell Kippax and Albert Huizenga	(Australia) (Austria) (Netherlands) (New Zealand)	
28 Apr 1962	Jannu	7710	Himalayas	(Nepal)	René Desmaison, Paul Keller, Robert Paragot and Gyalzen Mitchung	(France) (Nepal)	
16 Jan 1963	Central Tower of Paine	2460	Patagonian Andes	(Chile)	Don Whillans and Chris Bonington	(United Kingdom)	
7 Jul 1963	El Altar	5319	Andes	(Ecuador)	Ferdinando Gaspard, Marino Tremonti, Claudio Zardini	(Italy)	
24 Jul 1963	Mount Chamberlin	2749	Brooks Range	(United States)	George G. Barnes, Dennis Burge, Graham Stephenson	(United States)	
1963	Khüiten Peak	4374	Altai Mountains	(Mongolia) (China)	Mongolian mountaineers	(Mongolia)	
29 Jan 1964	Lautaro	3623	Patagonia	(Chile)	Peter Skvarca and Luciano Pera	(Argentina)	
10 Apr 1964	Gyachung Kang	7952	Himalayas	(Nepal) (China)	Yukihiko Kato, Kiyoto Sakaizawa and Pasang Phutar Sherpa	(Japan) (Nepal)	
2 May 1964	Shishapangma	8013	Himalayas	(China)	Xu Jing, Wang Fuzhou, Zhāng Jùnyán, Wū Zōngyuè, Chén Sān, Soinam Dorjê, Chéng Tiānliàng, Migmar Zhaxi, Dorjê and Yún Dēng	(China)	
25 May 1964	Mount Huntington	3731	Alaska Range	(United States)	Jacques Batkin and Sylvain Sarthou	(France)	
1 Jun 1964	The Moose's Tooth	3150	Alaska Range	(United States)	Walter Welsch, Arnold Hasenkopf, Klaus Bierl, Alfons Reichegger	(West Germany)	
30 Dec 1964	Mount Paget	2935	South Georgia	(Antarctica)	S. H. Down, T. J. Lynch and J. R. Chester	(United Kingdom)	
14 Feb 1965	Ball's Pyramid	562	Lord Howe Island	(Australia)	Bryden Allen, John Davis, Jack Pettigrew and David Witham	(Australia)	
24 Mar 1965	Mount Kennedy	4238	Saint Elias Mts	(Canada)	Robert F. Kennedy, James Whittaker, Dee Molenaar, and others	(United States)	
20 Jul 1965	Mount Thor	1675	Baffin Mountains	(Canada)	Donald Morton and Lyman Spitzer	(Canada)	
29 Jul 1965	Mount Nirvana	2773	Mackenzie Mts	(Canada)	Bill Buckingham and Lew Surdam	(United States)	
1965	Pico da Neblina	2994	Guiana Highlands	(Brazil) (Venezuela)	Brazilian Army Team	(Brazil)	
18 Jul 1966	Old Man of Hoy	137	Orkney Islands	(United Kingdom)	Chris Bonington, Rusty Baillie and Tom Patey	(United Kingdom)	
18 Dec 1966	Mount Vinson	4897	Ellsworth Mts	(Antarctica)	Barry Corbet, John Evans, Bill Long, Pete Schoening	(United States)	
6 Jan 1967	Mount Tyree	4852	Ellsworth Mts	(Antarctica)	Barry Corbet and John Evans	(United States)	
5 Jun 1967	Barbeau Peak	2616	Arctic Cordillera	(Canada)	Geoffrey Hattersley-Smith	(United Kingdom)	
17 Jul 1970	K6/Baltistan Peak	7282	Karakoram	(Pakistan)	Eduard Koblmüller, Gerd Pressl, Gerhard Haberl, Christian von der Hecken	(Austria)	
19 Oct 1970	Ngadi Chuli	7871	Himalayas	(Nepal)	Hiroshi Watanabe and Lhakpa Tsering	(Japan) (Nepal)	
18 May 1971	Dhaulagiri II	7751	Himalayas	(Nepal)	Adolf Huber, Sherpa Jangbu, Adi Weissensteiner, Ronald Fear	(Austria) (Nepal)	
23 Aug 1971	Malubiting	7458	Karakoram	(Pakistan)	Horst Schindlbacher, Kurt Pirker, Hilmar Sturm, and Hanns Schell	(Austria)	
26 Aug 1971	Khunyang Chhish	7852	Karakoram	(Pakistan)	Andrzej Heinrich, Jan Stryczyński, Ryszard Szafirski, Andrzej Zawada	(Poland)	
14 May 1973	Yalung Kang	8505	Himalayas	(Nepal)	Yutaka Ageta Takao Matsuda	(Japan)	
5 Jun 1973	Saser Kangri I	7672	Karakoram	(India)	Dawa Norbu, Da Tenzing, Nima Tenzing, Thondup	(China) (India)	
13 Jan 1974	Cerro Torre	3128	Patagonia	(Argentina) (Chile)	Daniele Chiappa, Mario Conti, Casimiro Ferrari and Pino Negri	(Italy)	
26 May 1974	Kangbachen	7903	Himalayas	(Nepal)	Kazimierz Olech, Wiesław Kłaput, Marek Malatyński, Zbigniew Rubinowski, Wojciech Brański	(Poland)	
3 Jun 1974	Nilkantha	6596	Himalayas	(India)	Sonam Pulzor, Kanhiya Lal, Dilip Singh, Nima Dorje	(China) (India)	
3 Jun 1974	Shivling	6543	Himalayas	(India)	Hukam Singh, Laxman Singh, Ang Tharkey, Pemba Tharkey, Pasang Sherpa	(China) (India)	
4 Jun 1974	Changabang	6864	Himalayas	(India)	Tashi Chewang, Balwant Sandhu, Chris Bonington, Martin Boysen, Dougal Haston, Doug Scott	(India) (United Kingdom)	
21 Jul 1974	Shispare	7611	Karakoram	(Pakistan)	Hubert Bleicher, Leszek Cichy, Marek Grochowski, Jan Honlicki-Szulc, Andrzje Młynarczyk, Herbert Oberhofer and Jacek Poręba	(Poland) (West Germany)	
30 Aug 1974	K12	7428	Karakoram	(India) (Pakistan)	Shinichi Takagi, Tsutomu Ito	(Japan)	
2 Aug 1975	Chogolisa	7665	Karakoram	(Pakistan)	Fred Pressl and Gustav Ammerer	(Austria)	
11 Aug 1975	Gasherbrum III	7946	Karakoram	(China) (Pakistan)	Wanda Rutkiewicz, Alison Chadwick-Onyszkiewicz, Janusz Onyszkiewicz and Krzysztof Zdzitowiecki	(Poland)	
22 Feb 1976	Torre Egger	2685	Patagonia	(Argentina) (Chile)	John Bragg, Jim Donini and Jay Wilson	(United States)	
30 Jun 1976	Batura Sar	7795	Karakoram	(Pakistan)	Hubert Bleicher and Herbert Oberhofer	(West Germany)	
8 Jul 1976	Nameless Tower	6239	Karakoram	(Pakistan)	Joe Brown, Mo Anthoine, Martin Boysen, and Malcolm Howells	(United Kingdom)	
7 Aug 1976	Apsarasas Kangri	7245	Karakoram	(India)	Yoshio Inagaki, Katsuhisa Yabuta, and Takamasa Miyomoto	(Japan)	
13 Jul 1977	The Ogre	7285	Karakoram	(Pakistan)	Doug Scott and Chris Bonington	(United Kingdom)	
21 Jul 1977	Great Trango Tower	6286	Karakoram	(Pakistan)	Galen Rowell, John Roskelley, Kim Schmitz, Jim Morrissey and Dennis Hennek	(United States)	
24 Oct 1978	Langtang Lirung	7227	Himalayas	(Nepal)	Seishi Wada and Pemba Tsering	(Japan) (Nepal)	
8 May 1979	Gauri Sankar	7134	Himalayas	(Nepal) (China)	John Roskelley and Pertemba Dorje Sherpa	(Nepal) (United States)	
24 Jun 1979	Thalay Sagar	6904	Himalayas	(India)	Roy Kligfield, John Thackray, Pete Thexton	(United Kingdom) (United States)	
5 Jul 1979	Uli Biaho Tower	6109	Karakoram	(Pakistan)	John Roskelley, Kim Schmitz, Ron Kauk and Bill Forrest	(United States)	
19 Jul 1979	Latok	7145	Karakoram	(Pakistan)	Sin'e Matsumi, Tsuneo Shigehiro, Yu Watanabe	(Japan)	
2 Jun 1980	Mitre Peak	6010	Karakoram	(Pakistan)	Ivano Ghirardini	(France)	
16 Jul 1980	Chutine Peak	2910	Coast Mountains	(Canada)	Geoffrey Faraghan, Paul Tamm, Chris Wilson, Leslie Wilson	(United States)	
Jan 1981	The Spectre	2020	Transantarctic Mts	(Antarctica)	Edmund Stump and Mugs Stump	(United States)	
22 May 1981	Amne Machin	6282	Kunlun Mountains	(China)	Giichiro Watanabe, Yoshio Yamamoto and Katsumi Miyake	(Japan)	
12 Jul 1981	Kongur Tagh	7649	Kunlun Mountains	(China)	Chris Bonington, Al Rouse, Peter Boardman, Joe Tasker	(United Kingdom)	
7 Aug 1981	Bogda Feng	5445	Tian Shan	(China)	11 members of a team led by Ryohei Uchida	(Japan)	
3 Oct 1982	Changtse	7543	Himalayas	(China)	Johan Taks	(Netherlands)	
26 Jun 1984	Yukshin Gardan Sar	7530	Karakoram	(Pakistan)	Willi Bauer, Walter Bergmayr, Willi Brandecker, Reinhard Streif	(Austria)	
13 Sep 1984	Mamostong Kangri	7516	Karakoram	(India) (Pakistan)	Noboru Yamada, Kenji Yoshida, Rajiv Sharma, P.M. Das, H.S. Chauhan	(India) (Japan)	
2 May 1985	Mount Hesperus	2996	Alaska Range	(United States)	Justin Lesueur, Karl Swanson, Stephen Spalding	(New Zealand) (United States)	
26 May 1985	Gurla Mandhata	7694	Himalayas	(China)	Cirenuoji, Jiabu, Jin Junxi, Song Zhiyu, Yoshiharu Suita, Kozo Matsubayashi, Toyoji Wada and Kiichiro Suita	(China) (Japan)	
21 Apr 1986	Kula Kangri	7538	Himalayas	(Bhutan) (China)	C. Itani, J. Sakamoto, H. Ozaki, E. Ohtani	(Japan)	
30 Oct 1986	Gyala Peri	7294	Himalayas	(China)	Yasuhiro Hashimoto, Hirotaka Imamura, Yoshio Ogata	(Japan)	
8 May 1987	Shanzidou	5596	Mount Satseto	(China)	Phil Peralta-Ramos and Eric Perlman	(United States)	
20 Jul 1987	Polar Sun Spire	1500	Baffin Mountains	(Canada)	Peter Gobet and Xaver Bongard	(Switzerland)	
26 Oct 1987	Labuche Kang	7367	Himalayas	(China)	Ataru Deuchi, Hidekatsu Furukawa, Keiichi Sudo, Osamu Tanabe, Diaqiog, Gyala, Lhaji, Wanjia	(China) (Japan)	
18 Feb 1988	Mount Minto	4163	Admiralty Mts	(Antarctica)	Greg Mortimer, Lyle Closs, Glenn Singleman, Chris Hilton, Lincoln Hall, and Jonathan Chester	(Australia)	
28 Jul 1988	Rimo I	7385	Karakoram	(India) (Pakistan)	Nima Dorje Sherpa, Tsewang Smanla, Yoshio Ogata, Hideki Yoshida, SI Kanhaiya Lai and Rattan Singh	(India) (Japan)	
1 Sep 1988	Chakragil	6760	Kunlun Mountains	(China)	Misao Hirano, Minoru Hachisu, Kenji Nakayama	(Japan)	
11 Jan 1990	Mount Sidley	4285	Marie Byrd Land	(Antarctica)	Bill Atkinson	(New Zealand)	
19 Aug 1990	Xuelian Feng	6627	Tian Shan	(China)	Motochiro Fujita, Hideki Sakai, Mikio Suzuki, Etuo Nishikawa, Hiroshi Kojiri, Takuo Kato, Reiji Takahashi, Kazuo Tukushima	(Japan)	
7 Jan 1991	Mount Kirkpatrick	4528	Alexandra Range	(Antarctica)	David H. Elliot, Tom H. Fleming & C. A. Miller	(United States)	
23 Oct 1992	Menlungtse	7181	Himalayas	(China)	Marko Prezelj and Andrej Štremfelj	(Slovenia)	
30 Oct 1992	Namcha Barwa	7782	Himalayas	(China)	11 team members	(China) (Japan)	
22 Jul 1993	The Crown	7295	Karakoram	(China)	Kazuo Tokushima, Akito Yamasaki and Yasuyuki Aritomi	(Japan)	
2 Feb 1994	Ulvetanna Peak	2930	Queen Maud Land	(Antarctica)	Robert Caspersen, Sjur Nesheim and Ivar Tollefsen	(Norway)	
7 Aug 1994	Passu Sar	7476	Karakoram	(Pakistan)	Max Wallner, Dirk Naumann, Ralf Lehmann, Volker Wurnig	(Germany)	
1 Dec 1994	Mount Epperly	4512	Ellsworth Mts	(Antarctica)	Erhard Loretan	(Switzerland)	
23 Oct 1995	Nyegyi Kansang	7047	Himalayas	(India) (China)	Rattan Singh, Rajiv Shanna, Jagmohan Singh, Nadre Sherpa and Lopsang	(India)	
13 Jan 1996	Peak 4111	4111	Ellsworth Mts	(Antarctica)	Érik Decamp and Catherine Destivelle	(France)	
29 Jan 1996	Mount Foster	2105	South Shetland	(Antarctica)	Brice Dowrick, Greg Landreth, Dan Mannix and Roger Thompson	(Canada) (New Zealand)	
11 Jul 1996	Ultar Sar	7388	Karakoram	(Pakistan)	Akito Yamazaki & Kiyoshi Matsuoka	(Japan)	
15 Sep 1996	Hkakabo Razi	5881	Himalayas	(Myanmar)	Takashi Ozaki and Nyima Gyaltsen	(Myanmar) (Japan)	
3 Jan 1997	Rakekniven	2365	Queen Maud Land	(Antarctica)	Conrad Anker, Mike Graber, Jon Krakauer, Alex Lowe, Rick Ridgeway, Gordon Wiltsie	(United States)	
9 May 1999	Gangkhar Puensum N	7535	Himalayas	(Bhutan) (China)	Kiyohiko Suzuki and four others	(China) (Japan)	
22 Sep 2001	Meru C (Shark's Fin)	6310	Himalayas	(India)	Valery Babanov	(Russia)	
2 Oct 2002	Sepu Kangri	6956	Nyenchen Tanglha	(China)	Mark Newcomb and Carlos Buhler	(United States)	
7 Nov 2002	Num Ri	6677	Himalayas	(Nepal)	Olaf Rieck, Lydia Schubert and Carsten Schmidt	(Germany)	
15 Aug 2005	Tomort	4886	Tian Shan	(China)	Hiroyuki Katsuki and Koichiro Takahashi	(Japan)	
9 Dec 2006	Mount Rutford	4477	Ellsworth Mts	(Antarctica)	Jed Brown, Camilo Rada and Pachi Ibarra	(Chile) (United States)	
7 Jan 2007	Mount Anderson	4144	Ellsworth Mts	(Antarctica)	Jed Brown and Damien Gildea	(Australia) (United States)	
9 Jun 2009	Changuch	6322	Himalayas	(India)	Martin Moran, Rob Jarvis, Paul Guest, Luder Sain and Leon Winchester	(India) (United Kingdom)	
10 Jul 2009	Gasherbrum II East	7772	Karakoram	(China) (Pakistan)	Cedric Hählen, Hans Mitterer and Ueli Steck	(Germany) (Switzerland)	
24 Aug 2011	Saser Kangri II	7518	Karakoram	(India)	Mark Richey, Steve Swenson and Freddie Wilkinson	(United States)	
18 Jul 2013	Kunyang Chhish East	7430	Karakoram	(Pakistan)	Hansjörg Auer, Matthias Auer and Simon Anthamatten	(Austria) (Switzerland)	
7 Sep 2013	Gamlang Razi	5870	Himalayas	(Myanmar) (China)	Eric Daft, Mark Fisher, Chris Nance, Andy Tyson, Molly Loomis Tyson, and Pyae Phyo Aung	(Myanmar) (United States)	
25 Jul 2014	Gasherbrum V	7147	Karakorum	(Pakistan)	An Chi Young and Seong Nakjong	(South Korea)	
25 Oct 2018	Lunag Ri	6907	Himalayas	(Nepal) (China)	David Lama	(Austria)	
15 Jul 2023	Yermanendu Kangri	7163	Karakoram	(Pakistan)	Simon Messner and Martin Sieberer	(Austria)	
5 Jul 2024	Muchu Chhish	7453	Karakoram	(Pakistan)	Zdenek Hak, Radoslav Groh, and Jaroslav Bansky	(Czech Republic)	
13 Aug 2024	Karjiang I	7453	Himalayas	(China) (Bhutan)	Song Yuancheng, Liu Yang	(China)	

== See also ==
- List of first ascents in the Alps
- List of first ascents in the Sierra Nevada (U.S.)
- List of first ascents in the Cordillera Blanca
