= Fritz Wintersteller =

Austrian mountaineer (1927–2018)

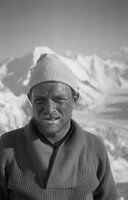

Personal information
- Born: 21 October 1927 Innsbruck, Tyrol, Austria
- Died: 15 September 2018 (aged 90)
- Occupation: Mountaineer

Climbing career
- First ascents: Broad Peak; Skil Brum
- Known for: Broad Peak first ascent

Fritz Wintersteller (21 October 1927 – 15 September 2018) was an Austrian climber who made the first ascent of Broad Peak together with Hermann Buhl, Kurt Diemberger, and Marcus Schmuck in 1957.

Although never a professional climber, he climbed almost every 4000m-mountain in the Alps, including first ascents of Hochkogel (north face) and Wiesspitze. Three other side summits over 4000m were apparently considered by him to be "not beautiful enough" to climb.

In his later years, he made several trips to Alaska for long ski tours and rafting several rivers. As of 2010 he was living in Salzburg, Austria. Due to difficulties with his hips he spent most of his time bicycling.

== First ascents ==
Data from

- 1943
  - Kleines Fieberhorn, Southeast tower, variant V
  - Grosses Fieberhorn, South traverse, V−
  - Bratschenkopf, direct South face, V
- 1944
  - Zahringkogel, direct West face, V+
  - Watzmannfrau, Northwest, left traverse, V+
- 1945
  - Hochkogel, Northwest face tower, V
- 1946
  - Grosswand, South ridge, 1. descent on skis
- 1948
  - Wiesspitze, direct West face, V+
  - Lehender Kopf, direct West face, V
- 1955
  - Falkenstein, Southeast ridge, III
  - Westbyfijell, South face, III and Southeast ridge, II
  - Snökuppelen, North face, IV
- 1957
  - Broad Peak 8030m, Forepeak on May 29
  - Broad Peak 8047m on June 9
  - Skil Brum 7420m on June 19

== See also ==
- List of famous Austrians
- List of Austrian mountaineers
- Eight-thousander
- Broad Peak
- Skil Brum
- Alpine style
- List of first ascents
