= List of Austrian mountain climbers =

This is a list of Austrian mountaineers. On 5 of the 14 Eight-thousanders Austrian have made the first ascent, more than any other nation can claim. Out of the total of 9 Austrian mountaineers who made first ascents of Eight-thousanders, 3 have been members of the Edelweiss Club Salzburg, an association of mountaineers founded in Salzburg in 1881

Eight-thousanders Austrian First Ascent

- Hermann Buhl (1924–1957), first ascent solo and without oxygen of Nanga Parbat (1953) on the 1953 German–Austrian Nanga Parbat expedition, first ascent of Broad Peak (1957)
- Kurt Diemberger (born 1932), first ascents of Broad Peak (1957) and Dhaulagiri (1960)
- Fritz Moravec (1922–1997), first ascent of Gasherbrum II together with Josef Larch and Hans Willenpart
- Marcus Schmuck (1925–2005), first ascent of Broad Peak (1957), initiator and leader of the OEAV Karakoram Expedition
- Herbert Tichy (1912–1987), geologist, writer and mountaineer (first ascent of Cho Oyu, together with Sepp Jöchler)
- Fritz Wintersteller (1927–2018), first ascent of Broad Peak (1957)

Other Austrian mountaineers

- Hansjörg Auer(1984–2019) Marmolada "Way of the Fish" free solo, Lupghar Sar West in the Karakoram-solo, Howse Peak with David Lama and Jess Roskelley
- Peter Aufschnaiter (1899–1973), mountaineer and co-traveller of Heinrich Harrer (Seven Years in Tibet)
- Karl Blodig (1859–1956), mountaineer (first to climb all alpine mountains above 4000m)
- Ulrike Gschwandtner (1965–2007), social scientist and climber, died at Gasherbrum II
- Paul Grohmann (1838–1908), first ascent of the four highest Dolomites
- Peter Habeler (born 1942), first ascent of Mount Everest without oxygen (together with Reinhold Messner)
- Heinrich Harrer (1912–2006), mountaineer (first ascent of the Carstensz Pyramid and the Eiger north face) and writer (Seven Years in Tibet)
- Conrad Kain (1883–1934), first ascent of Mount Robson
- Gerlinde Kaltenbrunner (born 1970), first woman to ascend all Eight-thousanders without supplementary oxygen (2011)
- Fritz Kasparek (1910–1954), many first ascents, including the Eiger north face
- Markus Kronthaler (1967–2006), Tyrolean mountaineer, ice climber
- Moriz von Kuffner(1854–1939) first descent of the Mittellegi Ridge on the Eiger & first ascent of the Arête Kuffner of Mont Maudit
- David Lama (1990–2019) Cerro Torre free climb of the compressor route, Lunag Ri solo climb, Howse Peak climbed but party lost in descent
- Paul Preuss (1886–1913), premier rock climber of his time
- Ludwig Purtscheller (1849–1900), first ascent of Kilimanjaro in 1889
- Christian Stangl (born 1966), speed climber

== See also ==
- Mountaineering
- List of climbers
- List of Austrians
