= C. R. Cooke =

- Born: 31 August 1901; Mussoorie, India
- Died: 27 December 1996 (aged 95); Maidstone, Kent, England
- Military career
- Service years: 1940 – 1946
- Rank: Lieutenant Colonel
- Awards: OBE

Lieutenant-Colonel Conrad Reginald Cooke, OBE (31 August 1901 – 27 December 1996) was an English early Himalayan mountaineer. In 1935, alone and without oxygen, he reached the summit of Kabru North. His achievement remained the highest solo climb until 1953.

He was born in Mussoorie, India, where his father was an engineer with the Bombay, Baroda and Central India Railway. His mother was sister to Geoffrey Rothe Clarke.

Cooke obtained an engineering diploma at City & Guilds of London Institute in 1922. He joined the Indian Post and Telegraphs in 1925, serving as a divisional engineer and then as a director and superintendent of Telegraph Workshops, Alipore. He built and ran the first amateur radio in India and later designed, built and installed the first short-wave wireless link between India and Burma.

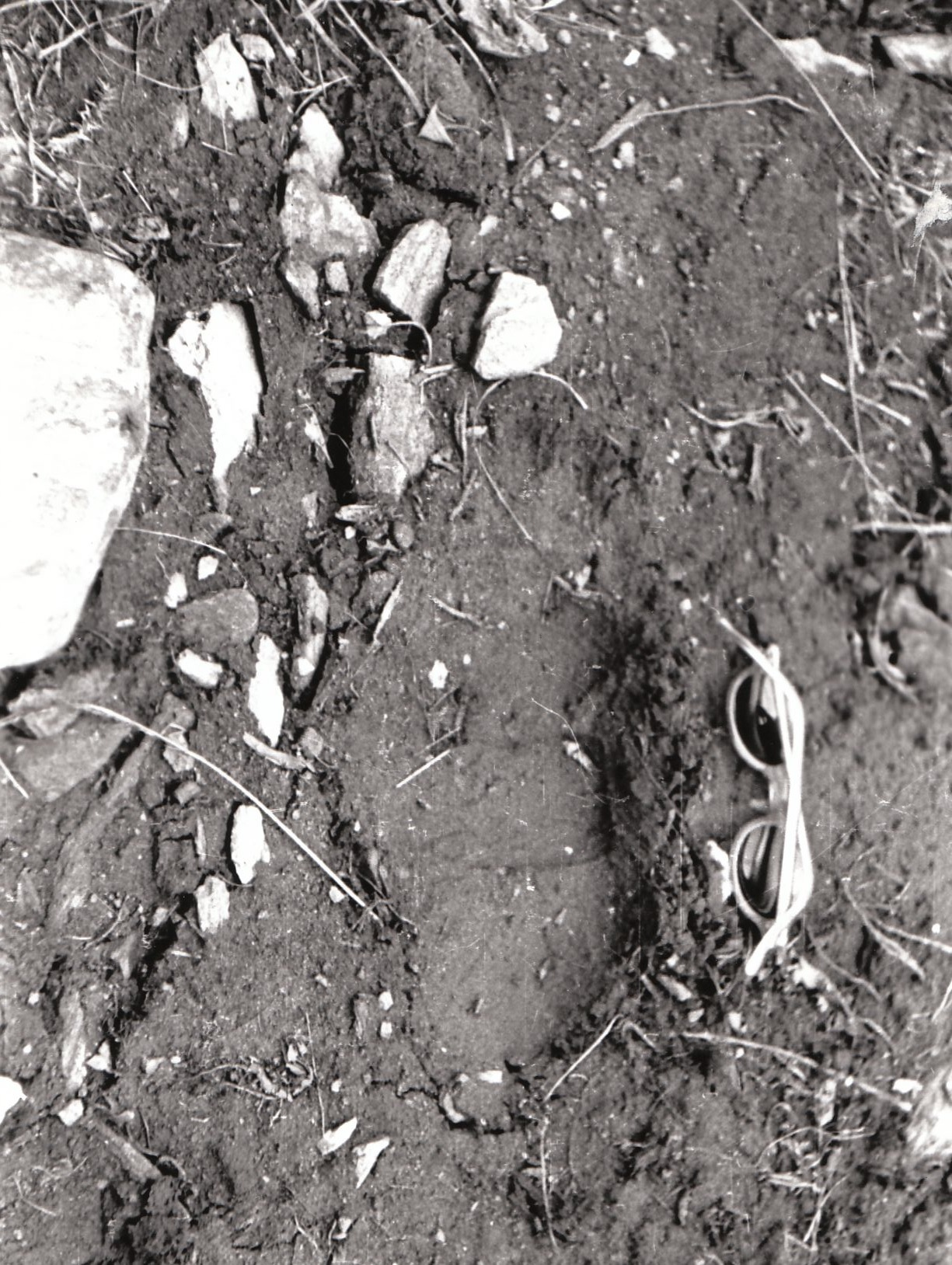
Purported Yeti footprint taken by C.R. Cooke in June 1944

In 1927 he made the second ascent of Kolahoi Peak (known as the “Kashmir Matterhorn”) by the East Ridge.

On 18 November 1935, he reached the summit of Kabru North without oxygen, after his Swiss companion Gustav Schoberth succumbed to altitude sickness at their highest camp.

He was selected to lead a post-monsoon expedition to ascend Mount Everest in late 1940, but plans were shelved by the outbreak of World War II.

In June 1944, with his wife Maragaret and a group of porters, he encountered very large bipedal prints in soft mud at 14,000 ft just below the Singalila Ridge commonly interpreted as bear-made, which the porters said were of the "Jungli Admi" (wild man) and which he implied were of the yeti. The creature had come up through bushes on the steep hillside from Nepal and crossed the track before continuing up to the ridge. Cooke wrote "We laid Maragaret's sunglasses beside each print to indicate its size and took photographs. These prints were strange and larger than any normal human foot, 14 inches heel to toe, with the great toe set back to one side, a first toe, also large, and three little toes closely bunched together."

He was a founder member of the Mountain Club of India, which later evolved into the Himalayan Club. He became its vice- president and served on the committee for the selection of the team for the successful 1953 assault on Mount Everest.

He was a keen naturalist, and from his tours he sent various beetle specimens to Britain, one of which Chlaenius cookei was named after him.

In June 1944 while Director of Line Construction, Posts and Telegraphs, New Delhi, he was appointed an Officer of the Order of the British Empire.

He was emergency commissioned into the Indian Army on 13 December 1940 and was released as a Major with the honorary rank of Lieutenant-Colonel on 30 November 1946.

At the partition of India, he joined the Pakistan Government as Chief Engineer Post and Telegraphs.

In 1948, he returned to Britain and started Westcliff Engineering in Stanstead Abbots. Hertfordshire, which among many other things made and supplied, to his own original design, the high altitude cookers which were used in the first successful ascent of Mount Everest in 1953.

In retirement he concentrated on miniature portrait painting and silversmithing, in both of which he exhibited. His autobiography Dust and Snow: Half a lifetime in India was published in 1988.
