= Yermanendu Kangri =

Peak in the Gilgit-Baltistan Region

- Location within Kashmir

Highest point
- Elevation: 7,163 m (23,501 ft)
- Prominence: 163 m (535 ft)
- Coordinates: 35°38′07″N 76°19′37″E

Geography
- Location: Pakistan
- Region: Gilgit-Baltistan
- Parent range: Karakoram

Climbing
- First ascent: July 15, 2023 by Simon Messner and Martin Sieberer
- Easiest route: Rock/snow/ice climb

Yermanendu Kangri is a mountain in the Masherbrum Mountains in the Karakoram. It is located just over 1 km east of Masherbrum. It is 7,163 m (23,501 ft) above sea level and has a prominence height of 163 m (535 ft). Due to the low prominence, it is often considered a sub-peak of Masherbrum.

== Climbing history ==
In 1981, Volker Stallbohm and Abdul Karim, during an attempt to climb the Masherbrum, reached the pass at 6,800 m (22,300 ft) between the Masherbrum and the Yermanendu Kangri, but could not find a route to the mountain.

It was first climbed in 2023 when Simon Messner and Martin Sieberer reached the summit on July 15, 2023. They faced bad weather and limited acclimatization on their attempt.

== See also ==
- Mandu Kangri
