= Ulrich Kaufmann =

Swiss mountain guide

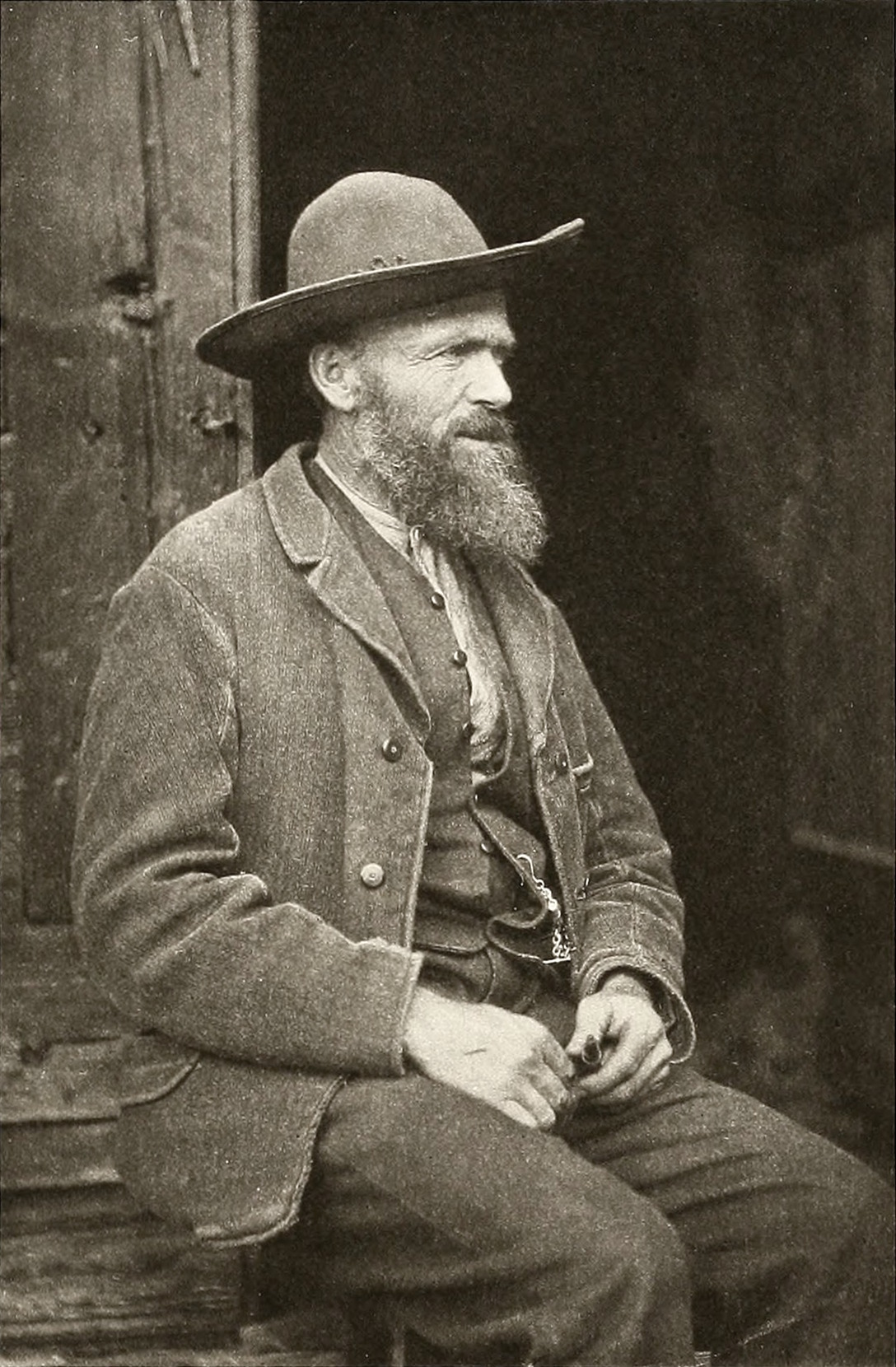

Personal information
- Nationality: Swiss
- Born: 31 May 1840; Grindelwald
- Died: 25 March 1917 (aged 76); Grindelwald

Ulrich Kaufmann (31 May 1840 – 25 March 1917) was a Swiss mountain guide. He was born and died in Grindelwald.

He was among the first Westerners to visit the mountain ranges of New Zealand and the Himalayas.

== Biography ==
In August 1857, Kaufmann participated in the first ascent of the Mönch. In July 1856, the Viennese physician Sigmund Porges had climbed the Jungfrau with the Grindelwald guide Christian Almer. The next year he came back to attempt a first ascent of the notorious Eiger. Christian Almer was Ulrich Kaufmann's brother-in-law, possibly explaining how Porges included the 17-year-old Kaufmann as one of his guides, along with Almer and Christian Kaufmann Sr. They took off on 13 August but conditions were poor. The attempt on Eiger faltered the next day, and the party turned its attention to the neighbouring Mönch. They had another bivouac an hour below the Mönchjoch (pass) and finally summited Mönch at 3 pm on 15 August, after Kaufmann and his fellow guides had cut 300 steps in ice. The next year, Porges performed the second ascent of Eiger with different guides.

In 1882, Kaufmann undertook the first attempted ascent of Aoraki / Mount Cook with William Spotswood Green (an Irish priest, marine biologist and member of the Alpine Club), and Emil Boss (an alpinist and hotelier who was also from Grindelwald). On 2 March 1882, they failed just 60 metres (200 ft) short of the summit because of a storm. The first complete ascent of Aoraki would not take place until nearly 13 years later.

In 1883, he and Emil Boss took part in the first climbing expedition in the Himalayas, led by William Woodman Graham. Among others, they claimed a near ascent of Dunagiri (reaching about 6,900 m) and an ascent of Changabang (6,864 m, 22,520 ft) in July in the Garhwal Himalaya. These claims are widely disputed and were probably based on poor maps and a misunderstanding of their location. However, their ascent to 30 feet below the east summit of Kabru 7,338 metres (24,075 ft) south of Kangchenjunga in October of that year is now considered quite likely. Before this time, no one is known to have reached over 6,785 metres (22,260 ft), though it is possible that Incas reached the summit of Aconcagua (6,962 m, 22,841 ft) in Pre-Columbian times. Kaufmann, Boss and Graham therefore likely broke the world altitude record in mountaineering by 350 m or 550 m and held this record for 26 years, until the Duke of the Abruzzi's expedition to the Karakoram in 1909 reached an altitude of ca. 7,500 metres (24,606 ft).

== Other first ascents ==
- 1861 – First ascent of the Schreckhorn with Peter Michel, Leslie Stephen and Christian Michel, by the south face, on 16 August
- 1862 – First ascent of the Grosses Fiescherhorn with Adolphus Warburton Moore, H. B. George and Christian Almer, on 23 July

== Sources ==
- Bordes, Gérard (1976). Grande Encyclopédie de la Montagne (in French). Vol. 6. Paris: Éditions Atlas.
- Cunningham, C. D.; de Wiveleslie Abney, Sir William (1888). The pioneers of the Alps. Estes and Lauriat. pp. 96-97.
- "Ulrich Kaufmann". Dictionnaire Historique de la Suisse (in French). 2007.
