= Marcus Schmuck =

20th-century Austrian mountaineer

Personal information
- Nationality: Austrian
- Born: 18 April 1925 Maria Alm, Austria
- Died: 21 August 2005 (aged 80) Salzburg, Austria

Marcus Schmuck (18 April 1925 – 21 August 2005) was an Austrian mountaineer. In 1957, together with Hermann Buhl he organized the expedition, firstly envisaged and initiated by Buhl, to climb the world's 12th highest peak, the Broad Peak (8,047 metres) in the Karakoram in Pakistan. The other members of the expedition were: Fritz Wintersteller and Kurt Diemberger. In his later years, he successfully organized and led 74 expeditions to the high mountains around the world.

== First ascents ==
- 1946 Nördlicher Mandlkopf, Southwest face, V
- 1948 Wildalmkirchl, South traverse, V+
- 1949 Fleischbank, direct East chimney ("Schmuckkamin"), VI
- Sommerstein, West face, 1. winter ascent
- 1953 Birnhorn, South face, 1. winter ascent
- 1955 Snökuppelen, North face, IV
- Falkenstein, Southeast ridge, III
- Westbyfijell, South face, III and Southeast ridge, II
- 1956 Petit Dru, West face, record time 1.5 days
- Bischofsmütze direct North face, VI+
- 1957 Broad Peak 8047m on 9 June
- Skil Brum 7420m on 19 June
- 1959 Hoggar Denachnet 2690m, East ridge
- 1963 Koh i Sayoz 6920m
- Koh i Shogordok 6855m
- 1965 Darban Zom 7220m
- Wildalmkirchl, South traverse
- 1982 Muztagh Ata 7546m, 3rd ascent, new route

=== Books ===
Marcus Schmuck wrote the following book:

- Broad Peak 8047m Meine Bergfahrten mit Hermann Buhl, 1958. German published by Verlag "Das Bergland-buch" in Salzburg/Stuttgart.

== See also ==
- List of Austrian mountain climbers
