= Kabru =

Mountain of the Himalayas

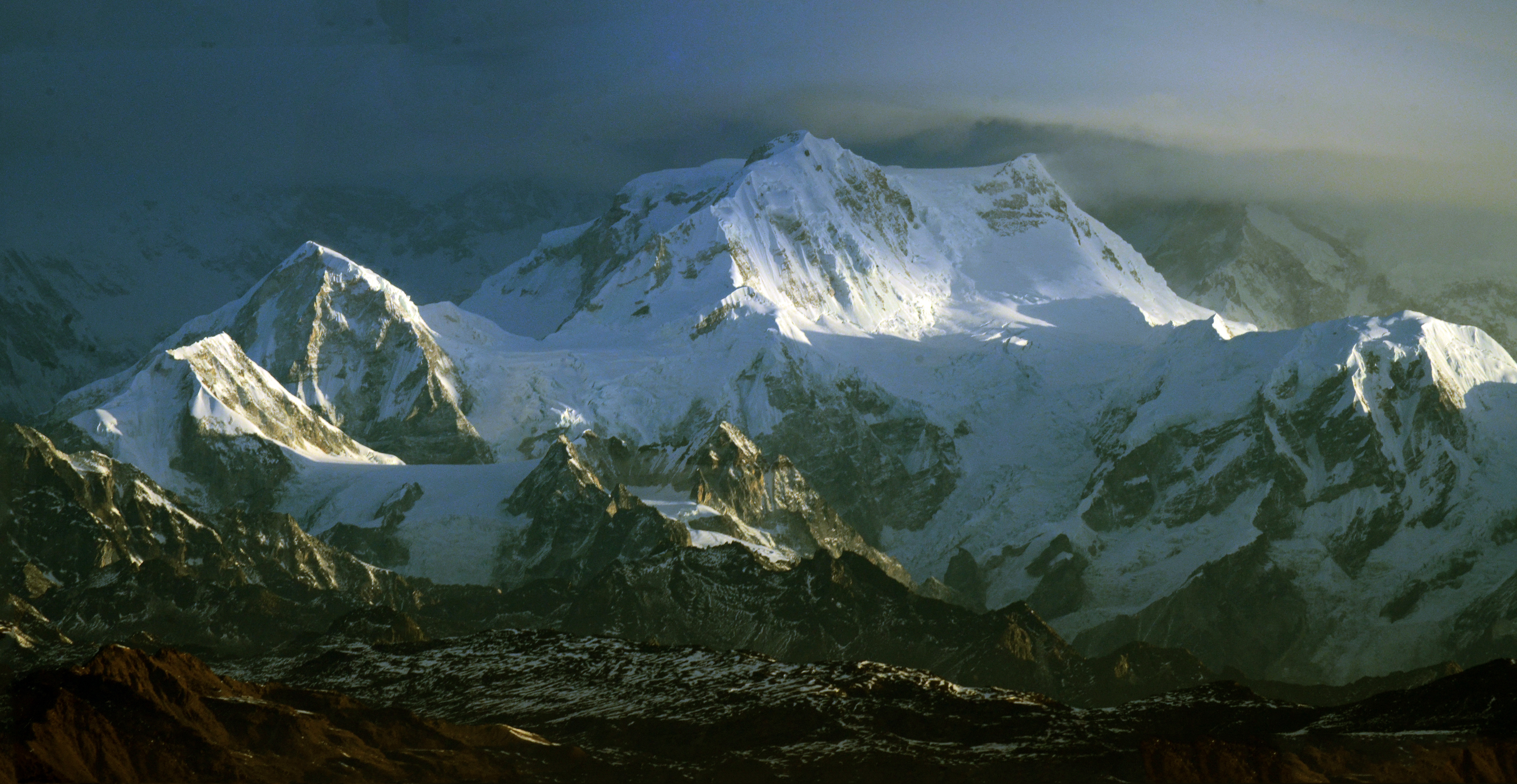
- Kabru, from Sandakphu at the border between Nepal and West Bengal, India

Highest point
- Elevation: 7,412 m (24,318 ft); Ranked 65th
- Prominence: 780 m (2,560 ft)
- Listing: Mountains of India; Mountains of Nepal
- Coordinates: 27°38′06″N 88°07′06″E

Geography
- Location within Koshi Province Location within Nepal Location within India
- Location: India–Nepal border
- Parent range: Himalayas

Kabru is a mountain in the Himalayas on the border of eastern Nepal and India. It is part of a ridge that extends south from the third highest mountain in the world, Kangchenjunga, and is the southernmost 7,000 metres (23,000 ft) peak in the world.

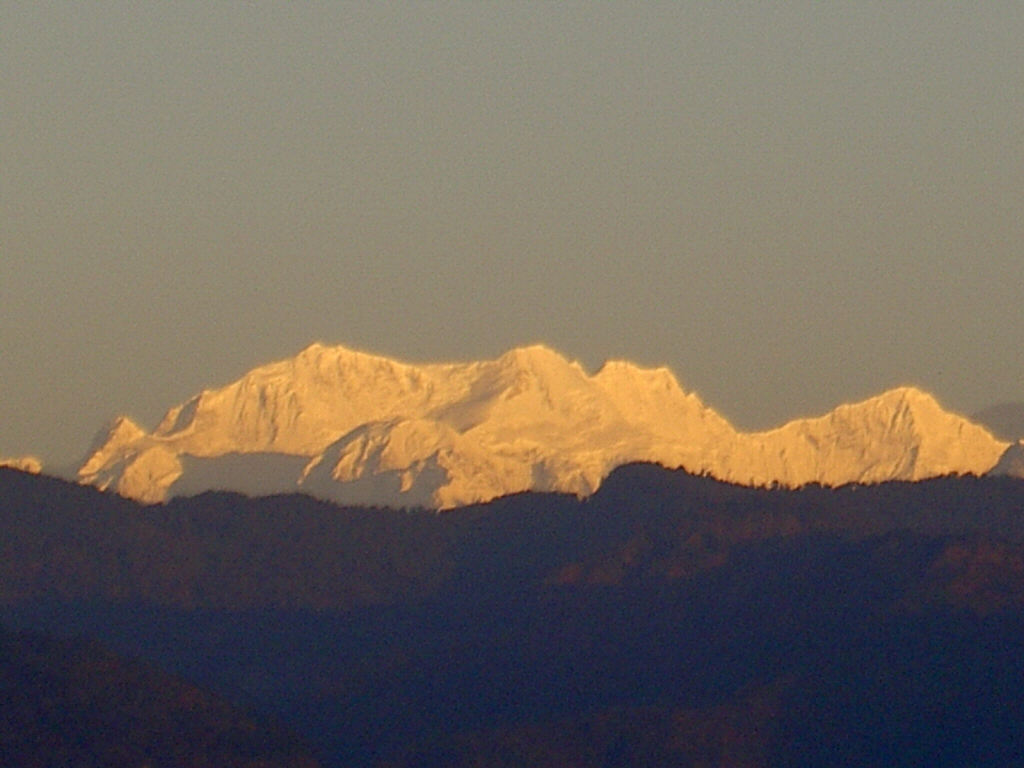
Kabru complex from the southeast (Kalimpong). From right to left: p.7349m, p.7412m, p.7338m, p.7318m.

The main features of this ridge are as follows (north to south):

- Kangchenjunga South top, 8476 m, at 27°41′30″N 88°09′15″E
- A 6600–6700 m saddle, located at 27°39′51″N 88°09′39″E
- A 7349 m summit, known as Talung, at 27°39′18″N 88°07′51″E
- A 6983 m saddle, at 27°38′51″N 88°07′21″E
- A 7412 m summit, at 27°38′06″N 88°07′06″E. This point has sufficient prominence to be classified as the highest point of a separate mountain, according to the definition used in List of highest mountains. It is confusingly referred to by some authorities as "Kabru IV", but it is not clear that this is correct, or that any "Kabru" name is correctly applied to this summit.
- A substantial "field of firn" measuring about 2 km from north to south, and 1 km from east to west. This is almost entirely over 7200 m, and the watershed divide that runs through this field does not drop below this height.
- A 7338 m summit, at ca. 27°37′09″N 88°07′28″E, at the eastern boundary of the field of firn. This point is known as Kabru North. Although it is lower than the 7412 m summit, it has been at times considered to be Kabru's highest point, with the higher summit considered to be an unnamed summit along the ridge to Kangchenjunga.
- An intervening c.7200 m saddle
- A 7318 m summit, at 27°36′30″N 88°06′42″E, known as Kabru South is the southernmost "7000 m peak" in the world.

To the south west of Kabru south, there is a 6400 m saddle and a 6682 m summit known as Rathong. To its south east is the 6600 m Kabru Dome.

== Mountaineering ==
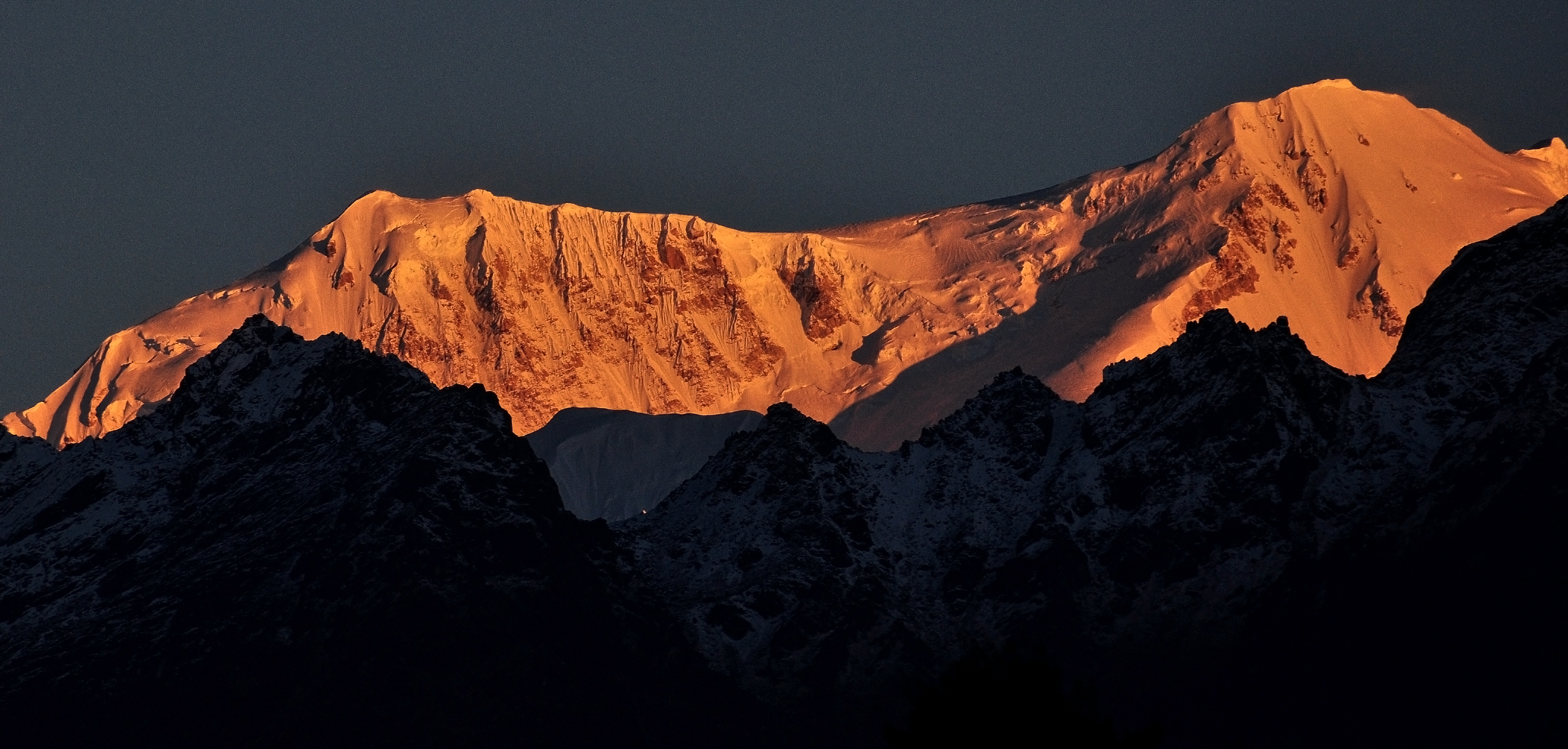
Mt. Kabru at sunrise, Sikkim (2013).

The 7338 m summit of Kabru is the site of a mountaineering altitude record, either in 1883 or in 1905. The English barrister William Graham, the Swiss hotelier Emil Boss and the Swiss mountain guide Ulrich Kaufmann reported to have reached a point 30-40 feet below this summit, which Graham described as "little more than a pillar of ice", at 2pm on October 8, 1883. The ascent was questioned by powerful members of the Alpine Club and the Indian Survey Department, though not by their Himalayan climbing colleagues, and has been dismissed for most of the time since. Recent analysis suggests that the mountaineers may have been correct in their assertions after all. If Graham, Boss and Kaufmann did climb to ~7325 m on Kabru it was a remarkable achievement for its time, breaking the existing altitude record by at least 360 m (assuming a pre-Columbian ascent of Aconcagua) and holding it for twenty-six years (when in 1909 an expedition led by Luigi Amedeo, Duke of the Abruzzi reached about 7500 m on Chogolisa).

The same peak nevertheless became the site of an undisputed altitude record on 20 October 1907, when the Norwegians Carl W. Rubenson and Monrad Aas came within 50 m of climbing it. Notably, Rubenson and Aas believed that Kauffmann, Boss and Graham had reached the same point 24 years before.

The summit of this peak, Kabru North, was first reached by C. R. Cooke on 18 November 1935, without oxygen, after his Swiss companion Gustav Schoberth succumbed to altitude sickness at their highest camp. It remained the highest solo climb until 1953.

Talung (7349) was first climbed on May 18, 1964, by Franz Lindner and Tensing Nindra of a German expedition via the West Flank and South Col. Their original plan to climb the high point of Kabru (p.7412) from the 6983 m col had to be abandoned.

On May 10, 1994, 12 members of a large Indian Army expedition led by Major A. Abbey reached the summit of Kabru North (p. 7338). Four more climbers would reach this summit on May 13. From the saddle in between, a total of 27 soldiers made the first ascent of Kabru South (p. 7318) on May 12 and 13. This expedition also accomplished a first ascent of the highest summit of Kabru (p. 7412), which they called Kabru III and at that time was estimated to be 7395 m high. Three members led by Naib Subedar Dan Singh reached the peak on May 12, while a group of four led by Naib Subedar Devi Singh, climbed it on May 13, completing their ascent of all three summits.

In 2004, a group of Serbian climbers unsuccessfully attempted to climb the west face of Kabru South. A series of avalanches forced the group to give up their goal.

The north-northwest pillar of Talung was first climbed in 2015 by two Ukrainian climbers, Mikhail Fomin and Nikita Balabanov, who won the Piolets d'Or for their climb. It was the fifth ascent of Talung.
