= Hermann Buhl =

Austrian mountaineer (1924–1957)

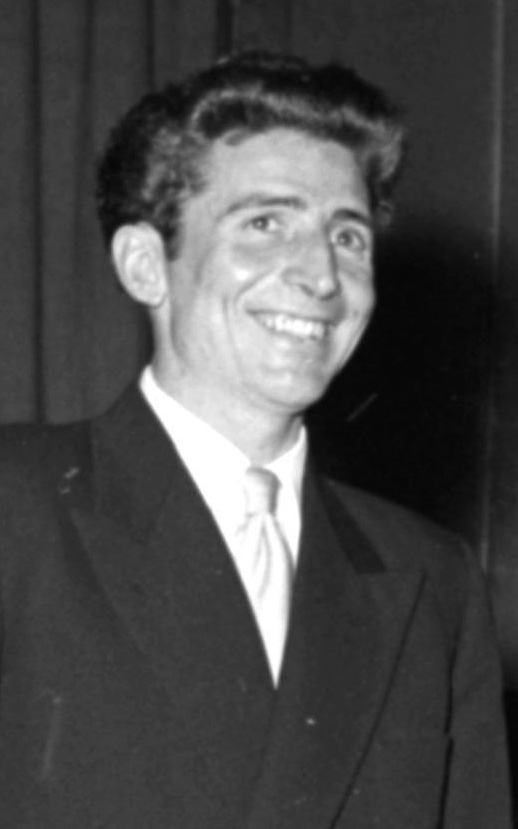
- Buhl in 1953, back from his ascent to Nanga Parbat

Personal information
- Nationality: Austrian
- Born: 21 September 1924 Innsbruck, Tyrol, Austria
- Died: 27 June 1957 (aged 32) Chogolisa, Pakistan
- Occupation: Mountaineer
- Spouse: Eugenie Högerle (m. 1951)
- Children: 3, including Kriemhild Buhl

Climbing career
- First ascents: Nanga Parbat; Broad Peak
- Known for: 1953 German–Austrian Nanga Parbat expedition

Hermann Buhl (21 September 1924 – 27 June 1957) was an Austrian mountaineer. His accomplishments include the first ascents of Nanga Parbat in 1953 and Broad Peak in 1957. He was one of the pioneers of the alpine style. Buhl was the father of Austrian–German writer, publisher, and freelance journalist, Kriemhild "Krimi" Buhl.

== Personal life ==
Buhl was born in Innsbruck, Austria. He was the youngest of four children. At the age of four, he was taken to an orphanage with his half-brother Siegfried after his mother Marianne, who came from South Tyrol, became mentally ill and was institutionalized. His father Wilhelm, unable to cope with raising four children alone, told them their mother had died. However, Marianne was later murdered by the Nazis at Mauthausen. He was later taken in by his aunt and uncle. In the 1930s, considered a weak and sensitive boy, he made his first climbing trips in the Tux Alps, the Wilder Kaiser, and the Karwendel. In 1939, he joined the youth group of the Innsbruck section, which belonged to the German Alpine Club (DAV) from 1938 to 1945. Later, together with his friend Kurt Diemberger, he was a member of the Bergland section of the DAV in Munich. With Luis Trenker's help, the section's founder, August Schuster, gave him a job in his sports shop.

After finishing secondary school, Buhl began an apprenticeship as a forwarding agent. World War II interrupted his commercial training, and in 1943 he joined the Alpine troops as a mountain infantryman. Buhl participated in the Battle of Monte Cassino in Italy. In 1949 he was a founding member of the Innsbruck mountain rescue group.

In March 1951, Buhl married Eugenie ("Generl") Högerle (died 2025) from Ramsau near Berchtesgaden and in the same year became the father of Kriemhild Buhl, who would later become a writer. Two more daughters, Silvia and Ingrid, who died young, followed, and the family moved to his wife's hometown.

In 1957, Hermann Buhl was photographed with his wife and daughter in Vienna before departing for the Broad Peak expedition. Less is known about Buhl's other daughters. In her book Papa Lalalaya, Kriemhild Buhl recounts her father's fame after the Nanga Parbat ascent and its effect on the family; she and her two younger sisters saw little of their father in his later years, as his mountaineering career and public engagements frequently kept him away from home.

As a mountain guide he earned little, so to support his family he also worked as a salesman and equipment advisor at Sporthaus Schuster, a sportswear store in Munich.

== Alpinism ==
=== Nanga Parbat ===
Before his successful 1953 Nanga Parbat expedition, 31 people had died trying to make the first ascent.

The ascent of Nanga Parbat on 3 July 1953 is Buhl's best-known achievement. It took place as part of the Willy Merkl Memorial Expedition, organized and led by the Munich doctor Karl Herrligkoffer, with Peter Aschenbrenner serving as alpine adviser. A change in the weather after an initial monsoon helped Buhl's group. On 2 July they reached Camp V at 6,900 m (22,638 ft): Buhl, Walter Frauenberger, Hans Ertl, and Otto Kempter. Buhl and Kempter spent the night there, while the other two descended with the porters to Camp IV.

Buhl set off for the summit alone and without additional oxygen at around 02:30, finally reaching it with his last reserves of strength at around 19:00. As proof of his ascent, he left his ice axe and the Pakistani flag at the summit. Kempter, who had set off an hour later, was forced to turn back after a bout of weakness at an altitude of around 7,400 m (24,278 ft) on the plateau at the Silbersattel. He returned to Camp V, where he waited with Frauenberger and Ertl, who had climbed back up, for Buhl to return.

Buhl spent the following night alone, about 1.2 km (4,000 feet) higher up than Camp V. He survived the night at an altitude of almost 8,000 m (26,200 ft) without bivouac equipment only because of unusually favourable weather. However, he suffered frostbite on two of his toes and still had most of the descent ahead of him. At times he fell into a dangerous state of apathy and suffered perceptual illusions, which he combated with Pervitin.

After 41 hours and in states of extreme exhaustion and dehydration, Buhl arrived back at Camp V, where hopes of his return had already begun to fade. In the days that followed, he also completed the descent to the main camp unaided, arriving there on 7 July. Here it turned out that the big toe and part of the second toe on his right foot could not be saved and had to be amputated. He therefore had to be carried on the rest of the return march. Hans Ertl made a documentary film called Nanga Parbat about this expedition.

A dispute arose between Herrligkoffer and Buhl after the expedition due to Herrligkoffer's authoritarian leadership and Buhl's refusal to follow orders without question. Expedition members had contractually ceded sole exploitation rights over the expedition's results to Herrligkoffer, and his rigorous enforcement of this clause led to a protracted legal dispute with Buhl and Hans Ertl.

Buhl is the only mountaineer to have made the first ascent of an eight-thousander solo, achieved on his first visit to the Greater Ranges. His monumental efforts, which included spending the night standing untethered on a tiny pedestal, too small to crouch on, at the edge of a 60-degree ice slope, have become mountaineering legend, described by Bonington as "a magnificent achievement".

In 1999, Buhl's ice axe, which had been left behind on the summit, was found by a Japanese expedition and returned to his widow.

=== Broad Peak ===
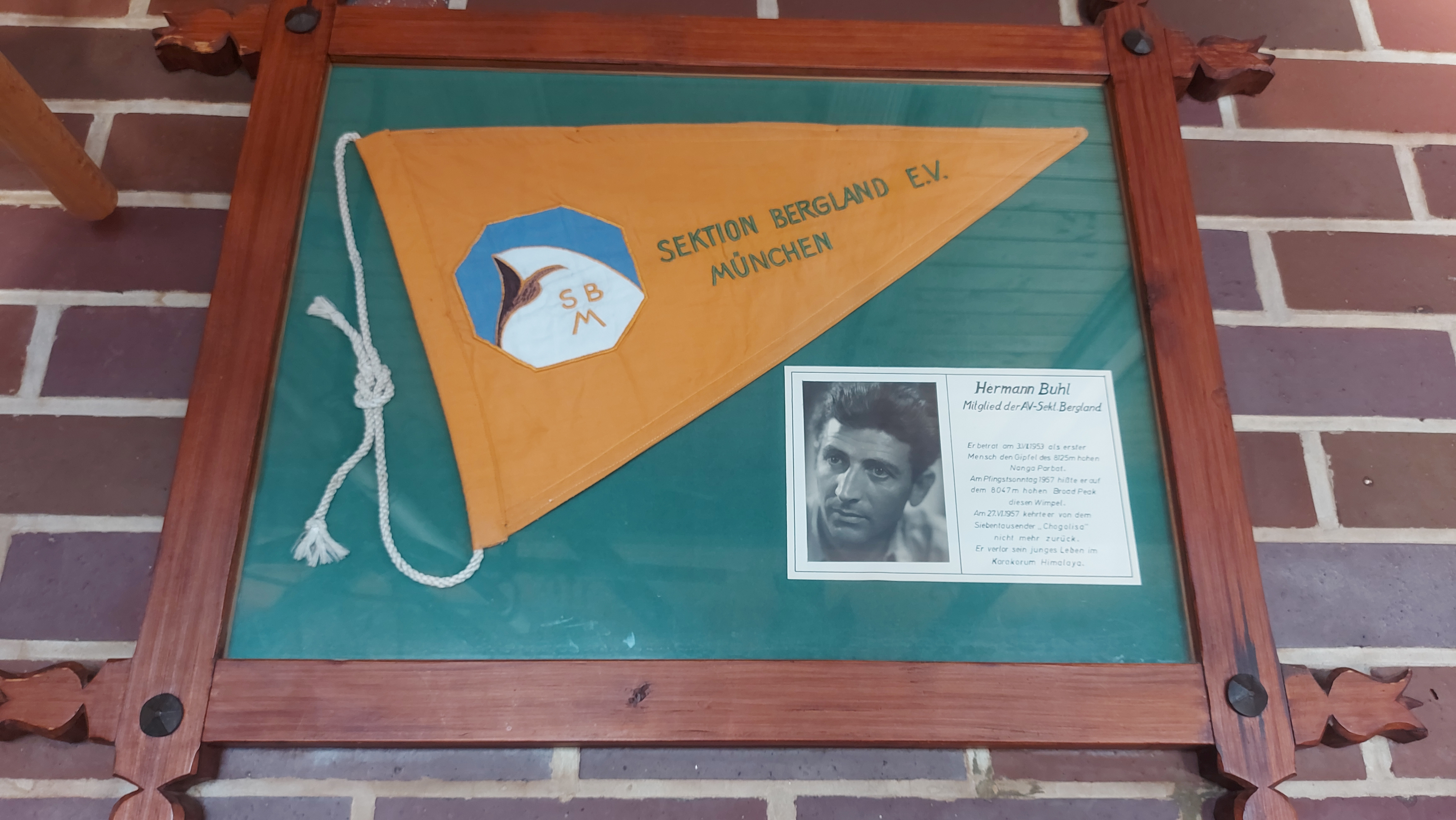
Hermann Buhl memorial plaque in the August-Schuster-Haus with original pennant

Fritz Wintersteller and Kurt Diemberger reached the forepeak (8,030 m (26,345 ft)) on 29 May 1957, during the course of the Austrian expedition led by Marcus Schmuck. However, it was a few days later, between 8 and 9 June, that Wintersteller, Schmuck, Diemberger, and Buhl reached the true summit of Broad Peak (8,051 m (26,414 ft)) and achieved the first successful ascent of the mountain. Buhl approached the summit in the twilight, at around 18:30. The ascent was accomplished without the aid of supplemental oxygen, high-altitude porters or base camp support. The original pennant bearing the Bergland section's emblem, which appears in Buhl's summit photo, is on display in the restaurant of the August-Schuster-Haus in Garmisch-Partenkirchen. This summit photo and Buhl's last letter to his comrades from Bergland can be found in the commemorative publication for the 50th anniversary of the Bergland section in 1958.

=== Chogolisa ===
Just a few weeks after the successful first ascent of Broad Peak, Buhl and Diemberger made an attempt on nearby, unclimbed Chogolisa (7,665 m (25,148 ft)) in Alpine style. Buhl lost his way in an unexpected snowstorm on the southeast ridge, near the summit of Chogolisa II (7,654 m (25,112 ft); also known as Bride Peak), and walked over a huge cornice overhanging the mountain's north face, subsequently triggering an avalanche that hurled him down the face. His body could not be recovered and remains in the ice. After losing sight of Buhl in the storm, Diemberger, who was climbing with him, found his footsteps leading to a fresh breach in the cornice.

== Legacy ==
Buhl was the first person to climb an eight-thousander on the final section alone and without additional oxygen. Austrian sports journalists voted him "Sportsman of the Year 1953" on 21 January 1954.

Because of his prominent first ascents in the Alps and the Karakoram, Reinhold Messner has described Buhl as the best all-round mountaineer of his time. His solo ascent of Nanga Parbat was made against explicit orders. This sat uneasily with the nationalist framing under which the West German and Austrian public had followed the expedition, since the mountain had been styled as a "German fate-mountain" (Schicksalsberg der Deutschen) after earlier German expeditions in the 1930s. Rather than mounting heavily equipped, large-scale expeditions, he preferred travelling light, climbing fast, and forgoing supplemental oxygen. He was also a role model for climbers of younger generations, including Reinhold Messner and Peter Habeler, who cited Buhl as one of his inspirations.

In 2006, the Austrian mountaineer and alpine historian Markus Kronthaler died from exhaustion during the descent after reaching the summit of Broad Peak.

=== Honoring ===
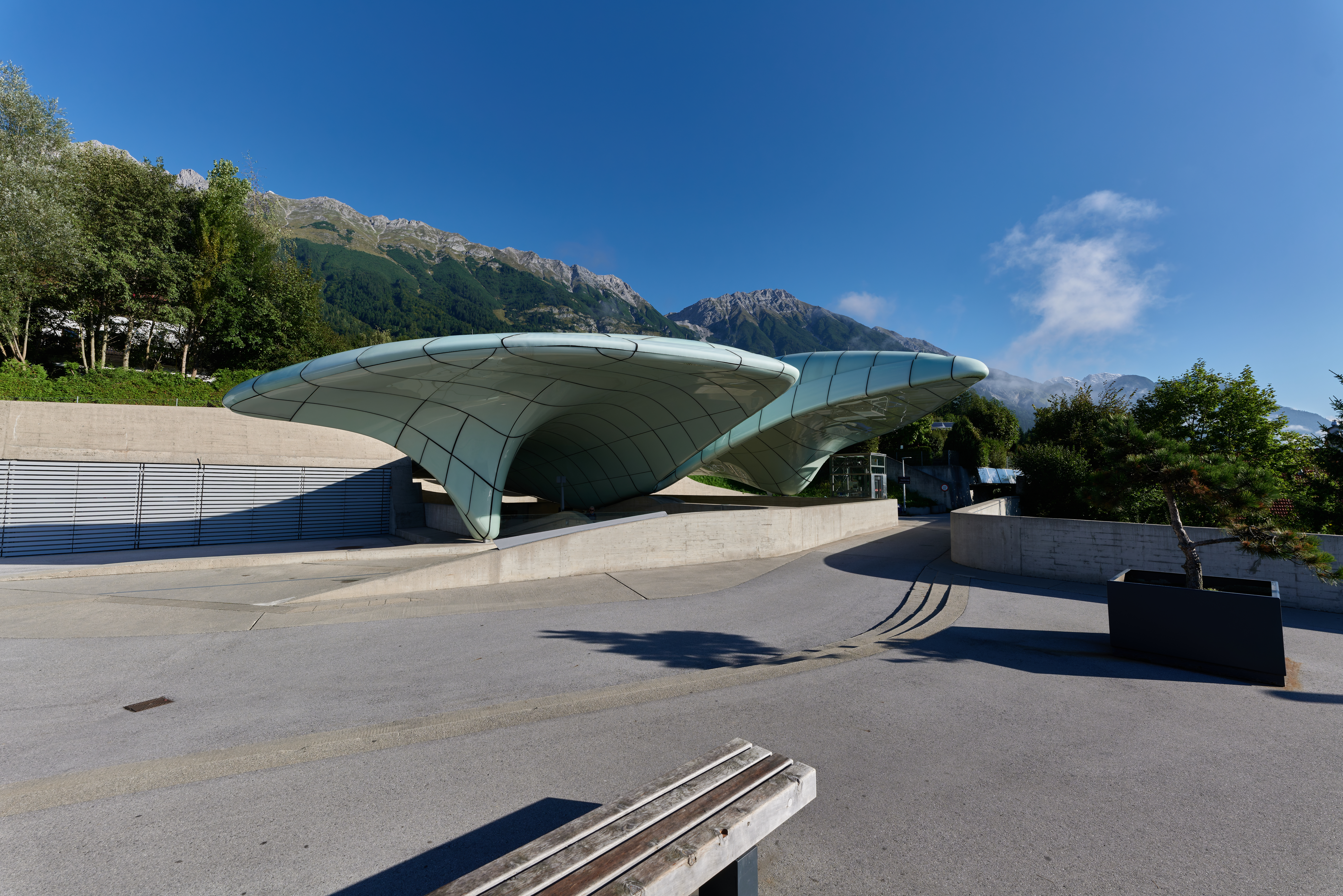
Hermann-Buhl Platz Innsbruck

On 24 September 2012, the previously unnamed square in front of the Hungerburgbahn mountain station in Innsbruck was named Hermann-Buhl-Platz after Hermann Buhl.

His expedition to Nanga Parbat was dramatized by Donald Shebib in the 1986 film The Climb, based in part on Buhl's own writings about the expedition and starring Bruce Greenwood as Buhl.

== Publications ==
- Buhl, Hermann (1956). Nanga Parbat Pilgrimage. Hodder & Stoughton. ASIN B0000CJH7J.
- Buhl, Hermann (1999). Nanga Parbat Pilgrimage: The Lonely Challenge. Seattle, WA, USA.: Mountaineers Books. ISBN 0-89886-610-3.

== See also ==
- List of famous Austrians
- List of Austrian mountaineers
- List of climbers
