= Pfelderer Tal =

Valley in South Tyrol, Italy

Coordinates: 46°48′13″N 11°6′53″E

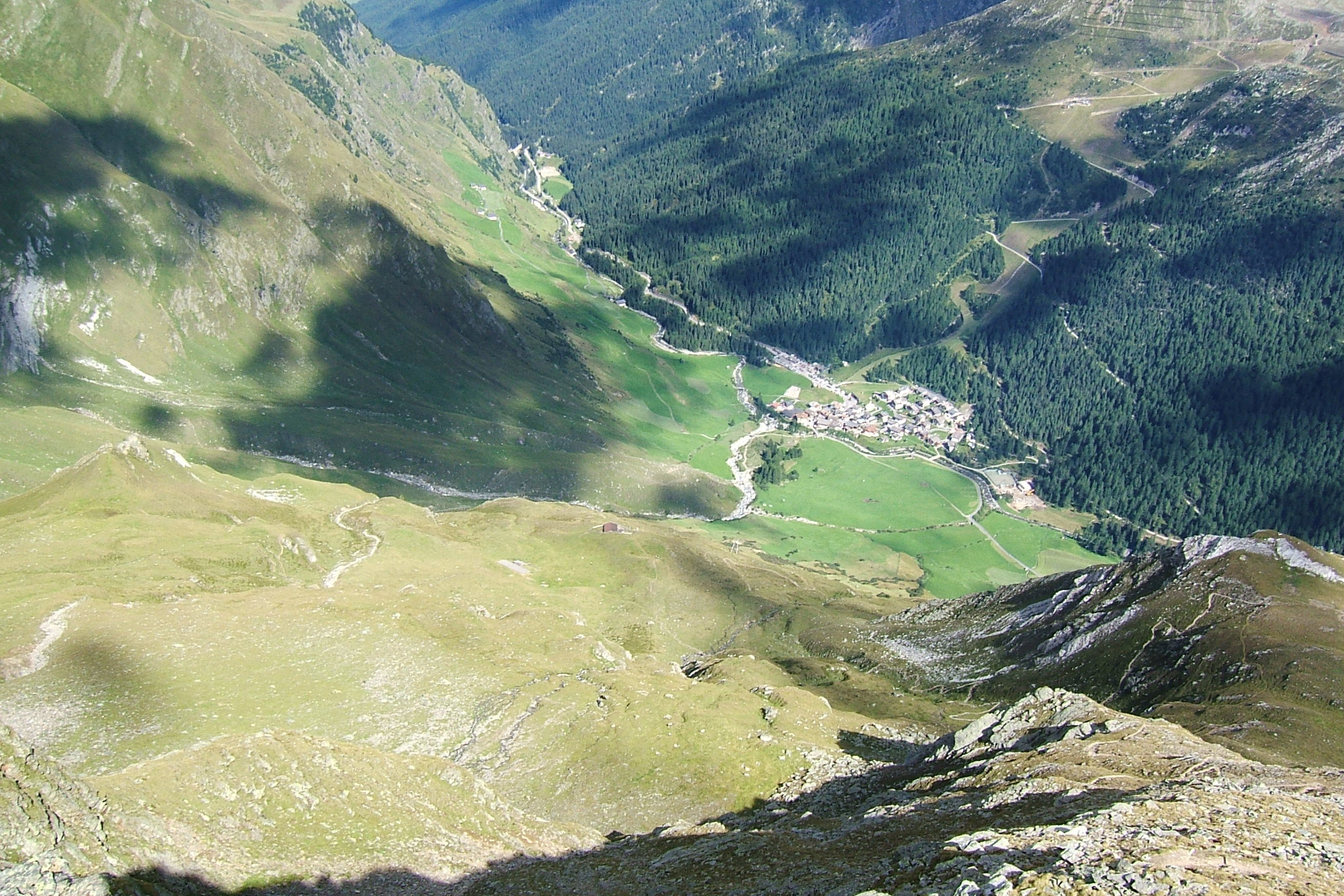
Pfelders and the Pfelderer Tal seen from the path to the Zwickauer Hütte

The Pfelderer Tal, also Pfelderstal (Italian: Val di Plan; German: Pfelderer Tal), is a side valley of the Passeier Valley in South Tyrol, Italy.
