= William Woodman Graham =

British mountaineer

William Woodman Graham by unknown photographer

William Woodman Graham (1859 – fl. 1932) was a British mountaineer who led the first pure mountaineering expedition to the Himalayas and may have set a world altitude record on Kabru. Motivated by adventure rather than a desire for fame, he had little interest in publicising his climbs, and as a result relatively little is known about his life and achievements.

== Early life ==
Graham was born in the summer of 1859 in Woodberry Down or Harrow, London to William Frederick and Louisa Graham (née Neron or Heron). On 8 December 1880, he received a B.A. from New College, Oxford. He continued as a law student and in late December 1882 passed the exam at the Middle Temple to become a barrister. Graham is known to have climbed extensively in the Alps, reaching most of the major summits. On 20 August 1882, Auguste Cupelin, Alphonse Payot and he made the official first ascent of the Dent du Géant, considered the last major prize in the Alps. While they used the fixed ropes and iron stanchions put in place over a four-day period by Jean Joseph and Baptiste Maquignaz, who twice concluded their ascent three to four weeks before at the slightly lower Point Sella (named after their clients), Graham's party's crossing of an 'extremely awkward notch' to the higher Point Graham was marked by the British alpine community as the end of the silver age of alpinism. Nevertheless, his application to join the Alpine Club was rejected for reasons which are unclear, but the size of the majority against him suggests that he had made influential enemies.

== Himalayan expedition ==
In 1883, shortly after he had qualified as a barrister, Graham made a visit to the Himalayas in the company of Swiss Alpine guide Josef Imboden of St. Niklaus in the canton Valais. While many of the lower mountains of the Himalaya had been climbed by surveyors and explorers, mainly to make observations of more distant peaks, Graham was the first person to visit the range solely for the purpose of mountaineering. He spent the spring trekking in the region of Kanchenjunga, but he was forced to return to Darjeeling by the cold weather and the fact that a porter had accidentally burned his boots.

By then, Imboden had contracted fever and opted to go home. Once in Darjeeling, Graham contacted the Grindelwald climber Emil Boss to find him another guide. Instead, Boss decided to join together with his hometown guide Ulrich Kaufmann, with whom he had nearly completed the first ascent of New Zealand's Mount Cook the previous year. At the end of June the party set off for Garhwal where they explored the region around Nanda Devi. Unable to penetrate the Nanda Devi Sanctuary they turned their attention towards Dunagiri, where Graham claimed to have reached a height of around 22,700 ft (6,920 m) before being forced to retreat by bad weather.

Graham and his companions next attempted a nearby peak, which they believed was the one marked on the map as A21, now known as Changabang. They made an ascent by the West Ridge, which Graham described as "a fair climb, but [one that] presented no great difficulties." Modern observers, however, agree that whatever mountain Graham climbed it was not Changabang, which from the west presents a sheer wall which was not climbed until 1976, and certainly not the easy ridge that Graham described. It is more likely that he was on the wrong mountain; possibly a subsidiary summit on the southern ridge of Dunagiri.

Graham's confusion was partly due to the poor quality of the maps of the area, and on his return to civilisation he was critical of the Great Trigonometric Survey, suggesting that its surveyors should be trained in mountaineering by the Swiss Army, whom he credited with the finest cartographic work in the world at the time. The criticism was not well received by the Survey, and it may have made Graham more enemies to cast doubt on his accomplishments.

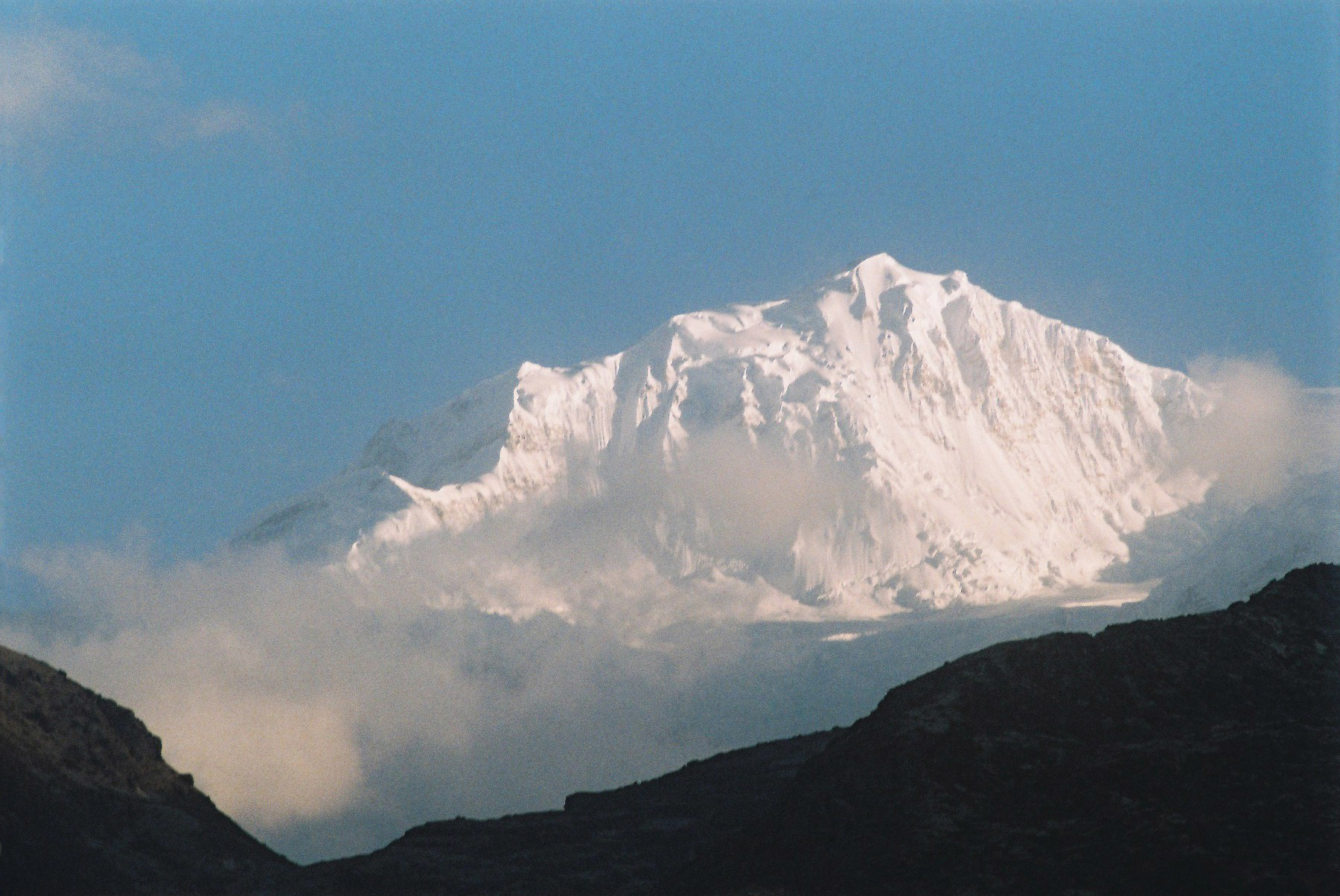
Kabru, which Graham claimed to have climbed.

After the Garhwal trip, Graham and his companions returned to the Kanchenjunga area for the climax of their campaign; an attempt on Kabru, which Graham claimed to have climbed by the East Face in three days, reaching the summit on 8 September. After Kabru, Graham attempted several other mountains in the area, but the onset of winter prevented him from making serious progress on any of them. Kabru, at 7,349 m (24,111 ft), was far higher than any other mountain climbed at the time, and its ascent was and remains the most controversial aspect of Graham's expedition. Doubt was cast on whether he really had climbed this mountain or whether he had mistaken a nearby, lower mountain called Forked Peak (6,200 m, 20,340 ft) for Kabru. His ascent was doubted by members of the Great Trigonometrical Survey, whose maps of the area Graham had criticized in his June 1884 presentation at the Royal Geographical Society, and by a few contemporaries including Martin Conway and William Hunter Workman, both of whom had rival (lower) claims to the world altitude record. However, it was supported by climbers such as Norman Collie, Thomas Longstaff, Douglas Freshfield, and Carl Rubenson – Freshfield having travelled extensively in the same area himself and Rubenson having reached the same point on Kabru in 1907. In his 1955 history of Himalayan climbing Kenneth Mason argued that Graham had not climbed Kabru, pointing to the vagueness of his description of the mountain, inconsistencies between his account and modern observations of the mountain, the remarkably quick ascent he claimed, and the fact that he appeared to have suffered little or no altitude sickness on his ascent. In a more recent history, Walt Unsworth argued that the vagueness of Graham's account was to be expected from a man who was a mountaineer rather than a surveyor, and that now Mount Everest has been climbed in a single day without oxygen, Graham's claims seem less outlandish than they once did, so that he should perhaps be credited with the ascent after all. In a 10-page analysis in 2009, Blaser and Hughes argued that "it is time to put the doubts to rest, and give Graham, Boss and Kauffmann their due credit for an extraordinary achievement".

== Later life ==
He disappeared from mountaineering history after his year in the Himalayas and after making his initial report of his Himalayan expedition he never made any further comment or engaged in the ensuing controversy. For many years it was rumoured that he lost all his money and ended his days as a cowboy in the United States. Instead, he had soon moved to Mexico, where in October 1888 he obtained the rights to explore and exploit up to 30 mines in a 600 km^{2} area of Barrancas del Cobre (Copper Canyons) in Chihuahua. In 1898, he still was registered as (the only) mining company owner in Copper Canyon. On 8 August 1900, in Mexico City, he married Marie Heimké. Marie was the daughter of William Heimké, since 1895 American consul at Chihuahua, and later Envoy Extraordinary and Minister Plenipotentiary to Guatemala and El Salvador. Graham's wife died young of a heart attack, on 18 July 1904 in Mexico City. In her obituary, he was described as a banker, but until 1910 Graham listed himself as a mining engineer in Durango and was an associate of the American Society of Engineers. From 1910 until 1932, he served as British Consul in Durango. In 1927, when he went on vacation in the United States for three months, he was married to a person named Anette. The year of his death is unknown.
