= John Brandon =

John Brandon may refer to:

- John Brandon (divine) (fl. 1687), English divine
- John Raphael Rodrigues Brandon (1817–1877), British architect
- Johnny Brandon (1925–2017), English singer/songwriter
- John Brandon (actor) (1929–2014), American film and television actor
- John Brandon (MP) for Bishop's Lynn
- John Marvin Brandon (1888–1960), politician from Alabama
- John Brandon (writer), American writer

== See also ==
- John Brandon-Jones (1908–1999), British architect
