= Blaydes Yard =

Shipbuilder in Kingston upon Hull, England

Blaydes' Yard was a private shipbuilder in Kingston upon Hull, England, founded in the 18th century which fulfilled multiple Royal Navy contracts. Her most notable ship was HMS Bounty famed for its mutiny.

== History ==
Hugh Blaydes was born in 1686 and started building ships with his sons in 1740. Their yard was at Hessle Cliff on the Humber Estuary on the edge of Kingston upon Hull. They had a second North End Yard close to their home at 6 High Street (now known as Blaydes House).

By the 1780s the yard was being run by Benjamin Blaydes, Hugh's grandson. The Blaydes family were very prominent in Hull and provided three mayors: Joseph (1636/7), Benjamin (1771/2), Benjamin (1788).

Blaydes Street in Hull, a traditional two storey brick street is named after the family. The family created the company of Blaydes, Loft, Gee & Co. shipowners.

James Blaydes married Ann Marvell, sister of Andrew Marvell. Later members of the family left Hull and moved to Ranby Hall, a large country estate.

Their descendants included Frederick Henry Marvell Blaydes and Sir Rowland Blades, Lord Mayor of London.

Blydes' North End Yard has been chosen as the new home of the Arctic Corsair.

== Notable ships ==
- HMS Success, 1740
- HMS Adventure, 1741
- HMS Anglesea, 1742
- HMS Poole, 1745
- HMS Raven, 1745
- HMS Centaur, 1746
- HMS Tavistock, 1747
- HMS Scarborough, 1756
- HMS Rose, 1757
- HMS Temple, 1758
- HMS Tweed, 1759
- HMS Mermaid, 1761
- HMS Ardent, 1764
- HMS Diamond, 1774
- HMS Boreas, 1774, captained by Horatio Nelson
- HMS Bounty, 1784, built as Bethia and converted 1787

== See also ==
- Earle's Shipbuilding also in Hull
