= Lyth =

Lyth may refer to:

== People ==
- R. L. Hudson (born 1940), British mathematician
- Adam Lyth (born 1987), English Test cricketer
- David H. Lyth, researcher in particle cosmology
- Isabel Menzies Lyth (1917–2008), British psychoanalyst
- John Lyth (1821–1886), English Wesleyan Methodist preacher, author, historian and hymn writer
- Mary Ann Lyth (1811–1890), English missionary, translator, and teacher

== Places ==
- Crosthwaite and Lyth, civil parish in the South Lakeland district of Cumbria, England
- Lyth Hill Countryside Site, Shropshire
- Lyth Valley, on the edge of the Lake District National Park in Cumbria, England
