= St Peter's 2-8 =

St Peter's 2-8 (Pre-prep to St Peter's School, York)

Location
- St Peter's 2-8; York, North Yorkshire, YO30 6AB; England
- Coordinates: 53.96695°N 1.09497°W

Information
- Type: Independent school with boarding
- Motto: Super Antiquas Vias
- Established: 1890
- Founder: Gertrude Singleton
- Local authority: City of York Council
- Head: Antonia Clarke
- Gender: Co-educational
- Age: 3 to 8
- Enrolment: c. 600
- Colours: Blue and Gold
- Website: http://www.st-peters.york.sch.uk

St Peter's 2-8 (formerly known as Clifton Pre-Preparatory School and Nursery) is the pre-preparatory school to St Peter's School, a co-educational independent boarding and day school located in the English City of York, with extensive grounds on the banks of the River Ouse.

== History ==
Clifton was founded by Miss Gertrude Singleton in 1890, who then ran it with her sister. During World War II the school continued operating despite air raids and bombings. By the 1980s, the school had developed a relationship with St Olave's and St Peter's, with many boys from Clifton continuing their education at both schools; St Olave's and St Peter's did not become coeducational until 1987 and the 1970s respectively. St Peter's purchased Clifton in 1994 and retained it as the pre-preparatory section. Clifton moved into its current building – the Chilman Building – in 2001.

In February 2018, Clifton School and Nursery was named as the best pre-prep/prep school in the annual TES Independent School Awards.

In summer 2020 Clifton Pre-Preparatory School and Nursery was renamed St Peter's 2-8, and in April 2021 St Peter's 2-8 was named the best pre-prep school and independent school of the year in the annual TES Independent School Awards.

== Structure ==
St Peter's School, York, offers a continuity of education from the St Peter's 2-8 (ages 2–8), to St Peter's 8-13 (ages 8–13) and through to St Peter's School (ages 13–18) where there is also a successful Sixth Form.

== Campus ==
St Peter's 2-8 is located on the Upper Campus of the school, next door to the senior school which runs along the main road of Bootham in the centre of York. The school campus itself stretches right down to the banks of the River Ouse.

== Notable former pupils ==
- Judi Dench, actress
