= List of boarding schools in the United Kingdom =

The following is a list of notable boarding schools in the United Kingdom.

Many of the private schools in the United Kingdom are boarding schools, although nearly all also have day pupils, and there are also a few state boarding schools in England.

== England and Wales ==
- Ackworth School
- Abbotsholme School
- Abingdon School
- Aldenham School
- Ampleforth College
- Ardingly College
- Atlantic College (United World College of the Atlantic)
- Battle Abbey School
- Bedales School
- Bedford School
- Benenden School
- Bishop's Stortford College
- Bloxham School
- Bootham School
- Bradfield College
- Brambletye School
- Brentwood School
- Brighton College
- Brockhurst and Marlston House School
- Brockwood Park School
- Bromsgrove School
- Bryanston School
- Burgess Hill Girls
- Caldicott School
- Canford School
- CATS College Canterbury (formerly Stafford House College)
- Charterhouse School
- Cheltenham College
- Cheltenham Ladies College
- Christ College, Brecon
- Christ's Hospital
- City of London Freemen's School
- Clifton College
- Cranleigh School
- Culford School
- Dauntsey's School
- David Game College, London
- Dean Close School
- Denstone College
- Downe House
- Downside School
- Dulwich College
- Eastbourne College
- Education First EF Academy Oxford
- Education First EF Academy Torquay
- Embley
- Epsom College
- Eton College
- Felsted School
- Framlingham College
- Frensham Heights School
- Fyling Hall School
- Giggleswick School
- Godolphin School
- Gresham's School
- Haileybury and Imperial Service College
- Harrow School
- Haberdashers' Monmouth School
- Harrogate Ladies' College
- Headington Rye Oxford
- Heathfield School
- Hurstpierpoint College
- Ipswich School
- Ipswich High School
- Kensington Park School
- Kimbolton School
- King's College, Taunton
- King's School, Bruton
- King Edward's School, Witley
- The King's School, Canterbury
- King's Ely
- Kingham Hill School
- Lancing College
- Langley School, Loddon
- Loughborough Grammar School
- Lucton School
- Marlborough College
- Malvern College
- Mayfield School, Mayfield
- Millfield School
- Mill Hill School
- Milton Abbey School
- Monkton Combe School
- Mount Kelly School
- New College Worcester
- The Oratory School
- Oakham School
- Oundle School
- Pangbourne College
- Pocklington School
- Queen Elizabeth's Hospital
- Queen Ethelburga's Collegiate
- Queenswood School
- Radley College
- Repton School
- Rikkyo School in England
- Rishworth School
- Roedean School
- Rossall School
- Royal Russell School
- The Royal Alexandra and Albert School
- The Royal Hospital School
- Truro School
- Rugby School
- Rydal Penrhos
- Ryde School
- Sandroyd School
- Scarborough College
- Seaford College
- Sedbergh School
- Sevenoaks School
- Sherborne School
- Sherborne Girls
- Sherborne International
- Shiplake College
- Shrewsbury School
- Stamford School
- St Andrew's College, Cambridge
- St Catherine's School, Bramley
- St Christopher School, Letchworth
- St Clare's International School, Oxford
- St Edward's School, Oxford
- St George's School, Ascot
- St Hugh's School, Faringdon
- St Hugh's School, Woodhall Spa
- St Joseph's College, Ipswich
- St Lawrence College, Ramsgate
- St Mary's School Calne
- St Mary's School, Cambridge
- St Peter's School, York
- St Swithun's School, Winchester
- Stoke College
- Stonyhurst College
- Stowe School
- Taunton School
- Teikyo School United Kingdom
- Tettenhall College
- Tonbridge School
- Trent College
- Tring Park School
- Tudor Hall School
- Uppingham School
- Warminster School
- Warwick School
- Wellington College
- Wellington School, Somerset
- West Heath School
- West Hill Park School
- Westminster School
- Westonbirt School
- Whitgift School
- Winchester College
- Woodbridge School
- Worksop College
- Worth School
- Wycliffe College, Gloucestershire
- Wycombe Abbey
- Wymondham College

== Northern Ireland ==
- Campbell College
- Rockport School
- The Royal School, Armagh
- Royal School Dungannon
- Victoria College, Belfast

== Scotland ==
- Ardvreck School
- Belhaven Hill School
- Cargilfield Preparatory School
- Dollar Academy
- Donaldson's College
- Fettes College
- Glenalmond College
- Gordonstoun School
- Lathallan School
- Lomond School
- Loretto School
- The Mary Erskine School
- Merchiston Castle School
- Queen Victoria School
- St George's School, Edinburgh
- St Leonards School
- St Mary's Music School
- St. Mary's School, Melrose
- Stewart's Melville College
- Strathallan School

== Defunct, or no longer boarding ==
- Ashville College - day school only from September 2025
- Bedstone College - closed in July 2025
- Blairmore School
- Clifton House School - closed in 1968
- Fulneck School
- Keil School
- Kilgraston School
- Kilquhanity School
- Mayfield College
- Methodist College Belfast
- Mount St Mary's College, Spinkhill
- Queen Margaret's School, York
- Rannoch School
- Rye St Antony School - closed in 2024 upon merger
- The Perse School
- Silcoates School
- St Mary's School, Shaftesbury
- Friends' School, Saffron Walden
- Welbeck College - closed in 2021
