= Cutforth =

Cutforth is a surname. Notable people with the surname include:

- Lancelot Eric Cutforth (1899–1980), British Army officer
- René Cutforth (1909–1984), British journalist, television and radio broadcaster, and writer
