= Thomas Lewis (controversialist) =

English cleric

Thomas Lewis (1689–in or after 1737) was an English cleric, noted as a vitriolic High Church writer of the Bangorian controversy.

== Early life ==
The son of Stephen Lewis, vicar of Weobly and rector of Holgate, Shropshire, he was born at Kington, Herefordshire, on 14 March 1689. He was educated at Hereford Free School, under a Mr. Traherne. He was admitted a Bible clerk at Corpus Christi College, Oxford, where he matriculated 3 July 1704, and graduated B.A. in 1711. He does not appear to have proceeded M.A., but was ordained priest in 1713 at Worcester.

== High Church propagandist ==
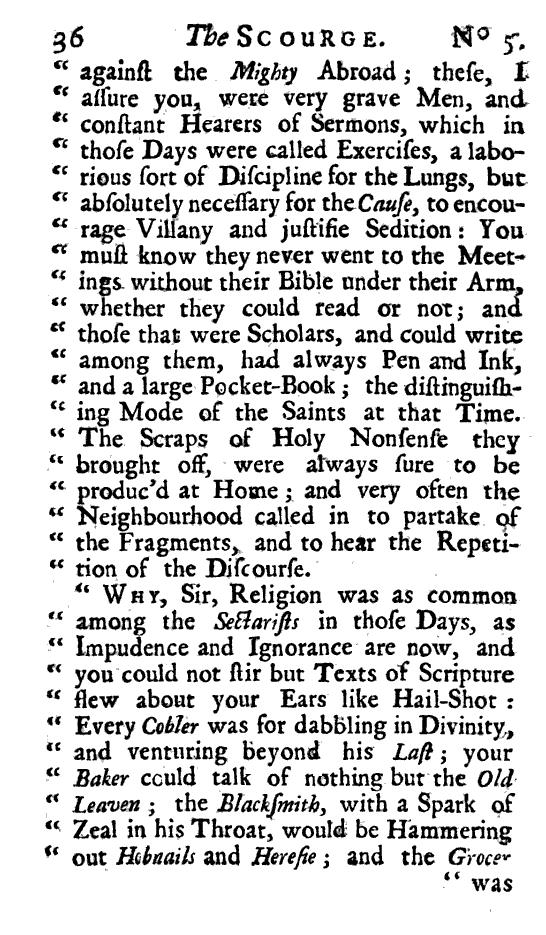
Page from The Scourge, attacking nonconformists of the 1640s

In 1717 Lewis established The Scourge, in vindication of the Church of England, a periodical sheet that appeared every Monday. It abused dissenters, latitudinarians, and Catholics. On 15 July 1717 Lewis denounced Benjamin Hoadly from the text, "Who is this uncircumcised Philistine that he should defie the Armes of the Living God?" Six weeks later he launched an attack on Scottish presbyterianism with the words "Every beast loveth his like". The paper was presented by the grand jury of Westminster as the work of a libeller and an embroiler of the nation, and Lewis, who absconded, was ordered to stand his trial for sedition at the court of king's bench. In the meantime there appeared The Scourge Scourged, or a short Account of the Life of the Author of the Scourge, vilifying Lewis and his "weekly excrement".

From his hiding-place Lewis issued The Danger of the Church Establishment of England. This epistle, which included a further attack upon Hoadly, passed through two editions, and was answered by A brief Answer to a long Libel. Lewis had the last word in the controversy with his Anatomy of the Heretical Synod of Dissenters at Salter's Hall, 1719.

== Later life ==
About 1720 Lewis appears to have been acting as curate at St Clement Danes. In 1735 he been keeping a private boarding-school for several years, in Hampstead. Leaving there in 1737 he settled at Chelsea, and sent an account of his life to Thomas Rawlinson on 12 September 1737.

== Works ==
Lewis also wrote:

- An Historical Essay upon the Consecration of Churches, 1719.
- The Nature of Hell-Fire, the Reality of Hell-Fire, and the Eternity of Hell Torments explain'd and Vindicated, 1720. This work responded to the annihilationism of Samuel Richardson.
- The Obligation of Christians to beautify and adorn their Churches, shewn from the authority of the Holy Scriptures, from the Practice of the Primitive Church, and from the Discipline of the Church of England Established by Law, London, 1721.
- Seasonable Considerations on the Indecent and Dangerous Custom of Burying in Churches and Church Fields, 1721.
- The History of Hypatia. A most impudent School-Mistress of Alexandria. Murdered and torn to pieces by the Populace. In defence of Saint Cyril and the Alexandrian Clergy from the Aspersions of Mr. Toland, 1721: a reply to the third section of John Toland's Tetradymus (1720).
- Origines Hebrææ. The Antiquities of the Hebrew Republick, in 4 books, designed as an exposition of every branch of Levitical Law and all the Ceremonies of the Hebrews, both civil and sacred, London, 1724. This compilation from Jewish and Christian writer was reprinted at the Clarendon press in 1834, 3 vols. A summary of the contents was given in James Darling's Cyclopaedia col. 1835.
- Churches no Charnel Houses, a reiteration of the arguments from Seasonable Considerations.
- The History of the Parthian Empire … contained in a succession of twenty-nine Kings, compiled from the Greek and Latin Historians and other Writers, 1728.
- An Enquiry into the Shape, the Beauty, and Stature of the Person of Christ and of the Virgin Mary offered to the consideration of the late Converts to Popery, 1735; Lewis concludes that Jesus was in appearance rather ill-favoured.

Lewis also edited a translation of Robert Sanderson's Casus Conscientiæ, as A Preservation against Schism and Rebellion, 1722.

== Notes ==
Attribution

This article incorporates text from a publication now in the public domain: Lee, Sidney, ed. (1893). "Lewis, Thomas (1689-1749?)". Dictionary of National Biography. Vol. 33. London: Smith, Elder & Co.
