= George Yeld =

British schoolmaster and plant hybridist

- Born: 1845; Herefordshire, England
- Died: April 1938 (aged 92–93); Orleton, Gerrards Cross?
- Education: Hereford Cathedral School
- Alma mater: Brasenose College, Oxford
- Occupation: Schoolmaster
- Known for: Longest serving editor of the Alpine Journal, plant hybridist

George Yeld (1845–1938) was a schoolmaster, climber, explorer and hybridiser of daylilies and irises. He was a member of the Alpine Club and editor of the Alpine Journal. Much of his climbing and exploration was conducted with volcanologist Tempest Anderson and he published reports of his exploits and produced introductory books on Latin for scholars. Yeld received the Victoria Medal of Honour from the Royal Horticultural Society in 1925.

== Education and family life ==
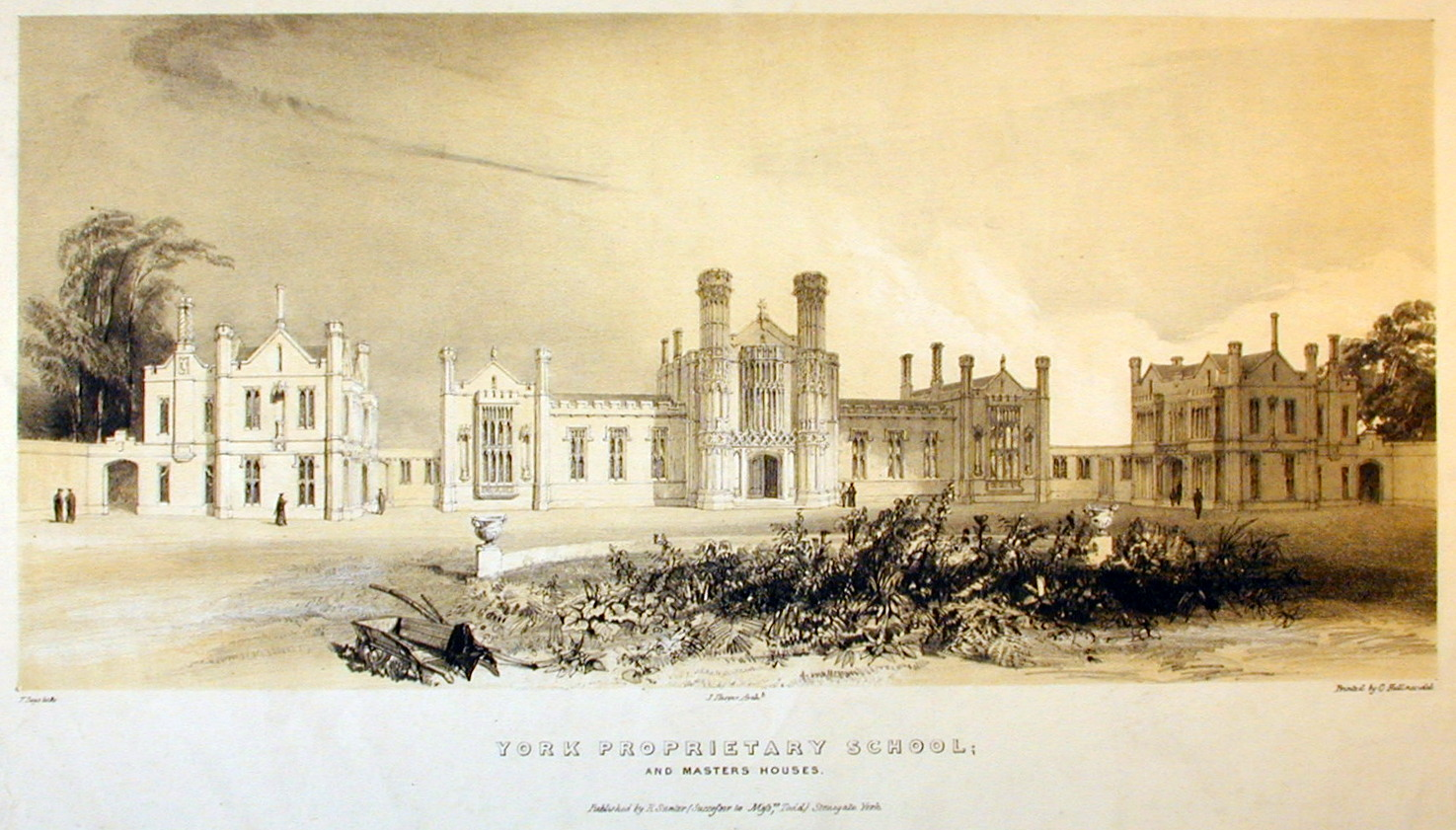
St Peter's School, York as it would have been during Yeld's career

Yeld was born in 1845 and educated at Hereford Cathedral School. He continued his education at Brasenose College Oxford where he was awarded the Newdigate Prize for his poem "Virgil reading his Æneid to Augustus and Octavia".

In April 1877 he married Emily Elizabeth Adams (1852–1921) the niece of Professor John Couch Adams and sister of the Reverend Thomas Adams MA, mathematics master at St Peter's School in York, at which Yeld also taught. He had four sons who all attended St Peter's.

In retirement, he appears to have lived in Gerrards Cross, Buckinghamshire.

== Teaching career ==
Now here I add a postscript—the most important part,
A sympathetic chord 'twill touch in every Peterite heart.
It was just fifty years ago to York from Oxford came
A poet, scholar, gentleman, whose deeds we do acclaim.
In School he's worked as only those can work whose heart is there,
The father, son, and grandson, too, he's coaxed to love Shakespeare.
He cheers the boat, and Rugby too, and once a year at Cricket,
In spite of three score years and twelve, he nips across the wicket.
Long may he climb the lofty Alps, march with the O.T.C.,
So from our hearts we'll celebrate our George Yeld's Jubilee!

— Poem dedicated to Yeld. Appeared in The Peterite, March 1918.

Yeld taught at St Peter's School from 1867 to 1919 (52 years). He appears to have been a popular teacher and involved in many aspects of the school. In particular, he organised well-regarded annual school plays. These appear to have always been Shakespeare and he began in 1879 due to the illness of another master with The Twelfth Night. Latterly, these gained higher profile and were sometimes attended by William Maclagan (Archbishop of York) and journalists from the Yorkshire Herald. Each year Yeld wrote an – often lengthy – epilogue or prologue to the plays summarising the achievements of its students or graduates – known as Old Peterites. Yeld himself was a member of the Old Peterites despite not having been a student at the school: in 1911 he became a vice-president. In December 1917 Yeld was presented with a purse and given plaudits from colleagues and alumni in celebration of his 50th year at the school (see inset quote). It's not clear whether Yeld had a subject specialism or which of his interests beyond literature made it into his teaching.

== Alpine Journal ==
Yeld served as Editor of the Alpine Journal for 30 years, initially virtually alone, later with John Percy Farrar. His solo editorship began in 1896 with Volume 18 and ended with Volume 24 in 1909. During this period climbing standards were improving and climbs in north and South America, the Himalaya and the Caucasus were being explored.

Farrar became Assistant Editor in 1909. His vibrant and outgoing temperament proved a stimulus to the Journal; though Yeld was nominally Editor, Farrar seems to have done much of the work. The period covered by their joint editorship was a significant one for British climbers: Himalayan peaks were tackled, climbers became more competent using guides less, equipment and techniques improved. Their joint editorship ended in 1926 with Volume 38 with a message of farewell from both of them.

== Alpine excursions ==
In August, during the school summer holidays, Yeld indulged his passion for climbing. His preference was for the eastern group of the Graian Alps as they did not attract the number of tourists that other alpine areas did.

Scrambles in the Eastern Graians 1878 – 1897, published in 1900, is his account of these visits, many of which had previously been included in the Alpine Journal. The book is dedicated to Dr. Tempest Anderson, York resident and photographer who accompanied him a number of times, and includes 12 of his photographs.

Most of the routes Yeld climbed and described were new and he pioneered two new ascents: Aiguille de Tronchey and Pointe du Piolet. He considered local guides indispensable and he looked on them as friends and employed the same men year after year. The use of ropes and axes was routine, but he describes his amazement in 1895 when one of the guides made use of wedges to climb a difficult face before pulling up the others.

Yeld frequently mentions the generosity of the local people in providing accommodation or food. On a climb of more than one day an overnight stay in a mountain refuge was not always possible. Local people then obliged but the shelter could be a shed shared with domestic livestock or a hayloft, or even a bed made with rhododendron branches. A number of times he dined on chamois or bouquetin (alpine ibex), which he preferred, given by local hunters.

He regularly saw bouquetin and chamois on the slopes. Once he was delighted by the activities of a very close group of 40 chamois. As a keen gardener he regretted he could not visit the mountains in June to see the alpine flora at its best, but he still found time to botanise and make plant lists. There are numerous references in the accounts to the glory of alpine flowers. He seems to have been fond of Ranunculus glacialis (the glacier buttercup) from the number of times it is mentioned and his delight in finding it.

== Plant breeding and hybridising ==
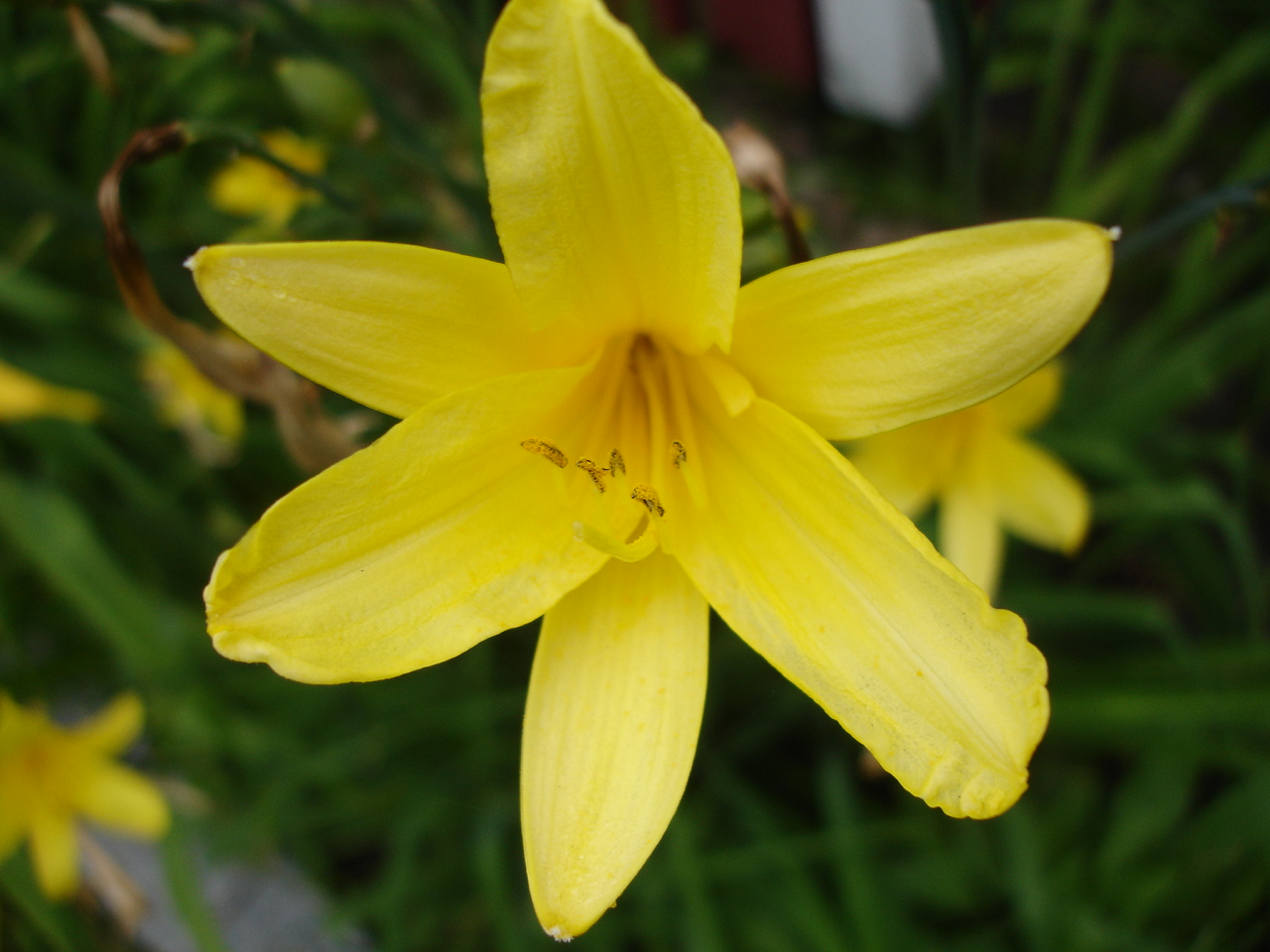

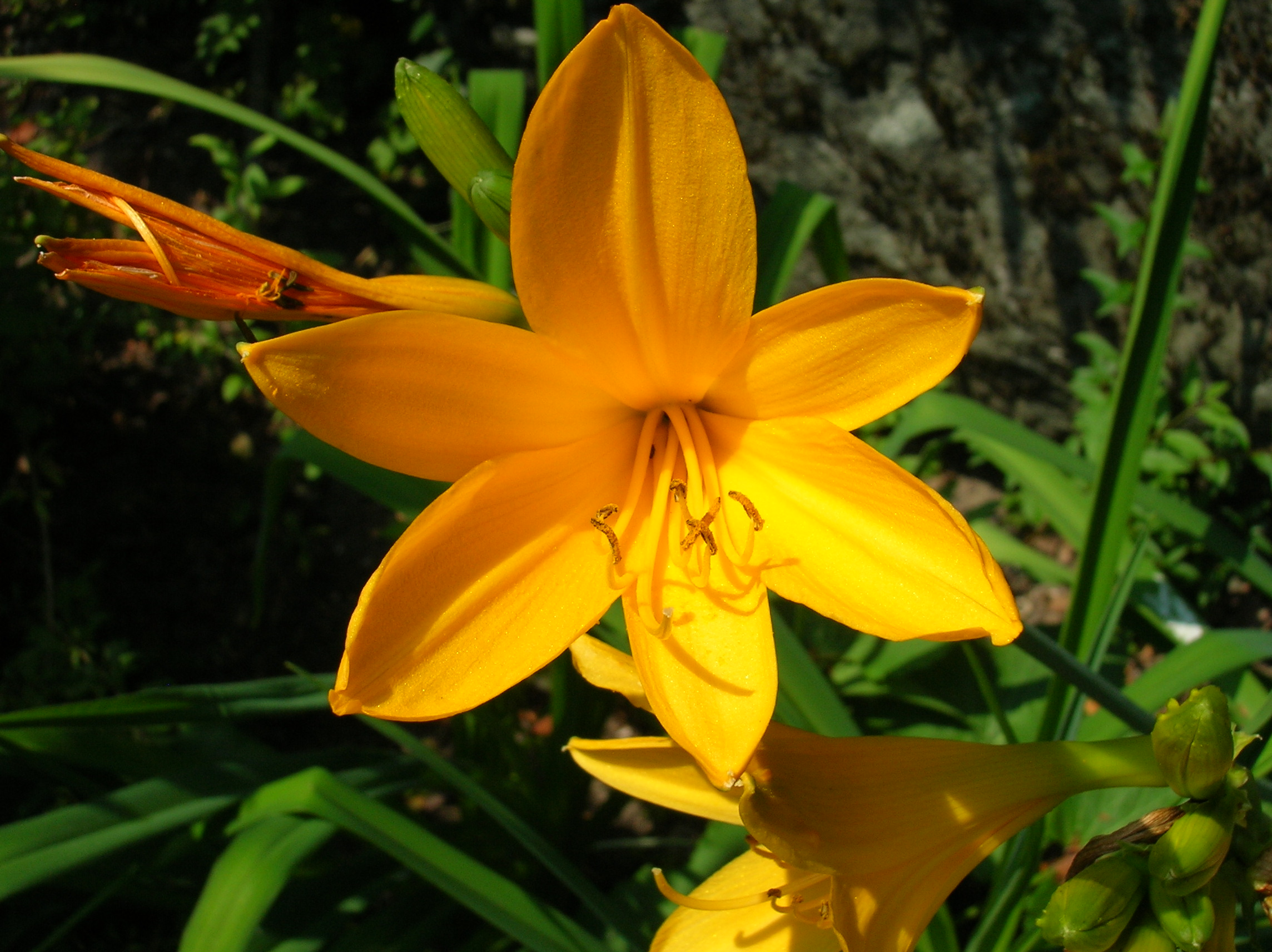
Hemerocallis flava and Hemerocallis middendorfii the parent's for Yeld's first cultivar daylily: Apricot

Yeld was an amateur breeder and hybridiser of the garden plants Hemerocallis (daylily) and Bearded Iris. He was one of the early pioneer breeders of Hemerocallis when there was very little material available. He was the first to introduce a hybrid, 'Apricot', which won the Royal Horticultural Society's Certificate of Merit in 1892 and is still available today. The 'Apricot' cultivar was bred from Hemerocallis lilioasphodelus L. (syn. flava) and H. middendorffii.

Subsequently, he obtained further species including low-growing ones such as H. minor. The lemon yellow hybrid 'Francis' was created from one of these smaller species winning the RHS Award of Merit in 1895.

During his lifetime he created and named over 30 hybrids including 'Gold Dust' which is still widely available.

Yeld also produced some well-known irises. In 1923 he became the first President of the Iris Society, now the British Iris Society, founded in 1922. He was a friend of another iris breeder, Sir Michael Foster, naming one of his plants 'Sir Michael'. This iris, and another called 'Lord of June', were famous for some time.

In 1927, Yeld was awarded the Foster Memorial Plaque by The Iris Society (named after Michael Foster).

== Publications ==
Yeld, George (1866). Virgil reading his Æneid to Augustus and Octavia. Oxford: T and G Shrimpton.

— —; Coolidge, W A B (1893). The mountains of Cogne. London: T Fisher Unwin, Conway and Coolidge's climber's guides.

— — (1900). Scrambles in the Eastern Graians 1878–1897. London: T Fisher Unwin.

— — edited for schools (1906). Kingsley's Andromeda, with the story of Perseus prefixed. London: Macmillan & Company.

— — edited with introduction and vocabulary (1906). Ovid. Selections.

— — (1908) Chapter IV Alpine Flowers in Coolidge, W A B, The Alps in Nature and History. London: Methuen and Co.

— – (1912). A First Virgil. Containing easy selections from the works of Virgil, with very brief notes. London: Blackie & Son.
