= Keith Mohan =

English cricketer (born 1935)

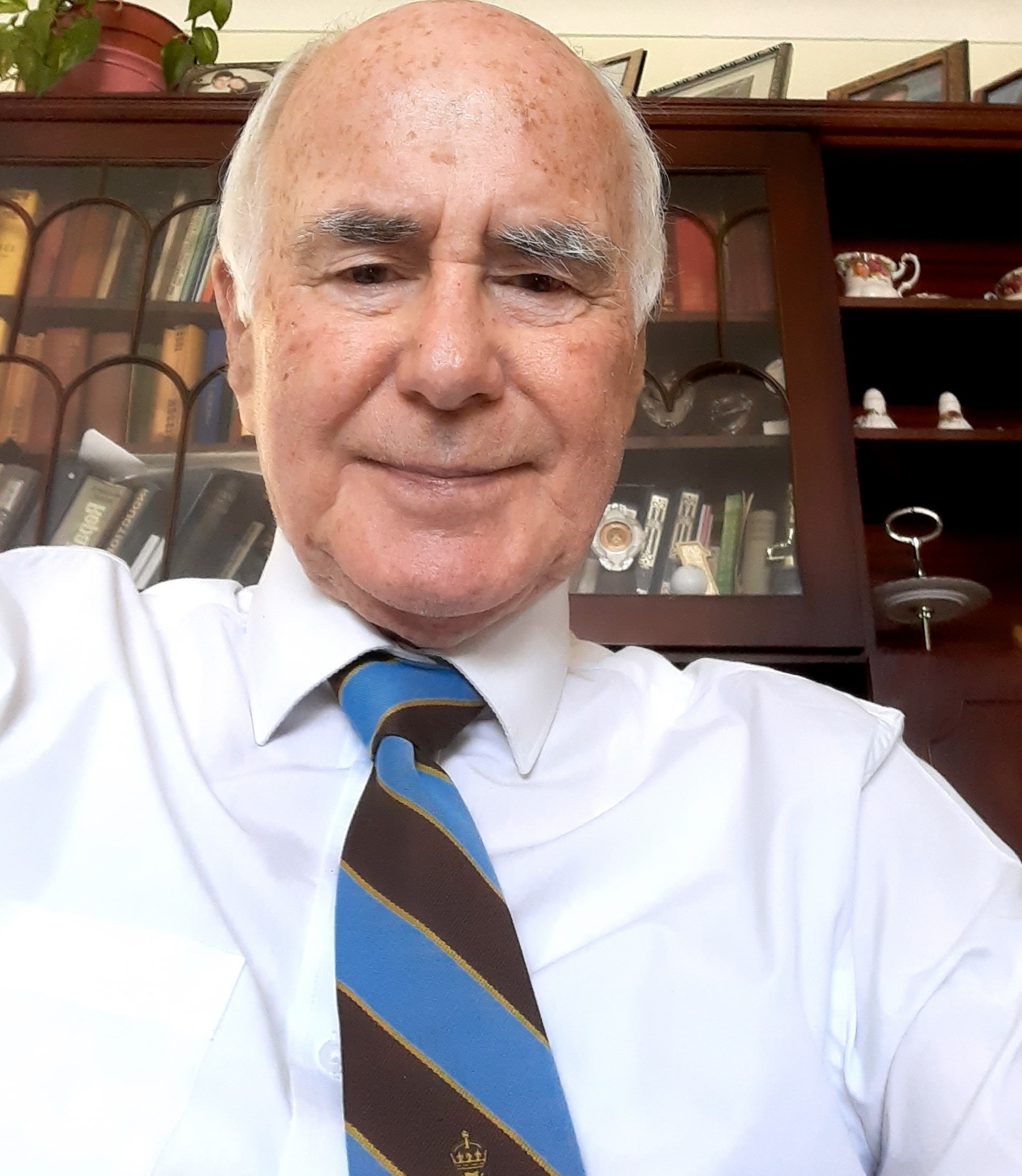

Personal information
- Full name: Keith Mohan
- Born: 11 June 1935 (age 91); Glossop, Derbyshire, England
- Batting: Right-handed
- Bowling: Leg-break and googly

Domestic team information
- Years: Team
- 1957–1958: Derbyshire
- FC debut: 31 July 1957 Derbyshire v Leicestershire
- Last FC: 23 August 1958 Derbyshire v Kent

Career statistics
Competition	First-class
Matches	10
Runs scored	163
Batting average	10.86
100s/50s	0/0
Top score	49
Balls bowled	42
Wickets	0
Bowling average	–
5 wickets in innings	–
10 wickets in match	–
Best bowling	–
Catches/stumpings	4/–
- Source: CricketArchive, January 2012

Keith Mohan (born 11 June 1935) was an English cricketer who played first-class cricket for Derbyshire in 1957 and 1958.

Mohan was born in Glossop, Derbyshire.

He played for Derbyshire School Boys in 1950 and then selected to play in North vs South U15s at Morley

He was selected for extra coaching by Jack Hobbs and Herbert Sutcliffe together with Ken Taylor and Geoff Pullar at Headingley and then subsequently at Lilleshall.

Both the above went onto play Test cricket.

He joined the staff of Derbyshire in 1952 as a leg spin and googly bowler. and represented the club in the Minor Counties Championship. He bowled regularly in the 2nd XI but was seldom used in the 1st XI taking many wickets; including 3 for 9 against Shropshire, 4 for 35 against Leicestershire (in 18 overs) and 4 for 21 and 2 for 29 against Nottinghamshire at Trent Bridge. He made his debut first-class appearance in the 1957 season against Leicestershire in July. He continued to play in the 1958 season. Mohan was a right-handed batsman and played 10 first-class matches scoring at an average of 10.68 and with a top score of 49. He bowled leg-break and googly but was hardly used as such in the first team.

Mohan played most of his cricket in the second XI and made his highest minor county score of 144 at Chesterfield against Leicestershire in 1958. He also got a score of 113 at Redcar against Yorkshire second XI and 97 in the following match against Warwickshire. He played again in 1963 against Warwickshire, scoring 82 not out. He continued playing in the Second XI side until 1969, strengthening the middle order with teammate William Oates.

Mohan was Cricket Professional at St Peter's School, York for 27 years between 1974 and 2002. In that position he coached many notable cricketers who went on to have success in the professional game. He also played for Glossop Cricket Club for many years.
