= Arthur Boycott =

British scientist (1877-1938)

Boycott in 1921.

Arthur Edwin Boycott FRS (6 April 1877, Hereford — 12 May 1938, Ewen) was a British pathologist and naturalist. While studying blood sedimentation he discovered that when test tubes are slightly tilted, sedimentation takes place at a much higher rate. This "Boycott effect", named after him, is involved in the phenomenon where bubbles in stout beer sink even though they are lighter than the beer.

On 8 December 2016, it was reported that a book that Boycott borrowed from Hereford Cathedral School sometime between 1886 and 1894 was returned to the school by his granddaughter Alice Gillett.
