= John Francis Walker =

British geologist

John Francis Walker FGS FCS FLS
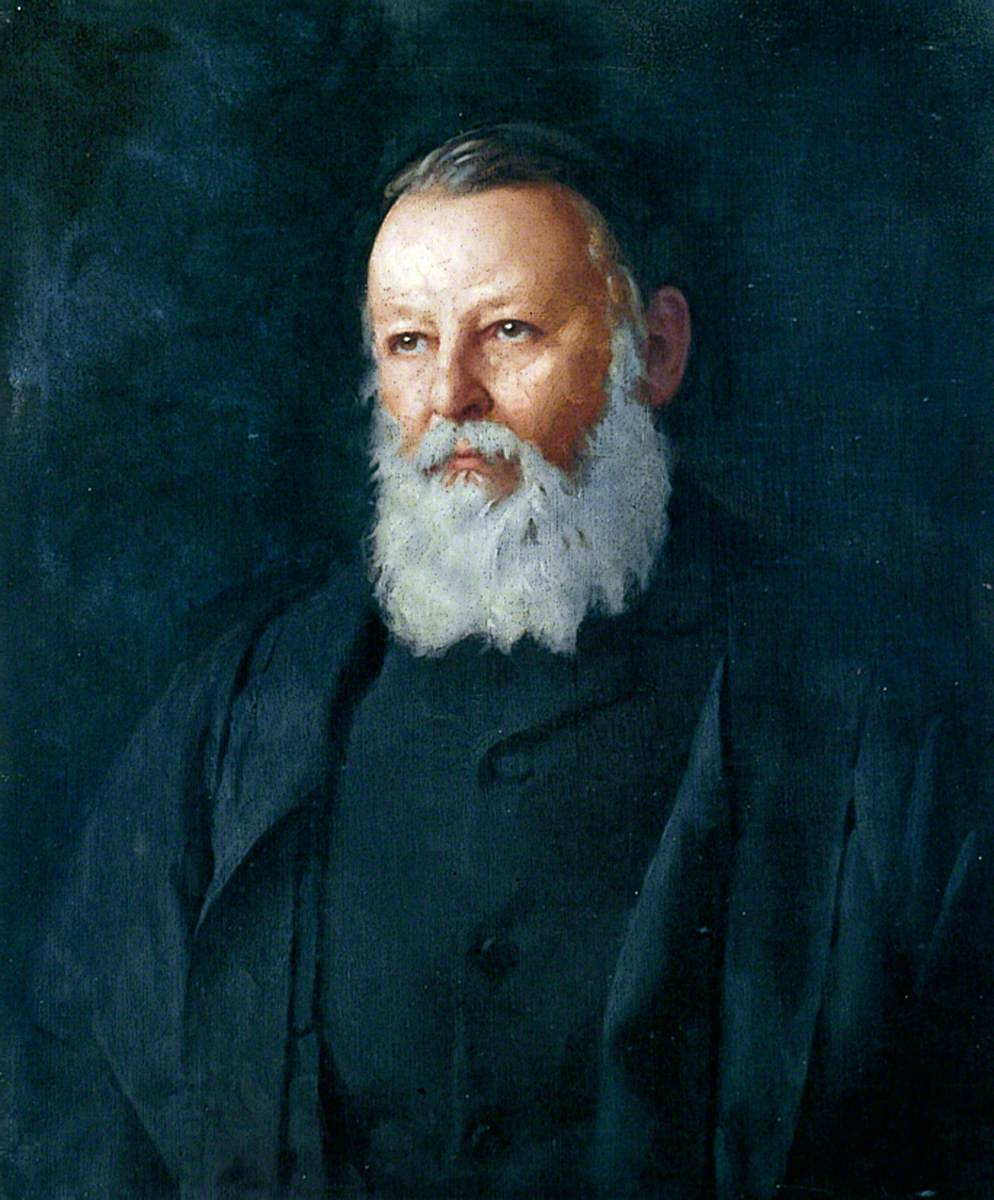
- Painting of J F Walker by Thomas Cooper Gotch
- Born: 25 November 1839; York
- Died: 23 May 1907 (aged 67)
- Education: Sidney Sussex College, Cambridge
- Spouse: Alice Cracknell
- Scientific career
- Fields: Geology; Chemistry
- Workplaces: University of Cambridge; Yorkshire Museum

John Francis Walker FGS FCS FLS (25 November 1839 – 23 May 1907) was a natural scientist, teacher, and museum curator.

== Biography ==
Walker was born in York, where his family had been for generations. His grandfather (Robert T. Horsley) had served as Sheriff of York in 1841. He was educated at St. Peter's School, York, and then at the Royal Agricultural College.

Walker was subsequently a student of Sidney Sussex College, Cambridge where he studied the Natural Sciences Tripos. After Cambridge he studied chemistry at the University of Bonn under August Kekulé and was in Germany during the Franco-Prussian War. When he returned to England he studied law and was called to the bar on 6 June 1874 and was a student of the Inner Temple though never practised. Instead, Walker became a lecturer in chemistry at University of Cambridge. He was also elected as a Fellow of Sidney Sussex College.

In 1882 Walker married Alice Cracknell and together they moved to 45 Bootham, York. Whilst in York, Walker dedicated much more time to his study of geology and palaeontology.

Walker was the honorary curator of geology at the Yorkshire Museum from 1893–1907. He also donated fossil specimens to the museum collection and served as the vice-president of the Yorkshire Philosophical Society (then the museum;s governing body). He was a specialist in Brachiopods.

Walker was elected as a Fellow of the Geological Society in 1867, a Fellow of the Linnean Society in 1873. He was also a Fellow of the Chemical Society, and a member of the Geologists' Association.

== Select publications ==
- Walker, J. F. 1867. "On some new Coprolite Workings in the Fens", Geological Magazine 4, 309-310.
- Walker, J. F. 1878. "On the Occurrence of Terebratula Morieri in England": Geological Magazine II, 5, 52-556.
- Walker, J. F. 1892. "The Discovery of Terebratulina substriata, Schlotheim, in Yorkshire", Geological Magazine 9, 364.
- Walker, J. F. 1903. "On a Fossiliferous Band at the top of the Lower Greensand near Leighton Buzzard, Bedfordshire", Quarterly Journal of the Geological Society 59, 234-265.
