= Samuel Richardson (Baptist) =

English layman and religious controversialist

Samuel Richardson (fl. 1646) was an English layman and religious controversialist of the 1640s and 1650s, of Baptist views.

== Life ==
From Northamptonshire, Richardson was probably an army preacher in the early part of the First English Civil War. He became a leading member of one of the seven Baptist churches of London: in the three confessions of faith put forth by these churches in 1643, 1644, and 1646, Richardson's signature stands beside that of John Spilsbury, minister of the congregation at Wapping.

Richardson supported the action of the parliamentary army and the government of Oliver Cromwell, to whom he had fee access. For a time he had scruples as to the title of "Lord Protector", and told Cromwell so to his face; then, becoming convinced, he tried to reconcile Vavasor Powell and others to the protectorate.

== Theological views ==
Richardson defended Baptist practices and held strongly monergistic beliefs about justification similar to those of Tobias Crisp before him, and later John Gill: he argued that salvation is exclusively by the grace of God and never depends on human faith or works, as justification is fully achieved on the cross as a result of the eternal decree of God to save the elect.

Richardson, as Tobias Crisp, held that the law is not necessary to bring persons to saving faith, and that the Puritan emphasis on the individual believer's consciousness of sin makes subjective sentiments the object of faith, rather than Christ: "We have made a Christ of our works, tears, and crying long enough", Richardson notes.

Human works as well as faith can only be considered results of God’s work in Christ as the Holy Spirit works in those who are justified. When Paul talks of justification by faith, he by “faith” simply means Christ. We are justified by Christ alone and not by our believing, Richardson claimed. Faith is an evidence of “interest in Christ but not a joint-partner with Christ”.

Richardson, in his Justification by Christ Alone from 1647, argued that the work of Christ alone is the means of justification:

“[W]e grant God has decreed the end and the means, and whatsoever God has decreed shall unavoidably come to pass. But we deny that faith is any means of our Redemption, Justification, or Salvation. Nothing but the Lord Jesus Christ is the means of our salvation. There are means that are necessary to the revealing and enjoying the comfort of it, as the Holy Spirit and ministers to reveal it and faith to receive it; also, there be fruits and effects of the love of God, as faith, love, and obedience to Christ…yet these are no means of our salvation.”

Though holding a position in most of his works that can be described as clearly Particular Baptist and thus Calvinistic, Richardson in his last work expressed a form of eschatological universalism.

== Works ==
Richardson wrote:

- Newes from Heaven of a Treaty of Peace, or a Cordiall for a Fainting Heart, 1643.
- The Life of Faith, in Justification, in Glorification, in Sanctification, in Infirmities, in Times Past, in all Ordinances, 1643.
- Some brief Considerations on Dr. Featley his Book, intituled "The Dipper Dipt", London, February 1646.
- Fifty Questions propounded to the Assembly, to answer by the Scriptures whether Corporal Punishment may be inflicted upon such as hold different Opinions on Religion, London, May 1647.
- Justification by Christ alone a Fountaine of Life and Comfort, London, June 1647; reprinted in William Cudworth's Christ alone exalted, London, 1745; in this work Richardson refers to an earlier publication, The Saint's Desire, and concluded with separate answers to objections of Pierre Huet and Nathaniel Homes to that work; Richardson's tone is here strongly anti-Arminian.
- The Necessity of Toleration in Matters of Religion, London, September 1647; reprinted by the Hanserd Knollys Society in 1846.
- An Answer to the London Ministers' Letter from them to His Excellency and his Counsell of War; as also an Answer to John Geree's Book, intituled "Might overcoming Right", with an Answer to the Book intituled "The Armies' Remembrancer" … also a Discovery of that Learning and Ordination these Ministers have, and the Vanity and Insufficiency thereof …, London, January 1649.
- The Cause of the Poor pleaded, London, 1653; a plea for providing the poor with work.
- An Apology for the present Government and Governour, with an Answer to severall Objections against them, and 20 Queries propounded for those who are unsatisfied to consider, London, September, 1654.
- Plain Dealing, or the unvailing of the Opposers of the Present Government and Governors, in answer of several Things affirmed by Mr. Vavasor Powell, London, 1656.
- A Discourse of the Torments of Hell … with many infallible Proofs that there is not to be a Punishment after this Life for any to endure that shall not end, 1658 and 1660; reprinted in The Phœnix, ii. 427; 4th edit. London, 1754. To this last two answers appeared: John Brandon in Tὸ πῦρ τὸ αἰώνιον, London, 1678, and by Thomas Lewis, in The Nature of Hell, London, 1720.

To Richardson have also been ascribed tentatively An exact and full Relation of all the Proceedings between the Cavaliers and the Northamptonshire Forces at Banbury, January 1643–4, signed R. S.; The King's March with the Scots, and a List of the 3 Lords, … that submit to the Parliament upon the surrender of Newark, London, May 1646; and Oxford agreed to be surrendered to Sir Thomas Fairfax, London, June 1646.

== Notes ==
Attribution

This article incorporates text from a publication now in the public domain: Lee, Sidney, ed. (1896). "Richardson, Samuel (fl.1646)". Dictionary of National Biography. Vol. 48. London: Smith, Elder & Co.
