= John Bradford (dissenting minister) =

English dissenting minister

John Bradford (1750–1805) was an English dissenting minister.

== Life ==
Bradford was born at Hereford, the son of a clothier. He was educated at Hereford grammar school, and at Wadham College, Oxford, where he took the degree of B.A. On leaving college he accepted a curacy at Frilsham in Berkshire, where he married when twenty-eight years of age, and had a family of twelve children. About this time his religious opinions became decidedly Calvinistic, and he preached in several of Lady Huntingdon's chapels. The rector discharged him from his curacy.

Bradford then joined the Countess of Huntingdon's Connexion, and, after spending some time in South Wales, moved to Birmingham, and preached in the old playhouse, which the countess had purchased and made into a chapel for him. Subsequently he left the Connexion for a new chapel in Bartholomew Street, supplementing his small income by making watch-chains. Not successful there, he moved to London in 1797, and preached till his death in the City Chapel, Grub Street.

Bradford died 16 July 1805, and was buried in Bunhill Fields. Some account of his life is given in an octavo volume, chiefly controversial, by his successor, William Wales Horne.

== Works ==
Bradford published:

- The Law of Faith opposed to the Law of Works, Birmingham, 1787 (being an answer to the Baptist circular letter signed Joshua Thomas).
- An Address to the Inhabitants of New Brunswick, Nova Scotia, on the Mission of two Ministers sent by the Countess of Huntingdon, 1788.
- A Collection of Hymns (some of them composed by himself), 1792.
- The Difference between True and False Holiness.
- A Christian's Meetness for Glory.
- Comfort for the Feeble-minded.
- The Gospel spiritually discerned.
- One Baptism.

An octavo edition of Bunyan's Pilgrim's Progress, with Notes by John Bradford, was published in 1792. George Offor regarded the notes as valuable.
