= Richard Gardiner (English divine) =

English Anglican priest

Richard Gardiner (1591–1670) was an English divine.

== Life ==
Gardiner was born in 1591 at or near Hereford, and went to the grammar school of that town. In 1607 he entered Christ Church, Oxford, as a poor scholar, taking the degree of B.A. in 1611, M.A. in 1614, and D.D. in 1630. About this time he took holy orders, and, though he seems to have held no preferment, became known as a brilliant and quaint preacher.

As deputy-orator to the university, some time previous to 1620, he delivered an "eloquent oration" upon James I's gift of his own works to the library. James I, according to Wood, gave to Gardiner the reversion of the next vacant canonry at Christ Church in reward for a speech made before the king "in the Scottish tone". He was accordingly installed in 1629.

In 1630 he was appointed one of the chaplains in ordinary to Charles I. He continued deputy-orator, and in this capacity made the university oration to the king on his return from Edgehill. In 1647 he was examined several times before the parliamentary visitors, and deprived of his prebend.

He lived obscurely at Oxford, befriending poor royalists, until the Restoration, when he was reinstated (July 1660). From this time he devoted all his means to charitable purposes and to the enrichment of the college. Among other benefactions in 1662–5 he gave £510 towards rebuilding parts of Christ Church, and in 1663 he gave lands at Bourton-on-the-Water, Gloucestershire, to the support of two servitors on that foundation. He also erected a fountain in the quadrangle.

He died at Oxford in 1670, aged 79, and was buried in the north choir aisle of Christ Church Cathedral, where a monument to his memory was erected, bearing a laudatory inscription by South, who succeeded him in his prebend.

== Works ==
- "Sermon at St. Paul's Ch. on his Majesty's day of Inauguration", 27 March 1642.
- "Specimen Oratorium", a collection of his official speeches, published in London in 1653, and again in 1657. In 1662 it was reprinted with additions, and republished in 1668 and 1675.
- "Sixteen Sermons preached in the University of Oxford and at Court", 1659; besides several separate sermons.
