= Hereford Cathedral School =

Cathedral school in Herefordshire, England

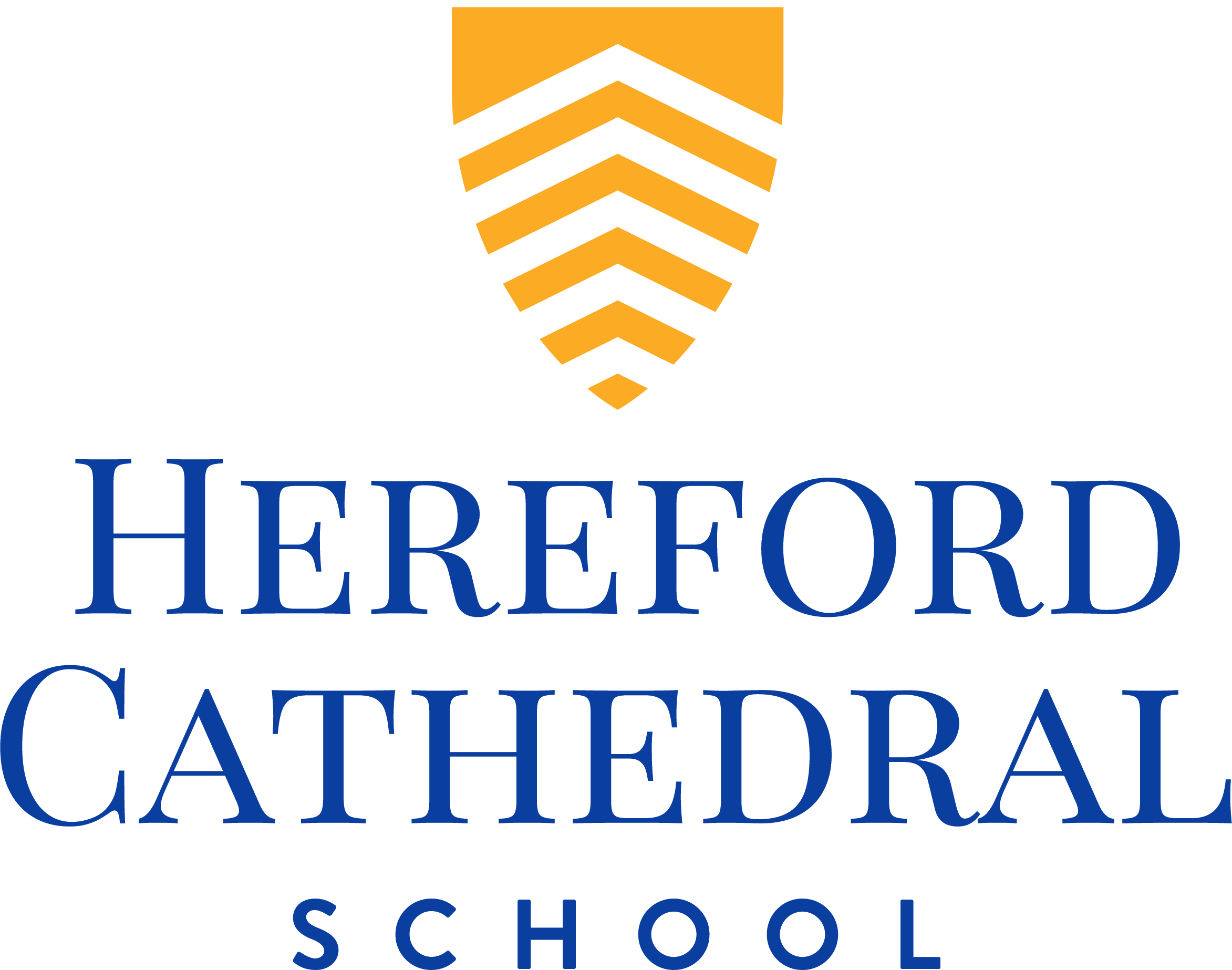

Location
- Old Deanery; Cathedral Close; Hereford, Herefordshire, HR1 2NG; England; 52°03′15″N 2°42′50″W

Information
- Type: Public school Private day and boarding school Cathedral school
- Motto: Floreat Schola Herefordensis (May the school of Hereford flourish)
- Religious affiliation: Church of England
- Established: pre-1384
- President: Sarah Brown
- Chair of Governors: Christian Morgan-Jones
- Headmaster: Michael Gray
- Gender: Mixed
- Age: 3 to 18
- Enrolment: 526
- Houses: Cornwall, Langford, Somerset, Stuart
- Colour
- Publication: The Herefordian; Blue & Gold
- Alumni: Old Herefordians
Scarf
- Website: http://www.herefordcs.com/

Hereford Cathedral School is a private, co-educational boarding and day school for pupils of ages 3 to 18 years, from nursery to sixth form. Its headmaster is a member of the Headmasters' and Headmistresses' Conference. The school's premises are next to Hereford Cathedral in Hereford.

== History ==
There was probably a school associated with the Cathedral from the time of the foundation of the see in the late 7th century. Thus Hereford Cathedral School is likely to be among the oldest in England. The earliest documentary record of its existence dates from 1384 when Bishop John Gilbert appointed Richard de Cornwaille as school master and authorised him to rule over the school with birch and rod. The school's library is named after Bishop Gilbert and Cornwall house is named for Richard de Cornwaille.

During the following centuries the school attracted generous benefactors. It was rebuilt under the reign of King Edward VI, and it received considerable emoluments from Queen Elizabeth I in 1583. During the 17th century Dean Langford, Roger Philpotts, a former Mayor of Hereford, Sarah, dowager Duchess of Somerset (wife of John Seymour, 4th Duke of Somerset), and King Charles I all gave to the school for the foundation of scholarships and the purchase of buildings.

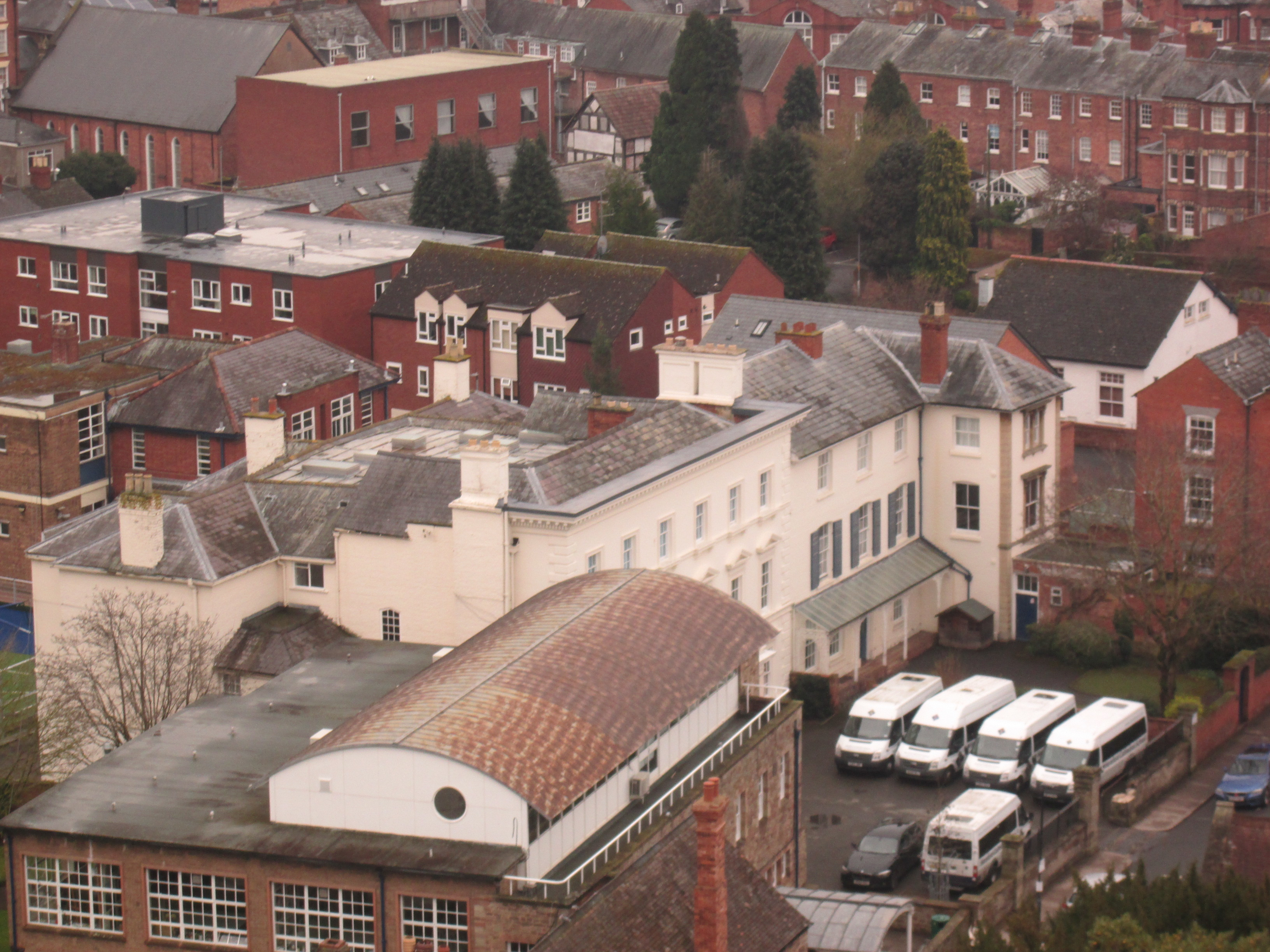
An aerial view of the Portman Centre, No. 1, and the Science Block

By 1762 the school building was once again rebuilt after it had fallen into disrepair and by the mid 19th century teaching was being carried out in the Headmaster's house. In 1875 new class rooms were built in School Yard.

The school remained relatively small in size until the inter-war period. It attained direct grant status in 1945 and by 1970 had expanded to 370 pupils, all of whom were boys and many of whom were boarders. In 1973, the school became co-educational. It was a direct grant school until 1975, and when this scheme was abolished, it chose to become independent. The school also participated in the Assisted Places Scheme from its introduction in 1980 until its abolition in 1997.

As of September 2022, the Headmaster of the school is Dr Michael Gray.

In 2019 Hereford Cathedral School reintroduced boarding for international students, opening a new boarding house in How Caple.

== Junior School ==
Hereford Cathedral Junior School is an independent, co-educational day school for children aged from three to eleven years. The Junior School is part of the Hereford Cathedral Foundation and has been under the aegis of the governors of the Hereford Cathedral School since 1987. Hereford Cathedral Junior School is, like the Senior School, located in Castle Street in the city of Hereford. It occupies an assortment of Medieval and Georgian buildings, ranging from the Grade two star listed No. 28 and the ancient 14th century "Hall of the Vicars Choral", right up to the 21st century RIBA award-winning Moat, which houses the Pre-Prep department. It also shares sports grounds (Wyeside) with the Senior School.

The Junior School was founded in 1898 as a separate preparatory school for boys and moved to its present site in 1925. Since being redesignated as a junior school after it was acquired by Hereford Cathedral School, the Junior School has admitted girls and expanded its pupil numbers and its premises. It now provides a continuous education for boys and girls between the ages of two and eleven. Both schools now share the same governors.

== Curriculum ==
As well as core disciplines, other subjects taught in the school include Ancient History/Classical Civilisation, Art, Business Studies, Design and Technology, Drama, Economics, French, Japanese, Spanish, Greek, Latin, Further Mathematics, Psychology, Music and Textiles.

== Sport ==
Among sports practised in the school are: Athletics, Badminton, Basketball, Canoeing, Cricket, Cross Country, Fencing, Fitness Training, Football, Hockey, Netball, Rounders, Rowing, Rugby, Swimming, Table Tennis, Tennis and Volleyball

== Traditions ==
Every year pupils at the school run a cross-country race called the Hull Cup. The origins of this competition are said to be found with Hereford Cathedral organist Percy Hull who believed that the choristers at the time were in poor shape and so demanded that they take part in an annual run.

Although there is no official school song, the de facto school anthem is the hymn Jerusalem (English Hymnal 656A).

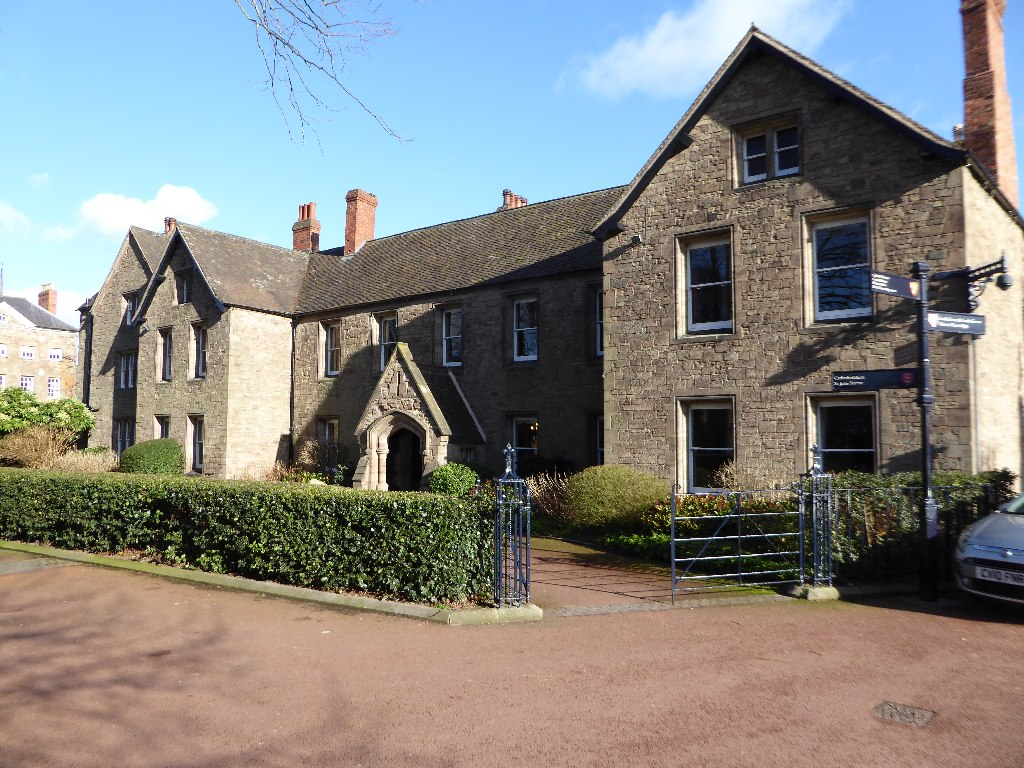
The Old Deanery, once a boarding house, is now the administrative centre of the school.

== Headmasters ==
- 1385 Richardus de Cornwaille
- 1583 – May
- 1590 Thomas Cooxey
- 1595 – Povey
- 1637 Clement Barksdale
- 1669 Richard Gardiner, DD
- 1686 Robert Phillips
- 1687 Thomas Gwillim
- 1689 Richard Treherne
- 1711 John Rodd
- 1731 Thomas Willim
- 1748 John Stephens
- 1749 Richard Traherne
- 1762/3 Reverend Gibbons Bagnall/Thomas Horne
- 1778 Abraham Rudd
- 1784 Robert D. Squire, MA
- 1803 Reverend Samuel Picart, BD
- 1807 Charles Taylor, DD
- 1826 Charles Taylor, Junior, BD
- 1839 William Henry Ley, MA
- 1842 John Wooley, DD
- 1844 Thomas F. Layng, DD
- 1851 Reverend Thomas Barratt Power, MA
- 1857 John Woollam, MA
- 1869 Reverend Eric John Sutherland Rudd, MA
- 1875 Francis Hey Thatham, MA
- 1890 Thomas Thistle, MA
- 1898 Reverend Prebendary William Henry Murray Ragg, MA
- 1913 Reverend John Henson, MA
- 1920 Dr J. H. Crees
- 1940 C. Fairfax-Scott
- 1944 A. F. J. Hopewell
- 1956 W. J. R. Peebles
- 1967 David M. Richards
- 1975 Barry B. Sutton
- 1987 Canon Emeritus Dr Howard C. Tomlinson, BA, PhD, FRHistS
- 2005 Paul Smith, BSc
- 2021 Dr Michael Gray

== Controversy ==
In December 2005 a former teacher, Roger Toll, was jailed for 27 months for setting up a secret camera in one of the school's changing rooms to film girl pupils undressing, and for downloading nearly 900 indecent images of children from the internet.

In November 2010, a former teacher, Neil Moore, was sentenced to 15 months for seducing a male pupil with alcohol at his home after messaging him on a dating website.

In February 2017, the school was sued by a former pupil who alleged that when he was transitioning from female to male, the school discriminated against him. In response, the school's governing body said that the pupil had been withdrawn before any decision on his support had been made.

In July 2020, a former teacher, Colin Wilkes, was convicted on several counts of having sexual activity with a student whilst in a position of trust. The acts occurred over a decade prior.

== Notable alumni ==
Upon leaving the school former pupils and staff are referred to as Old Herefordians (OH) and become members of the Old Herefordians Club. This entitles them to wear the colours of the Old Herefordians Club (navy blue, yellow and white).

Notable Old Herefordians include:

- Denis ApIvor, (1916–2004) Composer
- Harry Shore, Landscaper
- Wilfred Askwith, Bishop of Gloucester
- Martin Baynton, writer and illustrator, creator of Jane and the Dragon books and TV series
- Francis Berry, poet and university professor at Royal Holloway, University of London
- James Bevan, rugby player and first Welsh international captain
- Alan Bruce Blaxland, major-general
- Kate Bliss, antiques expert
- Arthur Boycott, scientist, particularly notable as in 2016 his granddaughter returned a book he borrowed sometime between 1886 and 1894
- John Bradford (dissenting minister), dissenting minister
- John Bull (composer), organist and composer
- John Bury (theatre designer), theatre designer and Tony Award winner
- Henry Bulmer, cider-maker
- Fitzwilliam Coningsby, MP and Royalist leader
- Sir John Cotterell, 1st Baronet, MP and landowner
- David Cox Jr., painter
- Sir Horace Cutler, Conservative politician and leader of the Greater London Council
- David Darg, Oscar nominated film director
- Andrew Davies, politician, formerly Minister for Enterprise, Innovation & Networks
- John Davies of Hereford, writing master and Anglo-Welsh poet
- Geoffrey Dhenin, physician and senior Royal Air Force officer
- John Du Buisson, Dean of St Asaph
- Pete Farndon, (1952–1983) Bass Guitarist of The Pretenders rock group
- Edward Garbett, theologian
- James Garbett, clergyman and Oxford professor of poetry
- Richard Gardiner (English divine), theologian and benefactor
- Peter George (author), author of Red Alert, the inspiration for Stanley Kubrick's Dr. Strangelove
- Richard Gething, writing master
- Michael Goaman, postage stamp designer
- William Gregory, Speaker of the House of Commons
- Silvanus Griffiths, Dean of Hereford Cathedral
- John Guillim, herald
- Matthew Hall, barrister, screenwriter and novelist
- Richard Hancorn (clergyman), clergyman and aristocrat
- John Hardy (composer), composer
- Robert Hollingworth, musician and choral director
- Charles Hopton, Archdeacon of Birmingham
- James Howell, historian, political writer, and first historiographer royal
- Sir Hungerford Hoskyns, 4th Baronet, army officer and MP
- Percy Hull, organist at Hereford Cathedral
- David Keyte, former chairman of Hereford United F.C.
- William Lambe, physician and pioneer of veganism
- Edward William Lane, orientalist
- Thomas Lewis (controversialist), High Church polemicist
- Arthur Machen, supernatural and horror fiction author
- Francis Mansell, Principal of Jesus College, Oxford
- John Mayo (physician), physician
- Richard Newman (priest), Archdeacon of Blackburn
- Howard Nicholls, Welsh rugby player
- Anthony Nuttall, literary critic and academic
- Francis Oakeley, England rugby player
- Sir Michael Parker (event organizer), military officer and organiser of large scale productions, such as the Royal Edinburgh Military Tattoo
- Arthur Peppercorn, Chief Mechanical Engineer of the London North Eastern Railway
- G. H. Pember, theologian
- Jemima Phillips, former Royal Harpist
- William Powell (English actor), 18th century actor
- Harry Ragg, Bishop of Calgary
- E. J. Rapson, numismatist and professor of Sanskrit (1906–36) at the University of Cambridge
- Gordon Rawcliffe, engineering academic
- Heaton Rhodes, New Zealand politician and lawyer
- Owain Richards, entomologist and ecologist
- Peter Richardson (cricketer), England cricketer
- Dick Richardson (cricketer), England cricketer
- David Roberts (diplomat), Ambassador to Syria, the United Arab Emirates, and Lebanon
- John Ross (bishop of Exeter), Georgian Bishop of Exeter
- Alick Rowe, writer
- Daniel Rowland, Welsh Calvinistic Methodist preacher
- Miles Smith, Bishop of Gloucester and translator of the King James Bible
- Philip Wilson Steer OM, impressionist artist
- Noel Symonds, rower
- Richard Symonds-Tayler, admiral
- Paul Thorburn, Welsh rugby international
- Michael Tomlinson, former MP for Mid Dorset and North Poole
- Thomas Traherne (though nothing certain is known about his education before Oxford)
- John Ware (cricketer), cricketer and priest
- Ivor Watkins, Bishop of Guildford
- Frederic Weatherly (1848–1929) Wrote over 3000 popular songs, including "Roses of Picardy", as well as the best-known set of words for "Danny Boy".
- David Williams (crime writer), author
- Arthur Winnington-Ingram (Archdeacon of Hereford), Archdeacon of Hereford
- George Yeld, schoolmaster, explorer, and illustrator

== See also ==
- List of the oldest schools in the United Kingdom
- List of the oldest schools in the world

== Notes ==
- School ISC Reference Number: 80122
- School ISI Reference Number: 6533
- School DfE Reference Number: 884/6004
