= John Ware (cricketer) =

English cricketer (1863–1907)

- Born: 9 January 1863
- Died: 28 November 1907 (aged 44)
- Occupation: Cricketer

John Hubert Ware (9 January 1863 – 28 November 1907) was an English first-class cricketer who played for Oxford University in 1886. He was a righthanded batsman who bowled leg breaks. He was born at Ullingswick, Herefordshire and died at Minehead, Somerset.

Ware was educated at Hereford Cathedral School and Brasenose College, Oxford. He became a Church of England priest and was vicar of East Ham, Essex, from 1892 until his death.
