= HMS Scarborough (1756) =

Post ship of the Royal Navy

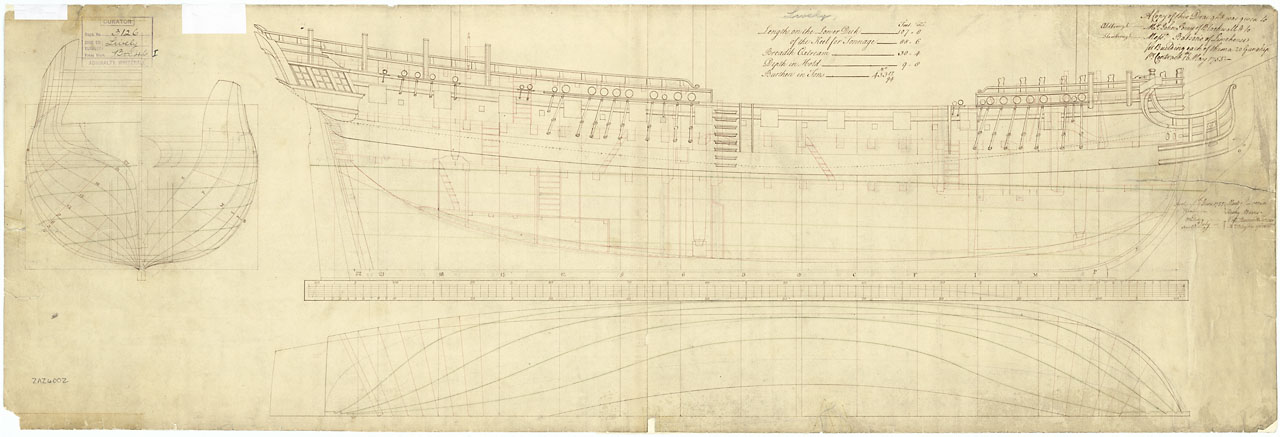
- Ship plan of Scarborough

History

Great Britain
- Name: HMS Scarborough
- Ordered: June 1755
- Builder: Blaydes Yard in Kingston-Upon-Hull
- Laid down: August 1755
- Launched: April 1756
- Fate: sank 5 October 1780 during the Great Hurricane of 1780 off Saint-Domingue in the Caribbean with all hands.

General characteristics
- Class & type: 22-gun 6th rate
- Sail plan: Full-rigged ship

HMS Scarborough was a 20-gun post ship of the Royal Navy built in 1756 which served until 1780. She had a crew of 160 men.

== Service ==
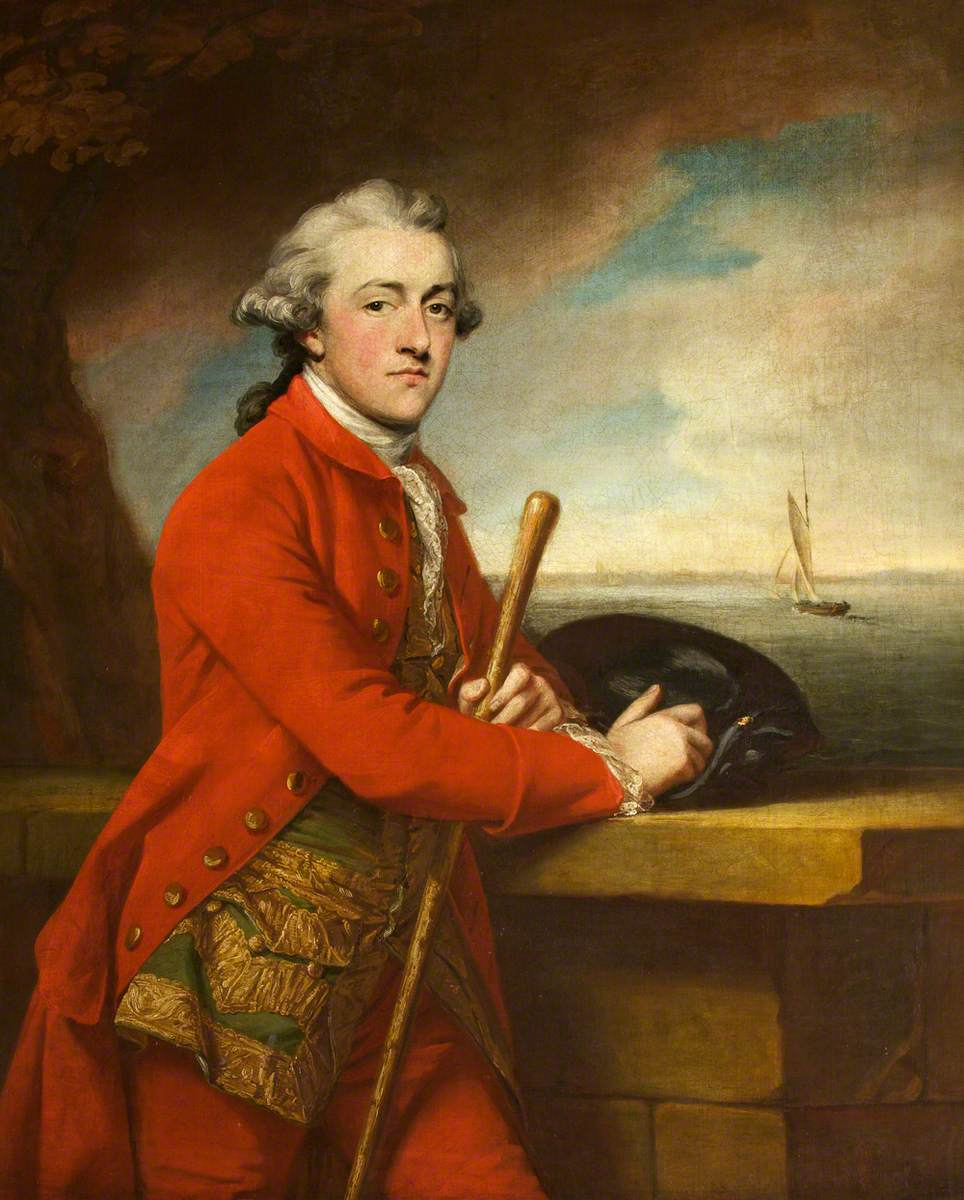
c. 1760 portrait of Robert Boyle Nicholas with his yacht Nepaul by Francis Cotes

She was ordered in June 1755 and was built at Blaydes Yard in Kingston-Upon-Hull over a period of around 9 months at a cost of £3400. She was designed by Sir Thomas Slade. She was launched in April 1756 under command of Captain Robert Routh. In September 1757 she sailed for North America as part of the Seven Years' War. In May 1758 she captured the American ship Echo off Louisburg and in June took part in the Siege of Louisburg. In 1759 she was posted to Quebec and was involved in the Battle of Quebec under command of Captain John Stott.

In 1760 she returned to Louisburg then went north to Newfoundland where she took place in the Battle of Chaleur Bay on 8 July, where 4 British ships defeated three French ships, still under command of Stott.

She returned to England for some years then set off in August 1762 for America and the Leeward Islands. In 1765 she underwent a major refit at Deptford and was recommissioned in November 1766 under command of Captain Robert Gregory, taking her to the Leeward Islands in April 1767 staying until 1769. She then had three years of inactivity before a major refit at Chatham Docks. She was relaunched in June 1774 under command of Captain James Chads who sailed her to Boston (in the aftermath of the Boston Tea Party).

In October 1774 she returned to England under command of Captain Andrew Barkley. She stayed only briefly and later in October left Plymouth carrying dispatches to Boston arriving on 3 December. They anchored at Piscataqua River and on New Year's Eve 1774/5 hosted governor John Wentworth in their celebrations. On 1 June, 1777 she captured vessel "St. Barbary", On 21 june "McPherson" off the coast of New England, and on 23 June recaptured "Generous Friend". On 20 October, 1777 she captured "Beverly" off the coast of Nova Scotia. On 12 October, 1777 she, or a ship named Scarboro, captured schooner "Lucy" on the Grand Banks. She remained in America under Barkley until 1779, concerning various issues relating to the Revolutionary War, but was finally paid off in April 1779 when she was fitted with a copper bottom at Chatham at a cost of £4267 (more than her original total cost).

She set off to the Leeward Islands under Captain Robert Boyle Nicholas on 22 May 1780. In August 1780 Captain Samuel Hood Walker took command. He was lost with the ship and crew on 5 October 1780 during the Great Hurricane of 1780 off Saint-Dominigue in the Caribbean.

== Other Notable Crew ==
- Alexander Fraser served as acting lieutenant in 1774 under Captain Barkley.
