= Francis Oakeley =

England international rugby union player (1891-1914)

Francis Eckley Oakeley
- Born: 5 February 1891
- Died: 25 November 1914 (aged 23); North Sea
- Education: Hereford Cathedral School
- Military career
- Allegiance: United Kingdom
- Branch: Royal Navy
- Unit: HMS D2
- Conflicts: World War I

Rugby union career
- Position: scrum-half
International career
Years	Team	Apps	(Points)
1913-1914	England	4	

Francis Eckley Oakeley (5 February 1891 – 25 November 1914) was an English rugby player. Having been educated at Hereford Cathedral School, he later played as a scrum-half and won four caps for England between 1913 and 1914. He was killed during the First World War, when the submarine he was serving aboard, HMS D2, disappeared.
