= Guy Shuttleworth =

English cricketer (1926–2021)

Personal information
- Full name: Guy Mitchell Shuttleworth
- Born: 6 November 1926; Blackburn, Lancashire, England
- Died: 21 January 2021 (aged 94); Eastbourne, East Sussex, England
- Batting: Right-handed

Domestic team information
- Years: Team
- 1946–1948: Cambridge University

Career statistics
Competition	First-class
Matches	25
Runs scored	786
Batting average	23.11
100s/50s	0/3
Top score	96
Balls bowled	–
Wickets	–
Bowling average	–
5 wickets in innings	–
10 wickets in match	–
Best bowling	–
Catches/stumpings	7/–
- Source: Cricinfo, 14 December 2018

Guy Mitchell Shuttleworth (6 November 1926 – 21 January 2021) was a cricketer who played first-class cricket for Cambridge University from 1946 to 1948. He was also a football player, and became a teacher.

== Life and career ==
Shuttleworth attended Queen Elizabeth's Grammar School, Blackburn, before going up to King's College, Cambridge. His highest score in first-class cricket was 96 for Cambridge against Sussex in 1948, when he and Doug Insole added 171 for the sixth wicket in two hours. He played for East Lancashire in the Lancashire League from 1944 to 1950 and played eight matches for Lancashire 2nd XI from 1946 to 1948.

Shuttleworth was also a soccer player, winning a Blue at Cambridge and later playing for Corinthian-Casuals F.C. In 1949 he won an amateur international cap for England.

He became a schoolmaster, teaching at St Peter's School, York, where he was head of the mathematics department from 1957, when he joined the school, until his retirement in 1989, and also housemaster of the boarding house The Manor between 1969 and 1981. The school now awards an annual Guy Shuttleworth Cup for attitude and effort in sport.

Shuttleworth died at the age of 94 on 21 January 2021. He and his wife Tanya had a son and a daughter. One of their grandchildren is the Chelsea and England international footballer Ben Chilwell.
