= St Peter's School, York =

Public school in York, England

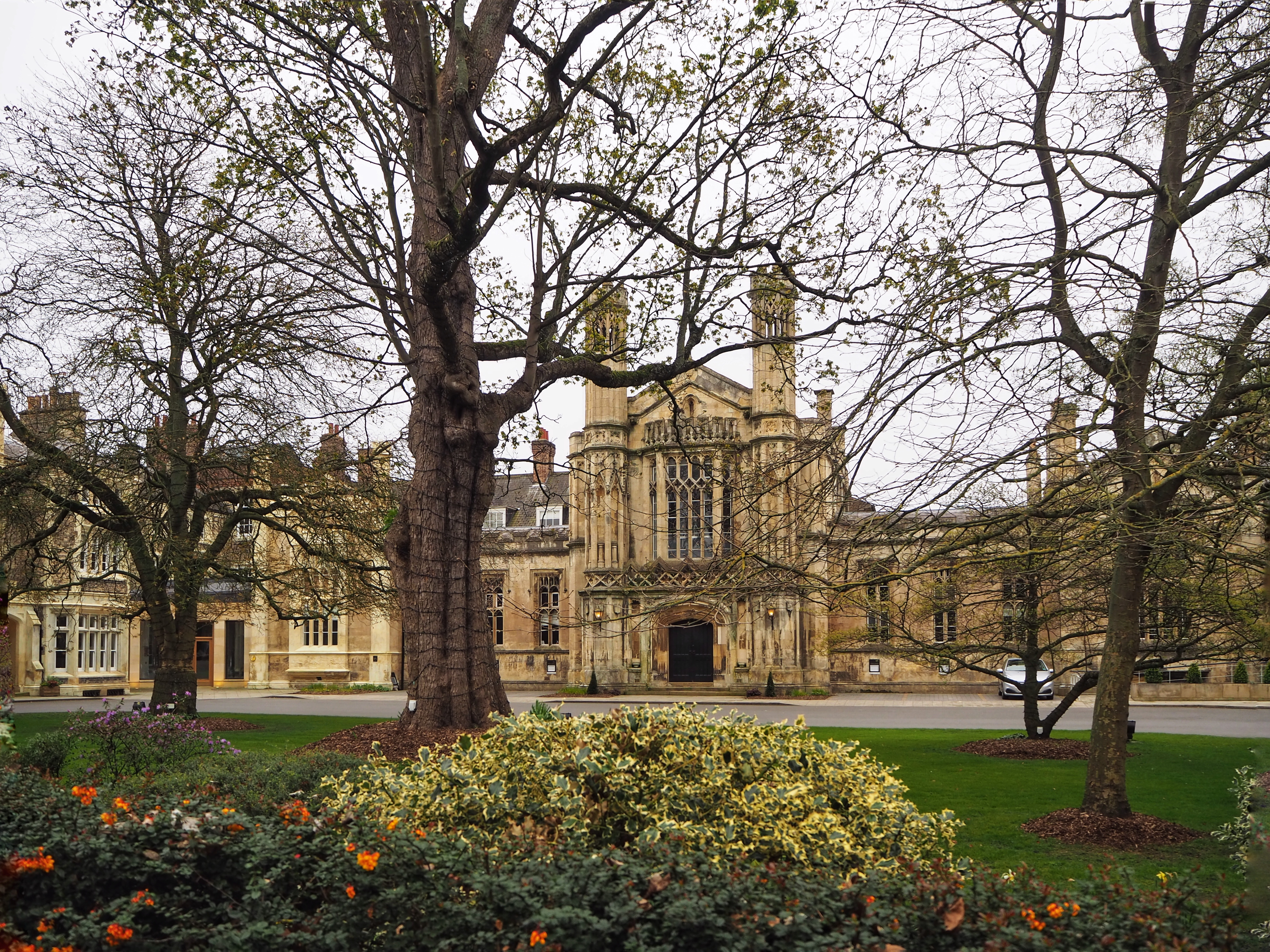

Location
- St Peter's; Clifton; York, North Yorkshire, YO30 6AB; England; 53.966418°N 1.092850°W

Information
- Type: Public school Private day and boarding
- Motto: Super Antiquas Vias ("Over ancient ways")
- Religious affiliation: Church of England
- Established: AD 627; 1399 years ago
- Founder: St Paulinus of York
- Local authority: City of York Council
- Department for Education URN: 121724 Tables
- Headmaster: Jeremy Walker
- Gender: Co-educational
- Age: 2 to 18
- Enrolment: c. 1,300
- Houses: 10
- Colours: Brown, Blue, White
- Alumni: Old Peterites
- Website: https://www.stpetersyork.org.uk/

St Peter's School is a co-educational public school in the English city of York for pupils aged 2–18. The school is considered to be the third-oldest school in the world, founded in 627 by St Paulinus of York alongside York Minster. It is part of the Headmasters' and Headmistresses' Conference and York Boarding Schools Group.

== History ==
=== Founding ===
St. Peter's School was reputedly founded by St Paulinus of York in AD 627. It originally operated in the grounds of York Minster, until the Dissolution of the Monasteries, where in AD 1540, St Mary's Abbey, York, was seized by the king. This prompted the re-endowment and relocation of the school to a place outside the city walls known as The Horsefair. According to David Palliser however, St Peter's was instead founded as a new school. This is due to this statement from Archbishop Holgate, where he declares the following:

"We will and command that the Deacons, not applienge themselves to the Gramer Scole (grammar school) daylie… be expulsed, and other called to ther rowne and office."(YCS 1900, 74–5)

Older historians such as AF Leach and Angelo Raine suggest that the "grammar school" referenced is St. Peter's, thus proving it was still operational during that period, although Palliser suggests it is likely Archbishop Holgate's School instead.During this period three conspirators in the 1605 Gunpowder Plot, Guy Fawkes, John Wright, and Christopher Wright, attended the school.

=== 16th Century onwards ===
During the English Civil War, the school in the Horsefair was destroyed by the Siege of York. As a result, the school site was moved to the Bedern within the city walls before moving again, in 1730, to St Andrewgate and in 1840 to the Minster Yard. It was only in 1844 that the present site was purchased and the school relocated for the final time.

For most of its history, the school was a boys' school, but welcomed girls into the sixth form from 1976 before becoming fully coeducational in 1987.

== Campus ==
The school grounds are located near the centre of York and stretch to the banks of the River Ouse. The main front of the school faces along Bootham; this is the oldest part of the site, including the hall range designed by John Harper (1838), chapel (1861), and library (1894).

Boarding Houses Wentworth and Rise border the main campus, while Linton, Dronfield and The Manor are located across the road from the main school front accessible by footbridge. In the 2000s the school expanded its site under Headmaster Andrew Trotman to include the new lower campus, formerly the site of Queen Anne's, a state school that had been recently closed. The move was not without its challenges, including the distance between the old and new sites and the dissection of a public footpath. The addition of the lower campus brought the school's holdings to 50 acres.

== Structure ==
St Peter's School consists of a pre-prep, prep school and senior section:

=== St Peter's 2–8 ===
St Peter's 2–8 (formerly Clifton Pre-preparatory School) is the pre-prep school to St Peter's School, York. St Peter's 2–8 is located on the Upper Campus of the school, next door to the senior school which runs along the main road of Bootham in the centre of York. The current head of St Peter's 2–8 is Antonia Clarke.

In February 2018, Clifton School and Nursery was named as the best pre-prep/prep school in the annual TES Independent School Awards.

In summer 2020 Clifton Pre-Preparatory School and Nursery was renamed St Peter's 2–8 and, in April 2021, St Peter's 2–8 was named the best pre-prep school and independent school of the year in the annual TES Independent School Awards.

=== St Peter's 8–13 ===
St Peter's 8–13 (formerly St Olave's School) is the junior school to St Peter's, with grounds on the banks of the River Ouse. The current head of St Peter's 8–13 is Phil Hardy.

St Olave's was founded by Reverend Henry Andrew Wilson in 1876 and named after its original site of St Olave’s House in Marygate. The school was acquired by St Peter's School in 1901 and St Olave's was renamed St Peter's 8–13 in 2020.

In September 2001, St Olave's moved from the White House (the Chilman Building), and its half of the Queen's Building, to the newly acquired Queen Anne site. The pre-prep, St Peter's 2–8 (formerly Clifton Prep) moved from its original 19th-century building on The Avenue to occupy the buildings previously used by St Olave's.

St Peter's 8–13 is now located on the Lower Campus of the St Peter's School, which is also home to the senior school Biology and Art Departments.

== Extra-curricular activities ==
=== Sport ===
Activities at the school include rugby, hockey, netball, tennis, cricket, rowing, athletics, basketball, badminton, cross-country, climbing, squash, swimming, weight training, trampolining, water polo and aerobics. The school has sporting fields, gymnasiums, an indoor swimming pool, two multi-sport indoor centres, tennis courts, multi-use astroturf pitches, a rifle range, and a boathouse.

For 27 years, cricket was coached by Keith Mohan. In 2024, the school won the national schools' T20 Cricket competition after defeating Millfield School at Lord's.

In 2002 the school's U15 rugby team won the national Daily Mail Cup competition and the U18 team were narrowly beaten in 2005 in the final against Exeter College, Exeter. In 2011 the U16 team won the UCLAN Northern Schools Floodlit Competition and in 2019 the U16 sevens team won the national Rosslyn park competition. Since World War II, the school has had four unbeaten seasons in rugby.

St Peter's School Boat Club was founded in 1851 and is one of the oldest school rowing clubs in the world. It has had success at international level with over 28 GB 'vests' earned by Peterites since 1998. The school 1st VIII first competed at Henley Royal Regatta in 1968 and has competed in both the Princess Elizabeth and the Fawley. The school has won nine medals at The National Schools' Regatta, 12 medals at The National Championships and had 25 appearances at Henley (both Men's and Women's), all since 1991.

The school's Combined Cadet Force developed from the OTC established at the school in 1913. The school's shooting contingent placed in the top three teams of the Marling Challenge Cup at Bisley Imperial meeting five times during the 1960s alone, winning twice, while the highest placing in the Ashburton was third in 1971.

The first recorded inter-school Squash match was held between Haileybury and St Peter's in the run up to the first Drysdale Cup. The school won the public schools' squash (then the Drysdale Cup) twice and came second three times.

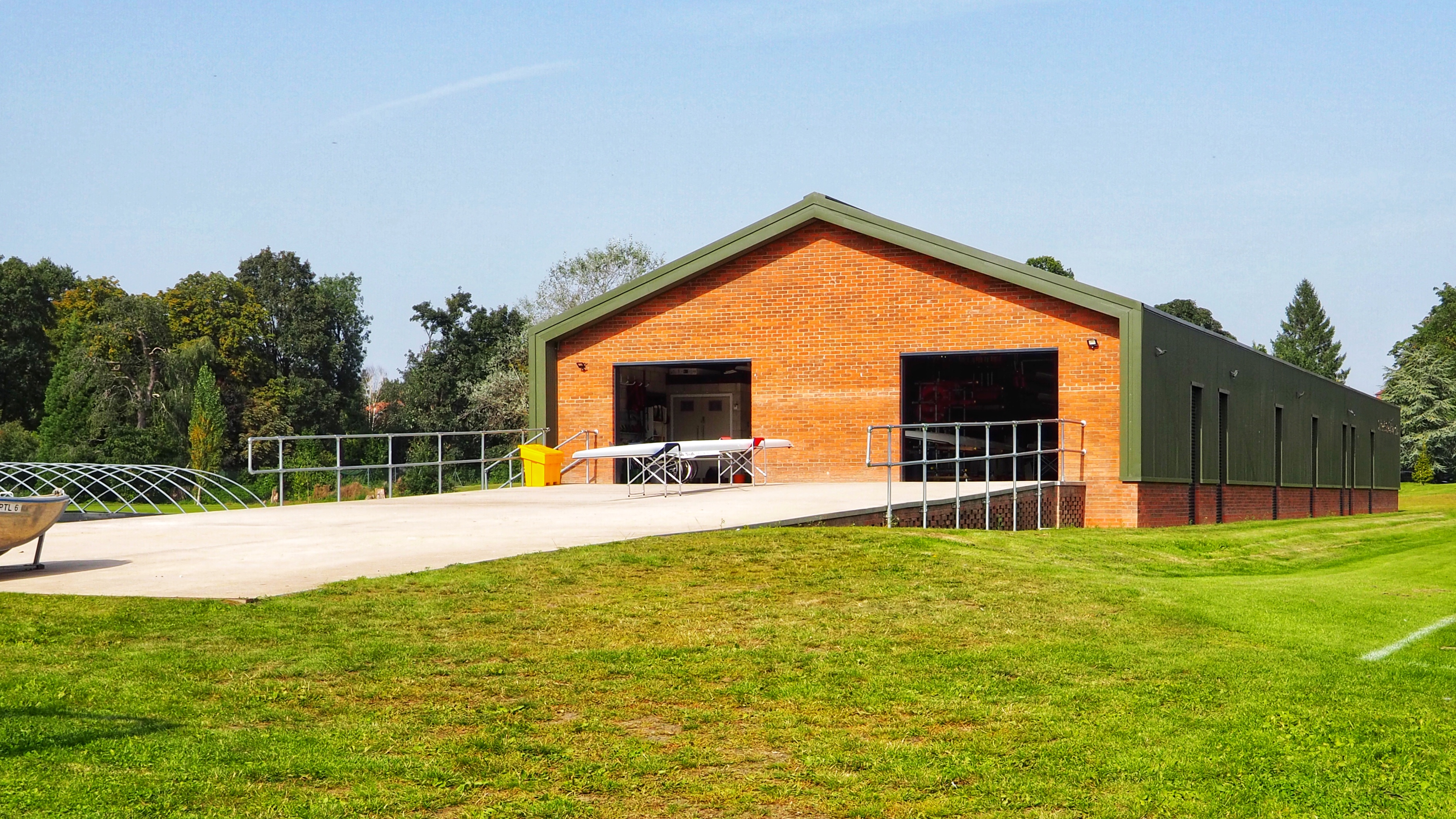
St Peter’s School Boathouse on the River Ouse

=== Music ===
The School Choir averages over 150 members a year, but there is also a more selective Chapel Choir as well as an elite Chamber Choir. Highlights of the choral calendar include the Carol Service at York Minster, as well as Evensongs at the Minster and elsewhere including regular Evensongs at St Paul’s Cathedral and Westminster Abbey.

The school has Barbershop Quartets, a Brass Group, Chamber Groups, a Choral Society, a Close Harmony Group, String Orchestras, String Quartets, Swing Band/Traditional Jazz, a Symphony Orchestra, Senior Wind Band, Woodwind, Quintets and Quartets.

After the closure of The Minster School, York, in 2019, St Peter's 8–13 is now the choir school for the York Minster Choristers.

== Houses ==
The houses of the school with its respective colour is listed below:

=== Boarding houses (boys) ===
- Linton – Baby blue
- The Manor – Gold

=== Boarding houses (girls) ===
- Dronfield – Pink
- Rise – White

=== Day houses (mixed) ===
- Clifton – Yellow
- The Grove – Red
- Queens – Purple
- Temple – Green
- School – Maroon
- Hope – Orange

The house system is a long-standing tradition throughout the school's history. Each house has a physical location, located in various buildings and parts of buildings throughout the school campus.

== Religion ==
The school has a Chapel with compulsory services three mornings a week. Eucharist is also held once a term and there are special services to mark Festivals in the Christian calendar. A service is held on Remembrance Sunday during which all pupils place poppies on the book of remembrance in the Ante-chapel (which contains names of alumni killed in conflict). The school's Christmas Carol Service is held in York Minster.

Religious education is compulsory at the school until Sixth Form, and is taught by both academic staff and the school's two Church of England clergy.

=== York Minster ===
York Minster has a long connection with St Peter's, as the school's founder was an Archbishop of York. This relationship is also evident in the school's name, which mirrors the formal title of the Minster, The cathedral and Metropolitical Church of St Peter. At its foundation, the school was probably housed next to the earliest cathedral building.

At the end of each academic year a commemoration and prizegiving service is held in the minster and a carol service is also held there at Christmas. The school choir often sings concerts in the minster.

St Peter’s School is the home of York Minster’s choristers, following the closure of the Minster School in 2020.

== Traditions ==
- Eucharist – a whole school Eucharist service takes place each term and at other significant Christian festivals.
- 5 November – on Guy Fawkes Night, the school does not partake in the common tradition of burning a 'Guy' on the bonfire, as Guy Fawkes was an Old Peterite (alumnus). There is, however, a tradition of putting on a firework display for the boarders.

== Controversies ==
=== Footpath closure (2006) ===
In 2006, St Peter's School closed a public footpath running through the school grounds using The Countryside and Rights of Way Act 2000. This was disputed by local people.

=== Initiation Rituals ===
In 2018 a former pupil reported in The Times that boys were subjected to humiliating and painful initiation rituals such as being shot with BB guns, hit in their genitalia with pool cues, and locked in closed spaces for hours at a time. The same pupil also reported being waterboarded with Listerine. Alistair Dunn, the school's acting headmaster, said in response that "St Peter's is a caring and nurturing school and initiation rites are unacceptable."

=== Sexual Abuse ===
Thomas Marriott, who taught history and rowing at St Peter's for four years, was found guilty in 2023 of three counts of sexual abuse of a pupil at the school.

== Headmasters ==
Headmasters
- Paulinus 627
- James, The Deacon 630–660
- Wilfrid I 668
- Bosa 691
- John of Beverley 705
- Wilfrid II 718
- Egbert 732
- Albert 766
- Alcuin 778–782
- Laurentius Sirius 1094
- Robert 1120
- Murdach 1130
- Gwydo 1140
- Walter de Nessam 1266
- Alexander of York 1350
- John of York 1368
- Walter Heriez 1397
- John de Rishton 1400
- John Brockholes 1410
- John Saxton 1426
- John Marshall 1426
- W. Marshall 1426
- Gilbert Pinchbeck 1426
- Master Gilbert 1453
- Roger Lewsay 1457
- John Hamundson 1465
- John Gylliott 1484
- James Sheffield 1486
- Christopher Holdsworth 1531
- Master Amler 1535 (Royal Charter)
- Rev. John Fletcher 1565
- Rev. William James 1575
- Rev. John Pulleyn 1576
- Rev. John Bayles 1590
- Rev. Canon William Thomas 1595
- Rev. John Johnson 1614
- Rev. Christopher Wallis 1638
- Rev. William Langley 1660
- William Thomlinson 1679
- Rev. W. Herbert 1711
- Rev. Zachariah Blake 1726
- Rev. John Blake 1757
- Rev. John Robinson 1784
- Rev. Isaac Grayson 1793
- Rev. Stephen Creyke 1827
- Rev. William Hewson 1838
- Rev. Archdeacon William Hey 1844
- Rev. Richard Elwyn 1864
- Rev. Henry M. Stephenson 1872
- Rev. George T. Handford 1887
- Rev. Edward C. Owen 1900
- Stanley M. Toyne 1913
- Aubrey J. Price 1936
- John Dronfield 1937
- Peter D. R. Gardiner 1967
- Peter Hughes 1980
- David Cummin 1984
- Robin Pittman 1985
- Andrew Trotman 1995
- Richard Smyth 2004
- Leo Winkley 2010
- Jeremy Walker 2019

== Notable teachers ==
Notable teachers
- Miggy Biller
- Lowther Clarke
- David Kirby
- Keith Mohan
- Charles Patteson
- Guy Shuttleworth
- Richard Spruce
- Allan Wicks
- Benny Wilson
- George Yeld

== Notable alumni ==
The school has educated at least 19 members of Parliament (including a chancellor and Secretary of Defence), 9 bishops, and numerous academics, authors, composers, cricketers, and actors. Below is an abridged list; a more complete listing can be found at the category link above.

=== Academia ===
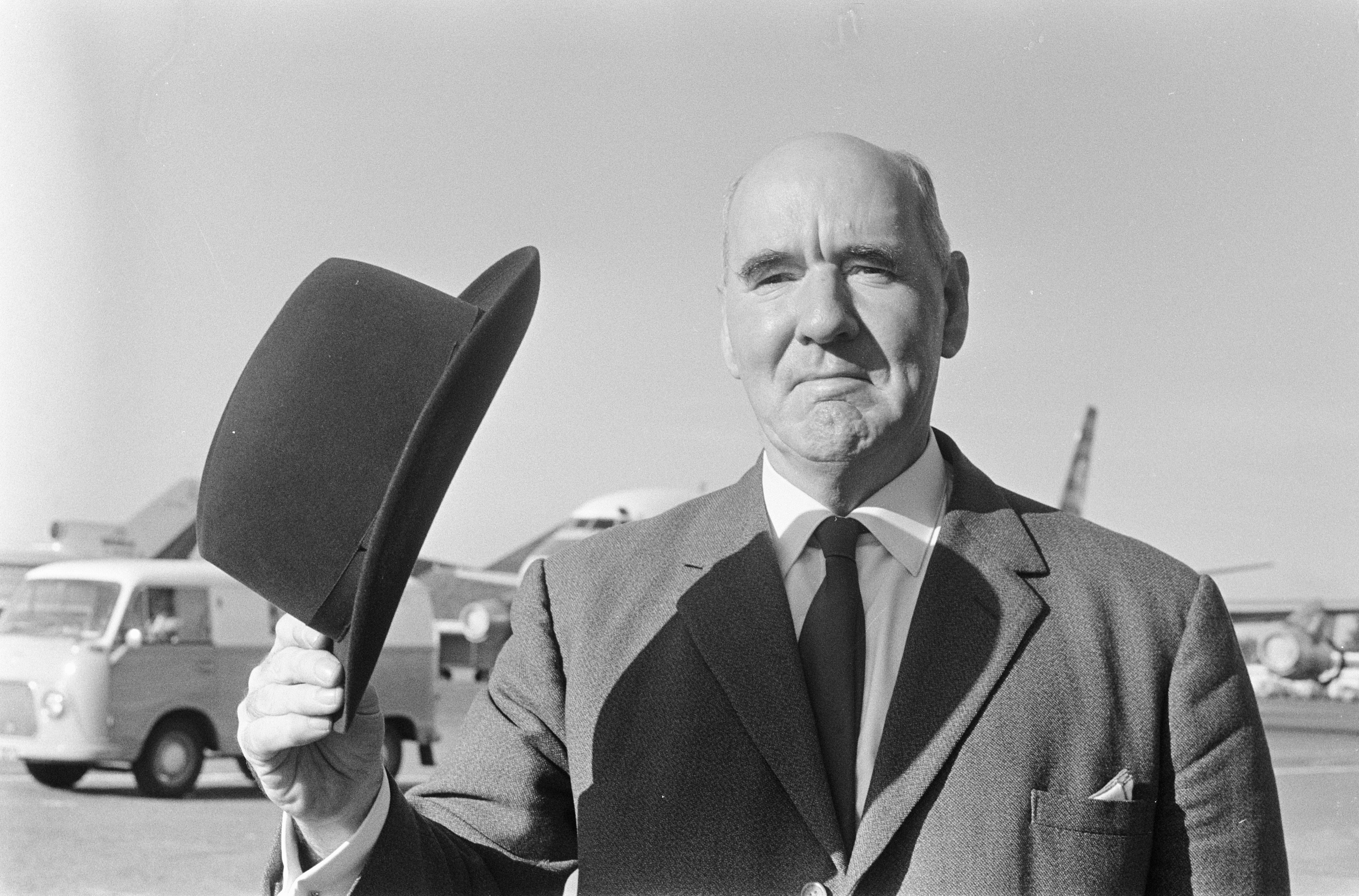
Cyril Northcote Parkinson, Historian famous for Parkinson's Law

- Sir Clifford Allbutt FRS – Regius Professor of Physic at Cambridge and President of the BMA.
- Frederick Henry Marvell Blaydes – Classicist.
- Angus M. Bowie, Classicist and Fellow of Queen’s College, Oxford
- Henry Dodwell – Anglo-Irish Writer, Theologian, and Camden Professor of Ancient History at Oxford.
- William Fishburn Donkin FRS– Savilian Professor of Astronomy and Fellow of University College, Oxford.
- Sir Michael Ferguson FRS – Regius Professor of Life Sciences at the University of Dundee.
- Edmund William Gilbert – Professor of Geography and Fellow of Hertford College, Oxford.
- Christopher Hill – Marxist Historian and Master of Balliol College, Oxford. Fellow of All Souls College, Oxford.
- Conyers Middleton – Woodwardian Professor of Geology and Fellow of Trinity College, Cambridge.
- James Motley – Mining engineer, botanist, and natural historian.
- Henry Darnley Naylor – Professor of Classics at the University of Adelaide.
- C. Northcote Parkinson – Professor of History at the University of Malaya and Author of Parkinson's Law.
- E. Peter Raynes FRS – Professor of Optoelectronic Engineering and Fellow of St Cross College, Oxford.
- Arnold William Reinold FRS – Physicist and Fellow of Merton College, Oxford.
- Charles Robinson – Master of St Catharine’s College, Cambridge.
- Richard Sharpe – Professor of Diplomatic at Oxford and Fellow of Wadham College.
- Paul Thompson – Professor of Neurology at the University of Southern California.
- John Francis Walker – Natural Scientist and Fellow of Sidney Sussex College, Cambridge.

=== Arts and media ===
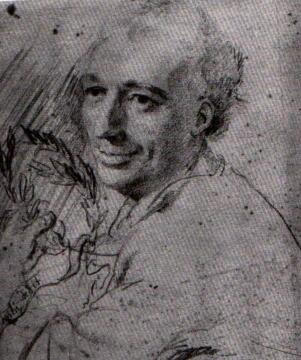
Laurence Eusden, Poet Laureate

- Gareth Barlow – Television Presenter for BBC and Sky News.
- John Barry OBE – Oscar and Grammy Winning Film Composer best known for composing 11 James Bond soundtracks.
- Katherine Downes – BBC Television Presenter.
- Jeffery Dench – Shakespearean Actor.
- Laurence Eusden – Poet laureate.
- Harry Gration MBE – Broadcaster with the BBC.
- Alan Gray – Composer and organist.
- Charles Legh Naylor – Composer and organist.
- Basil Radford – Actor in The Lady Vanishes and other Hitchcock Films known for Charters and Caldicott.
- Jimmy Thompson – Actor, writer, and director.
- Greg Wise – Actor in The Crown and Sense and Sensibility.

=== Historical figures ===
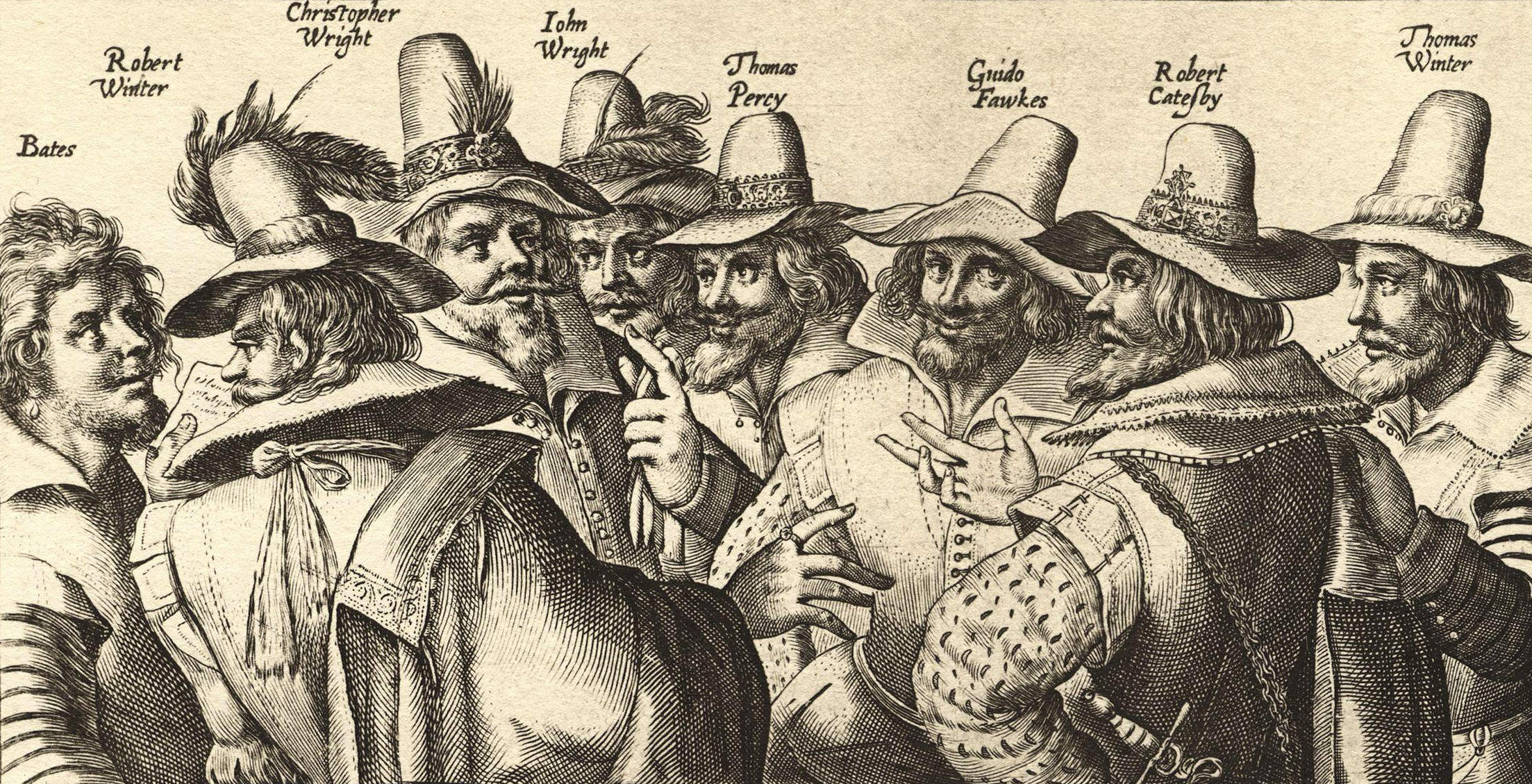
Guy Fawkes and John and Christopher Wright, Gunpowder Plotters

- Guy Fawkes – Conspirator in the Gunpowder Plot.
- Sir Thomas Herbert, 1st Baronet – Gentleman of the Bedchamber to Charles I.
- Robert Middleton – Catholic Martyr. Beatified 1987.
- Charles Hudson – Mountaineer known for the First Ascent of the Matterhorn.
- Edward Oldcorne – Catholic Martyr executed in association with the Gunpowder Plot. Beatified 1929.
- Oswald Tesimond – Jesuit Clergyman associated with the Gunpowder Plot.
- Christopher Wright – Conspirator in the Gunpowder Plot.
- John Wright – Conspirator in the Gunpowder Plot.

=== Military ===
- Ian Baker CBE – Assistant chief of the General Staff.
- Frank Bingham – First class cricketer for Derbyshire and Army officer who died in World War I.
- Sir Lancelot Cutforth – Major-general.
- Walbanke Ashby Pritt – World War I Flying ace credited with five aerial victories.
- Craig Lawrence CBE – Former director of Joint Warfare.
- Sir Neill Malcolm – Second World War chief of staff in the Fifth Army.
- Sir Charles Medhurst – Air chief marshal and commander-in-chief of RAF Mediterranean and Middle Eastern Command.

=== Politics, Law, and Business ===
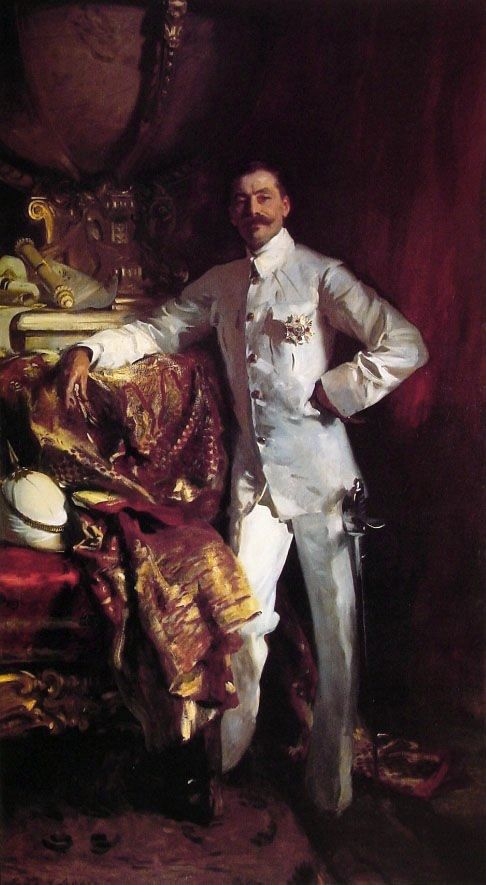
Sir Frank Swettenham, Governor of British Malaya

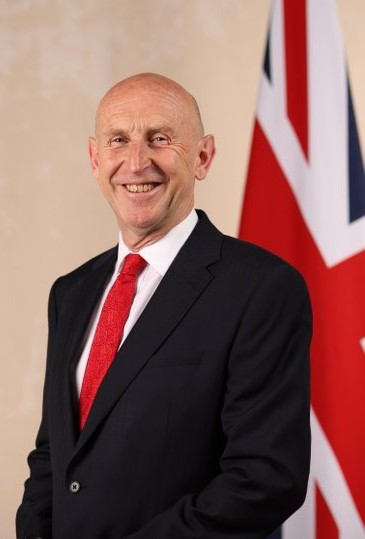
John Healey, Chancellor of the Exchequer

- John Aislabie – British MP and Chancellor of the Exchequer.
- John Chapman Andrew – New Zealand MP and Fellow of Wadham College, Oxford.
- Neil Carmichael – British Conservative MP.
- Sir Thomas Cheke – English MP.
- James Clappison – British Conservative MP.
- Geoffrey Hugh Dodsworth – British Conservative MP.
- John Healey – British Labour MP and Chancellor of the Exchequer.
- Nicholas Hopton – British ambassador to Yemen, Iran, and Libya.
- John Arthur Jackson – British Conservative MP.
- Joseph Johnson Leeman – British Liberal MP.
- Noel Lindsay – British Conservative MP.
- Alan Mak – British Conservative MP.
- Sir Ian Malcolm – British Conservative MP.
- John Mortimer OBE – Judge of the Hong Kong Court of Final Appeal and President of the Court of Appeal of Brunei Darussalam.
- Frank Pick – Transport Administrator of the London Passenger Transport Board.
- Edward Pickersgill – British Liberal MP.
- Luke Robinson – English MP and Member of the Council of State.
- Sir John Rodgers, 1st Baronet – British Conservative MP.
- Richard Shaw – British Liberal MP.
- Sir Frank Swettenham – British Colonial Official.
- Sir Solomon Swale, 1st Baronet – English MP.
- Sir Joseph Terry – Confectioner and Industrialist.
- James Wharton, Baron Wharton of Yarm – British Conservative Peer.

=== Religion ===
- George Forrest Browne – Disney Professor of Archaeology at Cambridge and Bishop of Bristol.
- Maurice Harland – Bishop of Durham.
- Lyth, John – Methodist preacher and author, first Wesleyan missionary to Germany
- Thomas Morton – Bishop of Durham.
- William Pope – Clergyman and Follower of the Oxford Movement.
- Henry Herbert Williams – Bishop of Carlisle and Principal of St Edmund Hall, Oxford.

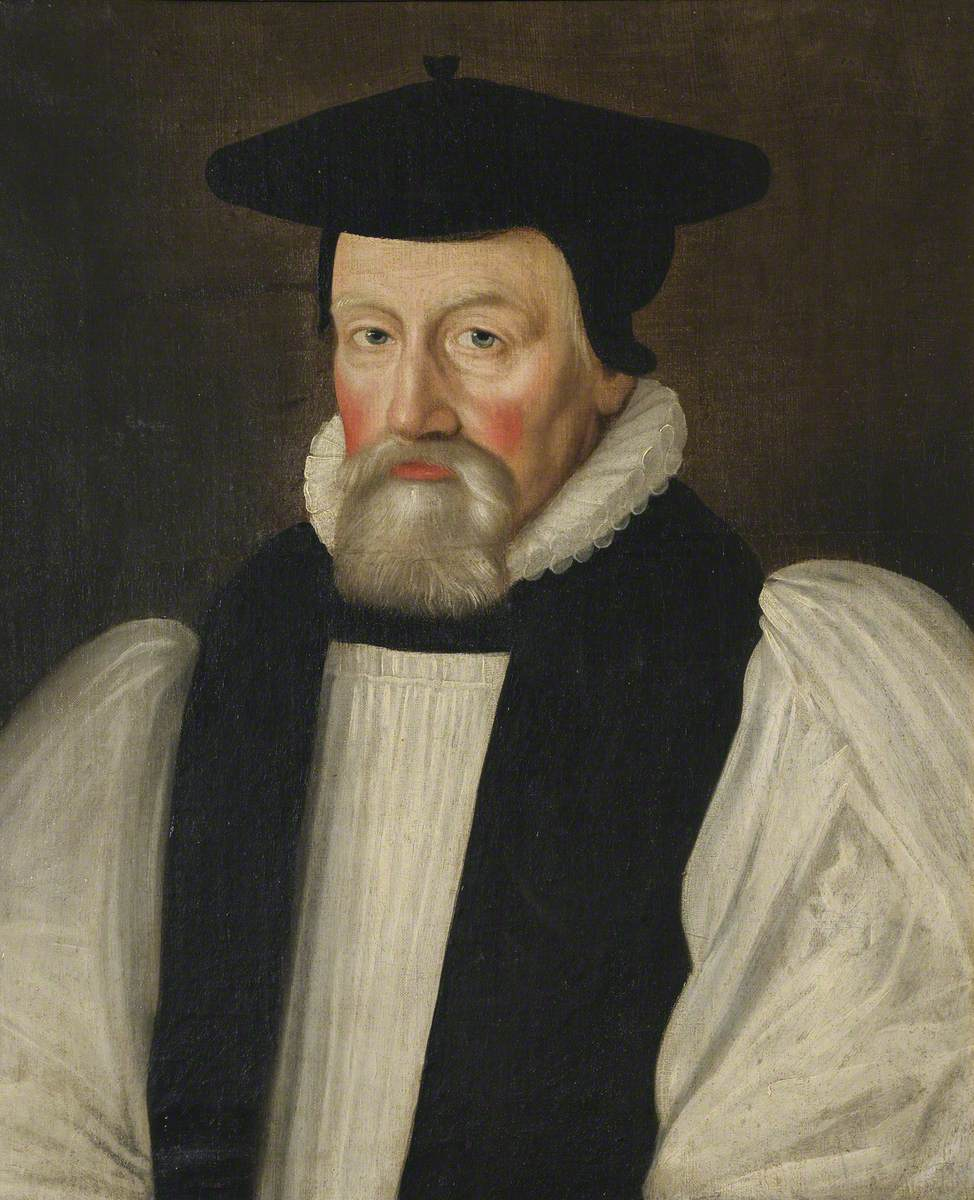
Thomas Morton, Bishop of Durham

=== Sport ===
- Jonny Bairstow – First Class Cricketer for Yorkshire and England.
- Stephen Coverdale – First Class Cricketer for Cambridge University and Yorkshire.
- Sam Dickinson – British Olympic Triathlete.
- Rachel Hirst – British Olympic Rower.
- Leslie Hood – British Olympic Rugby Player.
- David Kirby – First Class Cricketer for Cambridge University and Leicestershire.
- Frank Mitchell – First Class Cricketer for Cambridge University, Yorkshire, and England.
- James Thompson (racing driver) – auto racing Driver and Commentator for Eurosport.
- Norman Yardley – First Class Cricketer for Cambridge University, Yorkshire, and England; England Captain.

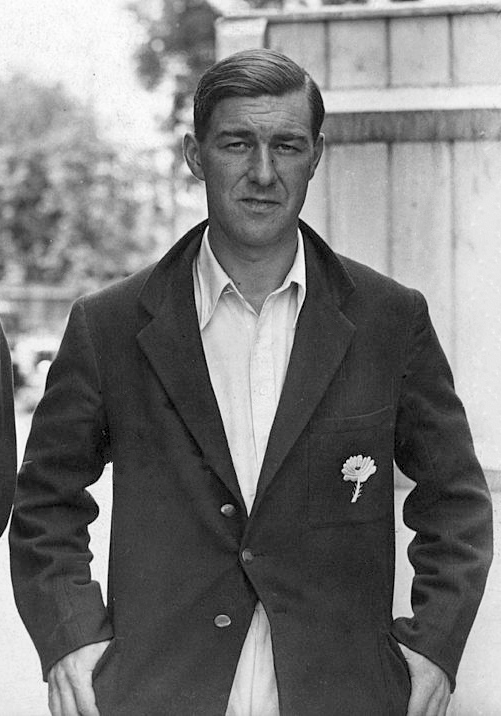
Norman Yardley, England Cricket Captain

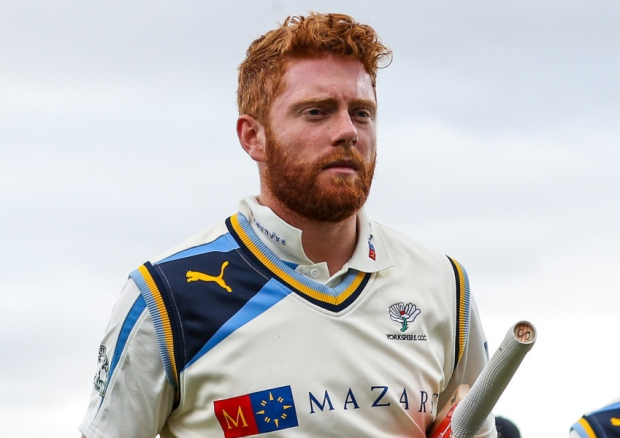
Jonny Bairstow, England Cricketer

== See also ==
- List of the oldest schools in the United Kingdom
- List of the oldest schools in the world
- List of Boarding Schools in the United Kingdom
- Headmasters' and Headmistresses' Conference
- Public School (United Kingdom)
- The Minster School, York
