= John Brandon (divine) =

English divine

Rev. John Brandon (fl. 1687), was an English divine.

== Life ==
Brandon was the son of Charles Brandon, a doctor of Maidenhead, was apparently born at Bray, near that town, about 1644.

He entered Oriel College, Oxford, as a commoner on 15 February 1661–2, and proceeded B.A. on 11 November 1665. Anthony Wood says that "he entertained for some time certain heterodox opinions, but afterwards being orthodox", took holy orders. He became rector of Finchampstead, and for some years preached a weekly lecture on Tuesdays at Reading.

== Writings ==
- Το πύρ το αίώνιον, or Everlasting Fire no Fancy; being an answer to a late pamphlet entit. "The Foundations of Hell-Torments shaken and removed (1678). The book was dedicated to Henry, earl of Starlin, from "Wargrave [in Berkshire], 20 July 1676". It was written in reply to a pamphlet called The Torments of Hell (1658), by Samuel Richardson.
- Happiness at Hand, or a plain and practical discourse of the Joy of just men's souls in the State of Separation from the Body (1687). Dedicated to Dr. Robert Woodward, chancellor of the bishop of Salisbury's court.
- Selected sermons for publication.
