= Lancelot Cutforth =

British Army general

Major-General Sir Lancelot Eric Cutforth, KBE, CB (14 August 1899 – 7 April 1980) was a senior British Army officer.

== Career ==
Lancelot Eric Cutforth was born on 14 August 1899, the son of G. H. Cutforth and educated at St Peter's School, York. After training at the Royal Military Academy, Woolwich, he was commissioned into the British Army in 1918. He was promoted to the rank of Major-General in 1951, and was Director of Ordnance Services from 1955 to 1958, when he retired from the Army; that year, he was appointed Director-General of Inspection at the Ministry of Supply, before becoming Assistant Master-General of Ordnance (Inspection) at the War Office in 1960 (serving until 1962). He then served as chair of the London Area Transport Users' Consultative Committee from 1964 to 1972 and of the London Transport Passengers Committee from 1970 to 1971. Alongside these appointments, he was Colonel Commandant of the Royal Army Ordnance Corps (1957–65).

Appointed an Officer of the Order of the British Empire in 1945, Cutforth was promoted to Commander in 1949 and then Knight Commander in 1958, five years after he had been appointed a Companion of the Order of the Bath. He died on 7 April 1980, leaving a widow, Vera, and two daughters.

== Likenesses ==
- Sir Lancelot Eric Cutforth, by Elliott & Fry (bromide print, 1955). National Portrait Gallery, London (Photographs Collection, NPG x86910).
