= John Lyth =

John Lyth D. D.

Personal details
- Born: 13 March 1821 York, England
- Died: 13 March 1886 (aged 65)
- Denomination: Methodist

John Lyth, D. D. (13 March 1821 – 13 March 1886) was an English Wesleyan Methodist preacher, author, historian and hymn writer. He was the earliest Wesleyan missionary in Germany.

== Biography ==
Lyth was born on 13 March 1821 in York. He attended first St Peter's School, York then Mr. Heigham's Academy in Doncaster, and began work as a preacher in 1843. In 1859 he became the first Wesleyan missionary in Germany, serving as the General Superintendent of the Wesleyan Community from 1859 to 1865. Upon his return to England he successively became Chairman of the Sheffield, Hull, Nottingham and Newcastle Districts. Lyth retired from the ministry in 1883, and died on 13 March 1886.

== Works ==
=== Prose ===
Lyth contributed to four major prose publications during his lifetime. In 1843, he published the History of Methodism in York. This is considered his main work of prose, despite his later release of Glimpses in Early Methodism in York in 1885. Glimpses of Methodism in York covers from the introduction of Methodism in 1729 up to the date of publication. Upon his mother's death in 1860, Lyth compiled and published The Blessedness of Religion In Earnest: A Memorial of Mrs. Mary Lyth, of York. Published in 1861 and constructed mainly from Mary's journal entries, Lyth created this memorial because he felt "an example of 'Religion in Earnest,' so pre-eminent, should not pass unrecorded and unimproved."

Half a decade later, Lyth published The Homiletical Treasury; or, Scripture Analytically Arranged. Originally intended to encompass the entire Bible, The Homiletical Treasury only covers Isaiah (published in 1867) and the Epistles from Romans to Philippians (published 1869). At the date of publication, the London Quarterly Review "[commended] the work, and [trusted] that Mr. Lyth [would] be encouraged to continue his labors," and his work was cited often in an 1884 homiletical commentary. Charles Spurgeon, however, found Homiletical Treasury to be incomplete and surface.

=== Hymns and poetry ===
Lyth also wrote a few hymns. "There Is a Better World, They Say" is a hymn originally written for an infant school in Randwick. Lyth said "that it was written for infant children will explain the simplicity of some of the expressions." Lyth claimed this hymn was based on an earlier piece and dates its writing as 30 April 1845. It was written to the tune of "All is Well," and first appeared in the Home and School Hymn Book. He also wrote "We Won't Give Up the Sabbath," which was included in the Methodist Sunday School Hymn Book in 1879. Both hymns are imitations of older works. Wild Flowers; or, a Selection of Original Poetry, edited by J. L. was compiled and published in 1843. All of the poems Lyth included were written by himself, a family member, or Dr. Punshon.

Lyth's verse rendering of Marcus Aurelius's Meditations was published in 1942, with a preface by Gilbert Murray.
