= Frederick Henry Marvell Blaydes =

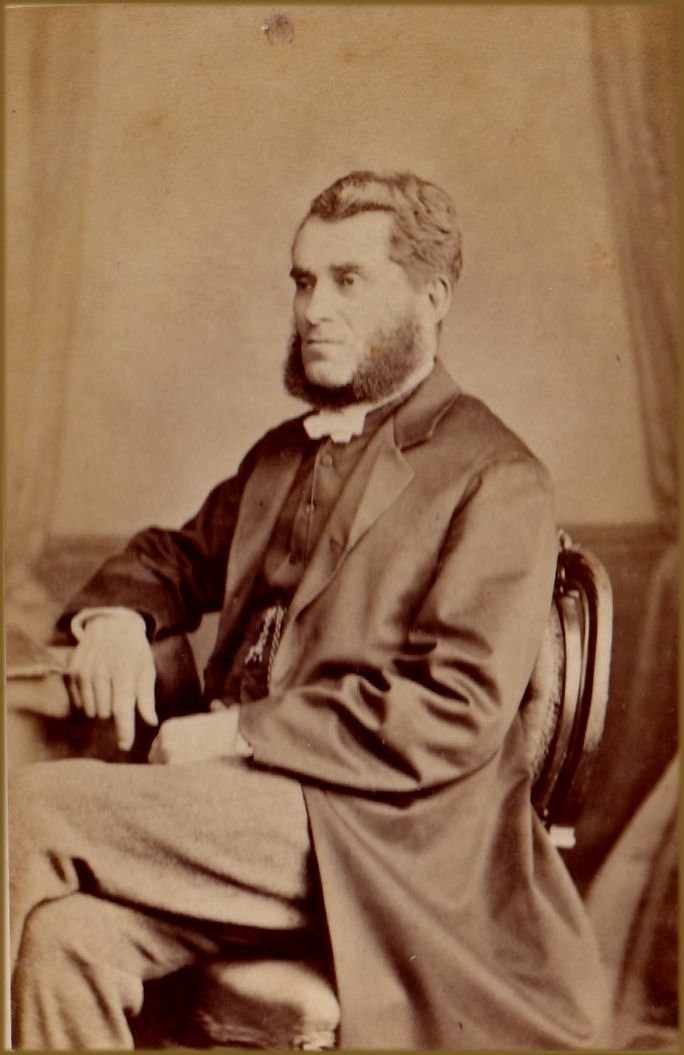
Frederick Henry Marvell Blaydes

Frederick Henry Marvell Blaydes (29 September 1818 – 7 September 1908) was an English cleric and classical scholar.

== Life ==
He was born at Hampton Court Green on 29 September 1818, was third son of Hugh Blaydes (1777–1829) of High Paull, Yorkshire, and of Ranby Hall, Nottinghamshire, J.P. and high sheriff for the latter county; his mother was Delia Maria, second daughter of Colonel Richard Wood of Hollin Hall, Yorkshire. James Blaides of Hull, who married on 25 March 1615 Anne, sister of the poet Andrew Marvell, was a direct ancestor.

After his father's death in 1829, Blaydes was sent to a private school at Boulogne, and then, on 14 September 1831, to St Peter's School, York, where he became a free scholar in June 1832 and gained an exhibition before matriculating at Oxford, 20 October 1836, as a commoner of Christ Church. John Ruskin, about five months his junior, was already a gentleman commoner there, and Thomas Gaisford was dean. In 1838, Blaydes was elected Hertford scholar and was a student of Christ Church, and in Easter term 1840 was placed in the second class in literae humaniores along with George Webbe Dasent and James Anthony Froude. He graduated B.A. in 1840, proceeding M.A. in 1843.

After a long tour through France and Italy in 1840-1, finally spending a week in Athens, he returned to Oxford in August 1841, and issued an edition of Aristophanes' Birds (1842), with short Latin notes. He was ordained deacon in 1842 and priest in 1843, he accepted the college living of Harringworth, Northamptonshire. Harringworth was Blaydes' home for forty-three years (1843–1886). A staunch 'Protestant,' he joined on 10 December 1850 the deputation from his university which, headed by the Chancellor, the Duke of Wellington, presented an address to Queen Victoria against the 'papal aggression'.

But Blaydes' interest and ample leisure were mainly absorbed by classical study. In 1845, he published an edition of a second play of Aristophanes The Acharnians. In 1859, he published in the Bibliotheca classica three plays of Sophocles. The reception of the book was not altogether favourable, and a difference with the publishers led him to issue separately the four remaining plays with Williams & Norgate. He reckoned that he gave more than twenty years to Sophocles, and, with intervals, more than fifty to Aristophanes.

Blaydes resigned his benefice in 1884, and from 1886 lived at Brighton. In 1907, he moved to Southsea, where he died, retaining his vigour till near the end, on 7 September 1908; he was buried in Brighton Cemetery.

== Family ==
Blaydes married first, in 1843, Fanny Maria Page-Turner, one of the co-heiresses of Sir Edward George Thomas Page-Turner, of Ambrosden, Oxfordshire, and Battlesden, Bedfordshire; she was killed in a carriage accident, 21 August 1884, leaving three sons and four daughters. Blaydes' second wife was Emma Nichols.

== Works ==
His works include:

- Aristophanes:
  - Comedies and Fragments, with critical notes and commentary (1880-1893)
  - Clouds, Knights, Frogs, Wasps (1873-1878)
  - Opera Omnia, with critical notes (1886)
- Sophocles:
  - Oedipus Coloneus
  - Oedipus Tyrannus
  - Antigone (in the Bibliotheca Classica, 1859)
  - Philoctetes (1870)
  - Trachiniae (1871)
  - Electra (1873)
  - Ajax (1875)
  - Antigone (1905)
- Aeschylus:
  - Agamemnon (1898)
  - Choephori (1899)
  - Eumenides (1900)
- Adversaria Critica In Comicorum Graecorum Fragmenta (1890)
- Tragicorum Graec. Frag. (1894)
- In Aeschylum (1895)
- Varios Poetas Graecos et Latinos (1898)
- In Aristophanem (1899)
- In Sophoclem (1899)
- In Euripidem (1901)
- In Herodotum (1901)
- Analecta Comica Graeca (1905)
- Analecta Tragica Graeca (1906)
