= Sherborne International =

Location
- Newell Grange; Sherborne, Dorset, DT9 4EZ; United Kingdom
- Coordinates: 50.95097°N 2.52085°W

Information
- Type: Independent boarding school
- Established: 1977
- Founder: Mr Robin Macnaughten
- Local authority: 835 Dorset
- Department for Education URN: 113948 Tables
- Chairman of the Governors: Mr Roger Fidgen
- Principal: Mr Tim Waters
- Gender: Co-educational
- Age: 8 to 17
- Capacity: 150
- Houses: 4

Sherborne International (formerly the International College, Sherborne School) is a private co-educational fully boarding school for boys and girls aged between 8 and 17-years-old. It is located in the historic town of Sherborne in Dorset in the south-west of England.

== Background ==
The school was established in 1977 by Sherborne School to prepare students from non-British educational backgrounds so that they could function successfully in traditional British Boarding Schools. The school is intended to give those from non-British, non-English speaking educational backgrounds, who wish to join the English educational system, the best possible start. Classes normally have a maximum of 8 students. The school also runs intensive courses during both the Spring and Summer vacations. Although Sherborne International is owned and governed by Sherborne School, it is registered with the Department for Education as a separate school.

== History ==
In 1977 the Headmaster of Sherborne School, the late Mr Robin Macnaughten, decided to start a separate specialist unit at the school to prepare students from non-British, non-English speaking backgrounds to sit entrance examinations for Sherborne School and other British independent schools. The unit was based in a building owned by Sherborne School called Greenhill House. The Greenhill House Study Centre opened in January 1977 and by January 1980 had expanded to take over the whole of Greenhill House. By the end of 1982 the school had acquired a boarding annexe called Cheapside, in Newland, Sherborne.

In September 1991 the Newell Grange campus was opened and in 1992 the school ran its first "Fourth Term" summer school course. In 1995 the Centre was registered as a separate school with the Department of Education and in September 1998 the Centre changed its name to the International College, Sherborne School. Additional teaching facilities were opened in 1999, and a further teaching building has been in use since September 2005.

Girls were enrolled for the first time in 1996 and in 1999 Westcott House was allocated to the school to house female students. Grosvenor House (adjacent to Westcott) was opened in September 2002 to accommodate the junior boys and a further girls’ boarding house, Mowat House, was opened in January 2011.

In 2014 the International College, Sherborne School changed its name to become Sherborne International.

== Boarding Houses ==
Sherborne International has three boarding houses with a new House planned for January 2021

- King's House (senior and junior girls) – Housemistress Mrs Maria Loddo
- Mowat House (junior boys) – Housemistress Ms Karen Browne
- Westcott House (senior boys) – Housemaster Simon Bonelli-Bean

== Principals ==
- Mr Frank Francis (1977–1980)
- Mr Ralph Mowat (1980–1997)
- Dr Christopher Greenfield (1997–2013)
- Mrs Mary Arnal (2013–2015)
- Mr Philip Hardaker (2016)
- Mr Tim Waters (2016–present)

== Notable former students ==
- Sheikh Tamim bin Hamad Al Thani, Emir of the state of Qatar
- King Mswati III, King of Eswatini
- Srettha Thavisin, former Prime Minister of Thailand
