= Grand Mountet Hut =

Coordinates: 46°03′36.3″N 7°39′12.6″E

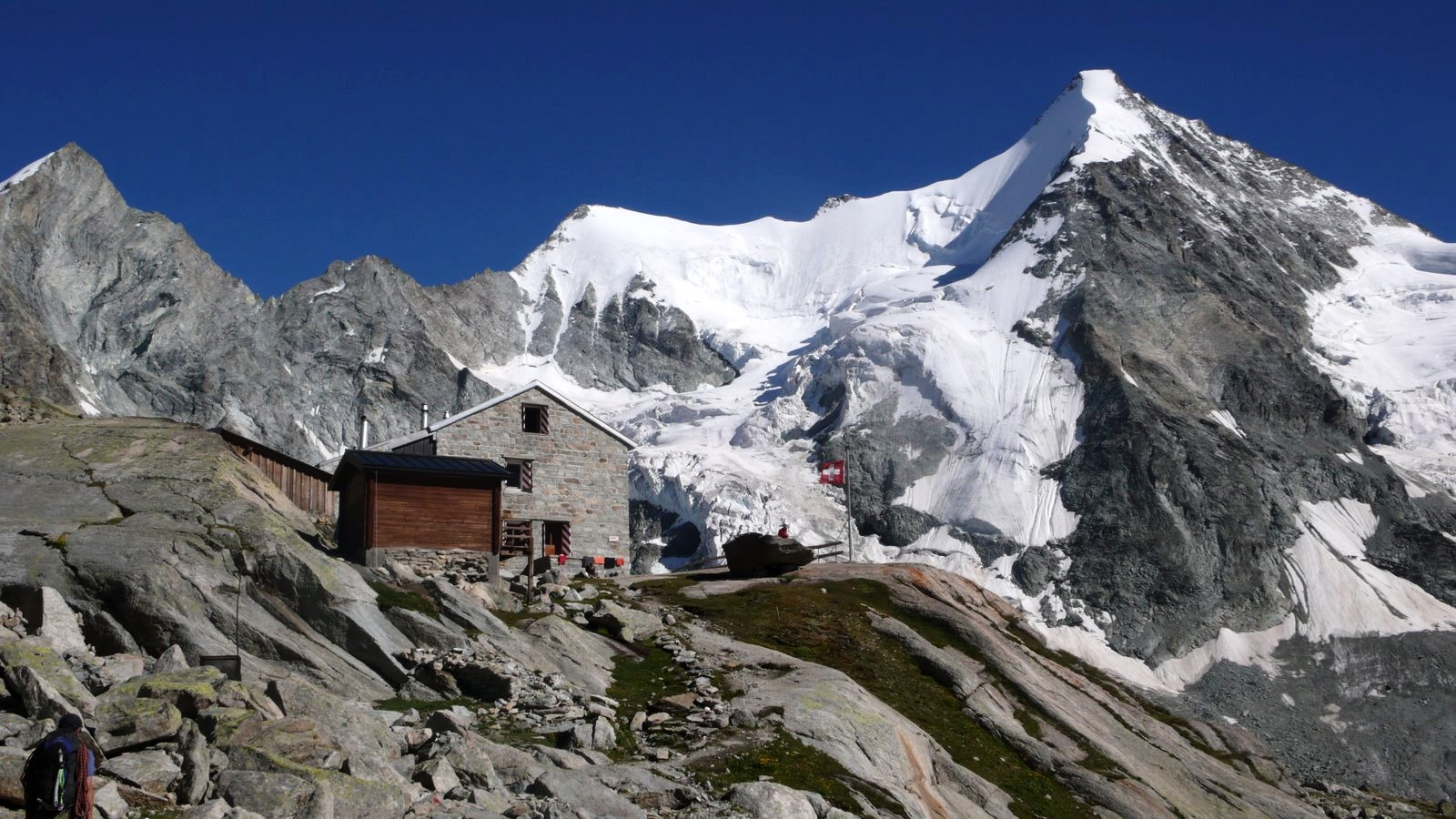
Grand Mountet Hut and Ober Gabelhorn

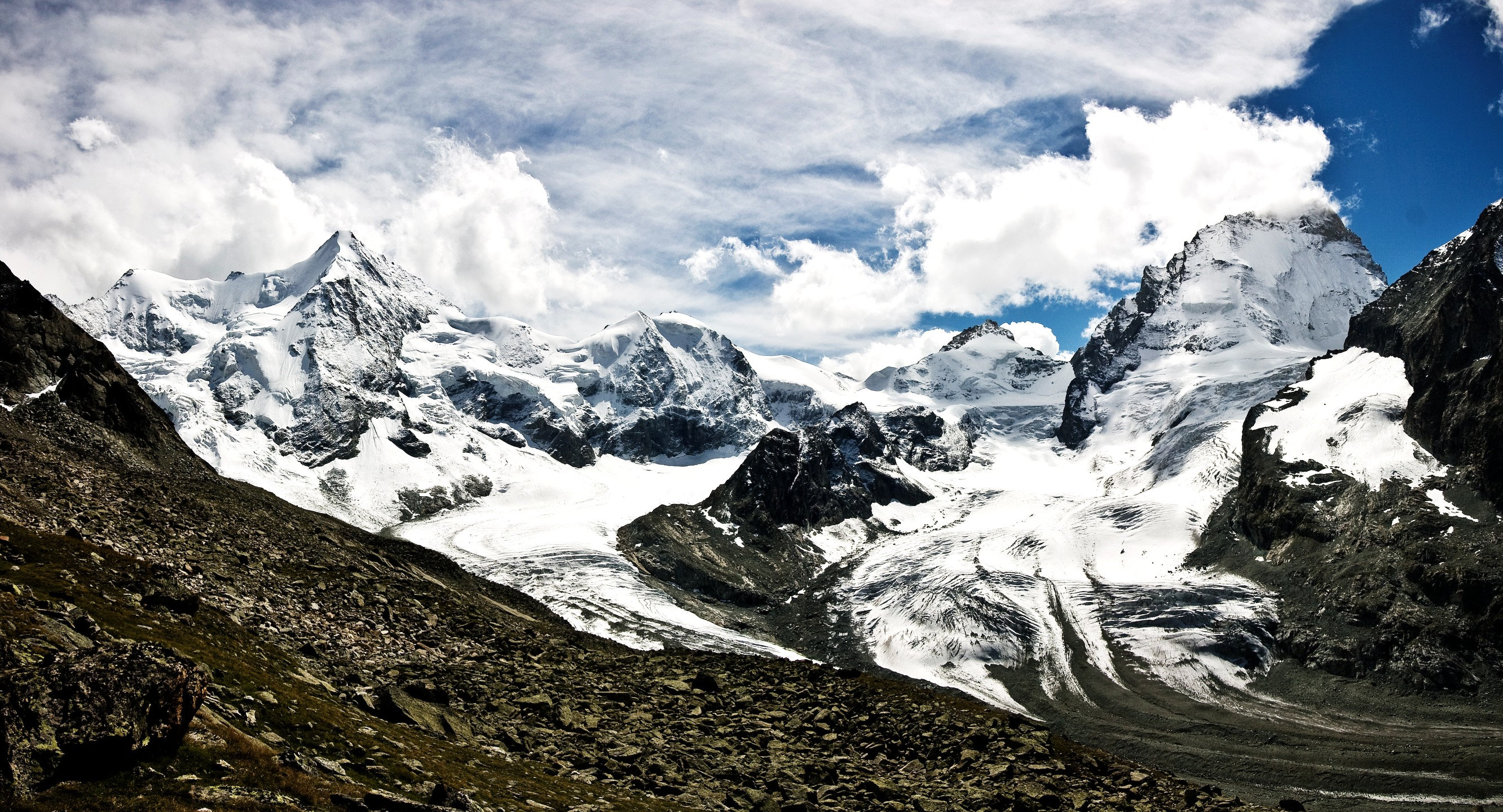
View from the area

The Grand Mountet Hut (2,886 m) (French: Cabane du Grand Mountet) is a mountain hut located in the Pennine Alps near Zinal in the canton of Valais in Switzerland. It is used at a start point for the ascents of Besso, Zinalrothorn, Ober Gabelhorn, Trifthorn, Mont Durand, Pointe de Zinal, Grand Cornier and Dent Blanche.

The hut was originally built in 1887, but it has been modified and rebuilt a number of times, the latest modification being in 1996. It currently has accommodation for 115 people.

Although the hut is located in the middle of glaciers, it is accessible by a trail and frequented by hikers because of the impressive view over the Zinal Glacier and high summits around.

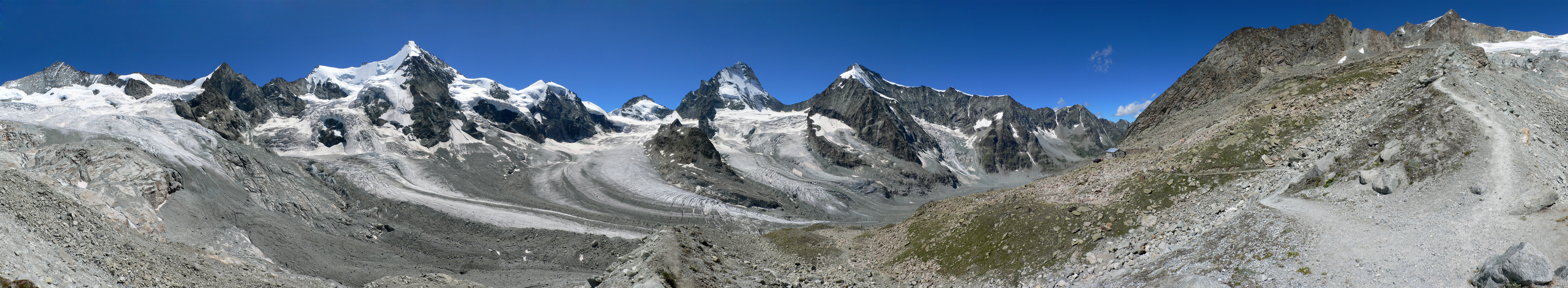
360° panorama with Grand Mountet Hut
