= Guide =

Person who escorts travelers or tourists through unfamiliar locations

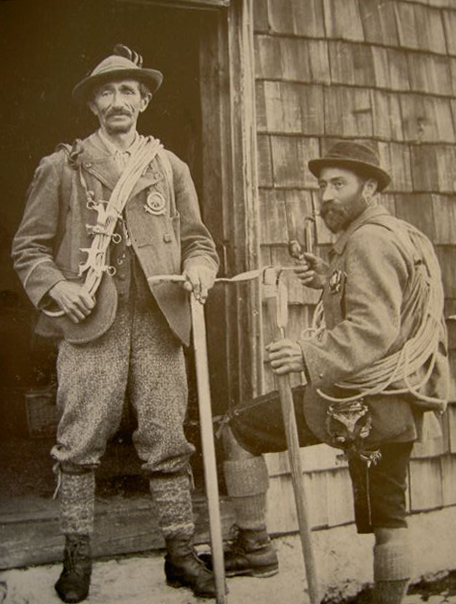
Austrian alpine mountain guides Anselm Klotz (left) and Josef Frey (right), 19th century

A guide is a person who leads travelers, sportspeople, or tourists through unknown or unfamiliar locations. The term can also be applied to a person who leads others to more abstract goals such as knowledge or wisdom.

== Travel and recreation ==
Explorers in the past venturing into territory unknown by their own people invariably hired guides. Military explorers Lewis and Clark were hired by the United States Congress to explore the Pacific Northwest. They in turn hired the better qualified Native American Sacagawea to help them. Wilfred Thesiger hired guides in the deserts that he ventured into, such as Kuri on his journey to the Tibesti Mountains in 1938.

=== Tour guide ===
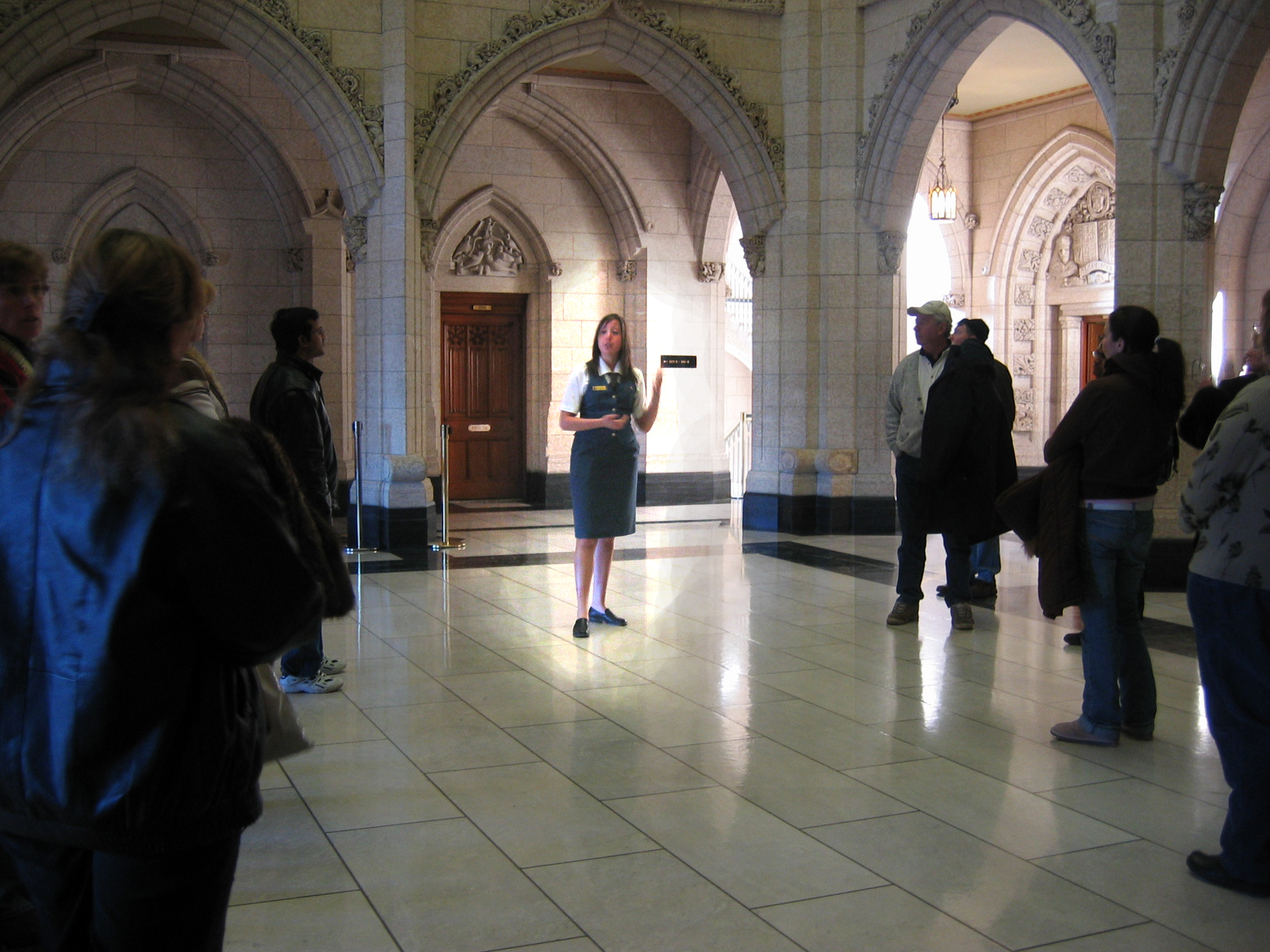
A tour guide at the Centre Block in Canada

Tour guides lead visitors through tourist attractions and give information about the attractions' natural and cultural significance. Often, they also act as interpreters for travelers who do not speak the local language. Automated systems like audio tours are sometimes substituted for human tour guides. Tour operators often hire guides to lead tourist groups.

=== Mountain guide ===
Mountain guides are those employed in mountaineering; these are not merely to show the way but stand in the position of professional climbers with an expert knowledge of rock and snowcraft, which they impart to the amateur, at the same time assuring the safety of the climbing party. This professional class of guides arose in the middle of the 19th century when Alpine climbing became recognized as a sport.

In Switzerland, the central committee of the Swiss Alpine Club issues a guides’ tariff which fixes the charges for guides and porters; there are three sections, for the Valais and Vaudois Alps, for the Bernese Oberland, and for central and eastern Switzerland.

In Chamonix (France) a statue has been raised to Jacques Balmat, who was the first to climb Mont Blanc in 1786. Other notable European guides are Christian Almer, Jakob and Melchior Anderegg, Klemens Bachleda, Auguste Balmat, Alexander Burgener, Armand Charlet, Michel Croz, François Devouassoud, Angelo Dibona, Andreas Heckmair, the Innerkofler family, Conrad Kain, Christian Klucker, and Matthias Zurbriggen.

=== Wilderness guide ===
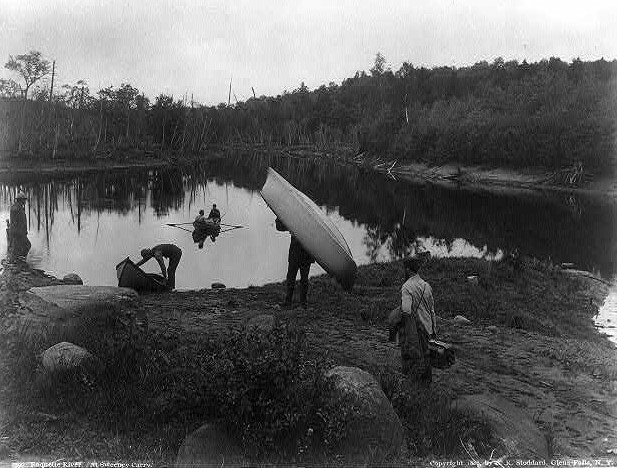
Adirondack guides (carrying and rowing guideboats on the Raquette River, 1888

A wilderness guide leads paid parties through back country areas that may variously include land, water bodies, and high country — but not so high and technical as to require the skills of a mountain guide. Wilderness guides in the United States are historically and romantically particularly associated with the Adirondack Mountains of New York State, where they first established the application of their skills as a broadly accepted and financially compensated trade.

Wilderness guides are expected to have a command of survival skills (such as making shelters, fire-making, navigation, and first aid) and an understanding of the ecology and history of the location where they guide. Other common skills among guides include traditional handicrafts and cooking methods, fishing, hunting, bird watching, and nature conservation.

Wilderness tours usually take place on foot, though aids such as skis and snowshoes, and conveyances such as canoes, kayaks, sledges, pack animals, and snowmobiles are utilized as appropriate.

=== Hunting guide ===
Hunting guides are employed by those seeking to hunt wildlife, especially big game animals in the wild. European hunting guides working in Africa are sometimes called white hunters, although the term is most commonly used in the context of the early 20th century.

=== Safari guide ===
Guides are employed on safari, today usually just to observe and photograph wildlife, historically for big-game hunting. Safari guides are either self-employed or work for or through a guide service. There are no set qualifications or universal licensing procedures; customs and requirements vary by location. In lieu, many guides choose to belong to a professional association. These are typically linked to specific countries and are governed by their laws and policies. Associations such as The Field Guides Association of Southern Africa (FGASA) and Uganda Safari Guides Association (USAGA) play an important role in training and educating safari guides to improve their knowledge and group safety. Many famed safari guides are found on the list of famous big-game hunters.

=== Fishing guide ===
Fishing guides have a long history. Their work spans from aiding fly fishing in small brooks or lakes to deep saltwater big game fishing. Some areas where fishing guides are popular include the Norwegian coast, Swedish archipelago, the Florida coast, and various parts of Canada. The vernacular terms "fishing charter" or "charter boat" imply the services of a guide, whether the vessel's captain, a qualified hand, or experienced sportsman.

=== River guide ===
River guides lead clients on day trips and overnight expeditions on rivers. They are expected to identify and navigate river features effectively in their watercraft of choice. A wide variety of watercraft are used, including inflatable rafts, canoes, inflatable and hard-shell kayaks, stand-up paddleboards, drift boats, and jet boats. Guides who routinely work on or around fast moving water practice swift water rescue techniques, and employ them when necessary. Some river guides offer other services, such as fishing and wildlife viewing.

== Military guides ==
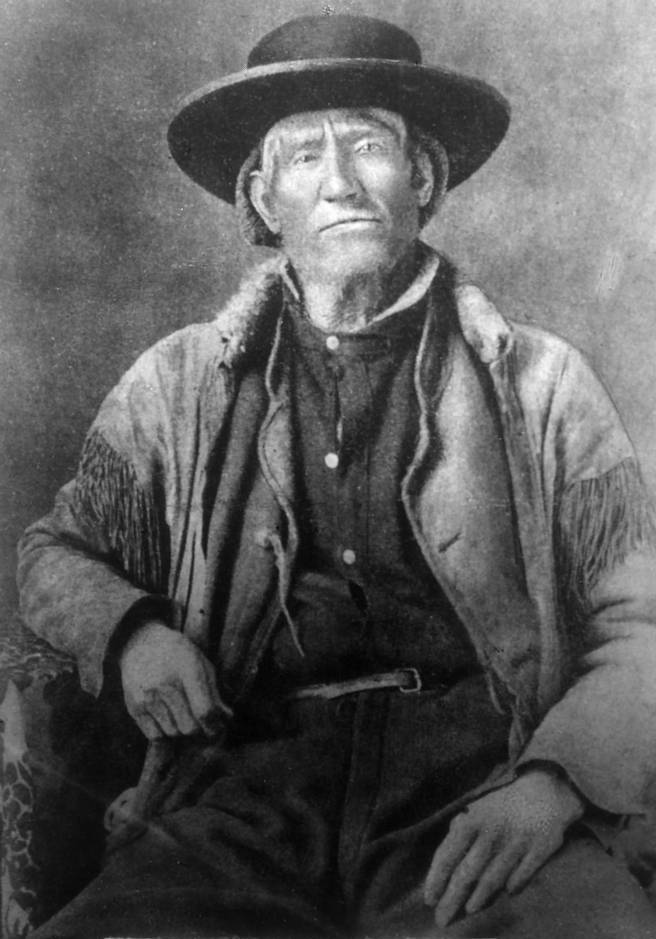
Famed mountain man Jim Bridger served as guide and army scout during the first Powder River Expedition in 1865 against the Sioux and Cheyenne in Dakota and Montana Territories.

Historically in areas where detailed maps were unavailable, guides with local knowledge were employed for scouting and advance leadership during military operations. In 18th century Europe, the stricter organization of military resources led in various countries to the special training of guide officers who had the primary duty of finding, and if necessary establishing, routes for military units.

=== Guides regiments ===
The genesis of the guides regiments may be found in a short-lived Corps of Guides formed by Napoleon in Italy in 1796, which appears to have been a personal escort or bodyguard composed of men who knew the country. Following the unification of Italy in 1860, the new national army included a cavalry regiment designated: Guides Regiment.

In the Belgian Army the two guides regiments, created respectively in 1833 and 1874, constituted part of the light cavalry and came to correspond to the guard cavalry of other nations. Until the outbreak of World War I, they wore a distinctive uniform comprising a plumed busby, green dolman braided in yellow, and crimson breeches. Mechanised in October 1937, both regiments formed armored battalions in the post World War II Belgian Army. Following a series of amalgamations the Belgian guides ceased to exist in 2011.

In the Swiss army prior to 1914, the squadrons of guides acted as divisional cavalry. In this role these light cavalry units were called upon, on occasion, to lead columns and provide scouts.

The Corps of Guides of the British Indian Army consisted of a unique combination of infantry companies and cavalry squadrons. After World War I the infantry element was incorporated in the 12th Frontier Force Regiment and the Guides Cavalry formed a separate regiment - the 10th Queen Victoria's Own Corps of Guides Cavalry (Frontier Force). This unit still exists as the 2nd (Guides) Battalion of the Frontier Force Regiment of the modern Army of Pakistan.

In drill, a guide is an officer or non-commissioned officer who regulates the direction and pace of movements.

== Metaphysics ==
=== Trip sitter ===
A psychedelic guide is someone who guides a drug user's experiences as opposed to a sitter who merely remains present, ready to discourage bad trips and handle emergencies but not otherwise getting involved. Guides are more common amongst spiritual users of entheogens. Psychedelic guides were strongly encouraged by Timothy Leary and the other authors of The Psychedelic Experience: A Guide Based on the Tibetan Book of the Dead. Trip sitters are also mentioned in the Responsible Drug User's Oath.

=== Guided meditation ===
A "mentor, guide, expert, or master" is called a Guru in Sanskrit language.

=== In Islam ===
In Islam ar-Rashid, one of the 99 Names of God, means the Guide. From this is derived the common Arabic name Rashid.

== See also ==
- Porter
- Mountain guide
