= Yvette Vaucher =

Swiss ski mountaineer (1929–2023)

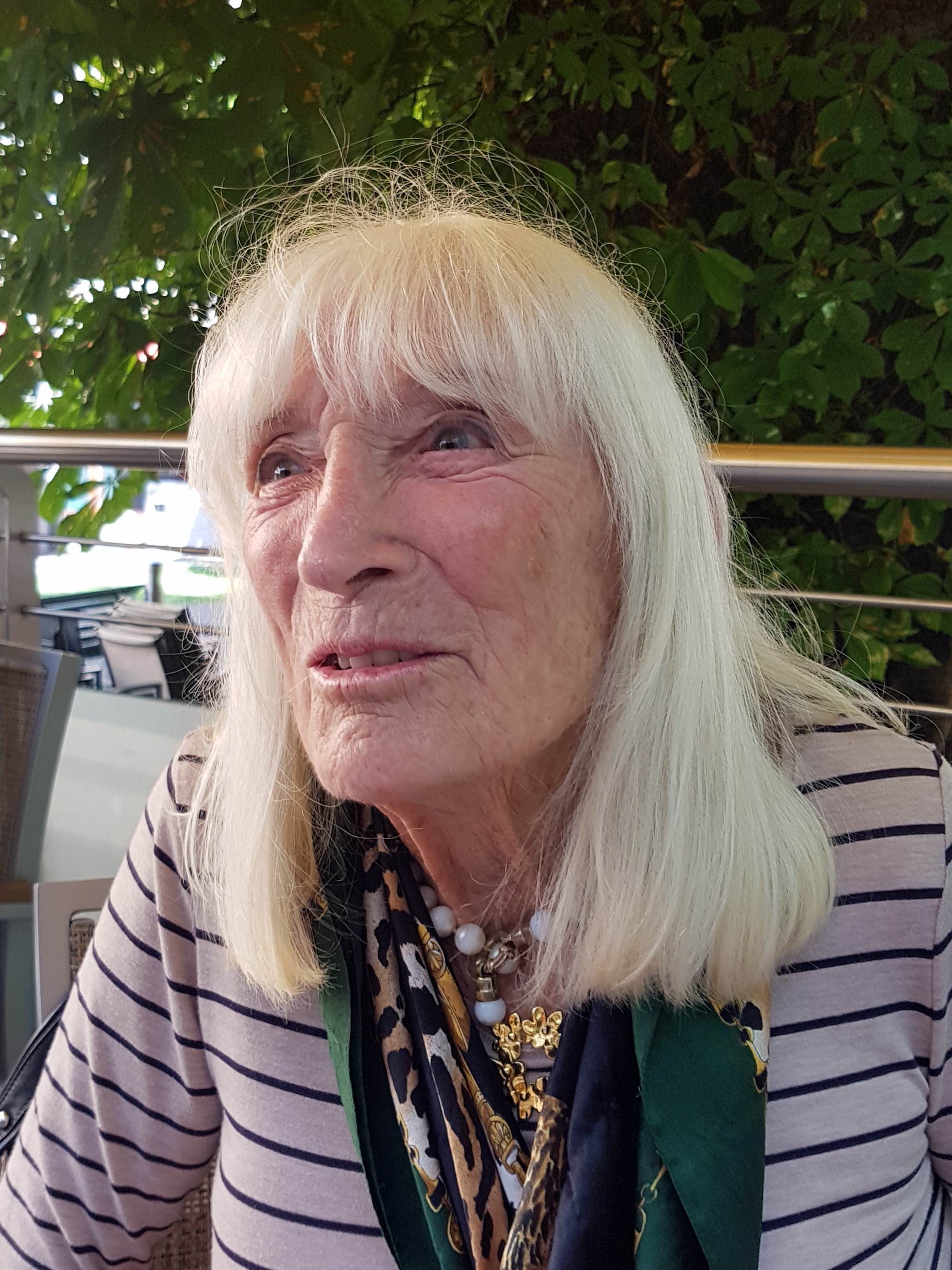
Yvette Vaucher in 2018

Yvette Vaucher (née Pilliard; 11 November 1929 – 30 September 2023) was a Swiss mountaineer and parachutist. Credited as Switzerland's first female parachutist, she was also the first woman to climb the Matterhorn's north face.

== Biography ==
Yvette Pilliard was born on 11 November 1929 in Vallorbe, Switzerland. She took up rock climbing in 1951 and climbed mainly on the Salève in the French Prealps near Geneva, where she joined a group of women climbers who were regulars on the Salève. In 1955, she moved to Neuchâtel, where she began free fall parachuting. She is credited as Switzerland's first female parachutist. She had made over 100 mountain descents via parachute before she formed a climbing team with Michel Vaucher, a mountaineer whom she married in 1962.

One of Vaucher's most famous climbs was the Matterhorn in July 1965. When she reached the summit on July 14, she became the first woman to have climbed the Matterhorn's north face. She made the ascent with her husband on the 100th anniversary of the first successful ascent of the mountain, and their "surprise climb" was noted to have "stole[n] the spotlight" from two other climbing teams who were planning to climb the Matterhorn at the same time with film crews to broadcast their ascent on live television. An article in the St. Petersburg Times about the Vauchers' success was titled "Swiss Housewife Steals Matterhorn Show", and when interviewed about her plans after the descent, Yvette answered, "to go have a hair-do – fast."

The stele of Vaucher's grave.

Yvette and Michel Vaucher made numerous significant climbs in the Alps throughout the 1960s and 1970s, including Piz Badile, the Aiguille de Triolet, the Aiguille du Dru, the Eiger, the Große Zinne and the Grandes Jorasses. In 1966, they made the first direct ascent of the north face of the Dent Blanche. They climbed frequently with Loulou Boulaz and her partner Michel Darbellay.

Vaucher and her husband joined an international expedition to Mount Everest headed by Norman Dyhrenfurth in 1971; she intended to become the first woman to reach the summit of Everest. Tensions and conflict were rife within the team, however, and the expedition was ultimately unsuccessful. Vaucher, upset with Dyhrenfurth's leadership, is said to have thrown snowballs at him before leaving the expedition.

Vaucher was denied membership of the Swiss Alpine Club until 1979, when she became one of the first women to be made an honorary member. As of 2012, she continued to hike regularly in the Alps, despite having hip and knee replacements.

Vaucher died on 30 September 2023, at the age of 93. She found her final resting place at the Cimetière des Rois, which is considered the Panthéon of Geneva. Her tombstone is a stele made of marble from Saillon which resembles the shape of the Matterhorn. It was dedicated by the Genevan section of the Swiss Alpine Club.
