= Pointe de Zinal =

Mountain of the Swiss Pennine Alps

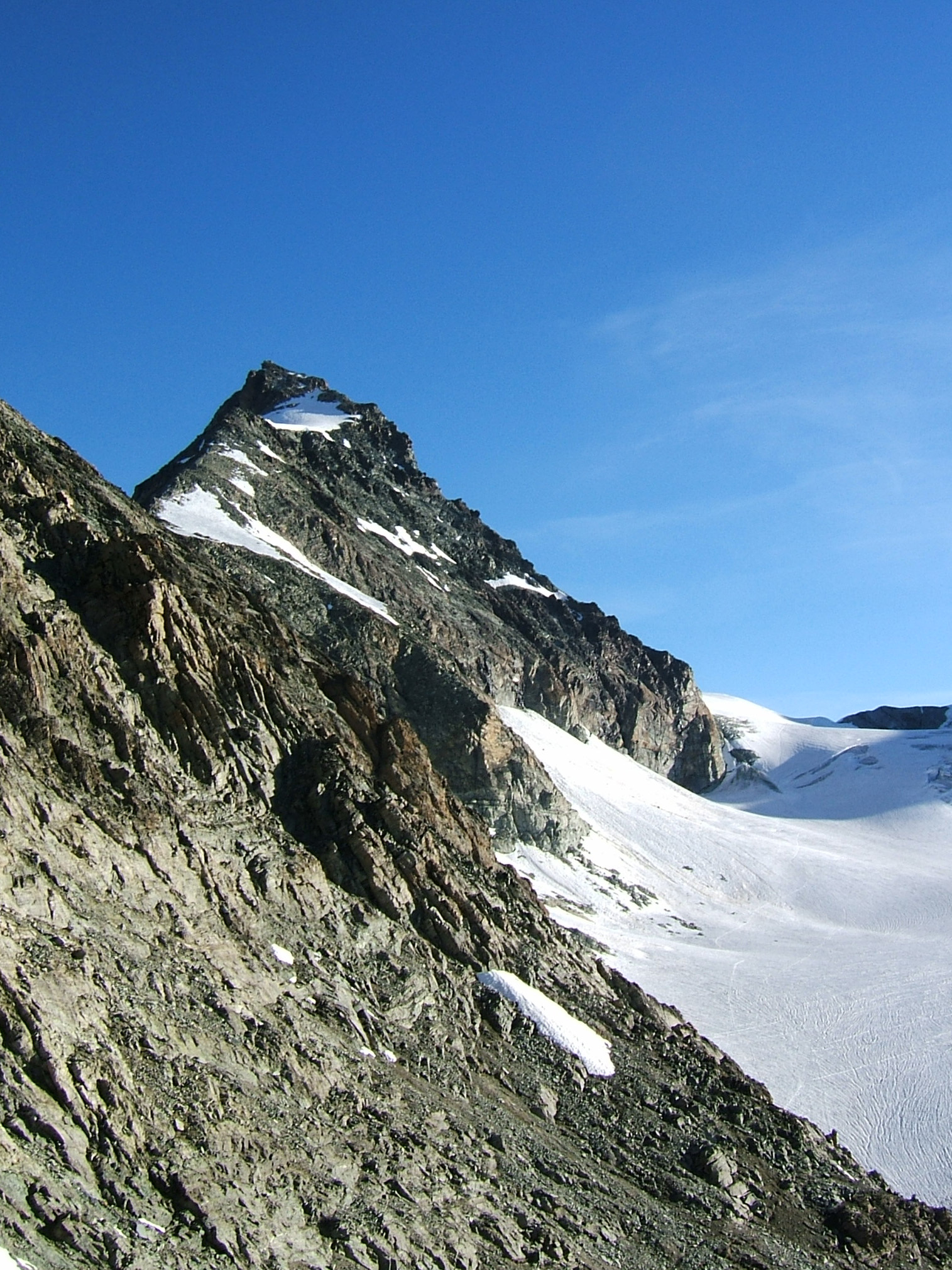
- Pointe de Zinal from south

Highest point
- Elevation: 3,789 m (12,431 ft)
- Prominence: 301 m (988 ft)
- Parent peak: Dent Blanche
- Listing: Alpine mountains above 3000 m
- Coordinates: 46°01′38.7″N 7°37′50.3″E

Geography
- Location within Switzerland
- Location: Valais, Switzerland
- Parent range: Pennine Alps

The Pointe de Zinal is a mountain of the Swiss Pennine Alps, located south of Zinal in the canton of Valais. It is situated east of the Dent Blanche, between the valleys of Zinal and Zmutt (Zermatt).

== See also ==
- List of mountains of Switzerland
