= Jakob Anderegg =

Swiss mountain guide

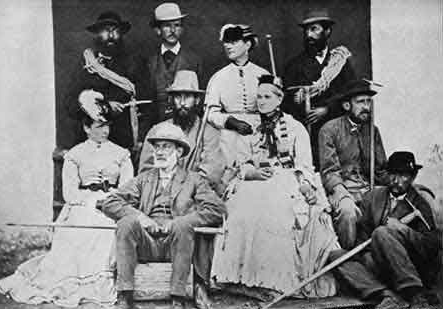
- Jakob Anderegg (standing, top left), with the members of the Walker family, A. W. Moore
- Born: March 11, 1829; Oberwil im Simmental
- Died: September 17, 1878 (aged 49); Meiringen
- Occupation: Swiss mountain guide

Jakob Anderegg (11 March 1829, in Oberwil im Simmental – 17 September 1878, in Meiringen) was a Swiss mountain guide and the first ascensionist of many prominent mountains in the western Alps during the golden and silver ages of alpinism. Jakob Anderegg made the first ascent of the following peaks or routes:

- Balmhorn (Bernese Alps), 21 July 1864 with Frank, Lucy and Horace Walker, and Melchior Anderegg
- Piz Roseg (Bernina Range) with A. W. Moore and Horace Walker on 28 June 1865
- Ober Gabelhorn (Pennine Alps) with A. W. Moore and Horace Walker on 6 July 1865
- Pigne d'Arolla (Pennine Alps) with A. W. Moore and Melchior Anderegg on 9 July 1865
- Brenva Spur of Mont Blanc (Mont Blanc massif) with George Spencer Mathews, A. W. Moore, Frank and Horace Walker on 15 July 1865
- Gspaltenhorn (Bernese Alps) with G. E. Forster and Hans Baumann on 10 July 1869

== Bibliography ==
- Dangar, D. F. O. (1961). "Jakob Anderegg" (PDF). Alpine Journal: 89–99.
- Fleming, Fergus (2003). Nach oben. Die ersten Eroberungen der Alpengipfel. München: Piper Verlag. ISBN 3492247512.
