= Adolphus Warburton Moore =

British civil servant and mountaineer

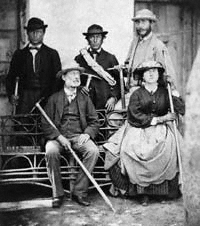
- 1871 portrait of Moore (top right) with Lucy Walker, seated beside her father Frank Walker, and Melchior Anderegg (standing, centre). The identity of the other man is not known.
- Born: 1841
- Died: 1887 (aged 45–46)
- Employer: Civil service
- Known for: Mountaineering

Adolphus Warburton Moore (1841–1887) (known generally as A. W. Moore) was a British civil servant and mountaineer.

== Life ==
The son of Major John Arthur Moore and Sophia Stewart Yates, Moore was an India Office official from 1858 to 1887, holding the role of Assistant Secretary, Political Department from 1875 to 1885. He was also private secretary to Lord Randolph Churchill.

== Alpinism ==
Moore made a first ascent during his first visit to the Alps in 1862 and immediately became a central figure in the golden age of alpinism.

Moore's first ascents include:

- 23 July 1862: Fiescherhorn (Bernese Alps) with H. B. George and the guides Christian Almer and Ulrich Kaufmann
- 25 June 1864: Barre des Écrins (Dauphiné Alps) with Edward Whymper and Horace Walker, and the guides Michel Croz, Christian Almer the elder, and Christian Almer the younger
- 28 June 1865:
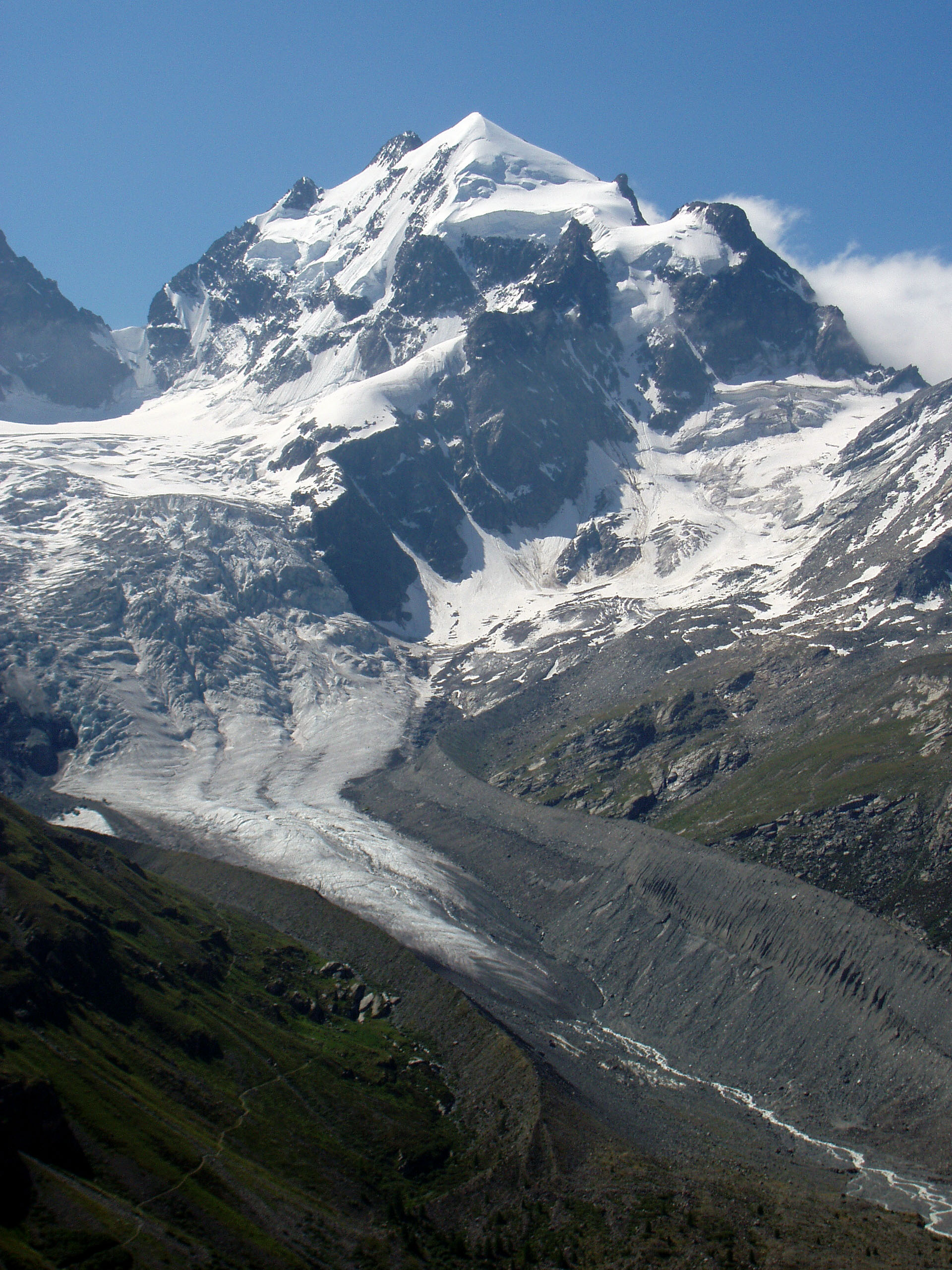
  Piz Roseg
  Piz Roseg (Bernina Alps) with Horace Walker and the guide Jakob Anderegg
- 6 July 1865: Ober Gabelhorn (Pennine Alps) with Horace Walker and Jakob Anderegg
- 9 July 1865: Pigne d'Arolla (Pennine Alps) with Horace Walker and Jakob Anderegg
- 15 July 1865: Brenva Spur on Mont Blanc with George Spencer Mathews, Frank Walker and Horace Walker, and the guides Jakob Anderegg and Melchior Anderegg

This last route, the Brenva Spur, was the first to be climbed on the remote southern side of Mont Blanc and exceeded in difficulty anything that had thus far been attempted on the mountain. Moore's description of the Brenva ascent is, according to Claire Engel, 'amongst the finest Alpine tales in existence'.

Moore went to the Caucasus with Douglas Freshfield, Charles Comyns Tucker and the guide François Devouassoud in 1868, making the first ascent by a non-native of Mount Elbrus (the lower of the two summits), the highest mountain in the Caucasus, and the first ascent of Kazbek with the same party.

== Commemoration ==
Both Pic Moore and Col Moore on the Brenva face side of Mont Blanc are named after him. According to F. S. Smythe, who together with Thomas Graham Brown gave the col its name during their first ascent of the Brenva face by the "Sentinelle Rouge" route in 1927, "The ordinary Brenva route [the Brenva Spur] begins with the ascent of a little gap, which we named Col Moore in honour of the first conqueror of the Brenva route, A. W. Moore, situated between the foot of the Brenva ridge and a miniature peak now known as the Pic Moore."

== Bibliography ==
Moore, A. W., The Alps In 1864: A Private Journal, London: Basil Blackwell, 1939 (originally printed in 1867 for private circulation)
