= George Percival Baker =

Botanist (1856–1951)

- Born: 16 February 1856; Constantinople
- Died: 29 December 1951 (aged 95); Sevenoaks, Kent, UK
- Scientific career
- Fields: Botany
- Author abbrev. (botany): G.P.Baker

George Percival Baker FRGS (1856–1951) was a textile merchant and manufacturer, collector of fabrics from India and Persia, amateur botanist, mountaineer, oarsman, and amateur photographer.

== Biography ==
George Percival Baker's father George Baker in 1848 designed and supervised the creation of the garden at the British Embassy at Constantinople and, after completing the work, in Constantinople went into the trading business, including the export of Turkish carpets. After education at a Franciscan monastery school and then at a British school in Pera, G. P. Baker and his brother Harry were sent to England and continued their education at a private school in Knights Hill, Norwood. About five later, G. P. Baker returned to Constantinople in 1871 and went into the family business. In 1874 G. P. Baker left Constantinople to work in England for the family business. In 1884, when he was 28 years old, he married Mary Emily "Minnie" Davis. With capital from their father, he and his brother James founded in 1884 the firm G P & J Baker and purchased in 1893 the long-established printing firm of Swaisland located in Crayford, Kent. G. P. Baker was an important collector of early Oriental fabrics and a leading expert on calico painting and printing in the East Indies.

As a mountaineer, G. P. Baker is most famous as one of a party of four who in August 1882 opened a new route on the east ridge of Dent Blanche.

After thirty years of strenuous and distinguished mountaineering and exploration, as described in his mountaineering obituary, George Percival Baker gave up serious climbing in 1911 and thereafter devoted himself to plant hunting in a number of European countries, including the Caucasus, with his life-long friend George Yeld, three visits to Crete, Morocco, the High Atlas, Corsica, Greece, Asia Minor, the Lebanon and Palestine, the Riff Mountains of French Morocco, the Pyrenees and Switzerland, and from each he brought back treasures to beautify his garden as well as to benefit horticulture generally.

In 1929 G. P. Baker and Marco Bonakis were pioneers in the use of seaplanes to transport plants. In 1933 G. P. Baker was awarded the Victoria Medal of Honour of the Royal Horticultural Society.

G. P. and Minnie Baker had five sons and two daughters. Three of the sons died in WW I.

(Araliaceae) Bakeria Seem. is named in honour of the botanist J. G. Baker of Thirsk. The plant genus Bakeria now contains no taxonomically accepted names.
