= Wellenkuppe =

Mountain in Switzerland

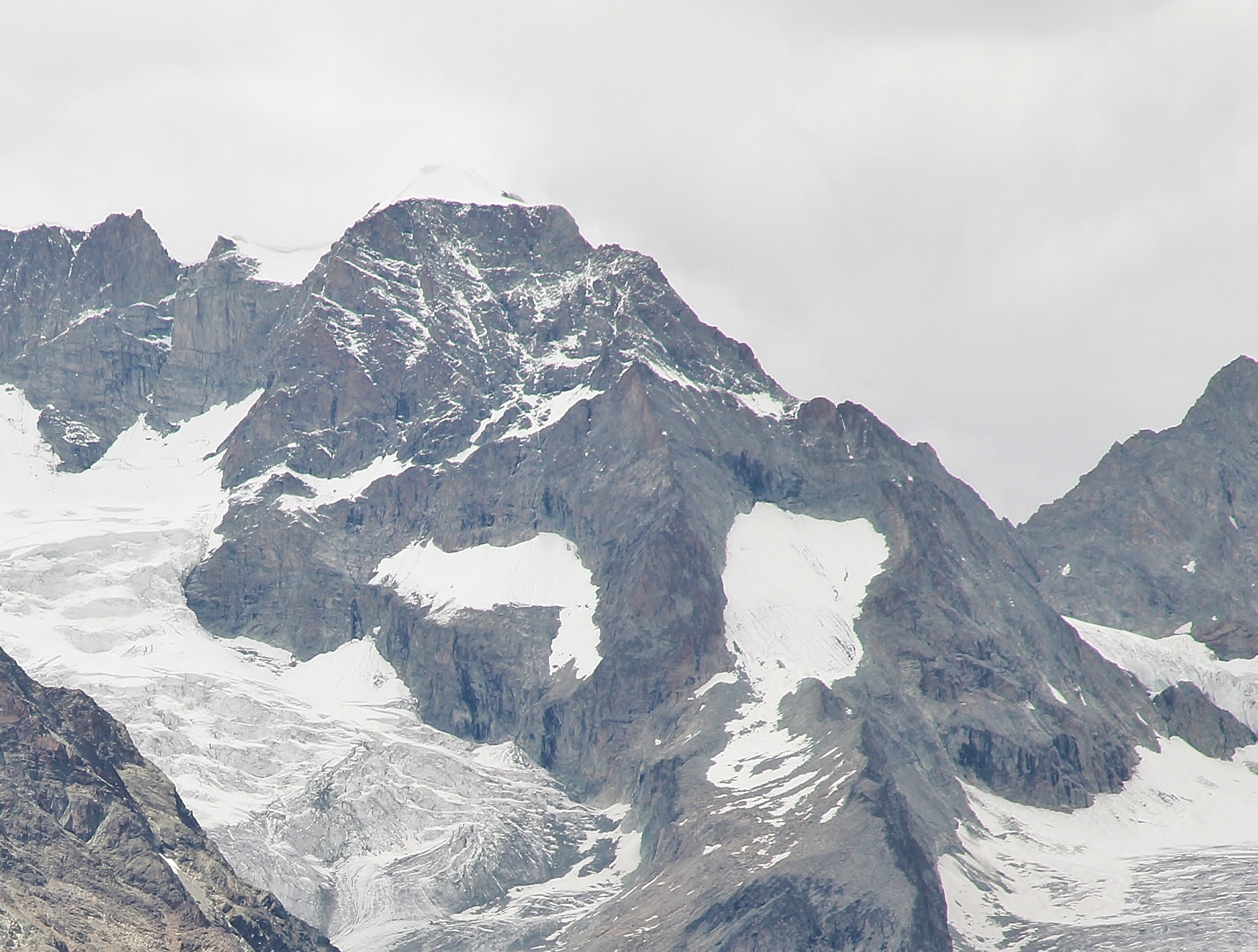
- The east side

Highest point
- Elevation: 3,898 m (12,789 ft)
- Prominence: 94 m (308 ft)
- Parent peak: Ober Gabelhorn
- Coordinates: 46°02′31″N 7°40′40″E

Geography
- Location within Switzerland
- Location: Valais, Switzerland
- Parent range: Pennine Alps

The Wellenkuppe is a mountain of the Swiss Pennine Alps, located west of Zermatt in the canton of Valais. It lies on the range separating the Val d'Anniviers from the Mattertal, just east of the Ober Gabelhorn.
