= Planpincieux Glacier =

Hanging glacier in the Mont Blanc massif of the Alps

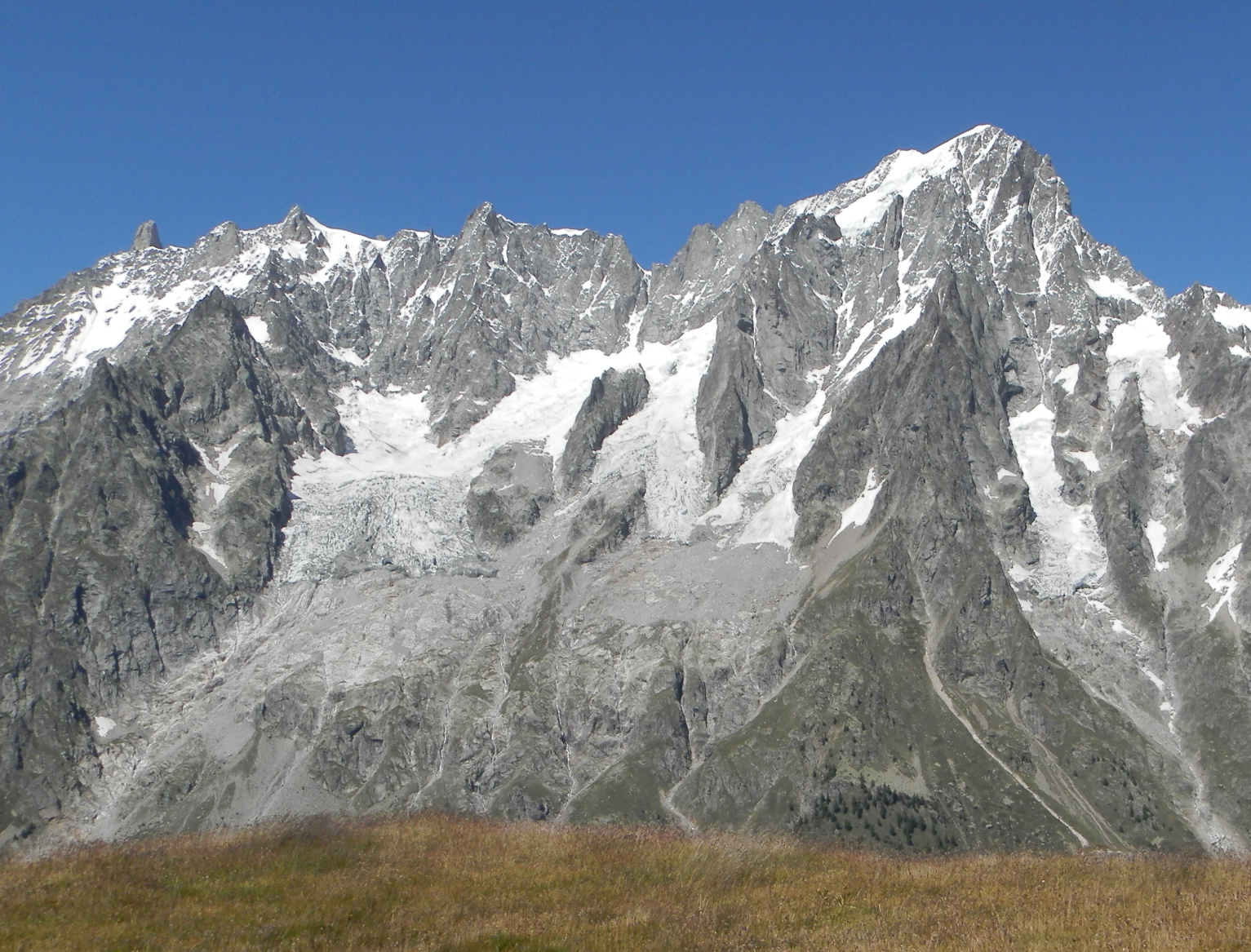
- South slope of the Grandes Jorasses, with the Planpincieux Glacier on the left

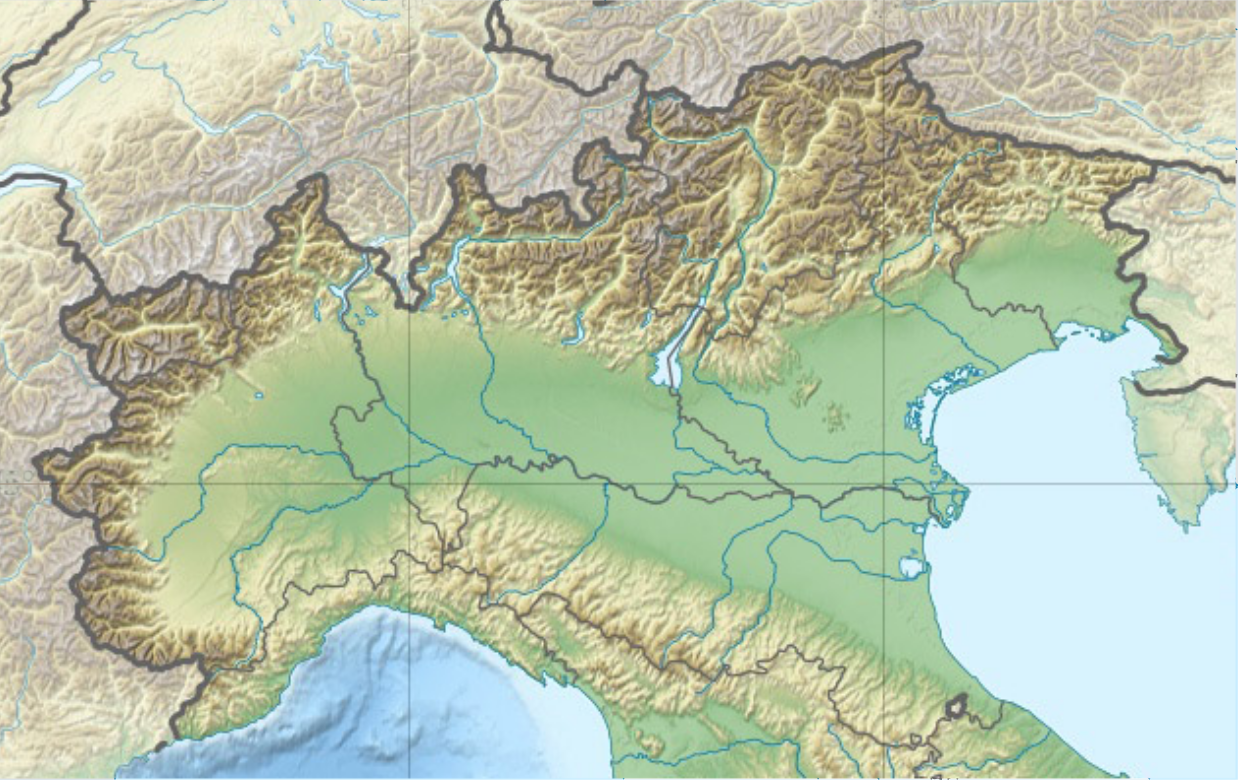
- Location within Alps Location within Northern Italy
- Interactive map of Planpincieux Glacier
- Type: Hanging glacier, cirque glacier, temperate glacier
- Location: Southern slopes of the Mont Blanc massif
- Coordinates: 45°51′27″N 6°58′24″E
- Area: 1.327 km^{2} (0.512 sq mi)
- Length: 2.45 km (1.52 mi)=

The Planpincieux Glacier (French: Glacier de Planpincieux, Italian: Ghiacciaio di Planpincieux) is a hanging glacier, located on the southern slopes of the Grandes Jorasses in the Mont Blanc massif of the Alps. It is located above the hamlet of Planpincieux, Val Ferret, in the Aosta Valley. The glacier has a length of 2 km (1.2 mi) and covers an area of 1.008 km^{2} (0.389 sq mi), and its elevation ranges from 2640 to 3680 m at a slope of 30°. Thermally, it is a temperate glacier.

Over the years, several ice avalanches and glacial outburst floods have occurred that posed a threat to the hamlet of Planpincieux at the bottom of the valley. The glacier has been closely monitored since 2013, and the registered displacement rate in the summer period varies between 30 and 50 cm per day.

An acceleration in the displacement rate of the glacier occurred in September 2019, and experts warned that approximately 250,000 cubic metres of ice could break away from the glacier. On 24 September 2019, the mayor of Courmayeur ordered the closure of roads and an evacuation of the population in the risk area beneath the glacier. The immediate danger subsided with the arrival of cooler autumn weather.

On 5 August 2020, the access roads to Val Feret were closed once again, and some 75 people were evacuated, after experts warned that some 500,000 cubic metres of the glacier could break away.

== See also ==
- Portal:Alps
