= Florence Crauford Grove =

English mountaineer and author (1838–1902)

Florence Crauford Grove (12 March 1838 – 17 August 1902) was an English mountaineer and author, sometimes known as F. Crauford Grove. He led the first expedition to ascend the higher summit of Mount Elbrus and was at one time president of the Alpine Club.

== Mountaineer ==
Grove became an experienced alpinist in the late 1850s and joined the Alpine Club of London soon after it was formed in 1857, later serving as its president from 1884 to 1886. He was one of the best British climbers of his day and is remembered for opposing guideless climbing during the 1870s. An article on the founders of the Alpine Club in the Oxford Dictionary of National Biography calls him a "gentleman traveller of independent means".

Because of his first name, Grove is sometimes mistakenly thought to have been a woman. His second name is Crauford.

== First ascents ==
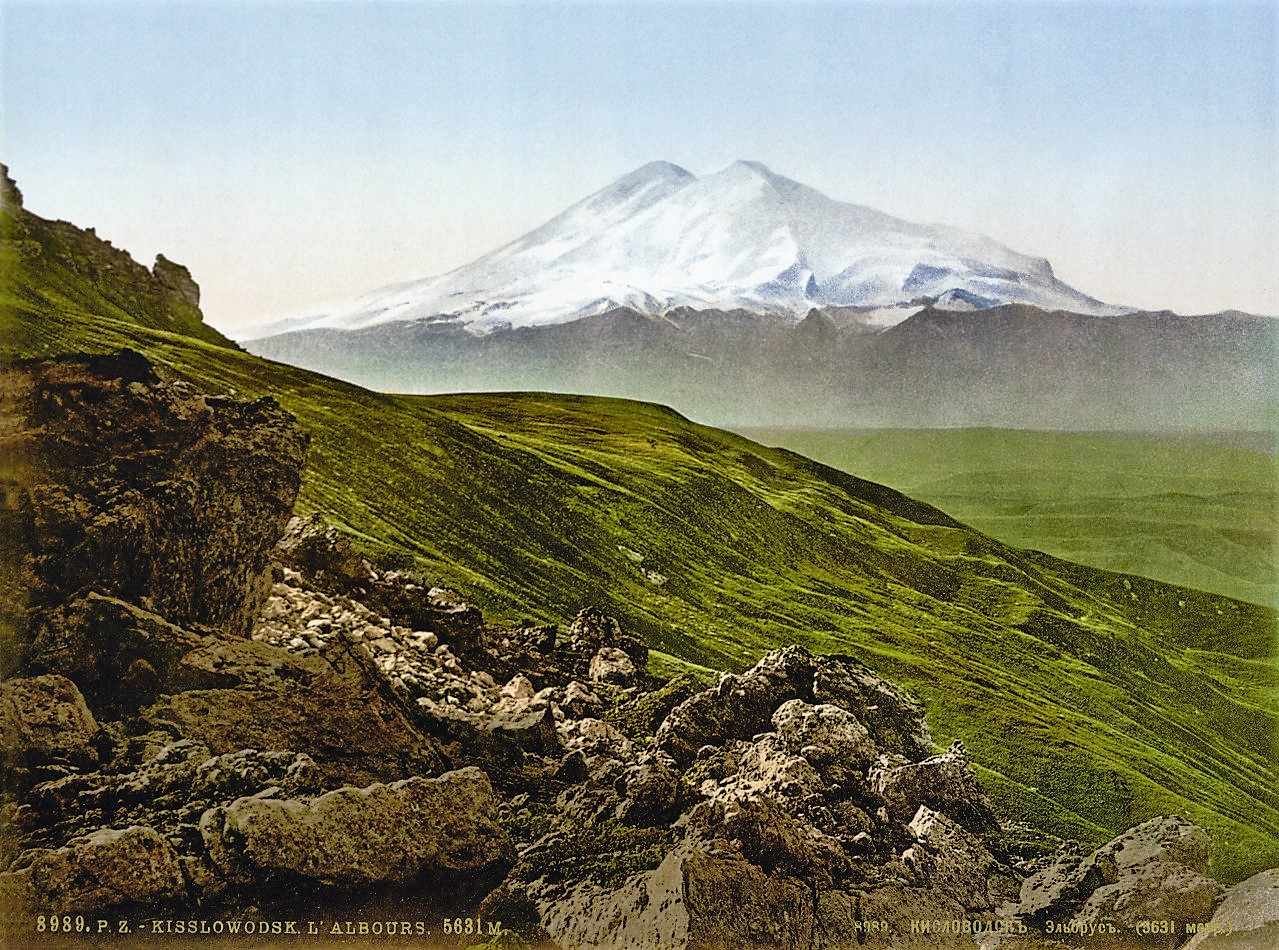
Mount Elbrus in the Caucasus Mountains, the highest mountain in Europe

- 12 August 1863: Dent d'Hérens (4,171 m) with Reginald S. Macdonald, Montagu Woodmass and William Edward Hall and guides Melchior Anderegg and Peter Perren
- 16 August 1863: Parrotspitze (4,432 m) with the same party (Reginald S. Macdonald, Montagu Woodmass, William Edward Hall, guides Melchior Anderegg and Peter Perren)
- 22 August 1864: Zinalrothorn (4,221 m), with Leslie Stephen and guides Jakob Anderegg and Melchior Anderegg
- 28 July 1865: Aiguille de Bionnassay (4,052 m), with E. Buxton and R.Macdonald, and guides J.Cachet and M.Payne.
- 1874: West summit of Mount Elbrus (5,642 m), first ascent led by Grove, with Frederick Gardiner, Horace Walker, their guides Peter Knubel. The west summit is forty metres higher than the east summit.

== Publications ==
A first edition of The Frosty Caucasus

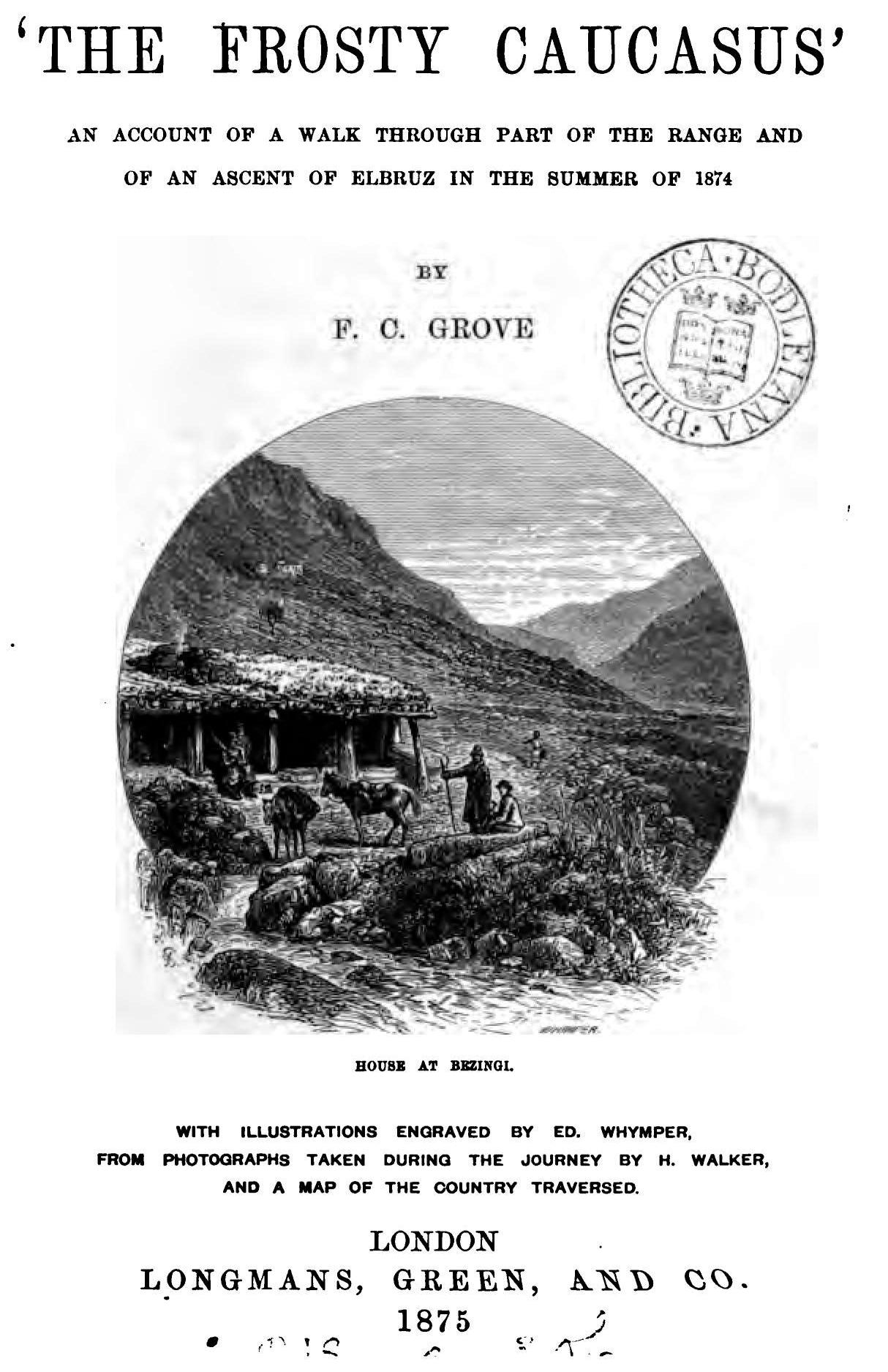
The Frosty Caucasus, front page

- The Frosty Caucasus: an account of a walk through part of the Range and of an ascent of Elbruz in the summer of 1874 (London, Longmans, Green & Co, 1875, 341 pp.)

Grove's book is illustrated with six plates by Edward Whymper, from photographs by Horace Walker, and a folding map. Chapters cover the Upper Rion, the valley of the Upper Tcherek river, the Bezingi glacier and the Kotchan Tau Group (both in Kabardino-Balkaria, Russia), Tchegem and the Gorge of the Djilki-Su, Urusbieh, the first ascent of Mount Elbruz (in Kabardino-Balkaria and Karachay–Cherkessia), and the Nakhar Pass (in Georgia).

The Frosty Caucasus was republished in a facsimile edition by Adamant Media Corporation in February 2002 (ISBN 978-1402184468).

The title of the book is taken from William Shakespeare's play Richard II -

O, who can hold a fire in his hand
By thinking on the frosty Caucasus?

== See also ==
- Golden age of alpinism
