= Rinderhorn =

Mountain in Switzerland

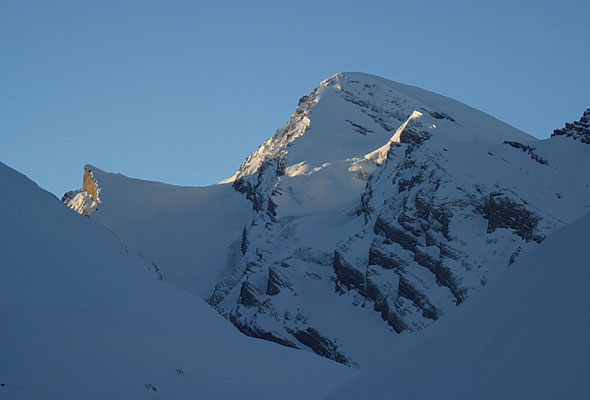

Highest point
- Elevation: 3,449 m (11,316 ft)
- Prominence: 414 m (1,358 ft)
- Parent peak: Balmhorn
- Isolation: 2.4 km (1.5 mi)
- Listing: Alpine mountains above 3000 m
- Coordinates: 46°24′48.8″N 7°39′12.6″E

Geography
- Location within Switzerland
- Location: Valais, Switzerland
- Parent range: Bernese Alps

The Rinderhorn is a mountain of the Bernese Alps, overlooking Leukerbad in the canton of Valais. It lies east of Gemmi Pass on the chain culminating at the Balmhorn.
