= Trifthorn =

Mountain in Switzerland

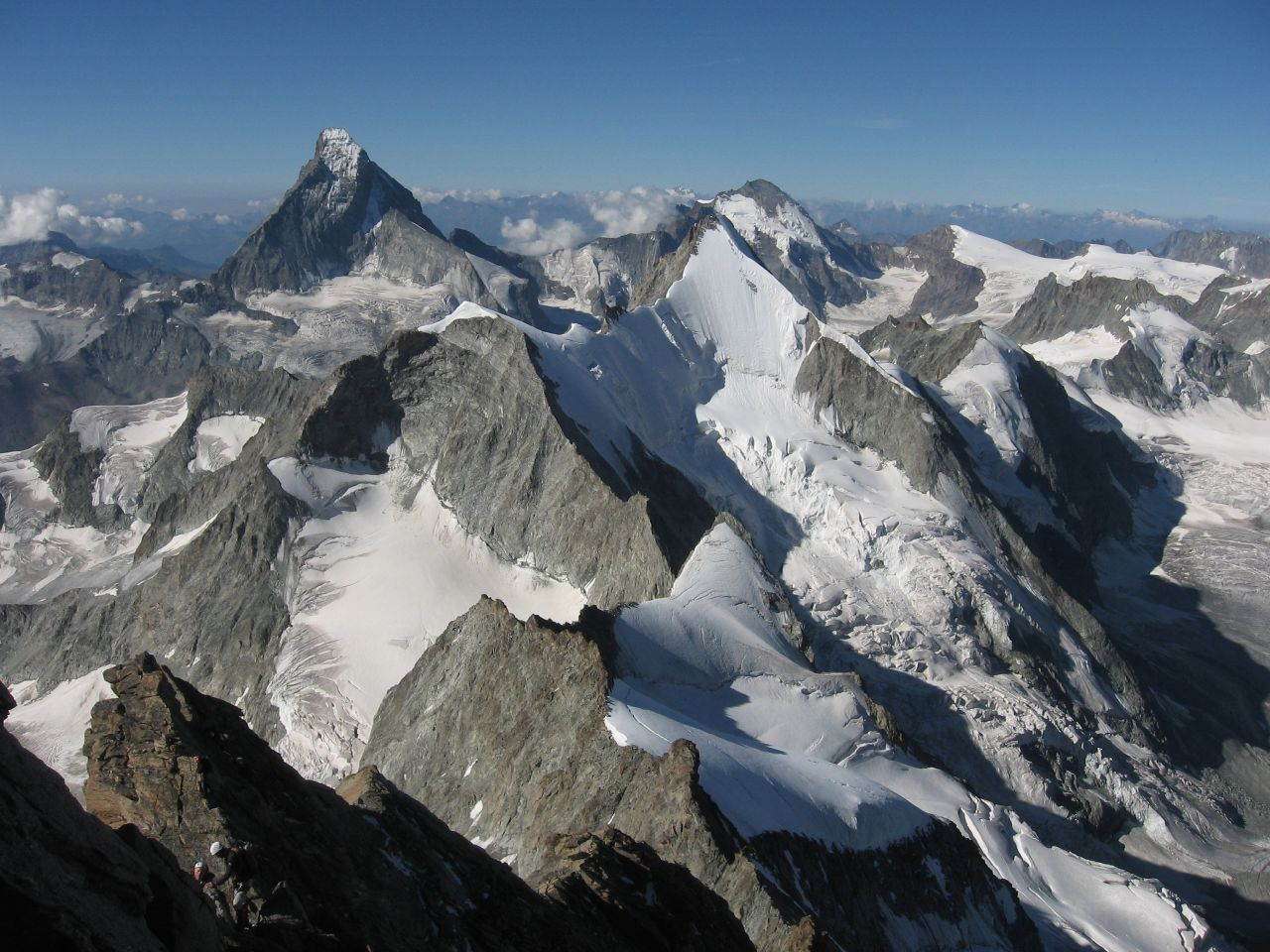
- View from the Zinalrothorn. The Trifthorn is the snowy peak on the lower part of the image.

Highest point
- Elevation: 3,728 m (12,231 ft)
- Prominence: 70 m (230 ft)
- Parent peak: Zinalrothorn
- Coordinates: 46°03′05.5″N 7°40′42″E

Geography
- Location within Switzerland
- Location: Valais, Switzerland
- Parent range: Pennine Alps

The Trifthorn is a mountain of the Swiss Pennine Alps, located west of Zermatt in the canton of Valais. It is located in the middle of the ridge connecting the Ober Gabelhorn from the Zinalrothorn.
