= Balmhorn =

Mountain in Switzerland

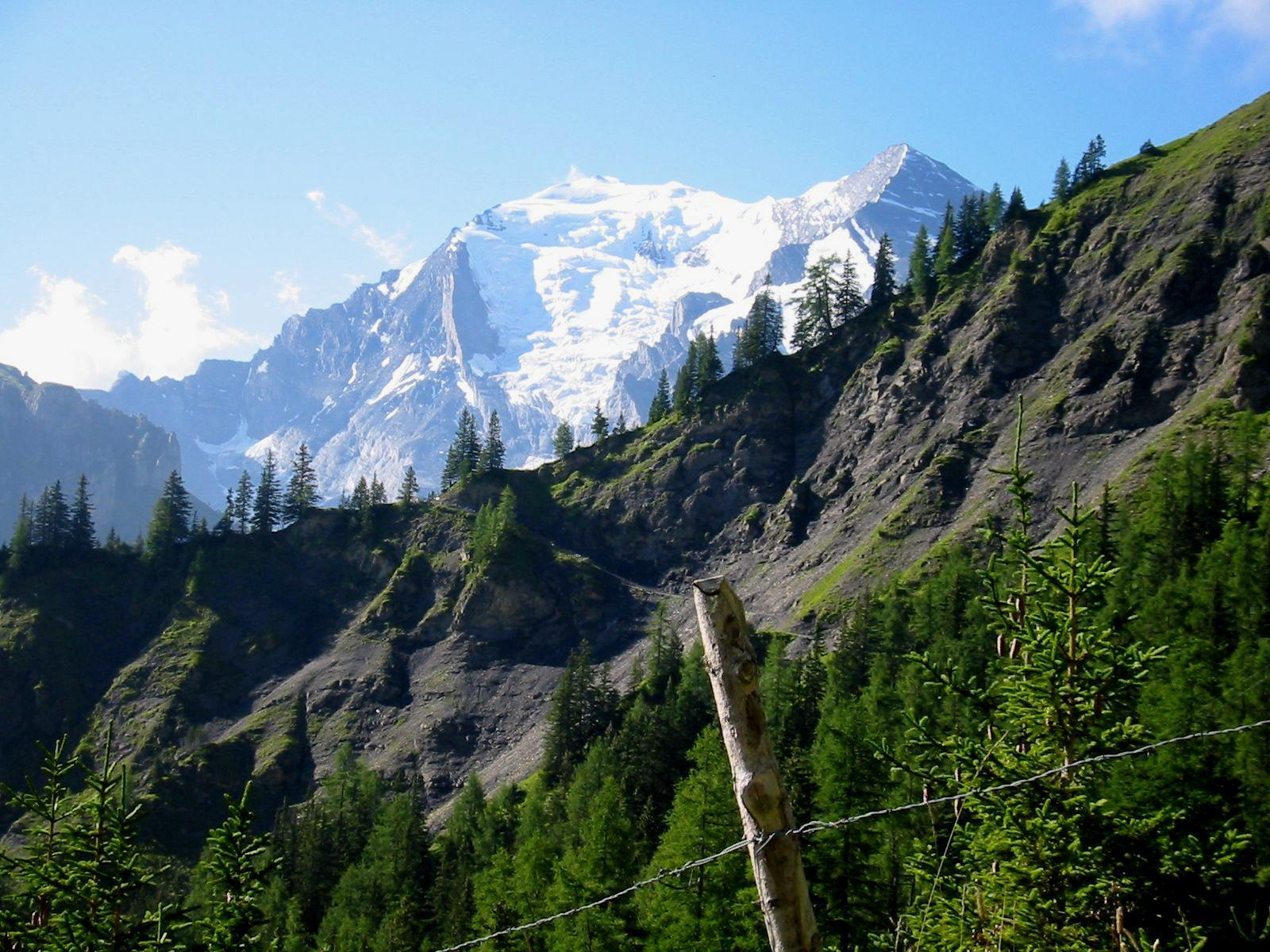
- View of the Balmhorn from Allmenalp, above Kandersteg

Highest point
- Elevation: 3,697 m (12,129 ft)
- Prominence: 1,020 m (3,350 ft)
- Parent peak: Finsteraarhorn
- Isolation: 12.3 km (7.6 mi)
- Listing: Alpine mountains above 3000 m
- Coordinates: 46°25′30″N 7°41′37″E

Geography
- Location within Switzerland
- Location: Bern/Valais, Switzerland
- Parent range: Bernese Alps

Climbing
- First ascent: 21 July 1864 by Frank Walker, Horace Walker and Lucy Walker, with guides Jakob Anderegg and Melchior Anderegg
- Easiest route: South-west ridge (Zackengrat)

The Balmhorn (3,697 m) is a mountain in the Bernese Alps in Switzerland. Its summit ridge lies on the border between the cantons of Bern and the Valais.

It was first climbed by Frank Walker, Horace Walker and Lucy Walker, with guides Jakob Anderegg and Melchior Anderegg on 21 July 1864.

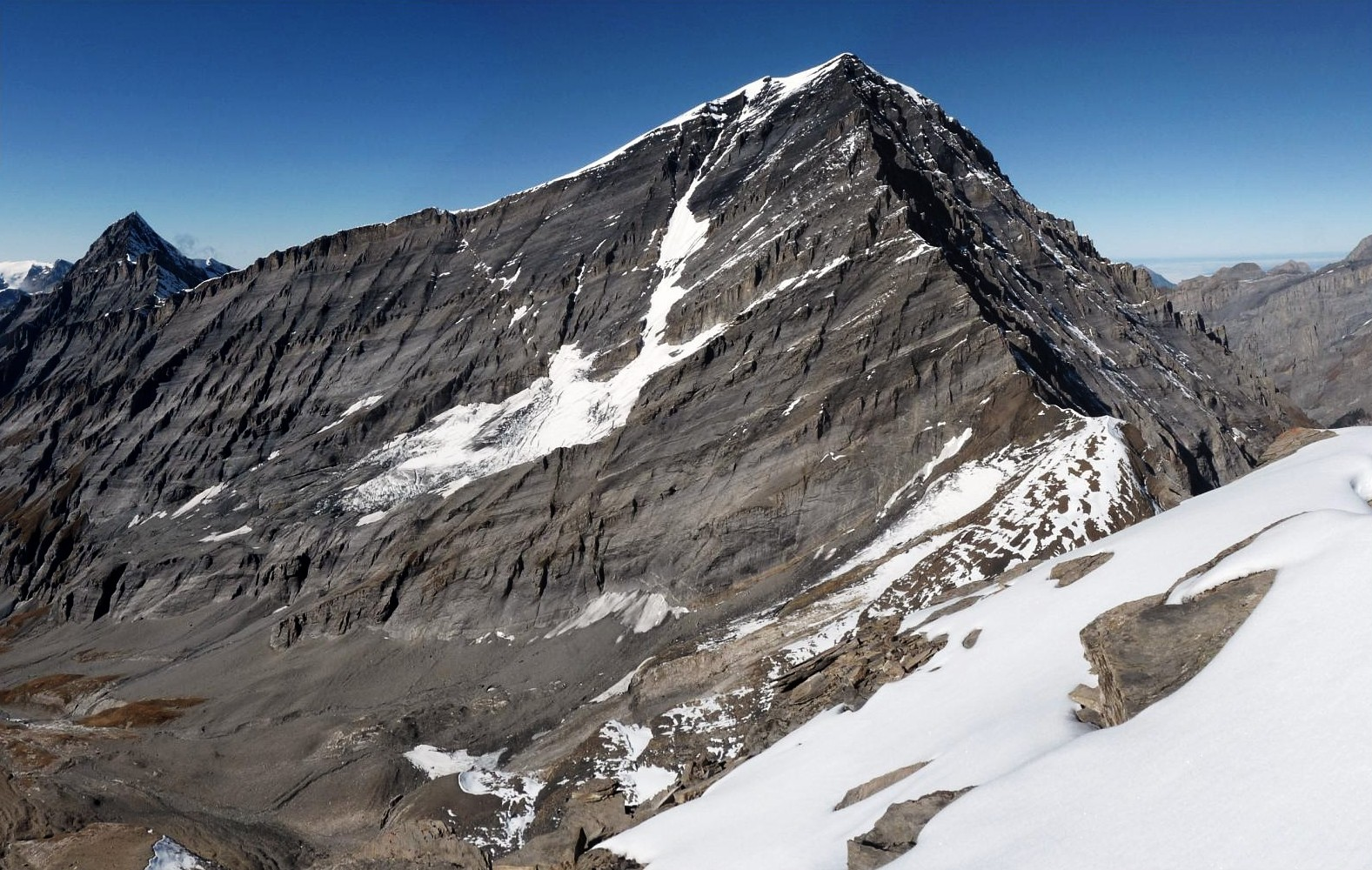
The southern flanks of the Rinderhorn and Balmhorn seen from the Ferdenrothorn

== Huts ==
- Balmhornhütte
- Lötschenpasshütte
- Berghotel Schwarenbach

== See also ==
- List of mountains of Switzerland
- List of mountains of the canton of Bern
- List of mountains of Valais
- List of most isolated mountains of Switzerland
