= Dent Blanche =

Mountain in the Pennine Alps in Valais Canton, Switzerland

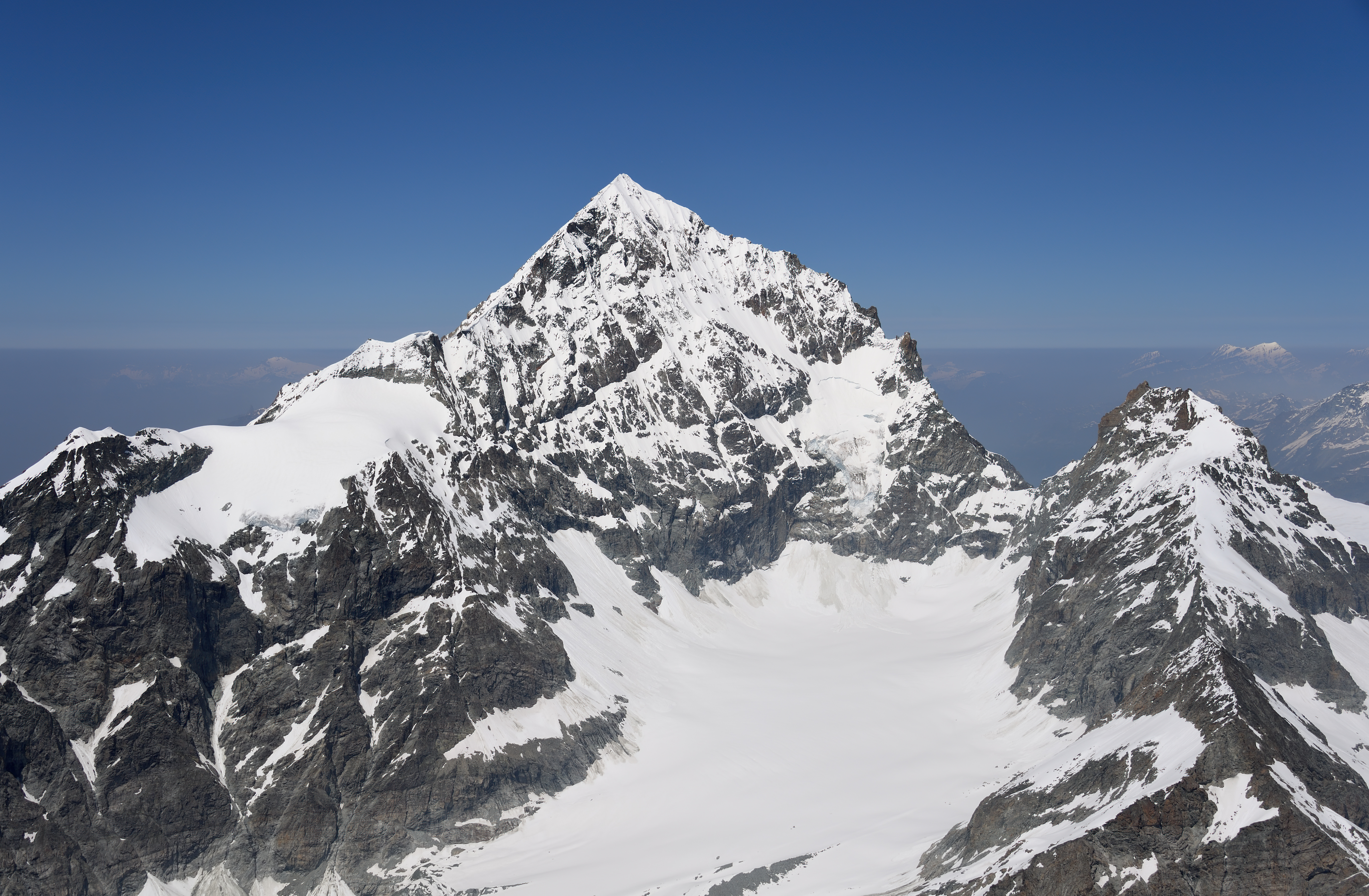
- Aerial view of Dent Blanche from the south

Highest point
- Elevation: 4,357 m (14,295 ft)
- Prominence: 916 m ↓ Wandfluejoch
- Parent peak: Matterhorn
- Isolation: 7.2 km → Matterhorn
- Coordinates: 46°02′03″N 7°36′43″E

Geography
- Location within Switzerland
- Location: Valais, Switzerland
- Parent range: Pennine Alps

Climbing
- First ascent: 1862
- Easiest route: rock/snow/ice climb

The Dent Blanche is a mountain in the Pennine Alps, lying in the canton of Valais in Switzerland. At 4,357 m (14,295 ft)-high, it is one of the highest peaks in the Alps.

== Naming ==
The original name was probably Dent d'Hérens, the current name of the nearby Dent d'Hérens which does not overlook the Val d'Hérens. The nearby north face of the Dent d'Hérens is glaciated while the Dent Blanche holds much less snow, it was even called Dent Noire (Black Tooth) on the Woerl Atlas of 1842. In fact on older maps, in the area where both summits lie, only the name Weisszahnhorn (from German: White Tooth Peak) was given, the French name (Dent Blanche) only appearing in 1820. Because cartographers usually made their observations far from the mountainous remote areas and also because the Dent d'Hérens is sometimes hidden behind the Dent Blanche thus less visible, the latter received the name. The inhabitants of the lower Val d'Hérens called the current Dent d'Hérens, Dent Blanche, but the ones of the upper Val d'Hérens called the mountain, Dent de Rong or Dent d'Erins, contributing to the general confusion. The contemporary names are official since the completion of the Dufour map in 1862.

== Geography ==
South-west face of Dent Blanche

North-west face with the west ridge (Arête de Ferpècle)

The summit of Dent Blanche is an important geographic place as it is the converging point of three ridges. The three valleys separated by them are the Val d'Hérens, Val d'Anniviers and Mattertal. The respective villages of Evolène, Zinal and Zermatt lie approximatively at the same distance of the mountain.

The Dent Blanche has four steep faces rising over four glaciers: The north-east face (also called north face) rises above the Grand Cornier Glacier (part of the Zinal Glacier), the south-east face rises above the Schönbiel Glacier (part of the Zmutt Glacier), the south-west face rises above the Manzettes Glacier (part of the Ferpècle Glacier) and, finally, the north-west face of Dent Blanche rises above the homonym glacier.

The four ridges encompass almost exactly the four cardinal directions. The west ridge is named Arête de Ferpècle and the east ridge is named Arête des Quatre Ânes. The Col de la Dent Blanche (3,531 m) lies at the foot of the northern ridge, the Bivouac de la Dent Blanche is located there. The Dent Blanche Hut lies at the foot of the southern ridge which is used as the normal route. The grade of the route is AD (III+).

The region around Dent Blanche consists of many 4000 metres peaks. The Ober Gabelhorn (west), Dent d'Hérens and Matterhorn (south) are the closest high summits.

== Climbing history ==
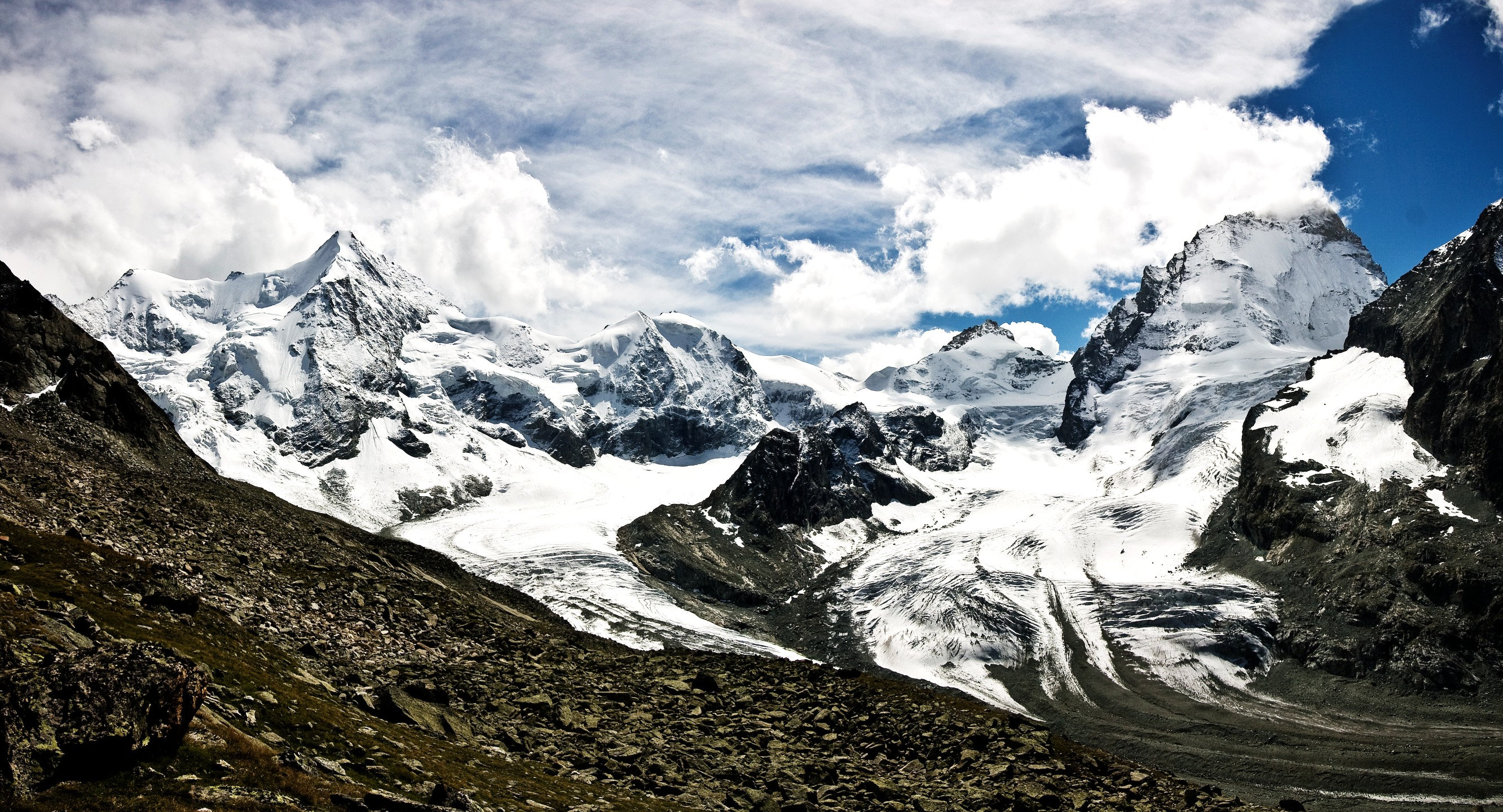
Panorama from the Grand Mountet Hut with the Dent Blanche north face on the far right, the summit on the left is the Ober Gabelhorn

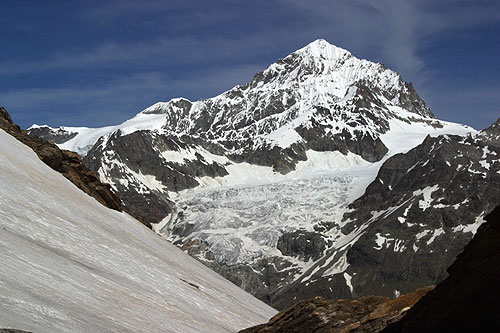
The south-east face and the southern ridge (normal route) on the left

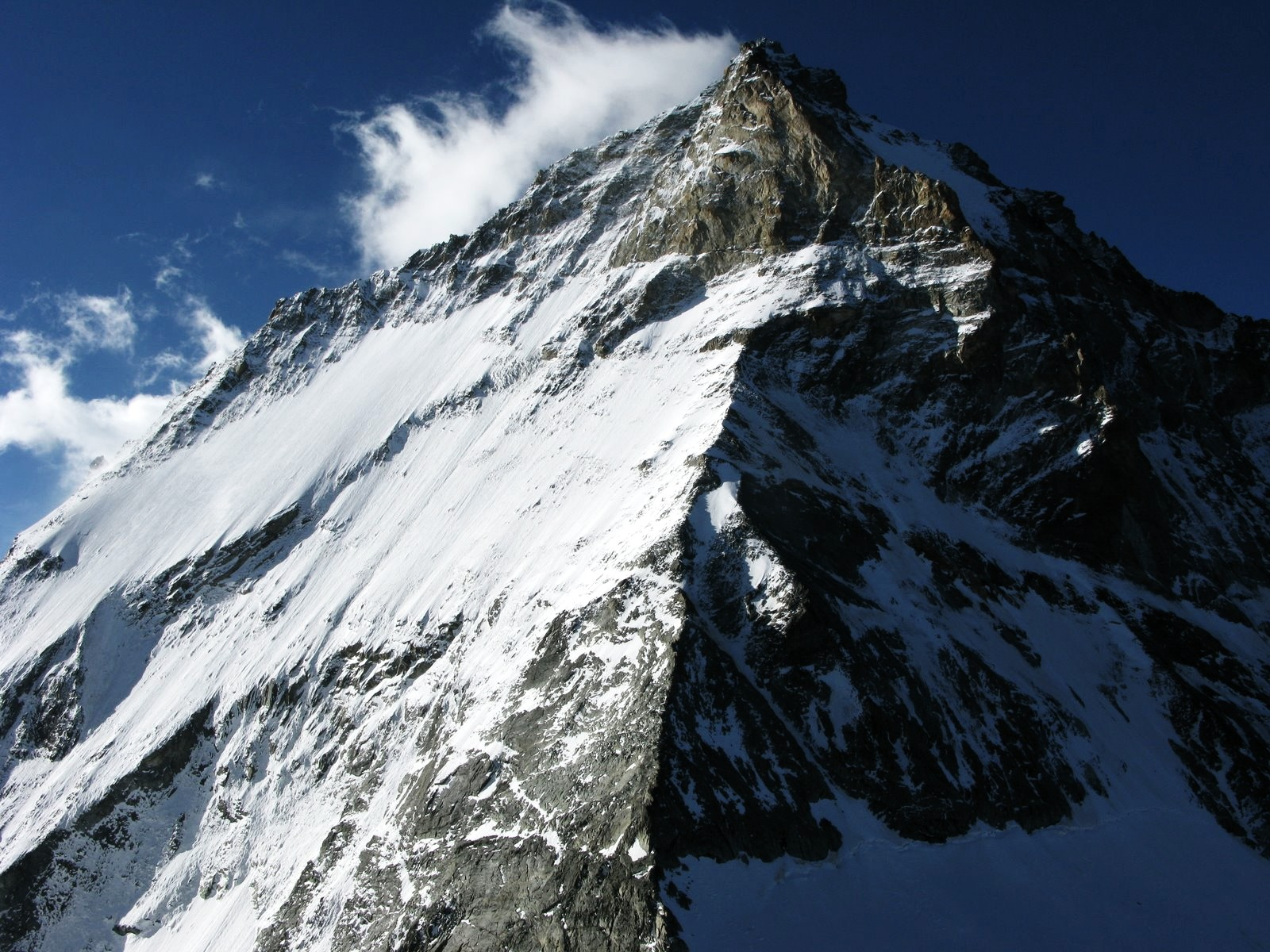
The north ridge of Dent Blanche

The first ascent was made via the south ridge (Wandfluegrat), which is the less difficult route to the summit and the actual normal route. On 12 July 1862, T. S. Kennedy, after an attempt on the east face of the unconquered Matterhorn, almost reached the summit with the guides Peter Taugwalder and his son. But after a minor accident, Peter Taugwalder refused to go any higher. Kennedy would finally reach the summit only a few days later, on July 18, 1862, with W. Wigram, J. Croz and J. Konig, despite adverse weather conditions.

A route on the east ridge was opened on 11 August 1882 by John Stafford Anderson and G. P. Baker, with guides Alois Pollinger of St. Niklaus in the canton Valais and Ulrich Almer. They started from the Mountet Hut and arrived at the summit after a difficult 12 hours climbing on a dangerous ridge overlooking the north face. Almer said on the summit, "We are four asses", and the ridge was then named Arête des Quatre Ânes or Viereselsgrat (Ridge of the Four Asses).

The north ridge was explored in 1899. On 28 August O. G. Jones, F. W. Hill with guides E. Furrer, C. Zurbriggen and J. Vuignier headed to the summit but they fell and only Hill survived. He reached alone the summit and a storm forced him to make a bivouac. He could report the news of the fatal accident in Zermatt only two days later.

The first ascent of the north north west ridge – described as "one of the last great problems" of the Pennine Alps – was by Dorothy Pilley Richards and I. A. Richards with Joseph Georges and Antoine Georges on 20 July 1928. Dorothy Pilley Richards later wrote up the ascent in her mountaineering memoir, Climbing Days (1935).

The first ascent of the north face is attributed to K. Schneider and F. Singer on 26 and 27 August 1932. They climbed from the left part at the base of the face to the summit. Only on 12 July 1966, Michel and Yvette Vaucher made a direct ascent on the north face.

The first winter ascent by the north ridge was completed by P. Crettaz and J. Gaudin on March 2, 1963.

A solo winter ascent on the north face was made for the first time in 1968 by C. Bournissen.

== See also ==
- List of 4000 metre peaks of the Alps
