= Lucy Walker (climber) =

British mountaineer

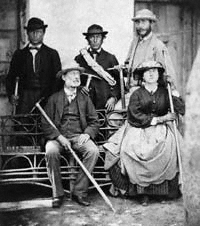
- 1871 portrait of Lucy Walker, seated, with her father Frank Walker, and (standing, left to right) unknown, Melchior Anderegg, and Adolphus Warburton Moore.
- Born: c. 1836
- Died: 10 September 1916; Liverpool, England
- Known for: First woman to climb the Matterhorn
- Relatives: Horace Walker (brother)

Lucy Walker (c. 1836 – 10 September 1916) was a British mountaineer and the first woman to climb the Matterhorn.

Walker was born in 1836, in British North America, in what would later become Canada. Her mother, Jane McNeil McMurdo, moved from Scotland to North America with her husband and infant daughter in 1836. Mrs McMurdo left her husband to live with Francis (Frank) Walker; Lucy Walker and her brother Horace were born before their parents moved to England. The McMurdos divorced in 1841, and Frank Walker and Jane McMurdo married on 24 April 1841. The family then moved to Liverpool, England, where Frank Walker became a lead merchant. Walker began her climbing rather modestly in 1858 when she was advised by her doctor to take up walking as a cure for rheumatism. Accompanied by her father Frank Walker and her brother Horace Walker, both of whom were early members of the Alpine Club, and Oberland guide Melchior Anderegg, she became the first woman to regularly climb in the Alps.

Walker's achievements were, at first, largely unnoticed except by those in her immediate company. Early successes included the first ascent of the Balmhorn (1864), and the first female ascent of the Eiger (1864), Wetterhorn (1866), and Piz Bernina (1869). In 1871 her long-standing guide, Melchior Anderegg, learned that a contemporary Meta Brevoort, an American female mountaineer, was planning an expedition to climb the Matterhorn. Walker's party hastily rearranged their plans and on 21 July, she became the first woman to stand atop the Matterhorn, and with it gained world renown. As well as the Eiger she had already been the first woman to climb the Aiguille Verte (1870), Lyskam (1868), Gross Fiescherhorn (1868), Schreckhorn (1867), Weisshorn (1866), Dom (1866), Rimpfischhorn (1864), Grand Combin (1864), Zumsteinspitze (1863), Finsteraarhorn (1862) and the Strahlhorn (1860). In 1873 she added the Taschhorn to this enviable list of first ascents.

In all Lucy Walker completed a total of 98 expeditions. In 1909 she became a member of the newly formed Ladies' Alpine Club where she was acclaimed as the pioneer of women climbers. In 1913 she was elected its second President and served in that capacity until 1915. She died at her home in Liverpool on 10 September 1916.

She is included on Zermatt's 'Walk of Climb' which includes 11 alpinists who were the first to climb the Matterhorn. Her sidewalk plaque says "Lucy Walker/1836-1916/Erste Frau Auf Dem Matterhorn/22.Juli 1871."

== See also ==
- Annie Smith Peck
- Frederica Plunket
