= Zinal =

- Former municipality
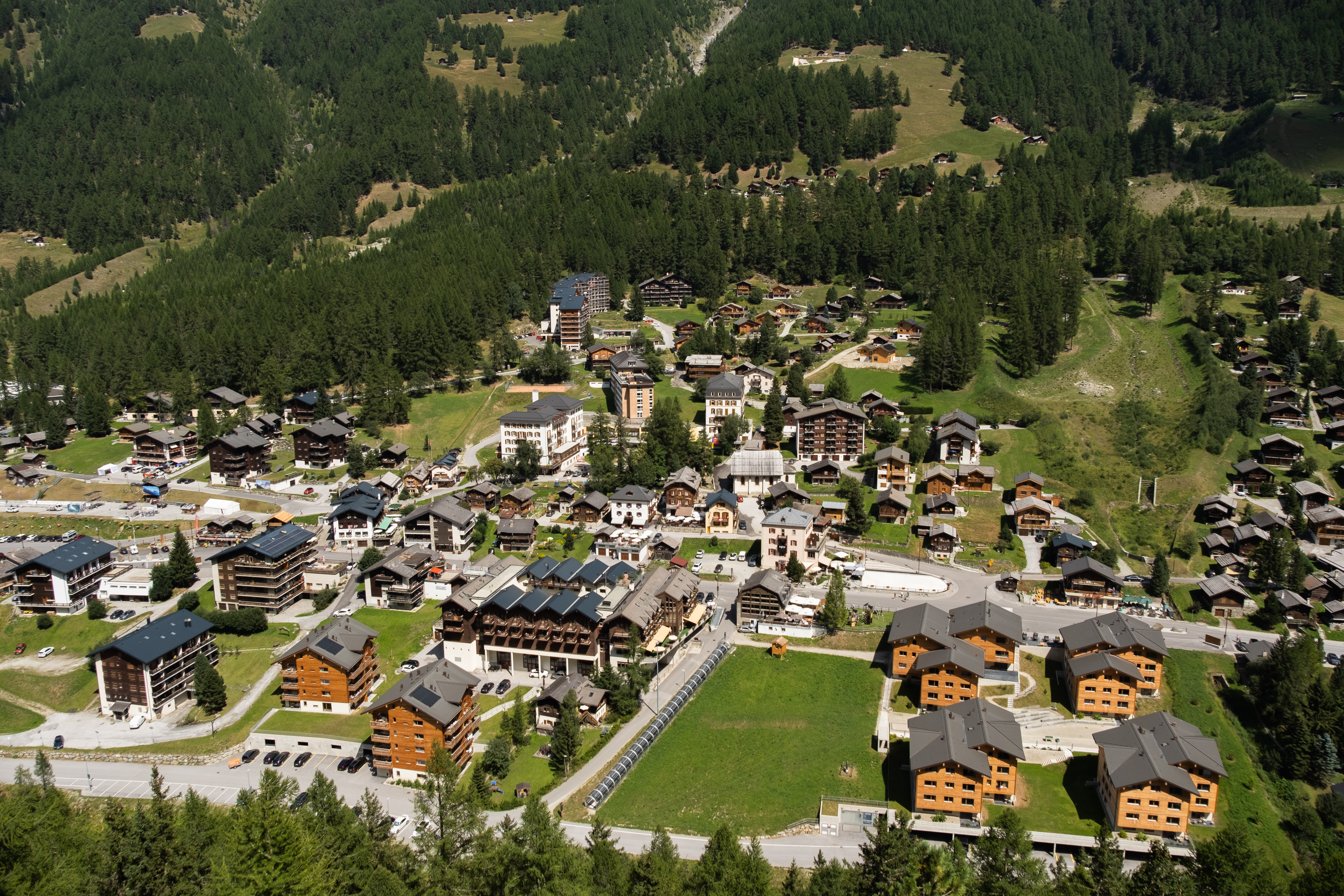
- Location of Zinal
- Location within Switzerland Location within Canton of Valais
- Coordinates: 46°08′N 7°37′E
- Country: Switzerland
- Canton: Valais
- District: Sierre
- Municipality: Anniviers

Area
  - Total: 0 km^{2} (0 sq mi)
- Elevation: 1,675 m (5,495 ft)
- Time zone: UTC+01:00 (CET)
  - Summer (DST): UTC+02:00 (CEST)
- ISO 3166 code: CH-VS
- Website

Zinal is a village in Switzerland, located in the municipality of Anniviers in the canton of Valais. It lies at an elevation of 1,675 metres (5,495 ft) above sea level in the Swiss Alps in the Val de Zinal, a valley running from the Zinal Glacier, north of Dent Blanche to the village of Ayer, part of the Val d'Anniviers. With the Dent Blanche, four additional 4,000-metre (13,120 ft) peaks are located around the valley: Bishorn, Weisshorn, Zinalrothorn, and Ober Gabelhorn.

== Tourism ==
The village is a typical Swiss ski resort with 120 km (75 mi) (linked with Grimentz since 2013 to form a greater skiing area) of ski slopes and 19.5 km (12.1 mi) of cross-country skiing. In summer the area has 300 km (190 mi) of marked trails and some mountain huts such as the Grand Mountet Hut in the middle of glaciers.

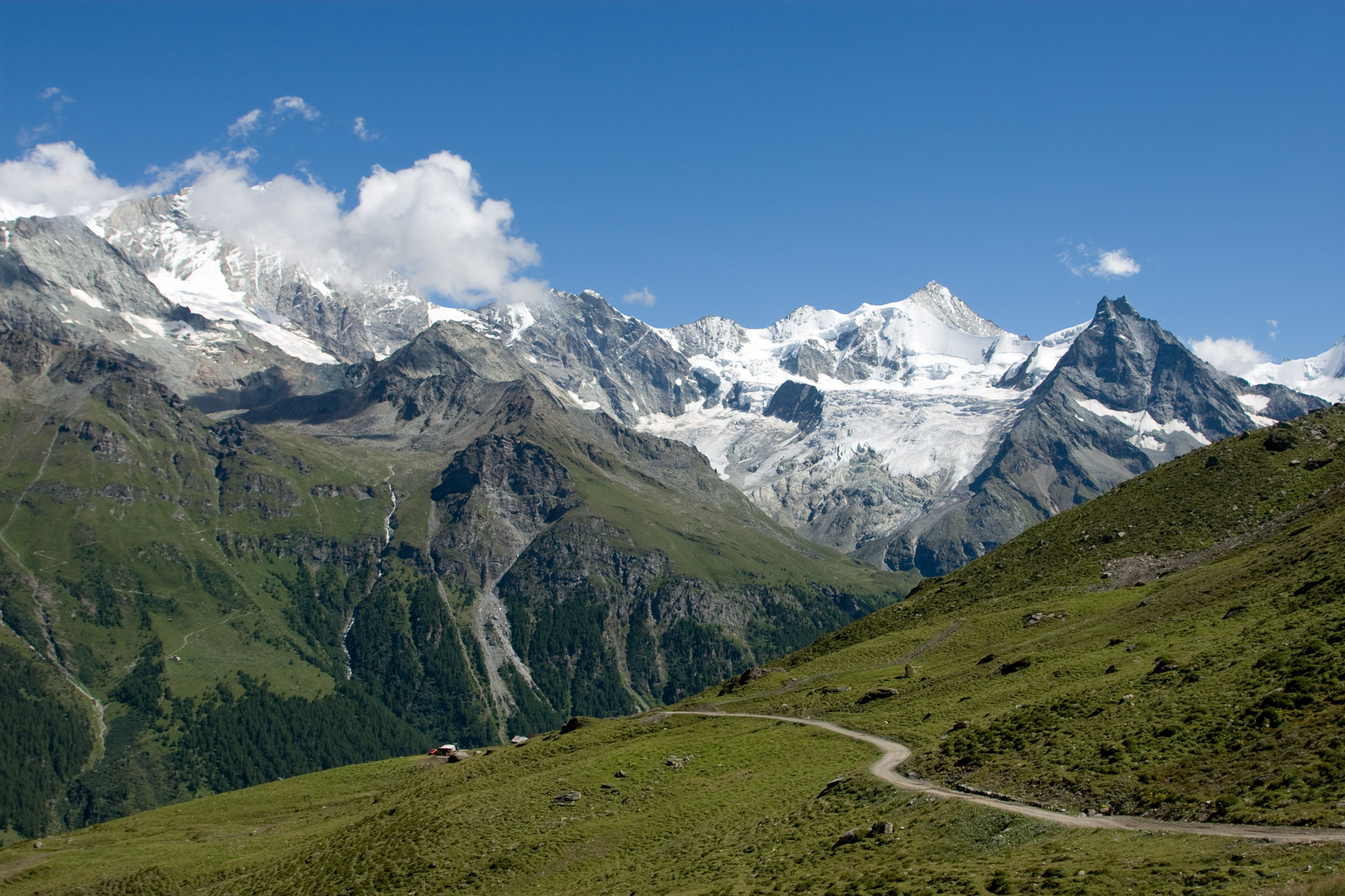
View from Sorebois
