= Horace Walker =

English mountaineer (1838–1908)

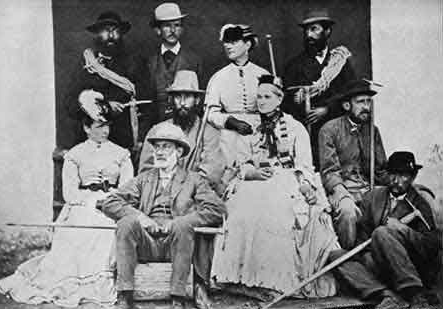
Horace Walker (sitting, 3rd from left), Lucy Walker (standing, 3rd from left), A. W. Moore (sitting, 2nd from right) and Melchior Anderegg (standing, far right)

Horace Walker (1838–1908) was an English mountaineer who made many notable first ascents, including Mount Elbrus and the Grandes Jorasses.

== Alpinism ==
Born in 1838, Walker was the son of Liverpool lead merchant and mountaineer Francis Walker (1808–1872) and brother of Lucy Walker (1836–1916), the first woman to climb the Matterhorn.

Walker was President of the Alpine Club in 1891–1893.

== Commemoration ==
The Horace Walker glacier and Horace Walker hut in the Southern Alps of New Zealand are named after him.

In commemoration of his first ascent of the Grandes Jorasses on 30 June 1868, Walker gives his name to Pointe Walker (4,208 m), the highest summit of the mountain; this lends its name to the Walker Spur, the most well-known buttress on the north face and one of the great north faces of the Alps.

== First ascents ==
- Barre des Écrins with A. W. Moore and Edward Whymper, and guides Michel Croz, Christian Almer the elder, and Christian Almer the younger on 25 June 1864
- Balmhorn (Bernese Alps) with Frank Walker and Lucy Walker, and guides Jakob Anderegg and Melchior Anderegg on 21 July 1864
- Piz Roseg (Bernina Alps) with A. W. Moore, and the guide Jakob Anderegg on 28 June 1865

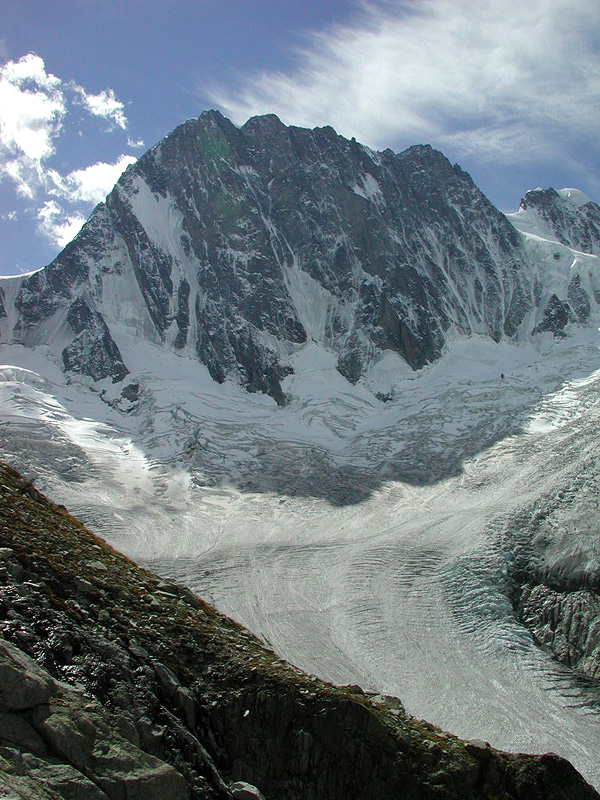
The Grandes Jorasses. Pointe Walker is the highest summit, at the top of the Walker Spur (the first major buttress from the left)

- Ober Gabelhorn (Pennine Alps) with A. W. Moore, and Jakob Anderegg on 6 July 1865
- Pigne d'Arolla (Pennine Alps) with A. W. Moore, and Jakob Anderegg on 9 July 1865
- Brenva Spur on Mont Blanc with George Spencer Mathews, A. W. Moore, Francis Walker, and the guides Jakob Anderegg and Melchior Anderegg on 15 July 1865
- Grandes Jorasses (Mont Blanc Massif) with guides Melchior Anderegg, Johann Jaun and Julien Grange on 30 June 1868
- Mount Elbrus (Main West Peak, 5642 m) (Caucasus) with F. Crauford Grove, Frederick Gardiner and the guides Peter Knubel of St. Niklaus in the canton Valais and Ahiya Sottaiev in 1874
