= Ober Gabelhorn =

Mountain in the Pennine Alps in Switzerland

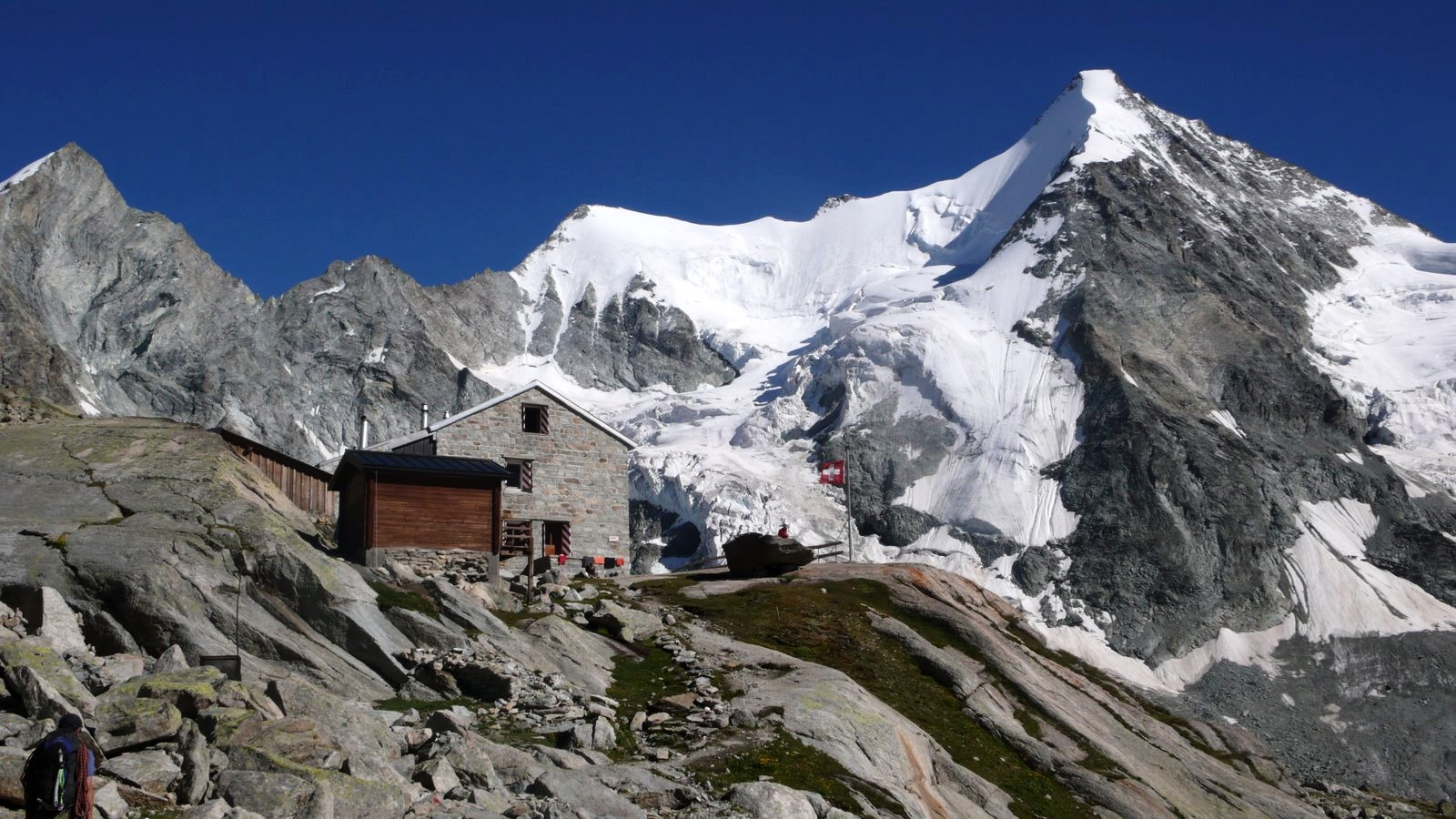
- The Obergabelhorn and the Grand Mountet Hut. The north face lies in shade to the left of the summit.

Highest point
- Elevation: 4,063 m (13,330 ft)
- Prominence: 536 m (1,759 ft)
- Parent peak: Weisshorn
- Isolation: 3.2 km (2.0 mi)
- Coordinates: 46°02′18″N 7°40′04″E

Geography
- Location within Switzerland
- Location: Valais, Switzerland
- Parent range: Pennine Alps

Climbing
- First ascent: 6 July 1865 by A. W. Moore, Horace Walker and Jakob Anderegg
- Easiest route: Wellenkuppe and north-east ridge. Basic snow climb, then mixed. AD-.

The Ober Gabelhorn (4063 m) is a mountain in the Pennine Alps in Switzerland, located between Zermatt and Zinal.

== Geography ==
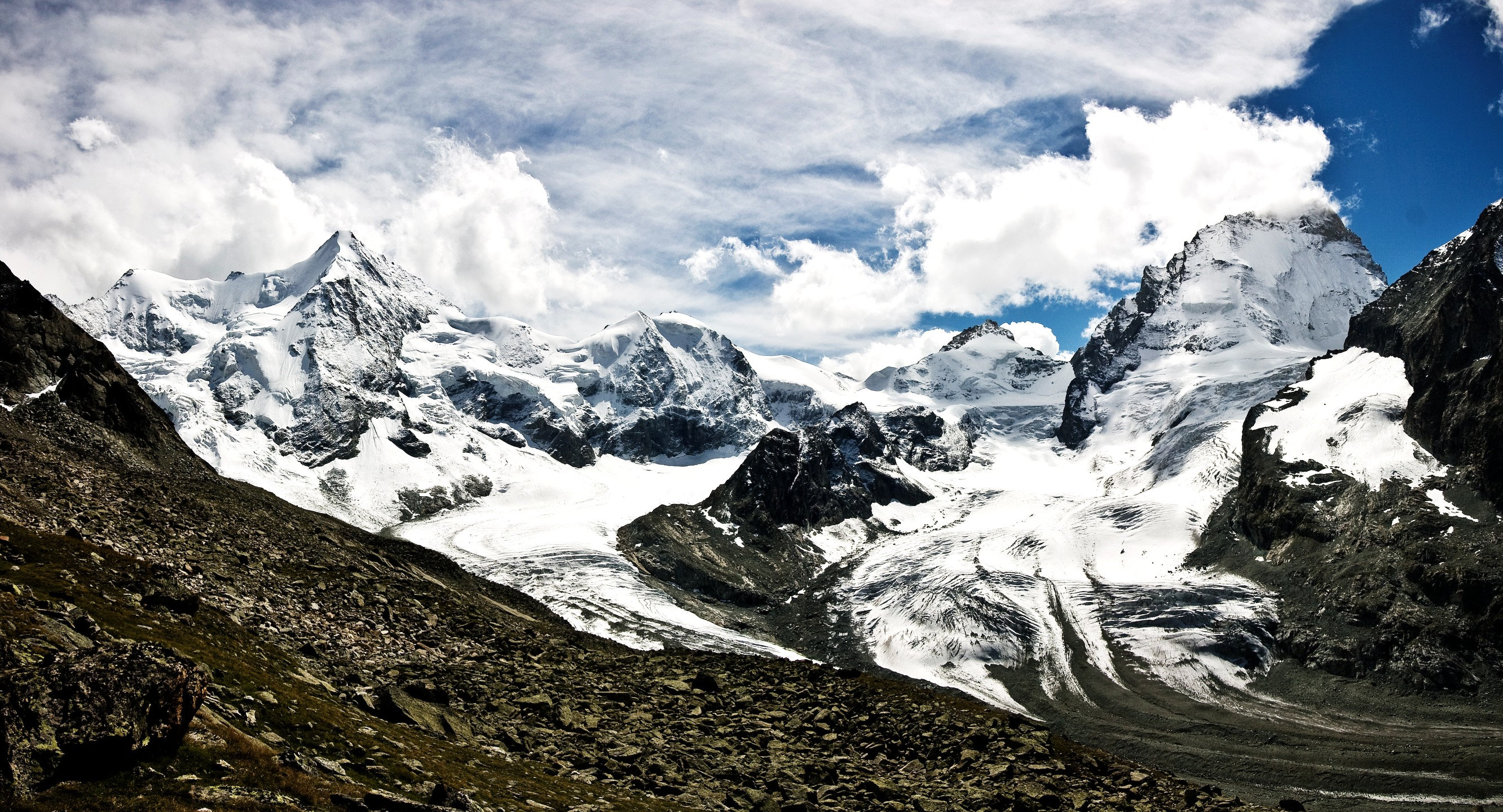
Panorama with the Ober Gabelhorn (left) and the Dent Blanche (right)

Aerial view of the west face of Ober Gabelhorn with the Arbengrat (from the summit to the right image border)

The Ober Gabelhorn lies in the Swiss canton of Valais at the southern end of the Zinal valley (part of the Val d'Anniviers). It rises, together with the Dent Blanche (west) and the Zinalrothorn (north), above the Zinal Glacier. On the south side lies the Zmutt Glacier in the valley of Zmutt, which extends west of Zermatt.

The Ober Gabelhorn has a pyramidal shape, similar to the nearby Matterhorn but on a smaller scale. Only the smooth north face is completely glaciated, the other faces being mostly rocky. The south-west ridge is called the Arbengrat while the north-north-west ridge is the Arête du Coeur. The south-east ridge looking over the Ober Gabeljoch (3,597 m) is the Gabelhorngrat. The Wellenkuppe is a lower prominence on the north-east ridge; it is usually climbed as part of the normal route.

Huts serving the peak are the Rothorn Hut (3,198 m), the Grand Mountet Hut (2,886 m) and the Arben Bivouac (3,224 m).

== Climbing history ==
The first ascent was by A. W. Moore, Horace Walker and Jakob Anderegg on 6 July 1865, via the east face.

The second ascent of the peak, and the first by the north-north-west ridge, was made one day later by Lord Francis Douglas, Peter Taugwalder and Joseph Vianin on 7 July 1865. At the time of their ascent they were not aware of Moore and party's success on the previous day.

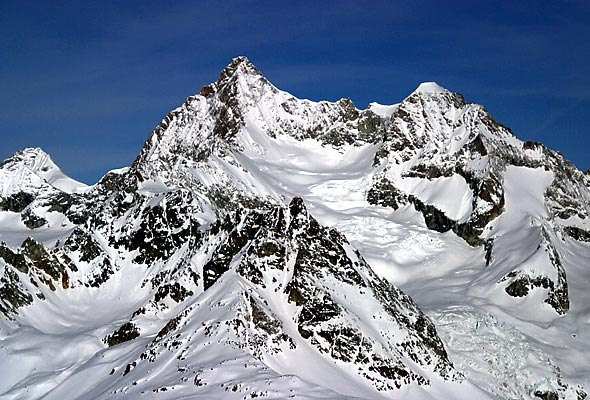
The east side of the mountain with the Wellenkuppe (right)

Douglas and Taugwalder made several attempts before they reached the summit. P. Inäbnit accompanied them on the first attempt from the south-east ridge. They didn't have enough time to go higher than the base of the mountain. On the second attempt they reached the Wellenkuppe (3,900 m) on the north-east ridge (the normal route today) but they considered that the ridge above was too difficult to continue. They finally reached the summit on their third attempt (Inäbnit having been replaced by Viennin). They were disconcerted to see some footprints on the east face (made by Moore, Walker and Anderegg on the previous day), but were relieved that no traces were visible on the summit. Not aware of the dangers that might have made the previous expedition turn back, they sat down on the summit to have lunch. Suddenly an avalanche started and everything on the summit began to fall away from them. Douglas and Taugwalder were swept away, but they were roped to Viennin who was a little distance below the summit. Viennin was able to belay Taugwalder and Douglas with the rope, which didn't break. Francis Douglas returned to Zermatt, and was killed a week later on 14 July on the first ascent of the Matterhorn.

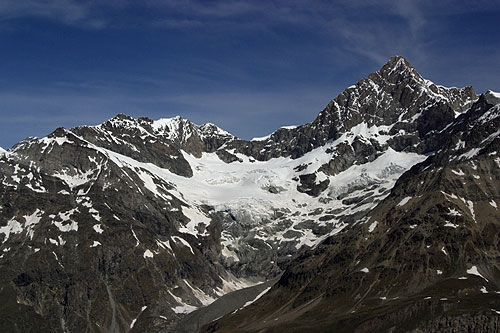
The south side

The Arbengrat was first climbed in 1874 by H. S. Hoare and E. Hulton with guides J. von Bergen, P. Rubi and J. Moser. The route on the Gabelhorngrat was opened three years later by J. Walker Hartley, W. E. Davidson, P. Rubi and J. Juan.

The north face, similar to but 'rather steeper' than the north-east face of the Lenzspitze, was first climbed on 30 July 1930 by H. Kiener and R. Schwarzgruber. They started from Zermatt at midnight and made a direct 2,000-metre ascent to the Triftjoch. They reached the base of the north face after having traversed the crevasses of the Ober Gabelhorn Glacier and successfully climbed it. This route was repeated only once until 1951.

Christian Klucker and Ludwig Norman-Neruda made the first ascent of the east-north-east ridge on 1 August 1890. Nowadays most of the climbers use this route, starting at the Rothorn Hut (above Zermatt) and passing over the summit of the Wellenkuppe. The major obstacle, the Klucker tower, is equipped with ropes since 1918.

== See also ==
- List of 4000 metre peaks of the Alps
