= Grandes Jorasses =

Mountain in the Mont Blanc massif

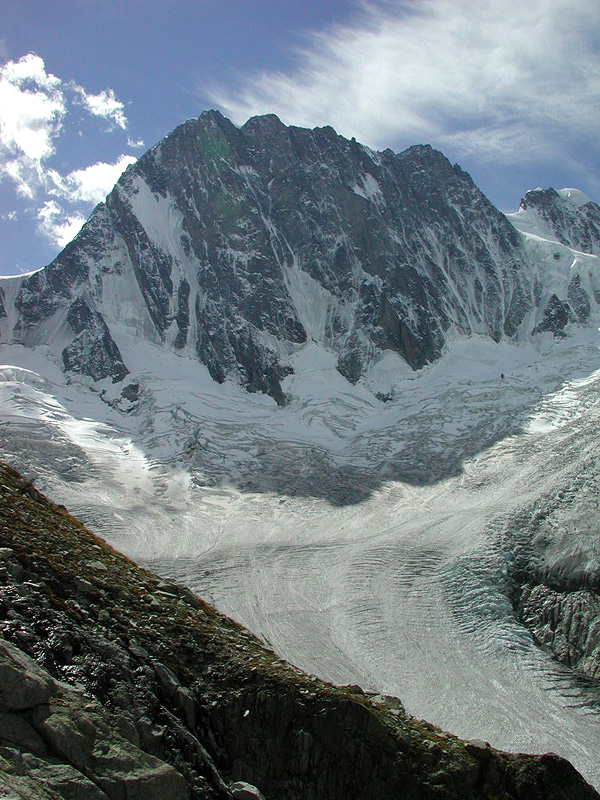
- North face of the Grandes Jorasses and the Leschaux Glacier (September 2000)

Highest point
- Elevation: 4,208 m (13,806 ft)
- Prominence: 852 m (2,795 ft)
- Listing: Alpine four-thousanders Great north faces of the Alps
- Coordinates: 45°52′08″N 6°59′17″E

Geography
- Location within Alps
- Location: Haute-Savoie, France / Aosta Valley, Italy
- Parent range: Graian Alps

Geology
- Mountain type: Granite

Climbing
- First ascent: Horace Walker, Melchior Anderegg, Johann Jaun and Julien Grange, 30 June 1868
- Easiest route: Pointe Walker, south-west face, AD-, II, 1,400 m (4,600 ft), to 45 degrees - a glacier climb

Aerial view of Pointe Walker from the southeast

The Grandes Jorasses (French pronunciation: [ɡʁɑ̃d ʒɔʁas]; 4,208 m; 13,806 ft) is a mountain in the Mont Blanc massif, on the boundary between Haute-Savoie in France and Aosta Valley in Italy.

The first ascent of the highest peak of the mountain (Pointe Walker) was by Horace Walker with guides Melchior Anderegg, Johann Jaun and Julien Grange on 30 June 1868. The second-highest peak on the mountain (Pointe Whymper, 4,184 m; 13,727 ft) was first climbed by Edward Whymper, Christian Almer, Michel Croz and Franz Biner on 24 June 1865, using what has become the normal route of ascent and the one followed by Walker's party in 1868.

== Geography ==
The summits on the mountain (from east to west) are:

- Pointe Walker (4,208 m; 13,806 ft) – the highest summit, named after Horace Walker, who made its first ascent
- Pointe Whymper (4,184 m; 13,727 ft) – the second-highest summit, named after Edward Whymper, who made its first ascent
- Pointe Croz (4,110 m; 13,484 ft) – named after Michel Croz, a guide from Chamonix
- Pointe Hélène (4,045 m; 13,271 ft) – named after Princess Elena
- Pointe Marguerite (4,065 m; 13,337) – named after Queen Margherita
- Pointe Young (3,996 m; 13,110 ft) – named after Geoffrey Winthrop Young

== North face ==
The north face is located on the French side of the mountain, and with the north faces of the Eiger and the Matterhorn is one of the three great north faces of the Alps. One of the most famous walls in the Alps, it towers 1,200 m (3,900 ft) above the Leschaux Glacier, stretching 18 km (11 mi) from end to end. The classic route on the face is the Walker Spur (Cassin/Esposito/Tizzoni, 1938, TD+/ED1, IV, 5c/6a, A1, 1,200 m (3,900 ft)), which leads directly to the summit of Pointe Walker. The other major buttress on the mountain is the Croz Spur, which leads to the summit of Pointe Croz. In her solo ascents of the six most difficult north faces of the Alps, Alison Hargreaves chose this route in preference to the Walker Spur.

Reinhold Messner has stated that he made the decision to ascend Mount Everest with Peter Habeler in the Grandes Jorasses, where Peter "descended like a dancer".

== South face ==
The south face can be accessed from the Boccalatte cabin on the Italian side of the mountain, above the hamlet of Planpincieux in the Italian Val Ferret, part of the Courmayeur municipality.

== Summit ridge ==
From the Col des Hirondelles, the summit ridge connects Pt. Walker to the other summit points and then descends to the Col des Grandes Jorasses where a bivouac shelter is located - the Bivouac E Canzio hut. The ridge forms the French-Italian border, almost all of which is above 4,000 m (13,000 ft).

== See also ==
- List of 4000 metre peaks of the Alps
- Planpincieux Glacier
