= Melchior Anderegg =

Swiss mountain guide

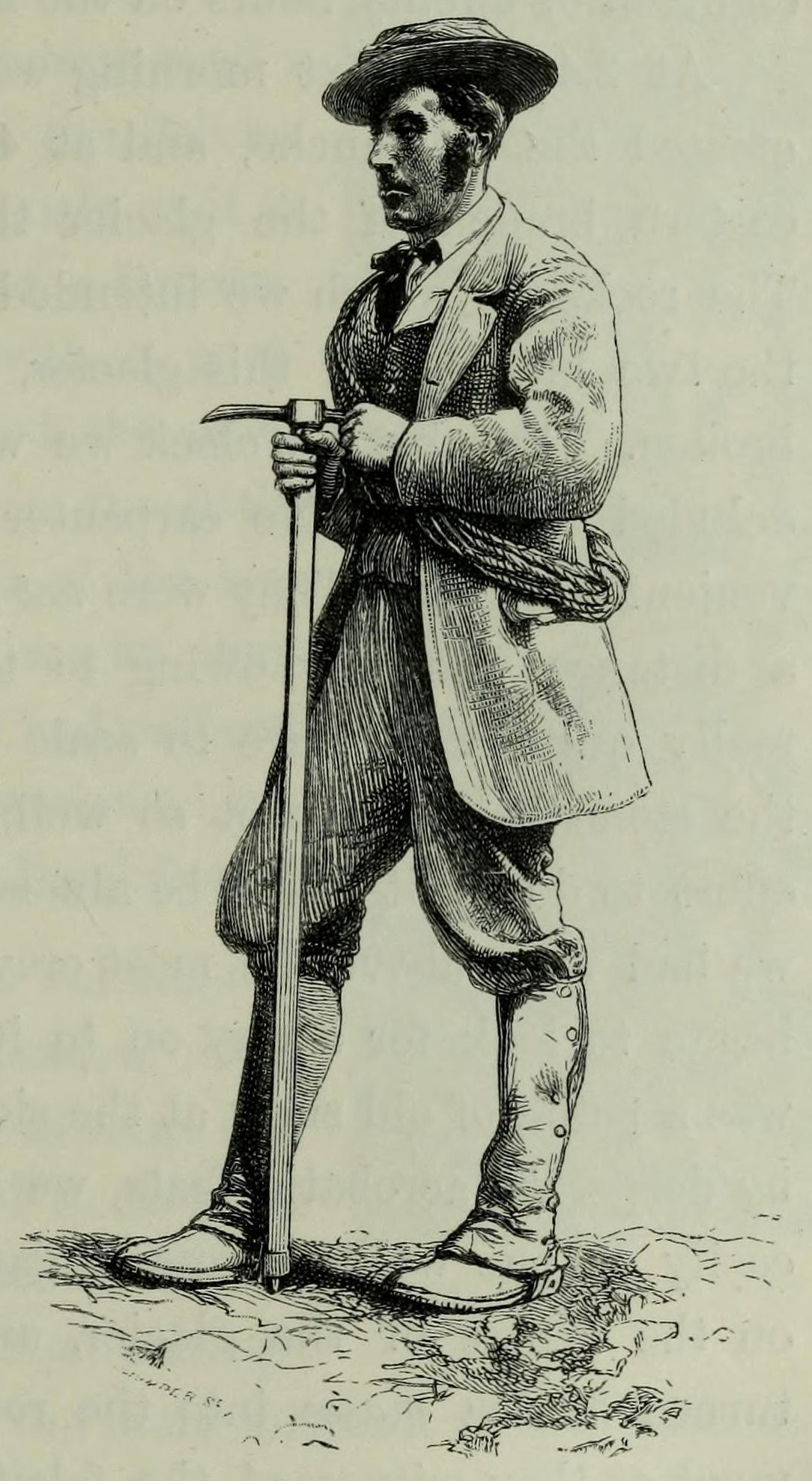
Whymper's engraving of Melchior Anderegg (1864)

Melchior Anderegg (28 March 1828 – 8 December 1914), from Zaun, Meiringen, was a Swiss mountain guide and the first ascensionist of many prominent mountains in the western Alps during the golden and silver ages of alpinism. His clients were mostly British, the most famous of whom was Leslie Stephen, the writer, critic and mountaineer; Anderegg also climbed extensively with members of the Walker family, including Horace Walker and Lucy Walker, and with Florence Crauford Grove. His cousin Jakob Anderegg was also a well-known guide.

== Alpine guide ==
First ascents by Melchior Anderegg

- Wildstrubel, 3,243 m (Bernese Alps), 11 September 1858
- Rimpfischhorn, 4,199 m (Pennine Alps), 9 September 1859
- Alphubel, 4,206 m (Pennine Alps), 9 August 1860
- Blüemlisalphorn, 3,664 m (Bernese Alps), 27 August 1860
- Monte Disgrazia, 3,678 m (Bregaglia Range), 23 August 1862
- Dent d'Hérens, 4,171 m (Pennine Alps), 12 August 1863
- Parrotspitze, 4,432 m (Pennine Alps), 16 August 1863
- Balmhorn, 3,698 m (Bernese Alps), 21 July 1864
- Zinalrothorn, 4,221 m (Pennine Alps), 22 August 1864
- Grandes Jorasses, 4,208 m (Mont Blanc Massif), 30 June 1868

Other noteworthy climbs by Melchior Anderegg

- Mont Blanc, 4,809 m, via the Bosses du Dromedaire (1859)
- Mont Blanc via the Dôme du Goûter (1861)
- Solo reconnaissance up the Zmuttgrat of the Matterhorn (Pennine Alps) (1863)
- Mont Blanc via the Brenva face (1865)
- Winter traverse of the Finsteraarhorn, 4,273 m (Bernese Alps) (1866)
- Civetta, 3,220 m (Dolomites) (1867)
- Winter ascent of the Plattenhörner (1869)
- First winter ascent of the Galenstock, 3,586 m (Urner Alps) (1877)

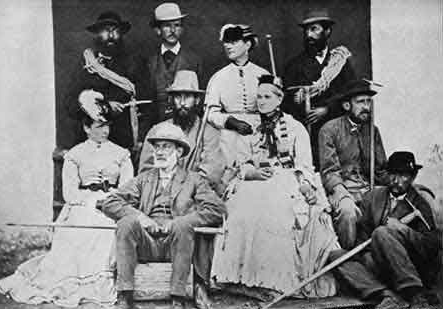
Melchior Anderegg (standing, 4th from left), Horace Walker (sitting, 3rd from left), Lucy Walker (standing, 3rd from left)

== Wood carver ==
Anderegg was also a professional wood carver and owned a shop in Zermatt that sold his carvings (of bears, groups of chamois, and eagles, amongst other subjects), as well as 'Photographs of all the great peaks around Zermatt', alpenstocks, snow spectacles ('blue, green, and neutral tint') and Whymper's guides.

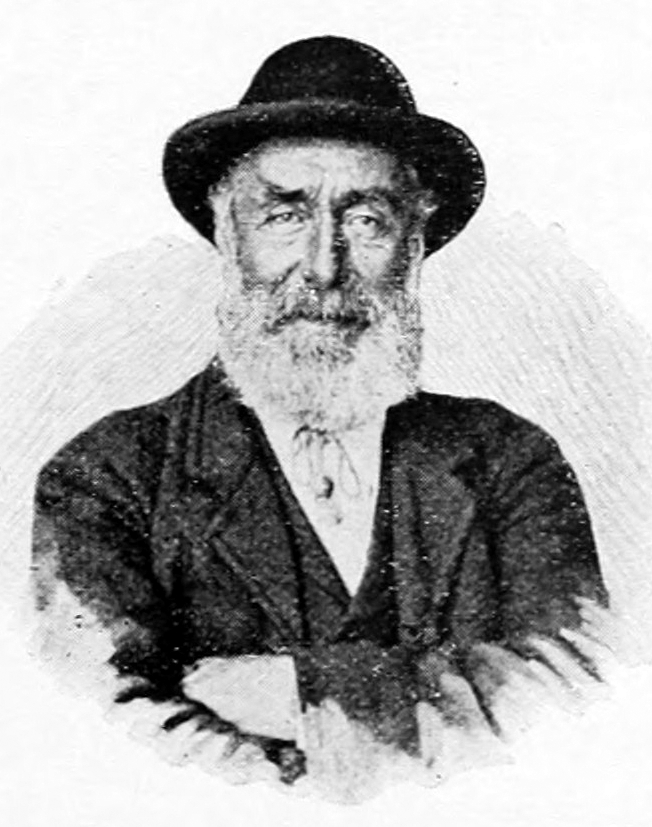
Portrait of Melchior Anderegg at sixty-eight (from a photograph by C. Myles Mathews)
