= Exploration of the High Alps =

Exploration and charting of the High Alps region

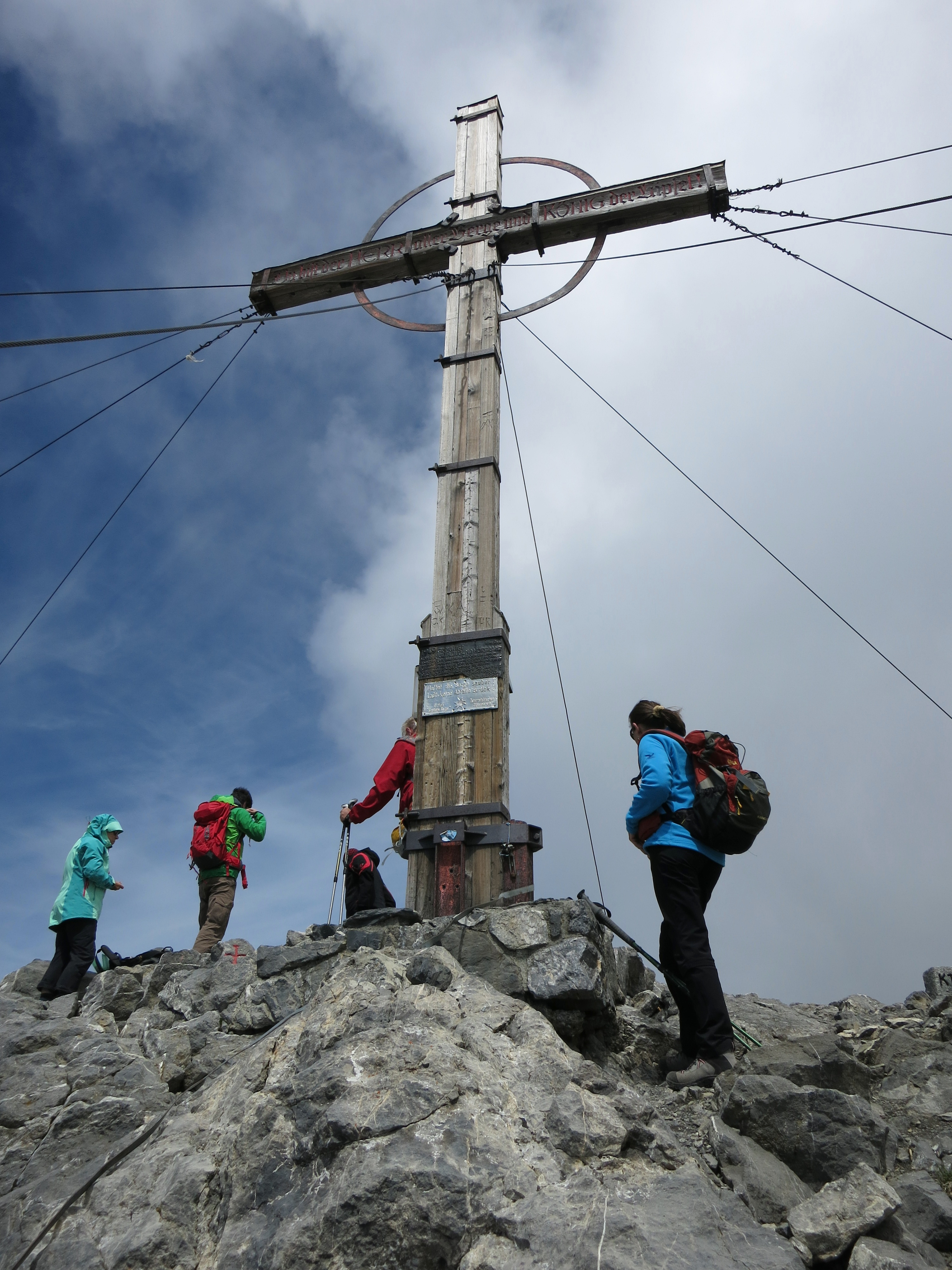
A hiking team at a summit cross of the Schesaplana, an early ascended, recorded Alpine mountains (1358; photo 2014)

Exploration of the higher region of the Alps by travellers from outside the immediate region only became popular from the 18th century. About 20 glacier passes were known before 1600, 25 more before 1700, and another 20 before 1800. While an attempt in 1689 to "re-open" the Col du Géant by Philibert-Amédée Arnod, an official from the duchy of Aosta, may be counted as having been made by a non-native, historical records do not show any further such activities until the last quarter of the 18th century. There are some records of very early ascents by non-natives, including that of the Rocciamelone in 1358 in fulfilment of a vow; that of the Mont Aiguille in 1492 by order of Charles VIII of France; and the ascent of the Gnepfstein, the lowest and the most westerly of the seven summits by Conrad Gessner in 1555.

== Late 18th and early 19th century ==
The first people who systematically explored the regions of ice and snow were Horace-Bénédict de Saussure (1740–1799), in the Pennine Alps, and the Benedictine monk of Disentis, Placidus a Spescha (1752–1833), in the valleys at the sources of the Rhine. In the early 19th century the Meyer family of Aarau climbed the Jungfrau (1811), and the Finsteraarhorn (1812), and opened several glacier passes. Their activity was entirely confined to the Bernese Oberland. Their pioneering work was extended by several Swiss adventurers, including Gottlieb Samuel Studer (1804–1890) of Bern and Edouard Desor (1811–1882) of Neuchâtel. The first-known English climber in the Alps was Colonel Mark Beaufoy (1764–1827), who made the fourth ascent of Mont Blanc in 1787.

In the Eastern Alps, serious exploration began with the first ascent of the Großglockner in 1800, initiated by Franz-Xaver Salm-Raifferscheid, Bishop of Gurk-Klagenfurt. Around Monte Rosa, the Vincent family, Josef Zumstein (1783–1861), and Giovanni Gnifetti (1801–1867) did good work during the half century between 1778 and 1842, while in the Eastern Alps archduke John (1782–1850), Friedrich Prince zu Schwarzenberg (1809–1885), Valentine Stanig (1774–1847), Adolf Schaubach (1800–1850) and P.J. Thurwieser (1789–1865) were pioneers in the first half of the 19th century.

== Late 19th century ==
In the early 1850s the taste for mountaineering developed, with stimulus provided by the foundation of various national Alpine clubs. The first was the English Alpine Club (founded in the winter of 1857–1858), followed in 1862 by the Austrian Alpine Club, the Italian and Swiss Alpine Club in 1863 and the German Alpine Club in 1869. In 1873, the German and Austrian clubs joined to form the German and Austrian Alpine Club. The French Alpine Club formed in 1874. Members of these clubs and societies carried out detailed exploration of the High Alps, built club huts, organized and trained guides, and published detailed information on routes and ascents in the club periodicals.

== First ascents of major peaks ==
The following two sub-joined lists give the dates of the first ascent of the greater peaks.

=== Before 1858 ===
- 1100 Untersberg
- 1358 Rocciamelone
- 1579 Serles
- 1610 Schesaplana
- 1739 or 1744 Titlis
- 1762 Ankogel
- 1778 Triglav
- 1779 Mont Velan
- 1782 Sulzfluh
- 1784 Dents du Midi
- 1786 Mont Blanc
- 1789 Rheinwaldhorn
- 1795 Großes Wiesbachhorn
- 1800 Großglockner
- 1801 Punta Giordani
- 1804 Ortler
- 1811 Jungfrau
- 1813 Breithorn
- 1819 Piramide Vincent
- 1820 Zugspitze, Zumsteinspitze
- 1824 Tödi
- 1828 Kitzsteinhorn, Mont Pelvoux
- 1829 (or 1812?) Finsteraarhorn
- 1830 Schalfkogel
- 1832 Hochvogel, Hoher Dachstein
- 1833 Strahlkogel
- 1835 Piz Linard, Piz Palü
- ~1840 Hoher Tenn, Schrankogel
- 1841 Großvenediger
- 1842 Lauteraarhorn, Punta Gnifetti
- 1843 Großer Löffler, Wildhorn
- 1844 Johannisberg, Wetterhorn
- 1845 Galenstock
- 1846 Piz Kesch
- 1848 Wildspitze, Zimba
- 1850 Diablerets, Piz Bernina
- 1853 Glockturm, Hohe Geige
- 1854 Hochgall, Königspitze, Rötspitze, Strahlhorn
- 1854 or 1855 Mont Blanc du Tacul
- 1855 Hochalmspitze, Dufourspitze (Monte Rosa), Weissmies
- 1856 Aiguille du Midi, Allalinhorn, Lagginhorn, Mönch, de:Reichenspitze
- 1857 Monte Pelmo, Piz Calderas, Uia di Ciamarella

=== 1858-present ===
- Dom, Eiger, Nadelhorn, Piz Morteratsch, Wildstrubel (1858)
- Aletschhorn, Bietschhorn, Grand Combin, Grivola, Rimpfischhorn (1859)
- Alphubel, Blüemlisalphorn, Gran Paradiso, Grande Casse (1860)
- Castor, Lyskamm, Monte Viso, Schreckhorn, Weisshorn, Weißkugel (1861)
- Dent Blanche, Gross Fiescherhorn, Monte Disgrazia, Täschhorn (1862)
- Dent d'Hérens, Parrotspitze, Piz Zupò (1863)
- Aiguille d'Argentière, Balmhorn, Barre des Écrins, Marmolata, Mont Dolent, Pollux, Presanella, Zinalrothorn (1864)
- Aiguille Verte, Grand Cornier, Matterhorn, Ober Gabelhorn, Piz Roseg, Tschingelhorn (1865)
- Piz Cengalo (1866)
- Piz Palü (1866/1868)
- Civetta, Piz Badile (1867)
- Bellavista, Grandes Jorasses (1868)
- Hohberghorn, Langkofel (1869)
- Ailefroide, Cimon della Pala, Lenzspitze (1870)
- Portjengrat, Aiguille du Plan (1871)
- Pierre Menue, Levanna Centrale (1875)
- Les Droites, Mont Collon (1876)
- Meije, Mont Blanc de Courmayeur, Piz Scerscen, Pic Coolidge (1877)
- Aiguille du Dru, Les Bans, Mont Maudit (1878)
- Dürrenhorn (1879)
- Aiguille des Grands Charmoz, Olan (1880)
- Aiguille du Grépon (1881)
- Dent du Géant (1882)
- Bishorn (1884)
- Aiguille Blanche de Peuterey (1885)
- Stecknadelhorn (1887)
- Fletschhorn (1889)
- Aiguille Dibona (1913)

== See also ==
- Golden age of alpinism
- History of the Alps
- Silver age of alpinism
- A detailed list of first ascents, including over a hundred mountains in the Alps
- List of mountains of the Alps, all 1500+ peaks with >300 m prominence, most with first ascent years
