= Pic Luigi Amedeo =

Mountain in the Mont Blanc massif in the Val d'Aosta, Italy

- Italian: Picco Luigi Amedeo; French: Pointe Louis-Amédée
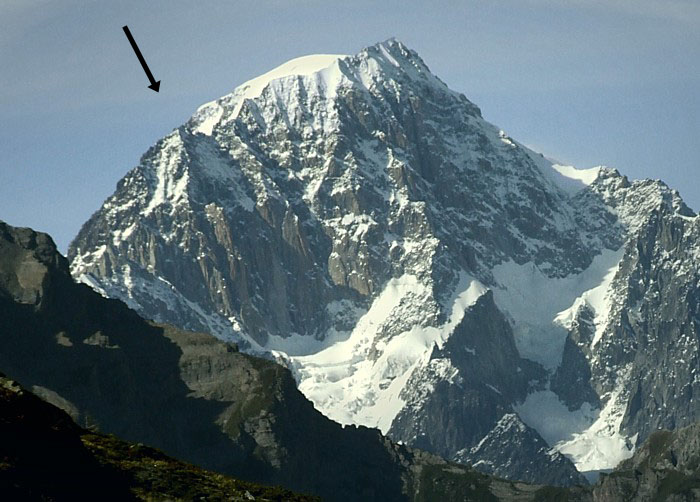
- Pic Luigi Amedeo (left of the snowy summit of Mont Blanc and the rocky peak of Mont Blanc de Courmayeur)

Highest point
- Elevation: 4,469 m (14,662 ft)
- Prominence: 39 m ↓
- Isolation: 0.73 km → Mont Blanc de Courmayeur
- Coordinates: 45°49′19″N 06°51′55″E

Geography
- Location within Italy
- Location: Aosta Valley, Italy
- Parent range: Mont Blanc massif

Climbing
- First ascent: 20 July 1901 by G.B. and G.F. Gugliermina with the guide Joseph Brocherel

Pic Luigi Amedeo (Italian: Picco Luigi Amedeo, French: Pointe Louis-Amédée) (4,469 metres (14,662 ft)) is a mountain in the Mont Blanc massif in the Aosta Valley, Italy. It lies on the Brouillard ridge to the summit of Mont Blanc, and is only reachable via an ascent of that ridge.

The mountain is named after Prince Luigi Amedeo, Duke of the Abruzzi, after whom the Abruzzi Spur on K2 is also named.

The first ascent of the peak was by G.B. and G.F. Gugliermina with the Aostan guide Joseph Brocherel on 20 July 1901. The first ascent of the entire Brouillard ridge including Pic Luigi Amedeo was by Karl Blodig, Humphrey Owen Jones, Geoffrey Winthrop Young with the guide Josef Knubel of St. Niklaus in the canton Valais on 9 August 1911.

== See also ==
- List of 4000 metre peaks of the Alps
