= List of mountains of the Alps over 4000 metres =

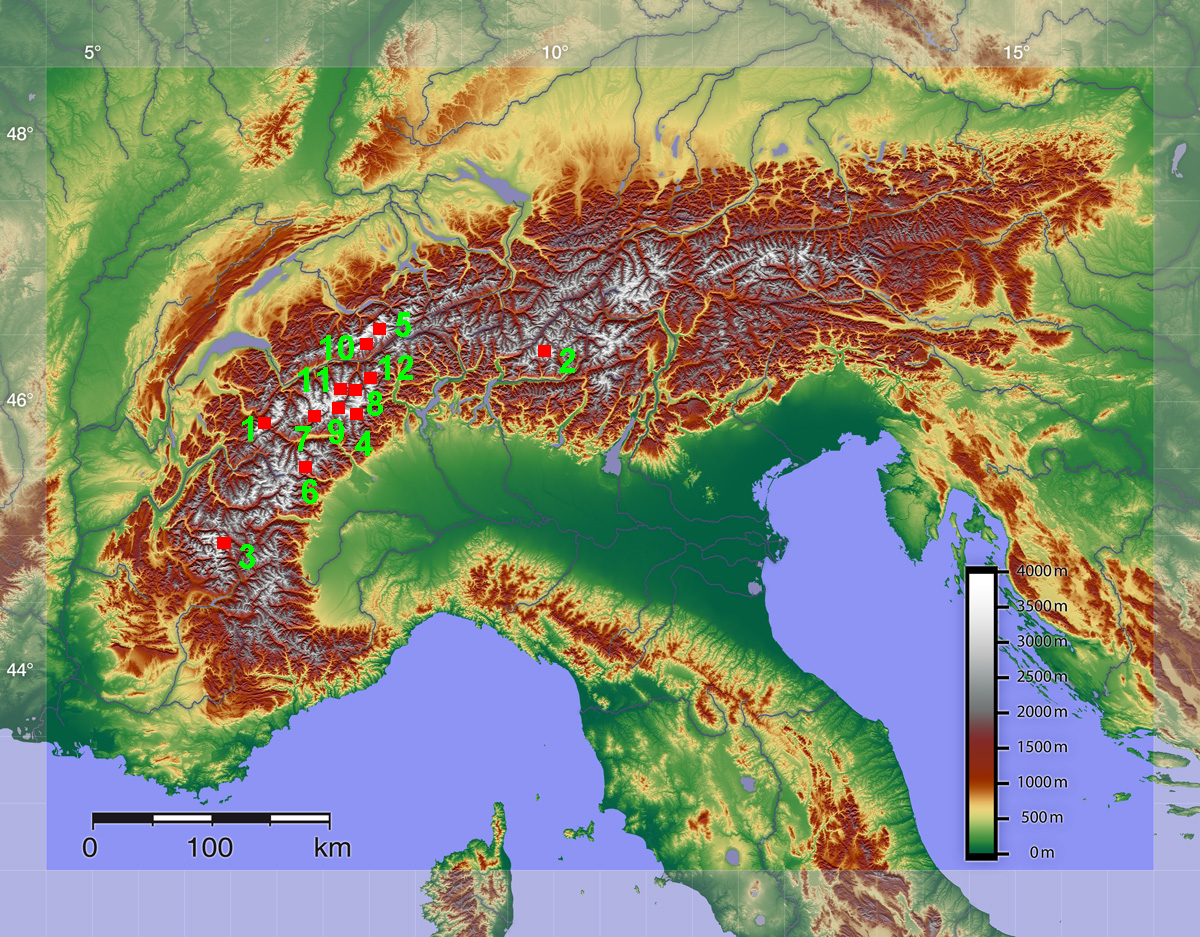
1 Mont Blanc, 2 Piz Bernina, 3 Barre des Écrins, 4 Dufourspitze, 5 Finsteraarhorn, 6 Gran Paradiso, 7 Grand Combin, 8 Dom, 9 Matterhorn, 10 Aletschhorn, 11 Weisshorn, 12 Weissmies

This list tabulates all of the 82 official mountain summits of 4,000 metres (13,123 ft) or more in height in the Alps, as defined by the International Climbing and Mountaineering Federation (UIAA). They are the highest mountains of the Alps, all located in Switzerland (48), (Note: Cantons of Valais (45), Bern (7) and Graubünden (1)) Italy (38), and France (25), and are often referred to by mountaineers as the Alpine four-thousanders. A further table of 46 subsidiary mountain points which did not meet the UIAA's selection criteria is also included.

The official UIAA list of 82 mountain summits, titled in English as 'The 4000ers of the Alps' was first published in 1994. They were selected primarily on a prominence of at least 30 metres (98 ft)) above the highest adjacent col or pass. Additional criteria were used to include or exclude some points, based on the mountain's overall morphology and mountaineering significance. (For example, the Grand Gendarme on the Weisshorn was excluded, despite meeting the prominence criterion as it was simply deemed part of that mountain's ridge.) A further 46 additional points of mountaineering significance, such as Pic Eccles, which did not meet the UIAA's primary selection criteria, were then included within an 'enlarged list'. Another, less formal, list of 4000 metre alpine mountains, containing only independent peaks with a prominence of over 100m, and based on an earlier 1990s publications by Richard Goedeke, contains just 51 mountains.

For a list containing many of the independent mountains of the Alps and covering all countries, see List of prominent mountains of the Alps.

== Official list ==
The table shows the 82 four-thousanders in the Alps that are recognised by the UIAA.

Clicking the symbol at the head of the column sorts the table by that column’s data.

Nr.	Image	Summit	Height (m)	Range	Country	Isolation (km)	Prominence (m)	First ascent	Easiest (normal) route to summit	Observations
1	Mont Blanc seen from Gare des Glaciers	Mont Blanc (Note: Mont Blanc's summit is an ice cap which varies in height from year to year. It is now accurately remeasured every two years. In 2017 it was measured at 4808.72 metres.)	4,809	Mont Blanc Group	France/ Italy	2,812; Elbrus (RU)	4,697 near Lake Kubenskoye (RU) (Note: This relates to Mount Elbrus in the Caucasus, the nearest higher mountain, which can be reached by descending to this height (108 metres above the sea).)	8 August 1786; Jacques Balmat, Michel-Gabriel Paccard	Goûter Route (PD-/PD+)	Highest mountain of the Alps, border dispute France/Italy
2	Mont Blanc de Courmayeur seen Mont Blanc	Mont Blanc de Courmayeur	4,748	Mont Blanc Group	France/ Italy	0.6; Mont Blanc	18; Col Major	18 August 1822; F. Clissold, J. M. Couttet and five guides	Goûter Route (PD-/PD+) extension from summit of Mont Blanc	Fore-summit of Mont Blanc, border dispute France/Italy
3	Dufourspitze seen from the west	Dufourspitze	4,634	Monte Rosa Massif	Italy/Switzerland	78.3; Mont Blanc de Courmayeur	2,165; Grosser Sankt Bernhard	1 August 1855; Charles Hudson and 7 companions	From Monte Rosa Hut via Monte Rosa glacier (III, 40°, AD-)	Highest peak of the Monte Rosa Massif, highest peak of the Alps outside of the Mont Blanc Massif
4	Nordend from Zumsteinspitze	Nordend	4,608	Monte Rosa Massif	Italy/ Switzerland	0.6; Grenzgipfel	89; Silbersattel	26 August 1861; Edward N. Buxton, T.F. Buxton, John J. Cowell, Michel-Clément Payot, Binder	From Monte Rosa Hut via Silbersattel (II, PD)	
5	Zumsteinspitze summit	Zumsteinspitze	4,563	Monte Rosa Massif	Italy/ Switzerland	0.5; Grenzgipfel	112; Grenzsattel	1 August 1820; Joseph Zumstein, Joseph Vincent and Johann Niklaus Vincent and others	From Gnifetti Hut (Italian side) via Lys glacier or Monte Rosa Hut (Swiss side) via Grenz glacier to Lys Col and then along the Western flank and SE ridge to the summit (I, PD)	
6	Signalkuppe seen from the south	Signalkuppe	4,554	Monte Rosa Massif	Italy/ Switzerland	0.7; Zumsteinspitze	98; Colle Gnifetti	9 August 1842; Giovanni Gnifetti and 7 companions		Highest mountain hut and building in Europe, Capanna Regina Margherita, at 4,554 m.
7	Dom seen from the north	Dom	4,546	Mischabel Group	Switzerland	16.9; Nordend	1,057; Neues Weisstor	11 September 1858; John Llewelyn Davies, Johann Zumtaugwald, Johann Kronig, Hieronymous Brantschen	From Domhütte via Northern flank to the summit (PD)	Highest peak located entirely within Switzerland
8	Lyskamm Eastern Summit seen from the west	Lyskamm (Eastern Summit)	4,532	Wallis Alps	Italy/ Switzerland	2.9; Zumsteinspitze	379; Lisjoch	19 August 1861 by 14 mountaineers	From Gnifetti Hut via Lys glacier, Lys Col (Lisjoch) and East Ridge to the (Eastern) summit (II, AD)	Western summit (4479 m)
9	Weisshorn seen from the east	Weisshorn	4,505	Wallis Alps	Switzerland	11.1; Dom	1,234; Furggjoch	19 August 1861; John Tyndall, Johann Joseph Brennen, Ulrich Wenger	East ridge from Weisshornhütte (III, AD)	
10	Täschorn west face	Täschhorn	4,491	Mischabel Group	Switzerland	1.2; Dom	213; Domjoch	30 July 1862; John Llewelyn Davies, J.W. Hayward, Peter-Josef Summermatter, Stefan, Johann Zumtaugwald	South East ridge from Mischabeljochbiwak (III, AD)	
11	Lyskamm Western Summit from Felikjoch	Lyskamm (Western Summit)	4,479	Wallis Alps	Italy/ Switzerland	1.1; Lyskamm Eastern Summit	61; Col to the Eastern Summit	19 August 1861; William E. Hall and 13 companions	West flank from Quintino Sella Hut (PD+)	
12	Matterhorn from the north	Matterhorn	4,478	Wallis Alps	Italy/ Switzerland	13.9; Lyskamm Western Summit	1,043; Col Durand	14 July 1865; Croz, Taugwalder, Whymper, Hudson, Douglas and Hadow	Hörnli ridge from Hörnli hut (III, AD)	
13	Picco Luigi Amedeo von La Thuile	Picco Luigi Amedeo	4,469	Mont Blanc Group	Italy	0.7; Mont Blanc de Courmayeur	39; Col to Mont Blanc de Courmayeur	20 July 1901; G.B. and G.F. Gugliermina, Joseph Brocherel		
14	Mont Maudit seen from the northeast	Mont Maudit	4,465	Mont Blanc Group	France/ Italy	1.9; Mont Blanc	162; Col de la Brenva	12 September 1878; Henry S. King, William E. Davidson, Johann Jaun, Johann von Bergen		
15	Parrotspitze from the Lyskamm	Parrotspitze	4,434	Monte Rosa Massif	Italy/ Switzerland	0.9; Signalkuppe	134; Seserjoch	16 August 1863; Florence Crauford Grove, Melchior Anderegg and 4 companions		
16	Dent Blanche	Dent Blanche	4,357	Wallis Alps	Switzerland	7.4; Matterhorn	916; Wandfluejoch	18 July 1862; Thomas S. Kennedy, William and C. Wigram mit Jean-Baptiste Croz, Johann Kronig		
17	Ludwigshöhe seen from the north	Ludwigshöhe	4,341	Monte Rosa Massif	Italy/ Switzerland	0.7; Parrotspitze	57; Fiodejoch	25 August 1822; Ludwig von Welden and companions		
18	Nadelhorn seen from the Ulrichshorn	Nadelhorn	4,327	Mischabel Group	Switzerland	1.7; Dom	207; Lenzjoch	16 September 1858; Franz Andenmatten, Baptiste Epiney, Aloys Supersaxo, Joseph Zimmermann		
19	Schwarzhorn seen from the Ludwigshöhe	Schwarzhorn (Corno Nero)	4,321	Monte Rosa Massif	Italy	0.3; Ludwigshöhe	42 col with the Ludwigshöhe	18 August 1873; Marco Maglionini, Albert de Rothschild, Eduard Cupelin mit Peter and Nikolaus Knubel		
20	Grand Combin from the north	Combin de Grafeneire	4,309	Grand Combin	Switzerland	26.5; Dent Blanche	1,512; Fenêtre de Durand	20 July 1857; Jouvence Bruchez, Benjamin, Maurice Felley		
21	Dôme du Goûter seen from Chamonix	Dôme du Goûter	4,304	Mont Blanc Group	France; Italy	2.0; Mont Blanc	68; Col du Dôme	17 September 1784; Jean-Marie Couttet, François Cuidet		
22	Lenzspitze northeast face	Lenzspitze	4,293	Mischabel Group	Switzerland	0.5; Nadelhorn	86; Nadeljoch	1870; Clinton Thomas Dent, Alexander and Franz Burgener		
23	Finsteraarhorn from the east	Finsteraarhorn	4,274	Bernese Alps	Switzerland	51.7; Nadelhorn	2,279 west of the Simplon Pass	16 August 1812; Arnold Abbühl, Joseph Bortis, Alois Volker		
24	Mont Blanc du Tacul seen from the Aiguille du Midi	Mont Blanc du Tacul	4,248	Mont Blanc Group	France	1.4; Mont Maudit	219; Col Maudit	31 July 1855; J-M Chabot, P-J Mochet, J-M Perrod and James H. Ramsay		
25	Grand Pilier d’Angle north face	Grand Pilier d’Angle	4,243	Mont Blanc Group	Italy	0.7; Mont Blanc de Courmayeur	35; Col to the Mont Blanc de Courmayeur	3 August 1957; Walter Bonatti, Toni Gobbi		
26	Nadelhorn seen from the Ulrichshorn	Stecknadelhorn	4,240	Mischabel Group	Switzerland	0.5; Nadelhorn	27; Stecknadeljoch	8 August 1887; Oscar Eckenstein, Matthias Zurbriggen		
27	Castor (links) seen from the Grenz Glacier	Castor	4,225	Wallis Alps	Italy/ Switzerland	2.4; Lyskamm Western Summit	156; Felikjoch	23 August 1861; William Mathews, F.W. Jacomb, Michel Croz		
28	Zinalrothorn from the east	Zinalrothorn	4,221	Wallis Alps	Switzerland	4.5; Weisshorn	491; Hohlicht Pass	22 August 1864; Florence Crauford Grove, Leslie Stephen, Jakob and Melchior Anderegg		
29	Nadelhorn seen from the Ulrichshorn	Hohberghorn	4,218	Mischabel Group	Switzerland	0.4; Stecknadelhorn	76; Hohbergjoch	August 1869; R. B. Heathcote, Franz Biner, Peter Perren, Peter Taugwalder		
30	Vincent Pyramid seen from Parrotspitze	Vincent Pyramid	4,215	Monte Rosa Massif	Italy	0.7; Schwarzhorn (Corno Nero)	128; Col to the Schwarzhorn	5 August 1819; Johann Nikolaus Vincent, three unknown companions		
31	Grandes Jorasses from the north	Grandes Jorasses (Pointe Walker)	4,208	Mont Blanc Group	France/ Italy	7.9; Mont Blanc du Tacul	852; Col du Géant	30 June 1868; Horace Walker, Melchior Anderegg, J. Jaun, J. Grange		
32	Alphubel from the south	Alphubel	4,206	Mischabel Group	Switzerland	2.3; Täschhorn	359; Mischabeljoch	9 August 1860; T .W. Hinchliff, Leslie Stephen, Melchior Anderegg, Peter Perren		
33	Rimpfischhorn seen from Gornergrat	Rimpfischhorn	4,199	Mischabel Group	Switzerland	4.7; Alphubel	647; Allalin Pass	9 September 1859; Leslie Stephen, Robert Liveing, Melchior Anderegg, Johann Zumtaugwald		
34	Aletschhorn from Mönchsjoch	Aletschhorn	4,194	Bernese Alps	Switzerland	13.5; Finsteraarhorn	1,043; Lötschenlücke	18 June 1859; Francis F. Tuckett, Johann Joseph Bennen, Peter Bohren, V. Tairraz		
35	Strahlhorn (right)	Strahlhorn	4,190	Mischabel Group	Switzerland	1.8; Rimpfischhorn	404; Alder Pass	15 August 1854; Edmund J. Grenville, Christopher Smyth, Franz-Josef Andenmatten, Ulrich Lauener		
36	Grand Combin from the north	Combin de Valsorey	4,184	Grand Combin	Switzerland	0.5; Combin de Grafeneire	57; Col to the Combin de Grafeneire			
37		Grandes Jorasses (Pointe Whymper)	4,184	Mont Blanc Group	France/ Italy	0.2; Pointe Walker	51 col with the Pointe Walker	24. June 1865; Edward Whymper, Michel Croz, Christian Almer, F. Biner		
38	Dent d’Hérens from the north	Dent d’Hérens	4,173	Wallis Alps	Italy/ Switzerland	4.2; Matterhorn	704; Colle Tournanche	12 August 1863; Florence Crauford Grove, Melchior Anderegg and 5 companions		
39	Breithorn from Klein Matterhorn	Breithorn (Western Summit)	4,160	Wallis Alps	Italy/ Switzerland	4.2; Castor	438; Schwarztor	13 August 1813; Henri Maynard, Joseph-Marie Couttet, Jean Gras, Jean-Baptiste and Jean-Jacques Erin		
40	Jungfrau (4,158) seen from Interlaken	Jungfrau	4,158	Bernese Alps	Switzerland	8.3; Aletschhorn	694; Jungfraujoch	3 August 1811; Johann Rudolf, Hieronymus Meyer, Alois Volker, Joseph Bortis		
41	Breithorn Central Summit	Breithorn (Central Summit)	4,154	Wallis Alps	Italy/ Switzerland	0.7; Breithorn (Western Summit)	73; Col to the (Western Summit)	13 August 1813; Henri Maynard, Joseph-Marie Couttet, Jean Gras, Jean-Baptiste and Jean-Jacques Erin		
42	Bishorn (4,153) Nordwand	Bishorn	4,151	Wallis Alps	Switzerland	0.8; Weisshorn	90; Weisshornjoch	18 August 1884; G. S. Barnes, R. Chessyre-Walker, Joseph Imboden, J. M. Chanton		
43	Breithorn Twin Peaks (4,139, left)	Eastern Breithorn (Eastern Summit/ western Twin Peak)	4,138	Wallis Alps	Italy/ Switzerland	0.8; Breithorn (Central Summit)	120; Selle			
44	Grand Combin from the north	Combin de la Tsessette	4,132	Grand Combin	Switzerland	0.9; Combin de Grafeneire	57; Col to the Combin de Grafeneire	21 July 1894; E.F.M.Benecke and H.A.Cohen		
45	Aiguille Verte from the north	Aiguille Verte	4,122	Mont Blanc Group	France	7.2; Grandes Jorasses	689; Col de l’Eboulement	29 June 1865; Edward Whymper, Christian Almer, Franz Biner		
46	The Aiguilles de Diable from the north	Aiguilles du Diable (L’Isolée)	4,114	Mont Blanc Group	France	0.2; Mont Blanc du Tacul	36; Col to Mont Blanc du Tacul	1925; Antoine Blanchet, Armand Charlet		
47	North face of Aiguille Blanche de Peuterey	Aiguille Blanche de Peuterey	4,112	Mont Blanc Group	Italy	1.0; Mont Blanc	178; Col de Peuterey	31 July 1885; Henry S. King, Emile Rey, Ambros Supersaxo, Aloys Anthamatten		
48	Mönch seen from the north	Mönch	4,110	Bernese Alps	Switzerland	3.5; Jungfrau	591; Unteres Mönchsjoch	15 August 1857; Sigismund Porges, Christian Almer, Christian and Ulrich Kaufmann		
49		Grandes Jorasses (Pointe Croz)	4,110	Mont Blanc Group	France/ Italy	0.4; Pointe Whymper	10 col with Pointe Walker			
50	The Aiguilles de Diable from the north	Aiguilles du Diable (Pointe Carmen)	4,109	Mont Blanc Group	France	0.2; L'Isolée	36 col with L'Isolée	1923; Brégault, Chevalier, De Lépiney		
51		Breithorn (Gendarm/ eastern Twin Peak)	4,106	Wallis Alps	Italy/ Switzerland	0.3; Breithorn (eastern Twin Peak)	36; Col to western Twin Peak			
52		Grande Rocheuse	4,102	Mont Blanc Group	France	0.3; Aiguille Verte	52 col with the Aiguille Verte	17 September 1865; Robert Fowler, Michel Ducroz, Michel Balmat		
53	Barre des Écrins south face	Barre des Écrins	4,102	Pelvoux	France	107.3; Picco Luigi Amedeo	2,045; Col du Lautaret	25 June 1864; Edward Whymper, Horace Walker, Adolphus W. Moore, Christian Almer, Michel Croz		
54	The Aiguilles de Diable from the north	Aiguilles du Diable (Pointe Médiane)	4,097	Mont Blanc Group	France	0.2; Pointe Carmen	40 col with the Carmen	1925; Antoine Blanchet, Jean Chaubert, Armand Charlet, Devouassoud		
55	Pollux seen from the Gornergrat	Pollux	4,089	Wallis Alps	Italy/ Switzerland	0.7; Castor	243; Zwillingsjoch	1 August 1864; Jules Jacot, Josef-Marie Perren, Peter Taugwalder sen.		
56	Schreckhorn seen from the north	Schreckhorn	4,078	Bernese Alps	Switzerland	5.9; Finsteraarhorn	795; Finsteraarjoch	1 August 1864; Leslie Stephen, Ulrich Kaufmann, Peter and Christian Michel		
57	Roccia Nera	Breithorn (Roccia Nera)	4,075	Wallis Alps	Italy/ Switzerland	0.4; Zwilling-Ost	30; Col to the Zwilling East			
58	The Aiguilles de Diable from the north	Aiguilles du Diable (Pointe Chaubert)	4,074	Mont Blanc Group	France	0.2; Pointe Médiane	57; Col to the Médiane	1925; Jean Chaubert, Armand Charlet		
59	Mont Brouillard seen from Col Emile Rey	Mont Brouillard	4,069	Mont Blanc Group	France	0.2; Picco Luigi Amedeo	39; Col Emile Rey	1906; Karl Blodig, Oscar Eckenstein, Alessio Brocherel		
60		Grandes Jorasses (Pointe Marguerite)	4,065	Mont Blanc Group	France/ Italy	0.2; Pointe Croz	50 col with Pointe Croz			
61	The Aiguilles de Diable from the north	Aiguilles du Diable (Corne du Diable)	4,064	Mont Blanc Group	France	0.2; Pointe Chaubert	19; Col to the Chaubert	1925; Jean Chaubert, Armand Charlet		
62	Ober Gabelhorn	Ober Gabelhorn	4,063	Wallis Alps	Switzerland	3.1; Zinalrothorn	536; Triftjoch	6 July 1865; Horace Walker, Adolphus W. Moore, Jakob Anderegg		
63	Gran Paradiso by sunset	Gran Paradiso	4,061	Graian Alps	Italy	45.1; Grandes Jorasses	1,888; Nahe Kleiner Sankt Bernhard	4. September 1860; John J. Cowell, W. Dundas, Jean Tairraz, Michel-Clément Payot		
64	Aiguille de Bionnassay from Dôme du Goûter	Aiguille de Bionnassay	4,052	Mont Blanc Group	France/ Italy	1.8; Dôme du Goûter	164; Col de Bionnassay	28 July 1865; E.N. Buxton, F.C. Grove, R.J.S. Macdonald, Michel Payot, Jean-Pierre Cachat		
65	Gross Fiescherhorn vom Mittellegigrat aus seen	Gross Fiescherhorn	4,049	Bernese Alps	Switzerland	4.7; Mönch	396; Fiescherjoch	23 July 1862; Adolphus W. Moore, H. B. George, Ulrich Kaufmann, Christian Almer		
66	Piz Bernina	Piz Bernina	4,048	Bernina Group	Switzerland	138; Finsteraarhorn	2,236; Maloja Pass	13 September 1850; Johann Coaz, Jon and Lorenz Ragut Tscharner	Spallagrat from Marco e Rosa hut (PD+, III)	
67		Vincent Pyramid (Punta Giordani/Giordanispetz)	4,046	Monte Rosa Massif	Italy	0.1; Vincent Pyramid	6 col with the Vincent Pyramid	23 July 1801; Pietro Giordani		
68		Grandes Jorasses (Pointe Elena)	4,045	Mont Blanc Group	France/ Italy	0.2; Pointe Marguerite	10 col with Pointe Marguerite			
69	Grünhorn	Grünhorn	4,043	Bernese Alps	Switzerland	2.5; Gross Fiescherhorn	303; Kleine Grünhornlücke	7 August 1865; Edmund von Fellenberg, Peter Michel, Peter Egger, Peter Inäbnit		
70	Lauteraarhorn	Lauteraarhorn	4,042	Bernese Alps	Switzerland	1.0; Gross Fiescherhorn	128; Schreckhorn Saddle	7 August 1865; Pierre Desor, Arnold Escher von der Linth, Christian Girard, Melchior Bannholzer, Jakob Leuthold		
71		Aiguille du Jardin	4,035	Mont Blanc Group	France	0.2; Grande Rocheuse	37 col with the Rocheuse	1 August 1904; E. Fontaine, Jean Ravanel, Léon Tournier		
72	Dürrenhorn	Dürrenhorn	4,035	Mischabel Group	Switzerland	0.8; Hohberghorn	124; Dürrenjoch	7 September 1879; Albert F. Mummery, William Penhall, Alexander Burgener, Ferdinand Imseng		
73	Allalinhorn	Allalinhorn	4,027	Mischabel Group	Switzerland	2.1; Rimpfischhorn	257; Alphubeljoch	28 August 1856; Edward L. Ames, Johann Josef Imseng, Franz Josef Andenmatten		
74		Hinter Fiescherhorn	4,025	Bernese Alps	Switzerland	0.7; Gross Fiescherhorn	102; Fiescher Saddle	28 July 1885; Eugen Guido Lammer, August Lorria		
75		Dôme de Rochefort	4,015	Mont Blanc Group	France/ Italy	0.9; Pointe Marguerite	206; Col des Grandes Jorasses	12 August 1881; Alphonse Payot, Michel-Clément Payot, J. Eccles		
76	Dôme de Neige	Barre des Écrins (Dôme de Neige)	4,015	Pelvoux	France	0.2; Barre des Écrins	41; Brèche Lory			
77	Weissmies from Lagginhorn	Weissmies	4,013	Wallis Alps	Switzerland	11.2; Lenzspitze	1,183; Mondelli Pass	Late August 1855 de:Jakob Christian Heusser, Peter Josef Zurbriggen	Normal route via NW flank from Hohsaas (PD-)	
78	Dent du Géant	Dent du Géant	4,013	Mont Blanc Group	France/ Italy	1.2; Dôme de Rochefort	139 col with the Aiguille de Rochefort	28 July 1882; Jean-Joseph, Baptiste and Daniel Maquignaz ("Pointe Sella") (Note: The 4 meter higher Pointe Graham was reached a month later, 20 August 1882, by William Woodman Graham guided by Auguste Cupelin and Alphonse Payot, using the fixed ropes of the first party)		
79		Punta Baretti	4,013	Mont Blanc Group	Italy	0.3; Mont Brouillard	56; Col to the Mont Brouillard	28 July 1880; Martino Baretti, Jean-Joseph Maquignaz		
80	Lagginhorn west face	Lagginhorn	4,010	Wallis Alps	Switzerland	3.3; Weissmies	512; Lagginjoch	26 July 1856; Edward L. Ames, Johann Josef Imseng, Franz-Josef Andenmatten	Normal route via W ridge from Hohsaas (PD-)	
81	Aiguille de Rochefort	Aiguille de Rochefort	4,001	Mont Blanc Group	France/ Italy	0.6; Dent du Géant	106; Col to the Dôme de Rochefort	14. August 1873; Alphonse Payot, Michel-Clément Payot, J. Eccles		
82	Les Droites	Les Droites	4,000	Mont Blanc Group	France	0.7; Grande Rocheuse	204; Col de l’ Aiguille Verte	7 August 1876; Thomas Middlemore, John Oakley Maund, Henri Cordier, Johann Jaun, Andreas Maurer		

== Enlarged list ==
The following expandable table forms an extended list of 46 ‘lesser summits’ identified by the UIAA. These are either:

- secondary summits or gendarmes which satisfy the topographic criteria, but are part of other well-defined mountain summits already listed above,
- or have failed to meet the topographic criteria, but have been included through more subjective criteria (i.e. morphological or mountaineering significance).

Name	Country	Height	Range
Rocher de la Tournette	France, Italy	4677 m	Mont Blanc Massif
Dunantspitze	Switzerland	4632 m	Monte Rosa Massif
Grenzgipfel	Italy, Switzerland	4618 m	Monte Rosa Massif
Les Bosses	France, Italy	4547 m	Mont Blanc Massif
La Grande Bosse	France, Italy	4513 m	Mont Blanc Massif
Monte Cervino Vetta Italiana/Sommet italien du mont Cervin	Italy, Switzerland	4476,4 m	Pennine Alps
Dom (Großer Gendarm)	Switzerland	4468 m	Pennine Alps
Aiguille de la Belle Etoile	Italy	4349 m	Mont Blanc Massif
Grand Gendarme (Weisshorn)	Switzerland	4331 m	Pennine Alps
Pointe Mieulet	France	4287 m	Mont Blanc Massif
Liskammnase	Italy, Switzerland	4272 m	Pennine Alps
Pointe Bayeux	France	4258 m	Mont Blanc Massif
Mont Blanc du Tacul (Punkt E)	France	4247 m	Mont Blanc Massif
Aiguille du Croissant	Switzerland	4243 m	Pennine Alps
Pic Tyndall	Italy, Switzerland	4241 m	Pennine Alps
Picco Muzio	Italy, Switzerland	4187 m	Pennine Alps
Entdeckungsfels (Roccia della Scoperta)	Switzerland	4178 m	Pennine Alps
Balmenhorn	Italy	4167 m	Pennine Alps
Alphubel south top	Switzerland	4166 m	Pennine Alps
Dent d'Hérens la Corne	Switzerland	4148 m	Pennine Alps
Pointe Burnaby	Switzerland	4135 m	Pennine Alps
Alphubel Nordostgipfel	Switzerland	4128 m	Pennine Alps
Alphubel Nordgipfel	Switzerland	4116 m	Pennine Alps
Rimpfischhorn (Großer Gendarm)	Switzerland	4108 m	Pennine Alps
Aiguille Blanche de Peuterey (Pointe SO)	Italy	4107 m	Mont Blanc Massif
Pointe de l'Androsace	France, Italy	4107 m	Mont Blanc Massif
Aiguille Blanche de Peuterey (Pointe NW)	Italy	4104 m	Mont Blanc Massif
Dent Blanche (Grand Gendarme)	Switzerland	4097 m	Pennine Alps
Felikhorn	Italy	4093 m	Pennine Alps
Lenzspitze Großer Gendarm	Switzerland	4091 m	Pennine Alps
Wengen Jungfrau	Switzerland	4089 m	Bernese Alps
Combin de la Tsessette gendarme (south-east)	Switzerland	4088 m	Pennine Alps
Pic Lory	France	4086 m	Dauphiné Alps
Dent d'Hérens Gendarme Crochu	Switzerland	4075 m	Pennine Alps
Pilier du Diable	France	4067 m	Mont Blanc Massif
Terzo pilastro del Col Maudit	France	4064 m	Pennine Alps
Pointe Bravais	France	4057 m	Mont Blanc Massif
Pic Eccles	Italy	4041 m	Mont Blanc Massif
Dent d'Hérens, L'Epaule	Italy, Switzerland	4040 m	Pennine Alps
Gendarme del Col Maudit	France	4032 m	Mont Blanc Massif
Il Roc	Italy	4026 m	Graian Alps
Pointe Eveline	France	4026 m	Mont Blanc Massif
Pointe Croux	France	4023 m	Mont Blanc Massif
La Spedla / Punta Perrucchetti	Italy, Switzerland	4020 m	Bernina Range
L'Epaule	Switzerland	4017 m	Pennine Alps
Piton des Italiens	France, Italy	4003 m	Mont Blanc Massif

== Number of Alpine four-thousanders and distribution ==
Since no exact and formal definition of a 'mountain' exists, the number of 4000-metre summits is arbitrary. The topographic prominence is an important factor to decide the official nomination of a summit. The 'Official list' proposed by the UIAA is based not only on prominence but also on other criteria such as the morphology (general appearance) and mountaineering interest. Summits such as Punta Giordani or Mont Blanc de Courmayeur have much less than the 30 metres minimum prominence criterion but are included in the list because of the other criteria. In comparison, the official 14 eight-thousanders recognised by the UIAA have all a prominence of over 600 metres (despite a proposed expansion). A minimum prominence criterion of 300 metres (Note: Such as the one used in List of prominent mountains of the Alps above 3000 m) would reduce the number of Alpine four-thousanders to only 29, whilst a prominence criterion of 100 metres would raise it to 49.

The table below gives the number of four-thousanders as a function of their minimum prominence.

	Minimum prominence								UIAA list	Enlarged list	Karl Blodig list
Country / Range	2,000 metres (6,562 ft)	1,500 metres (4,921 ft) (Ultras)	1,000 metres (3,281 ft)	500 metres (1,640 ft)	300 metres (984 ft)	200 metres (656 ft)	100 metres (328 ft)	30 metres (98 ft)	-	-	-
Switzerland	3	4	9	17	24	28	37	46	48	71	41
Italy	1	2	3	5	7	8	20	31	38	60	25
France	2	2	2	4	4	6	11	20	25	41	13
Pennine	1	2	6	11	15	19	26	38	41	65	34
Mont Blanc	1	1	1	3	3	5	11	23	28	46	15
Bernese	1	1	2	5	7	7	9	9	9	10	9
Dauphiné	1	1	1	1	1	1	1	1	2	3	1
Bernina	1	1	1	1	1	1	1	1	1	2	1
Graian	0	1	1	1	1	1	1	1	1	2	1
Total	5	7	12	22	29	35	51	73	82	128	61

== See also ==
- List of mountain lists – list of peak-bagging lists

== Bibliography ==
- Dumler, Helmut and Willi P. Burkhardt, The High Mountains of the Alps, Diadem, 1994 (ISBN 0-906371-43-0)
- Goedeke, Richard, Alpine 4000m Peaks by the Classic Routes, (2nd ed.) Menasha Ridge Press, 1997 (ISBN 0-89732-111-1)
- Goedeke, Richard, 4000er Tourenführer, Die Normalrouten auf alle Viertausender der Alpen, Bruckmann 01.04.2022 ISBN 978-3-7343-2419-2
- McLewin, Will, In Monte Viso’s Horizon: Climbing All the Alpine 4000m Peaks, Ernest Press, 1991 (ISBN 0-948153-09-1)
- Moran, Martin, The 4000m Peaks of the Alps: Selected Climbs, Alpine Club, 2007 (ISBN 0-900523-66-2)
- Club 4000, Tutti i 4000 - L'aria sottile dell'alta quota, Vivalda Editori - CAI Torino, 2010 (ISBN 88-7480-135-1)
