= Schwarzhorn (Monte Rosa Massif) =

Summit in the Italian Alps

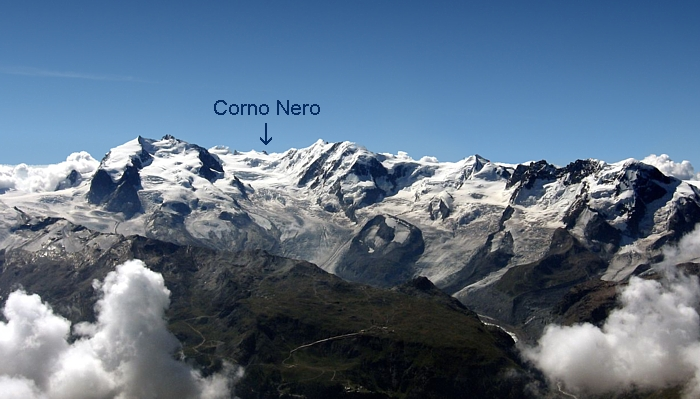
- The Corno Nero in the Monte Rosa massif

Highest point
- Elevation: 4,321 m (14,177 ft)
- Prominence: 42 m (138 ft) ↓ Wind gap to the Ludwigshöhe
- Isolation: 0.3 km (0.19 mi) → Ludwigshöhe
- Coordinates: 45°54′54″N 7°51′43″E

Naming
- Native name: Corno Nero (Italian)

Geography
- Location within Italy
- Location: Aosta Valley/Piedmont
- Country: Italy
- Parent range: Pennine Alps

Climbing
- First ascent: 18 August 1873 by Marco Maglionini, Albert de Rothschild and guide
- Normal route: Glacier tours through the southwest and northwest flanks (WS)

The Schwarzhorn (Italian: Corno Nero) is a 4,321-metre-high summit in the Italian Alps just next to the Swiss border.

It is part of the Monte Rosa massif in the Wallis Alps, which lie on the border between Switzerland and Italy. The Schwarzhorn itself lies on the ridge running south from the Ludwigshöhe to the Vincent Pyramid. Its valley settlements are Zermatt in Switzerland and Alagna on the Italian side.

== See also ==
- List of 4000 metre peaks of the Alps
