= Humphrey Owen Jones =

Welsh chemist and mountaineer

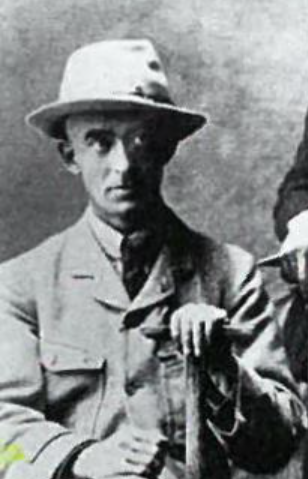
- Born: 20 February 1878; Goginan near Aberystwyth, Wales
- Died: 15 August 1912 (aged 34); Mont Blanc, Italy
- Scientific career
- Fields: Chemistry, mountaineering
- Workplaces: University of Cambridge

Humphrey Owen Jones (20 February 1878 – 15 August 1912) was a Welsh chemist and mountaineer.

== Life ==
Jones was born at Goginan, Cardiganshire, and educated at Lewis School, Pengam, and the University College of Wales, Aberystwyth. He subsequently studied natural sciences at Clare College, Cambridge, graduating BA in 1899 and MA in 1903. In 1904 he was admitted to the D.Sc. of the University of London.

On 1 August 1912 Jones married a colleague, Muriel Gwendolen Edwards, a keen climber and the first woman to be elected a Fellow of the University of Wales.

== Chemist ==
In 1901 he obtained an official appointment of demonstrator to the Jacksonian Professor of Natural Philosophy, Sir James Dewar, which he held up to the time of his death. He was elected in due course (1902) to a Fellowship at Clare College where he subsequently became lecturer. For eleven years Jones devoted most of his time to teaching in the university laboratory and to the supervision of the science students of his college. His scientific advice extended to students outside his college, such as Annie Homer at Newnham College. Beyond this work with students, Jones was one of the most productive British chemists of his day and published more than 60 papers between 1900 and 1912.

Unlike many of his contemporaries, Jones had not visited foreign laboratories and even other English Universities. He gained his research experience entirely at Cambridge, working with Dewar and Fenton. With the latter he carried out his first experimental investigation on the "oxidation of organic acids in the presence of iron" (1900), and in 1904 prepared his own work on the stereochemistry of nitrogen. In 1907 and in 1909 he wrote the section on stereochemistry for the annual reports of the Chemical Society. The study of organic nitrogen bases led to his attempt to solve the difficult problem of the constitution and transformations of the aldol bases derived from the homologues of aniline. Meanwhile, Jones was assisting Dewar in very different investigations of the metallic (nickel and iron) carbonyls. These researches had made Jones familiar with low temperature manipulations and ultimately led to their discovery of carbon monosulfide. In this way Jones' attention was directed to organic sulphur compounds, particularly thio-oxalates, thiomalonates and thiophosphates. His eminence as an investigator was recognised in his election to the Royal Society in 1912. In the same year he was appointed to the Royal Commission on Fuel and Engines.

== Mountaineering ==
In 1907, Jones became a keen climber after receiving some tuition in Snowdonia. He went on to pioneer some of the most difficult climbs in that region, such as Paradise on Lliwedd, which he put up in 1909. His sister, Bronwen Ceridwen Jones (later Mawson), was also an accomplished climber. Together with Karl Blodig, Geoffrey Winthrop Young and the guide Josef Knubel of St Niklaus he made the first ascent of the Brouillard ridge to the summit of Mont Blanc on 9 August 1911. He thoroughly explored the Mont Blanc region and put up many new routes there. Already a member of the Committee of the Climbers' Club, in 1909 he was elected a member of the Alpine Club. The journals of both clubs contain several papers documenting his explorations.

== Death ==
Both Jones and his wife were killed in an accident on their honeymoon in Switzerland, while climbing the Aiguille Rouge de Peuterey 2941m a subpeak of Aiguille Noire de Peuterey on 15 August 1912 in Italy; their guide, Julius Truffer, slipped and fell on Jones, and all three dropped nearly 1,000 feet to the Fresnay Glacier. Alpinist Paul Preuss witnessed the accident. They were buried at Courmayeur, Italy. The north summit of the Aiguille Blanche de Peuterey was named La Pointe Jones in his honour.
