= Muzio =

Muzio is an Italian given name and surname.

Notable people with the given name include:

- Muzio Clementi (1752-1832), Italian composer
- Muzio Sforza (1369-1424), Italian nobleman and condottiero, father of Francesco I Sforza, Duke of Milan

Notable people with the surname include:

- Christine Muzio (born 1951), French fencer
- Claudia Muzio (1889–1936), Italian operatic soprano
- Emanuele Muzio (1821–1890), Italian composer, conductor and vocal teacher
- Giovanni Muzio (1893-1982), Italian architect
- Girolamo Muzio (1496–1576), Italian courtier, poet, and author in defence of the vernacular Italian language against Latin
- Gloria Muzio, American theatre and television director

== See also ==
- Picco Muzio
