= Pic Eccles =

Mountain in the Mont Blanc massif in the Aosta Valley, Italy

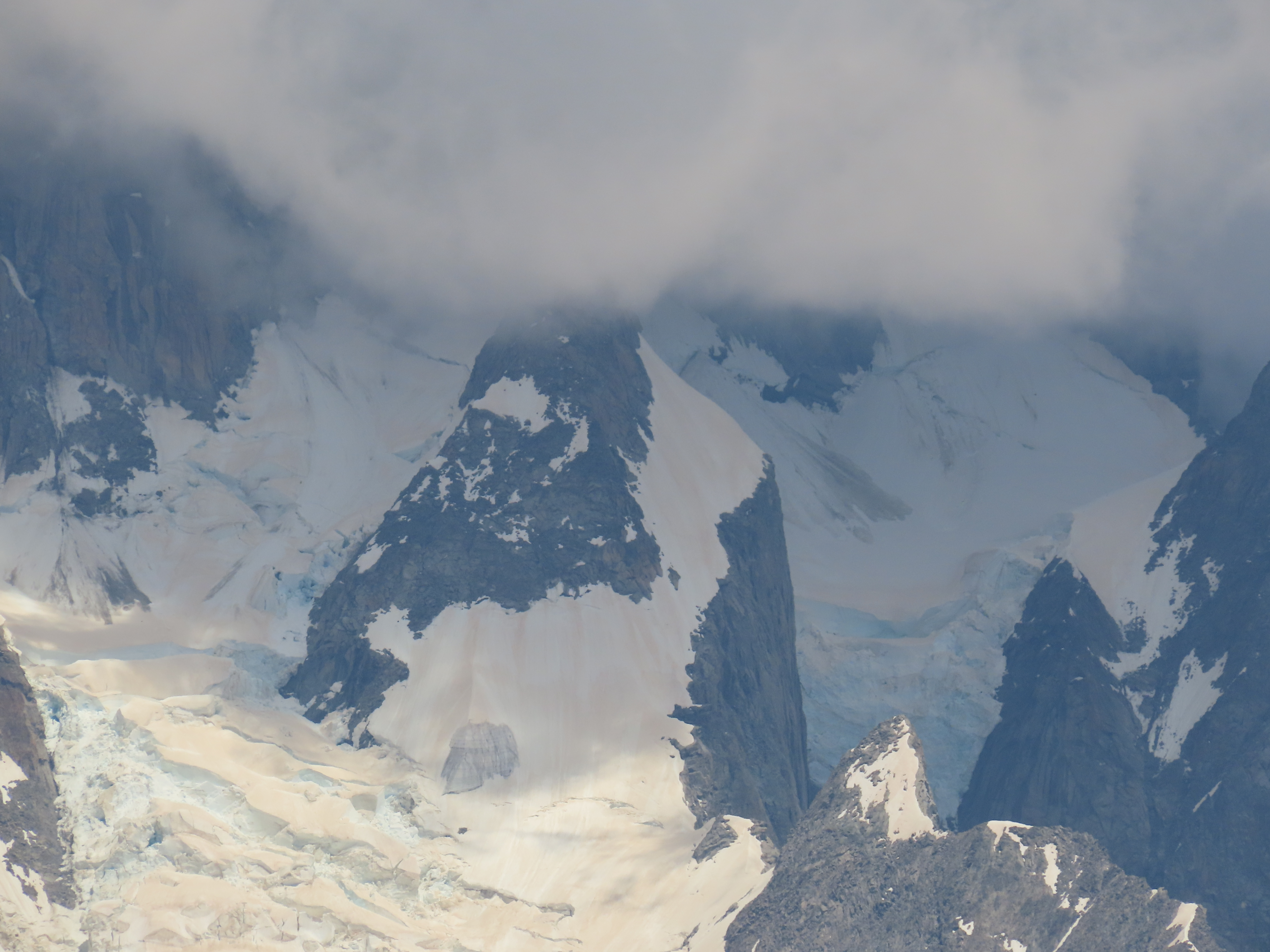

Highest point
- Elevation: 4,041 m (13,258 ft)
- Coordinates: 45°49′18″N 06°52′28″E

Geography
- Location within Italy
- Location: Aosta Valley, Italy
- Parent range: Mont Blanc massif

Climbing
- First ascent: Probably on 31 August 1874 by J. G. A. Marshal with guides Johann Fisher and Ulrich Almer
- Easiest route: Via the Brouillard glacier from the refuge Monzino, passing the Eccles bivouac hut

Pic Eccles (4,041 m) is a mountain in the Mont Blanc massif in the Aosta Valley, Italy. It lies at the foot of the Innominata ridge to the summit of Mont Blanc. The mountain is named after the English mountaineer and geologist James Eccles.

Although the mountain was probably climbed on 31 August 1874 by J. G. A. Marshal with guides Johann Fisher and Ulrich Almer, the first certain ascent was on 30–31 August 1877 by James Eccles with guides Alphonse and Michel Payot during the first ascent of Mont Blanc de Courmayeur.

== See also ==
- List of Alpine four-thousanders
