= Aiguilles du Diable =

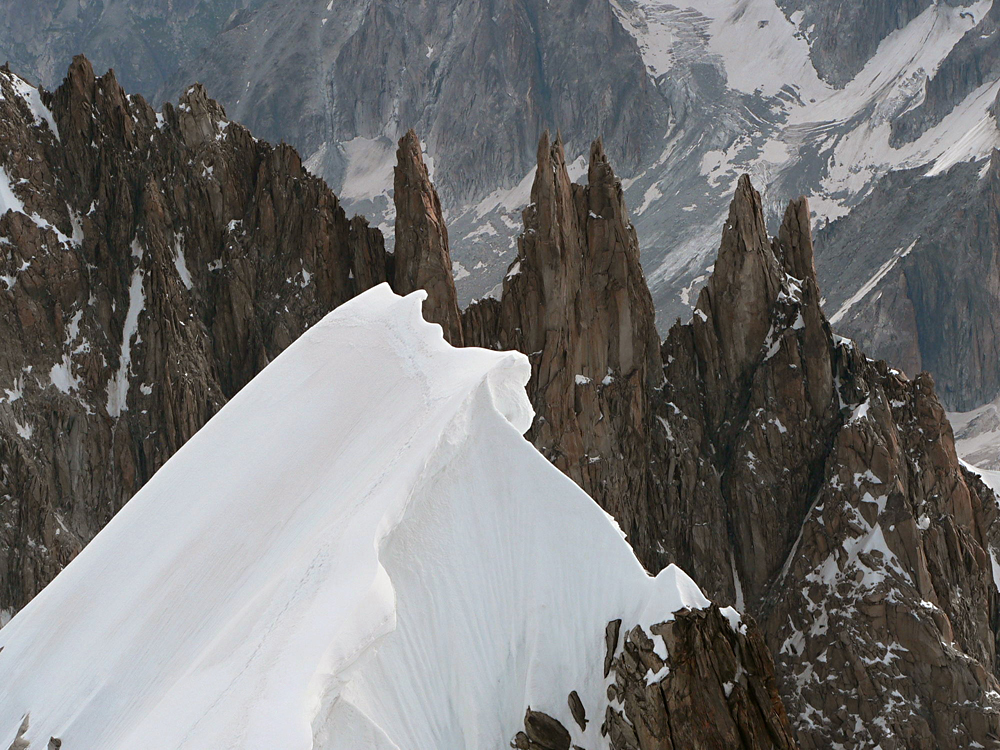

Highest point
- Elevation: 4,114 m (13,497 ft)
- Coordinates: 45°51′17″N 06°53′25″E

Geography
- Location within France
- Location: Haute-Savoie, France
- Parent range: Mont Blanc Massif

Climbing
- First ascent: 8 July 1925, by Armand Charlet and Antoine Blanchet.

The Aiguilles du Diable (literally "Devil's Needles", German: Teufelsspitzen) are a group of five rock needles, all over 4,000 metres high, on the southeast arête (also called the Teufelsgrat or Devil's Ridge) of the Mont Blanc du Tacul. The pinnacles lie within the French part of the Mont Blanc Massif in the departement of Haute-Savoie. The highest needle is L’Isolée (4,114 m), followed by Pointe Carmen (4,109 m), Pointe Médiane (4,097 m), Pointe Chaubert (4,074 m) and Corne du Diable (4,064 m).

The first needle to be climbed was Pointe Carmen in 1923 which was conquered by Brégault, Chevalier and De Lépiney. In 1925 the others were first climbed: initially L’Isolée by Antoine Blanchet and Armand Charlet, then Corne du Diable and Pointe Chaubert by Armand Charlet and Jean Chaubert. The last to be ascended was Pointe Médiane by Antoine Blanchet, Jean Chaubert, Armand Charlet and Devouassoud. The first time all the needles were climbed in a single expedition was in 1928 by the Americans, Miriam O'Brien and Robert L. M. Underhill with Armand Charlet guiding them.

Today a crossing of the Aiguilles du Diable is usually done as a rock climbing tour, which, in summer, avoids almost any contact with snow. The overall difficulty is assessed as "difficult" on the SAC scale and climbing grade V+ on the UIAA scale.

== See also ==
- List of 4000 metre peaks of the Alps
