= Ludwig Purtscheller =

Austrian mountaineer and teacher

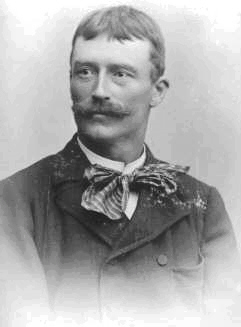

Personal information
- Nationality: Austrian
- Born: 6 October 1849 Innsbruck, Austrian Empire
- Died: 3 March 1900 (aged 50) Bern, Switzerland
- Occupations: Mountaineer, teacher

Climbing career
- Known for: Kilimanjaro first ascent; Meije first traverse

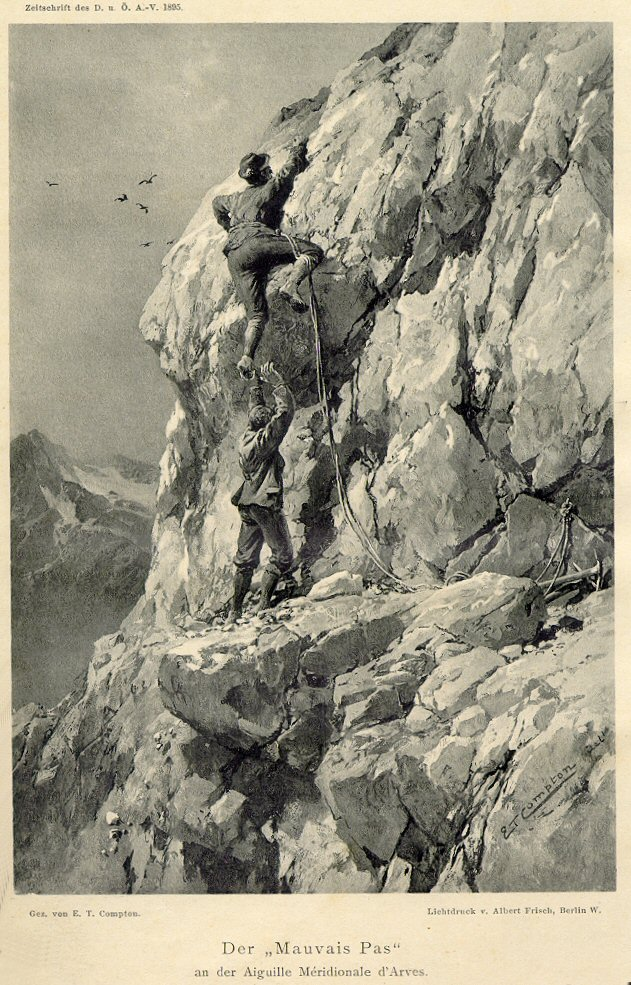
The 'bad step' on the Aiguille Méridionale d’Arves showing L. Purtscheller and Karl Blodig. Illustration by E.Compton, 1895.

Ludwig Purtscheller (6 October 1849 – 3 March 1900) was an Austrian mountaineer and teacher.

Purtscheller pioneered climbing without a mountain guide, who in the 19th century did all the route finding and lead climbing. By the end of his life he had recorded climbing over 1,700 mountains. A celebrated climb was the traverse of the Meije together with the Zsigmondy brothers in 1885, which to this date is considered a classic alpine route. He is best known as the first European to ascend Kilimanjaro in 1889, together with the German mountaineer Hans Meyer.

After a descent of the Aiguille du Dru with G. Löwenbach and Jakob Oberhollenzer on 25 August 1899, an ice axe broke and the rope team fell into a bergschrund. Purtscheller was injured and he was transferred to a hospital in Geneva and later Bern. After several months of recovery, he contracted pneumonia and died on the approximate date of his planned return home. In a eulogy, the American climber and mountain historian W.A.B. Coolidge called him "the greatest mountaineer who had ever lived".
