= Wengen Jungfrau =

Mountain in Switzerland

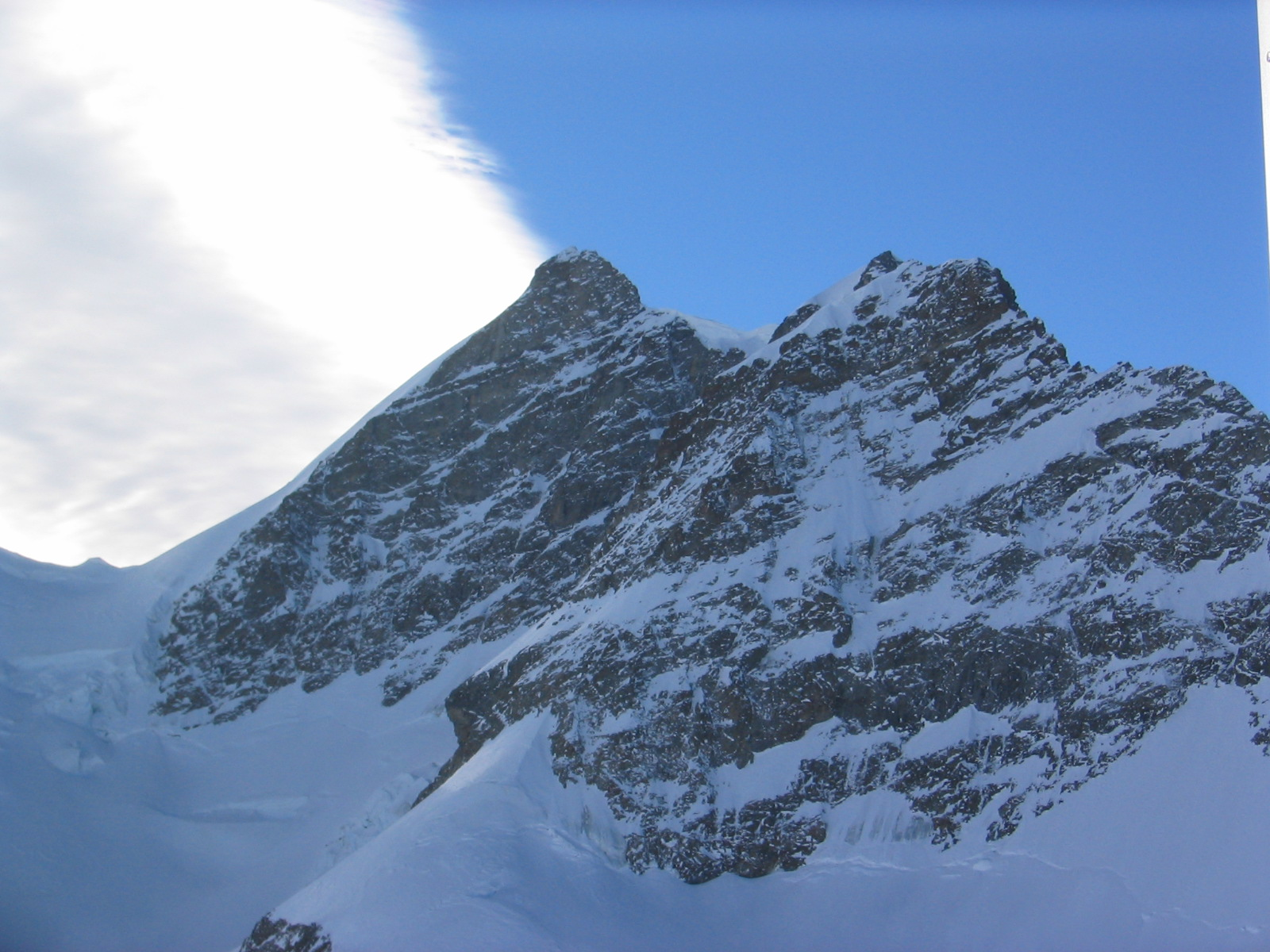
- The Jungfrau and the Wengen Jungfrau (right) from the east side

Highest point
- Elevation: 4,085 m (13,402 ft)
- Prominence: 26 m (85 ft)
- Parent peak: Jungfrau
- Coordinates: 46°32′22.6″N 7°57′48.1″E

Geography
- Location within Switzerland
- Location: Bern/Valais, Switzerland
- Parent range: Bernese Alps

The Wengen Jungfrau is a summit of the Bernese Alps, north of the Jungfrau.

It sits on the border between the Swiss cantons of Bern and Valais.

it was included in the enlarged list of the alpine four-thousanders because of its lack of prominence.
