= Karl Blodig =

Austrian mountaineer, optician, and writer

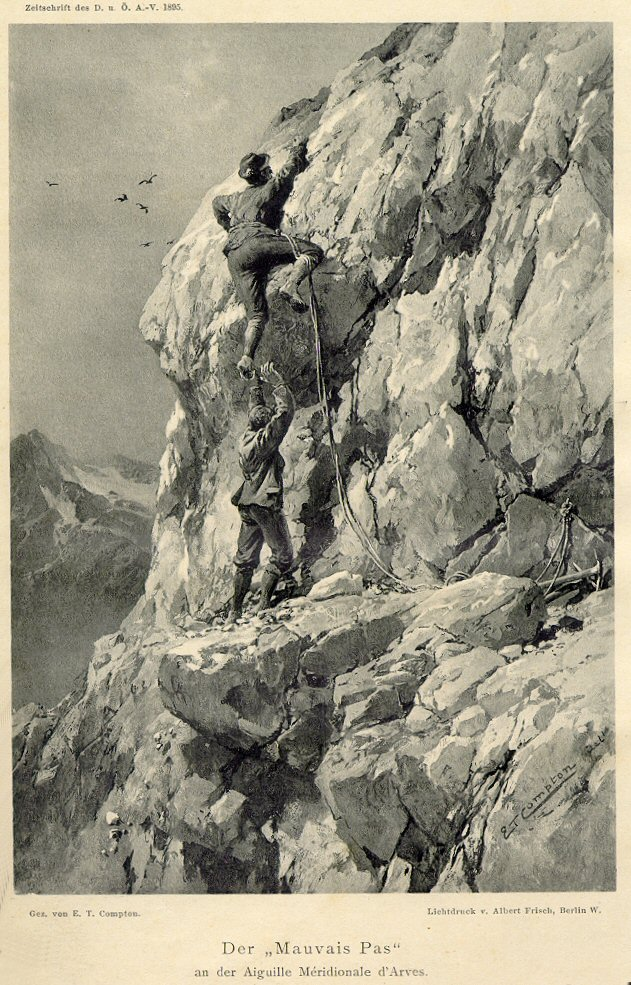
- The 'bad step' on the Aiguille Méridionale d’Arves showing L. Purtscheller and Karl Blodig. Illustration by E.Compton, 1895

Personal information
- Nationality: Austrian
- Born: 16 October 1859 Vienna, Austrian Empire
- Died: 7 September 1956 (aged 96) Bregenz, Austria
- Occupations: Mountaineer, optician, writer

Climbing career
- First ascents: Mont Brouillard
- Known for: First to climb all Alpine four-thousanders

Karl Blodig (16 October 1859 – 7 September 1956) was an Austrian mountaineer, optician, and writer. Blodig was the first to successfully climb all Alpine peaks of over 4000 meters, completing his final summit around 1911. He wrote about these climbs in his book Die Viertausender der Alpen (The Four-Thousanders of the Alps), first published in 1923.

== Mountaineering Life ==
Born in Vienna, Blodig spent his early years in Graz, climbing Mount Triglav while still in his teens. At the age of twenty he climbed Monte Rosa, guided by Christian Ranggetiner, and by twenty-three he had made non-guided ascents of the Dufourspitze, Zumsteinspitze, and Weisshorn. Between 1890 and 1911 he succeeded in climbing the remaining peaks to achieve all those summits that were at that time listed as being over 4,000 m in height. These achievements included first ascents of the Brouillard Ridge on Mont Blanc as well as the first traverse of the Rochefort Ridge. Among his alpine climbing partners were Ludwig Purtscheller and the Alpine artist Edward Theodore Compton.

Around 1911 Blodig was part of a regular mountaineering meeting at Pen-y-Pass in Wales, among whom was George Mallory. Blodig observed Mallory expertly tackling a crux pitch of a very difficult ice chimney. Even though all the climbing friends present were impressed by Mallory's skill as a climber, Blodig later observed rather prophetically about Mallory that: "that young man will not be alive for long!"

In 1932, and at the age of 73, Blodig undertook solo ascents of the Aiguille du Jardin and the Grande Rocheuse in order to achieve summits that had subsequently been added to the recognised list of 4,000 m peaks since his 1911 achievement.

== Works ==
- Die Viertausender der Alpen. Munich: Bergverlag Rudolf Rother, 1923.
- Bilder aus Vorarlberg und Liechtenstein, no year.
- Durch's Montafon. Mit Karte aus Gerster’s Handkarte von Vorarlberg 1:175.000. Bregenz: J. N. Teutsch, no year.
- Vorarlberg das österreichische Rheinland. Ein Führer durch die Sommerfrischen Wintersportplätze, Berge und Täler des Landes. Bregenz, 1928.
- Die Viertausender der Alpen, 2nd ed., Munich: Bergverlag Rudolf Rother, no year, ISBN 3-7633-7429-9 (with Helmut Dumler).
- Die Viertausender der Alpen, 5th ed., Munich: Bergverlag Rudolf Rother, 1968 (with Helmut Dumler).
