= Armand Charlet =

French mountaineer and mountain guide

Charlet on the cover of Vocation Alpine

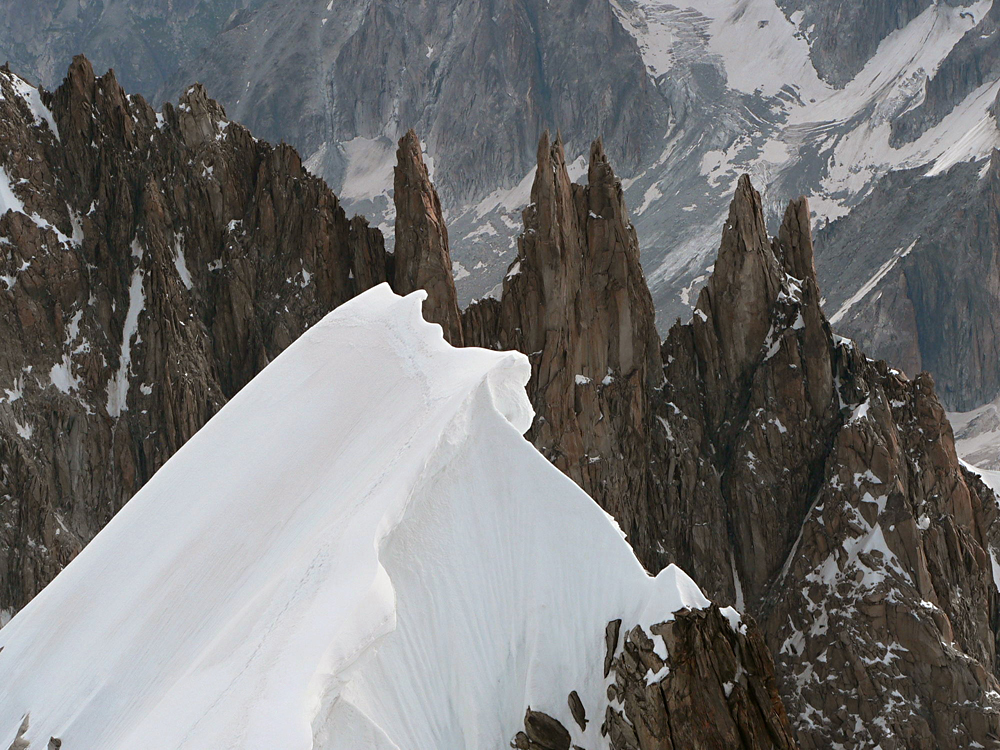
The Aiguilles du Diable. Charlet made the first ascent of these pinnacled rock peaks, as well as the first traverse, which included a celebrated move on L'Isolée, the isolated pinnacle just left of centre.

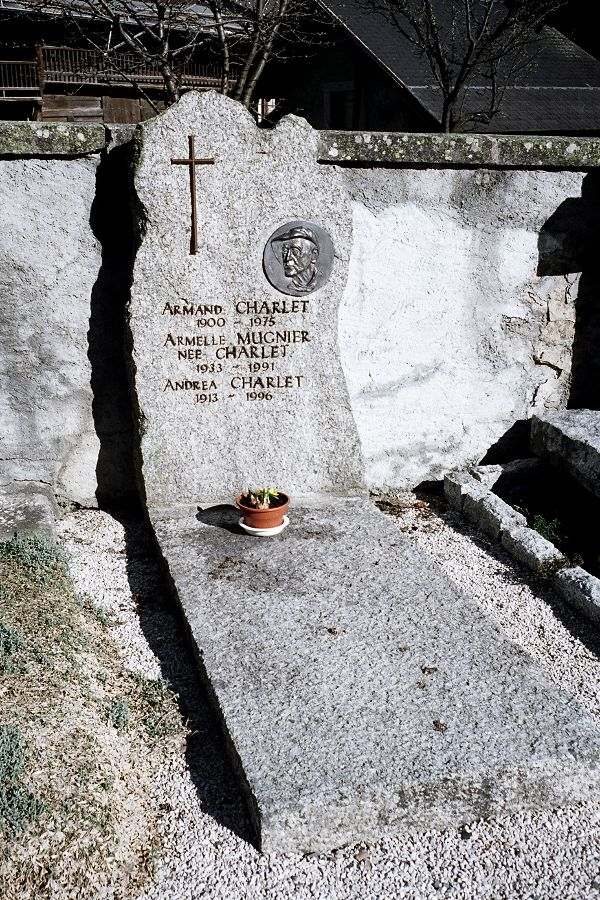
Charlet's tomb in Argentière

Armand Charlet (9 February 1900, Argentière – December 1975) was a French mountaineer and mountain guide.

== Alpinism ==
Charlet was amongst the most celebrated mountaineers and guides of his era. Alain de Chatellus regarded him as the "undisputed leader and lighthouse of his generation," Claire Engel commented,

[He was] head and shoulders above anyone else. His name has been associated for almost fifty years with the toughest climbs in the range of Mont Blanc. All those who have been with him in the mountains have been struck by his impressive, almost tragic face, his intelligence and culture, and above all by his speed and poise when climbing,

and Wilfrid Noyce stated that "It was amusing to note how Armand's pre-eminence was recognized by the other guides and hut-keepers. His word was law."

He made 3,000 ascents and guided over 1,200 friends and clients – of whom a third were women. He specialised in ascents of the Aiguille Verte in the Mont Blanc massif, which he climbed 100 times by fourteen different routes, including seven first ascents, among them the direct line on the Couturier couloir, climbed on 1 July 1932 with Alfred Couttet and Georges Devouassoux. He also made the first ascent of the wildly pinnacled Aiguilles du Diable. In 1928 he made the first attempt on the north face of the Grandes Jorasses, one of the six great north faces of the Alps, via the Croz Spur. His party did not use pitons or any artificial devices and did not progress far up the face. He made another unsuccessful attempt in 1934 with Robert Greloz, a guide from Chamonix, reaching 11,800 ft on the face and, according to Gaston Rébuffat, "[causing] quite a stir at the time".

As a guide he also made first ascents with his clients; for example, on 4 August 1928 Charlet led Miriam O'Brien and Robert L. M. Underhill on the first traverse from the Aiguilles du Diable to Mont Blanc du Tacul, during which he overcame a Grade V pitch on L'Isolée with a jammed ice axe (today a piton is in place).

He taught at ENSA, the French national school of ski and alpinism, for many years and had a great influence on several generations of high-mountain guides. He was technical director of the school for twelve years from 1945.

He featured in many of the first mountain films, a genre that developed after the First World War. According to Engel:

Specialists could recognize or discover every detail of the routes and study the climbing technique of the actors, a fascinating process when one could watch Armand Charlet hauling himself over a narrow ledge.

He was the central character in À l'assaut des aiguilles du Diable (Marcel Ichac, 1942), a mountain film that Engel rates as "little short of a masterpiece".

During the Second World War, Charlet used his mountaineering skills in assisting people to cross the frontier, in defiance of the Germans.

== Selected climbs ==
- 1924–1935 Many first ascents on the Aiguille Verte
- 1925, 8 July, first ascent of the Aiguilles du Diable (with Antoine Blanchet)
- 1929, 19 July, directissima on the north face of the Aiguille du Plan
- 1929, first ascent of the north ridge of the Dent du Géant
- 1932, 22 July, first route on the north face of the Aiguille du Jardin (with Jules Simond and P. Dillemann)
- 1938, 25 February, first winter traverse of the Aiguille du Dru (with Camille Devouassoux)

== Awards and commemoration ==
- Charlet was an Officier de la Légion d'honneur. The French government awarded him two gold medals for his work in mountain rescue.
- The Col Armand Charlet (3,998 m) on the Aiguille Verte is named after him. Together with Paul Dillemann he made the first ascent of the col from the north.

== Bibliography ==
- Armand Charlet, Alpine Vocation, ed. Victor Attinger (1949)
- Douglas Busk, Armand Charlet: portrait d'un guide, Arthaud, Grenoble (1974)
