= Dôme de Rochefort =

Mountain in the Mont Blanc massif in Haute-Savoie, France and of Aosta Valley, Italy

- Location within Alps

Highest point
- Elevation: 4,015 m (13,173 ft)
- Coordinates: 45°51′51″N 06°58′03″E

Geography
- Location: Haute-Savoie, France; Aosta Valley, Italy
- Parent range: Mont Blanc Massif

Climbing
- First ascent: 12 August 1881 by James Eccles with Alphonse and Michel Payot

The Dôme de Rochefort (Italian: Dôme de Rochefort) (4,015 m) is a mountain in the Mont Blanc massif in Haute-Savoie, France and of Aosta Valley, Italy.

== See also ==
- List of 4000 metre peaks of the Alps
