= Josef Knubel =

Swiss mountaineer and mountain guide

Josef Knubel (2 March 1881 – 31 May 1961) was a Swiss mountaineer and mountain guide. He made many first ascents and other climbs in the Alps during his career. He is best known for his ascents as a guide for Geoffrey Winthrop Young.

== Early life and family ==
Josef Knubel was born in 1881 at St. Niklaus, Switzerland. His father was Peter Knubel, a mountain guide and carpenter; the Knubel family were collectively well-known for their mountaineering skills.

== Mountaineering career ==
Knubel began climbing mountains at a young age, and climbed the Matterhorn for the first time in 1896, at fifteen years old, with his father and a client. His first major client was Oliver Perry-Smith, an American climber who hired Knubel to guide him through the Alps in 1903; together, they ascended the Matterhorn, Wellenkuppe, Zinalrothorn, Weisshorn, Lyskamm, Ober Gabelhorn, Dent Blanche, and Täschhorn.

Knubel became an official mountain guide in 1904 upon receiving his guide's licence, while continuing to work as a stonemason and tree feller. His mountaineering skills were noticed by British climber Geoffrey Winthrop Young, who hired Knubel as his guide. From 1906 to 1914, Young and Knubel climbed together each summer, making a number of first ascents together, including the Täschhorn's south face, the Weisshorn's southeast and northeast faces, the Rimpfischhorn and Zinalrothorn's east faces, the Gspaltenhorn's west face, Grandes Jorasses' west ridge, and Mont Brouillard. The route the two mapped out to reach the summit of Aiguille du Plan in 1907 is still the route used by most alpine climbers today. On Young's first ascent of the east face of the Aiguille du Grépon with several other climbers and Knubel and Henri Brocherel as guides in 1911, Knubel used an ice axe instead of a piton to clear an overhang; the spot was thereafter known as "The Knubel Crack".

Knubel was taught to ski by Arnold Lunn and later began to use skis while traversing mountain ranges. In February 1920, Knubel and Marcel Kurz, using skis, made the first winter ascents of the Wellenkuppe, Ober Gabelhorn, Schallihorn, and Täschhorn. He became an authorised ski-guide in 1925. Throughout his career, he made over 800 ascents of Alpine peaks higher than 4,000 metres (13,000 ft) ("four-thousanders") and led around 120 clients.

== Later life and death ==
Knubel was forced to end his climbing career by a knee injury sustained while climbing the Ortler. He died at Visp on 31 May 1961 after undergoing abdominal surgery—related to an episode of appendicitis earlier in his life—and was buried at his hometown of St. Niklaus.
