= Vincent Pyramid =

Mountain in the Pennine Alps

- Pyramide Vincent
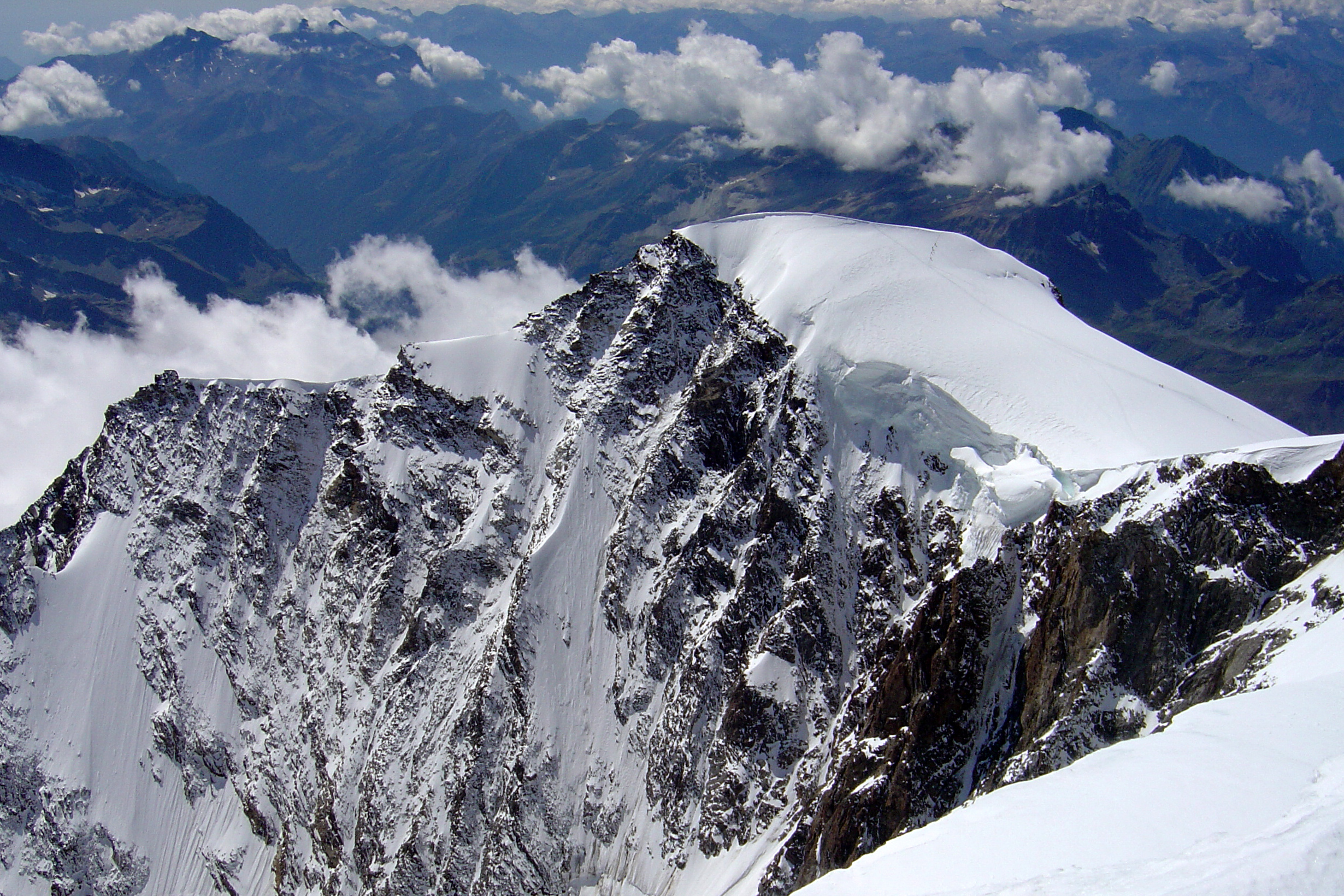
- View from the Parrotspitze (north side), with the Punta Giordani on the left

Highest point
- Elevation: 4,215 m (13,829 ft)
- Prominence: 128 m (420 ft)
- Parent peak: Dufourspitze
- Coordinates: 45°54′28″N 7°51′43″E

Naming
- Native name: Vincentpiramid (Walser); Pyramide Vincent (French); Piramide Vincent (Italian)

Geography
- Location within Alps
- Country: Italy
- Regions: Aosta Valley and Piedmont
- Parent range: Pennine Alps

Climbing
- First ascent: 15 August 1819 by the brothers Nicolas and Joseph Vincent from Gressoney-Saint-Jean

The Vincent Pyramid (Walser German: Vincentpiramid, French: Pyramide Vincent, Italian: Piramide Vincent) (4,215 m (13,829 ft)) is a mountain of the Pennine Alps, located on the border between the Italian regions of Aosta Valley and Piedmont. The Vincent Pyramid makes up a large buttress of the huge multi-summited Monte Rosa. It lies south of the Ludwigshöhe on the border with Switzerland, between the Lysgletscher and the Piode Glacier. A secondary summit of the Vincent Pyramid, the Punta Giordani/Giordanispétz (4,046 m (13,274 ft)), lies to the southeast. Both Vincent Pyramid and Punta Giordani are on the official UIAA list of Alpine four-thousanders.

The Vincent Pyramid summit was successfully climbed on 15 August 1819 by the brothers Nicolas (Johann Nikolaus) and Joseph Vincent from Gressoney-Saint-Jean, after whom the peak has been named.

It is one of the few peaks on Monte Rosa to lie entirely within Italian territory and is the fourth highest peak, completely in Italy. It is normally ascended from the Gnifetti Hut at the foot of the Lys Glacier and is rated as PD (Peu Difficile); a straightforward introduction to alpine climbing and often ascended in conjunction with another peak on Monte Rosa.

== See also ==
- List of 4000 metre peaks of the Alps
