= Picco Muzio =

Mountain in Switzerland

- French: Pic Muzio
- Location within Alps

Highest point
- Elevation: 4,187 m (13,737 ft)
- Parent peak: Matterhorn
- Coordinates: 45°58′30.7″N 7°39′39.4″E

Geography
- Location: Switzerland / Italy
- Parent range: Pennine Alps

Picco Muzio (French: Pic Muzio) is a minor summit below the Matterhorn on the Furggen ridge. Because of its prominence on that ridge, it was included in the 'enlarged list' of alpine four-thousanders.
