= William Edward Hall =

English lawyer and mountaineer

- Born: 22 August 1835; Leatherhead, Surrey, England
- Died: 30 November 1894 (aged 59); Coker Court, Somerset
- Education: University College, Oxford
- Occupation: Lawyer
- Known for: Works on international law. First ascents of Lyskamm, 1861; Dent d'Hérens, 1863; Parrotspitze, 1863
- Spouse(s): Imogen Emily, daughter of William Robert Grove

William Edward Hall (22 August 1835 – 30 November 1894) was an English lawyer and mountaineer who published some influential works on international law.

== Early life ==
Hall was the only child of William Hall, a doctor and descendant of a junior branch of the "Halls of Dunglass", and of Charlotte née Cotton.

He was born at Leatherhead, Surrey, but spent his childhood abroad, his father acting as physician to the King of Hanover, and subsequently to the British legation at Naples. Hence, perhaps, the son's taste in later life for art and modern languages. He was educated privately till, at the early age of seventeen, he matriculated at University College, Oxford, where in 1856 he took his degree with a first class in the then recently instituted school of law and history, gaining, three years afterwards, the Chancellor's prize for an essay upon the effect on Spain of the discovery of the precious metals in America.

In 1861, he was called to the bar at Lincoln's Inn, but devoted little time to any serious attempt to establish a legal practice. He was more interested in the study of Italian art, and in travelling Europe, always bringing home admirable water-colour drawings of buildings and scenery. He was an early and enthusiastic member of the Alpine Club, making several first ascents, notably that of the Lyskamm. He did however, exploit his legal profession in pursuit of his appetite for exploration in an expedition to South America to collect evidence on behalf of the Tichborne claimant, Arthur Orton.

== Military interests ==
He was always much interested in military matters, and was under fire, on the Danish side, in the Second Schleswig War in 1864. In 1867 he published a pamphlet entitled A Plan for the Reorganization of the Army, in which he advocated national service. According to some, "He would undoubtedly have made his mark in the army" but was overwhelming attracted to life as a member of the landed gentry. He realised the latter ambition, first at Llanfihangel Crucorney, Monmouthshire, and then at Coker Court near Yeovil, Somerset. By all accounts he became, "the English country gentleman, with cosmopolitan experiences, encyclopaedic knowledge, and artistic feeling."

His travels took him to Lapland, Egypt, South America and India. He performed valuable service for several government offices, in 1871 as inspector of returns under the Elementary Education Act 1870, in 1877 by reports to the Board of Trade on oyster fisheries, in France as well as in England. All the time, he was amassing materials for ambitious works on the history of civilization, and of the British Empire.

His principal fame rests on his work on international law. In 1874 he published a book on the doctrine of neutrality, Rights and Duties of Neutrals. He followed this in 1880 by his magnum opus, his Treatise on International Law. Seen by some as "unquestionably the best book upon the subject in the English language", the book was, according to the legal author Arthur Nussbaum, well planned and exact, using crisp English and avoiding some of the "rhetorical vagueness" of earlier works on the subject. In 1894 Hall published a book on, the Foreign Jurisdictions of the British Crown.

== Mountaineering ==
Hall was an active member of the Alpine Club. He was one of the party which, in 1861, made the first ascent of the Lyskamm. In 1863 he made the first ascent of the Dent d'Hérens on 12 August, followed a few days later by the first ascent of the Parrotspitze on 16 August.

== Private life ==
Hall married Imogen, daughter of William Robert Grove in 1866. Imogen died in 1886 and in 1891 Hall married Alice Hill. Hall had no children by either marriage. He died suddenly at Coker Court, Somerset.

== Honours ==
- Institut de Droit International:
  - Associ (1875)
  - Membre (1882)

== Bibliography ==
- Butler, A. J. (1895). "In memoriam: William Edward Hall" (PDF). Alpine Journal. 17: 443–444.
- Holland, T. E. (1895). "In memoriam, W. E. Hall". Law Quarterly Review. XI: 113–117 – via Internet Archive.
- Holland, Thomas Erskine (1898). "William Edward Hall". Studies in International Law. Oxford: Clarendon Press. pp. 302–305 – via Internet Archive.
- Holland, Thomas Erskine (1901). "Hall, William Edward" . In Lee, Sidney (ed.). Dictionary of National Biography (1st supplement). London: Smith, Elder & Co.
- — (2004) "Hall, William Edward (1835–1894)", rev. Catherine Pease-Watkin, Oxford Dictionary of National Biography, Oxford University Press, accessed 22 September 2007 (subscription, Wikipedia Library access or UK public library membership required)
