= Grande Rocheuse =

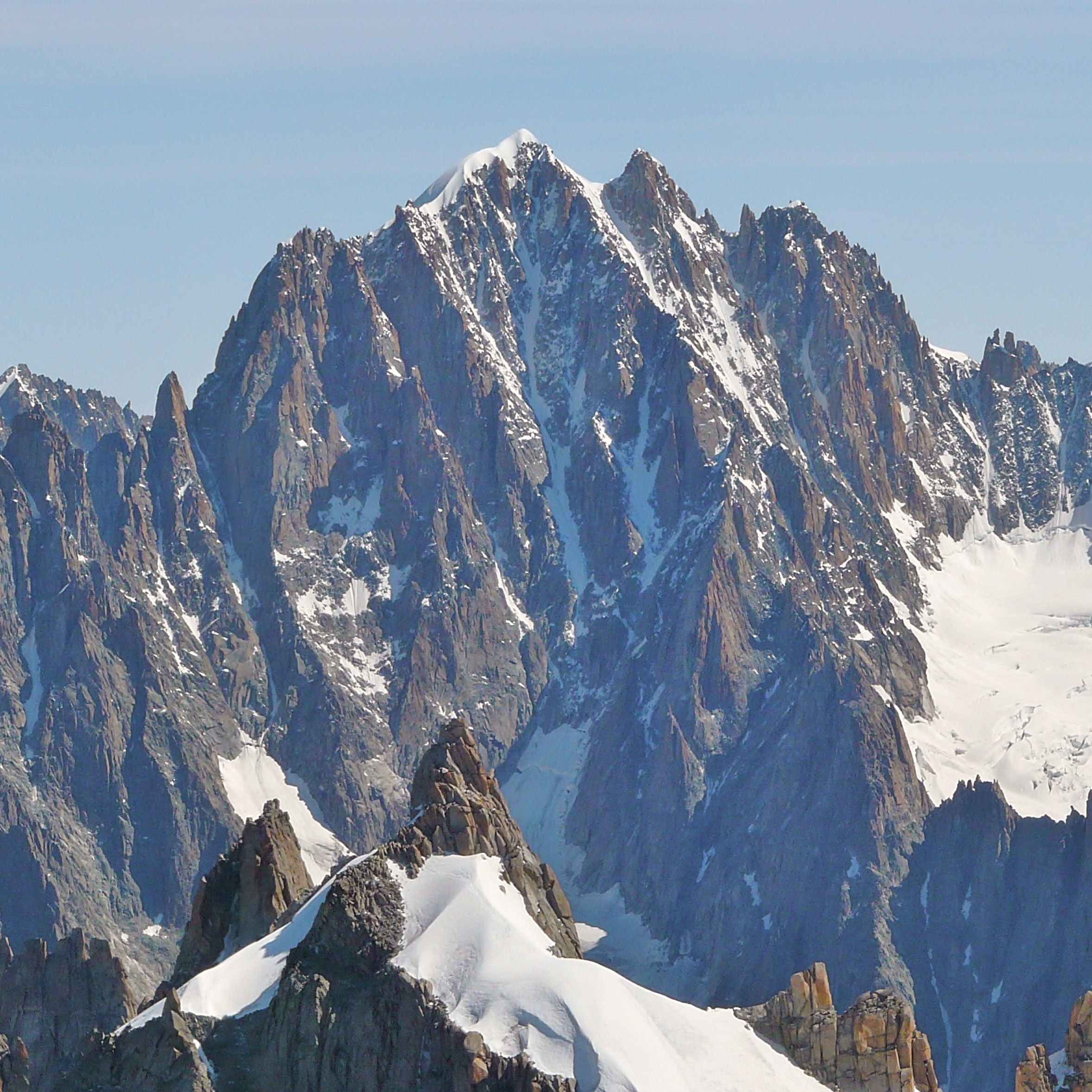
- The south face of Aiguille Verte (4,122 m). To the right of the high summit are Grande Rocheuse (4,102 m) and Aiguille du Jardin (4,035 m).

Highest point
- Elevation: 4,102 m (13,458 ft)
- Coordinates: 45°56′04″N 06°58′22″E

Geography
- Location within France
- Location: Haute-Savoie, France
- Parent range: Mont Blanc Massif

Grande Rocheuse (4,102 m) is a summit on the east ridge of Aiguille Verte in the Mont Blanc massif in Haute-Savoie, France.

== See also ==
- List of 4000 metre peaks of the Alps
