= Punta Baretti =

Mountain in the Mont Blanc Massif in the Val d'Aosta, Italy

Punta Baretti Pointe Baretti
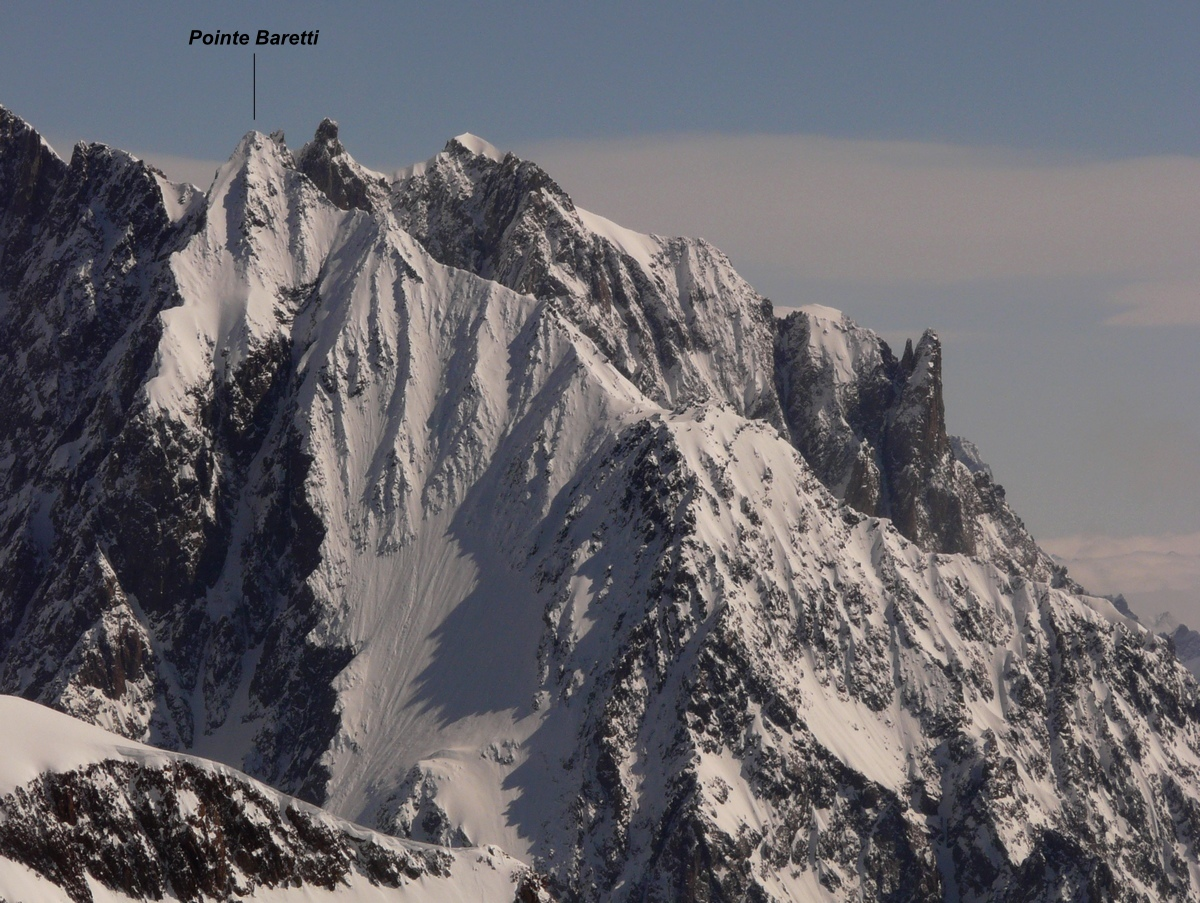
- The south-west face of Punta Baretti

Highest point
- Elevation: 4,013 m (13,166 ft)
- Coordinates: 45°48′52″N 06°51′48″E

Geography
- Location within Alps
- Location: Val d'Aosta, Italy
- Parent range: Mont Blanc massif

Climbing
- First ascent: 20 July 1880 by Martino Baretti and Jean-Joseph Maquignaz

Punta Baretti (French: Pointe Baretti) (4,013 m) is a mountain in the Mont Blanc Massif in the Val d'Aosta, Italy.

== See also ==
- List of 4000 metre peaks of the Alps
