= Ludwigshöhe (mountain) =

Mountain in Switzerland

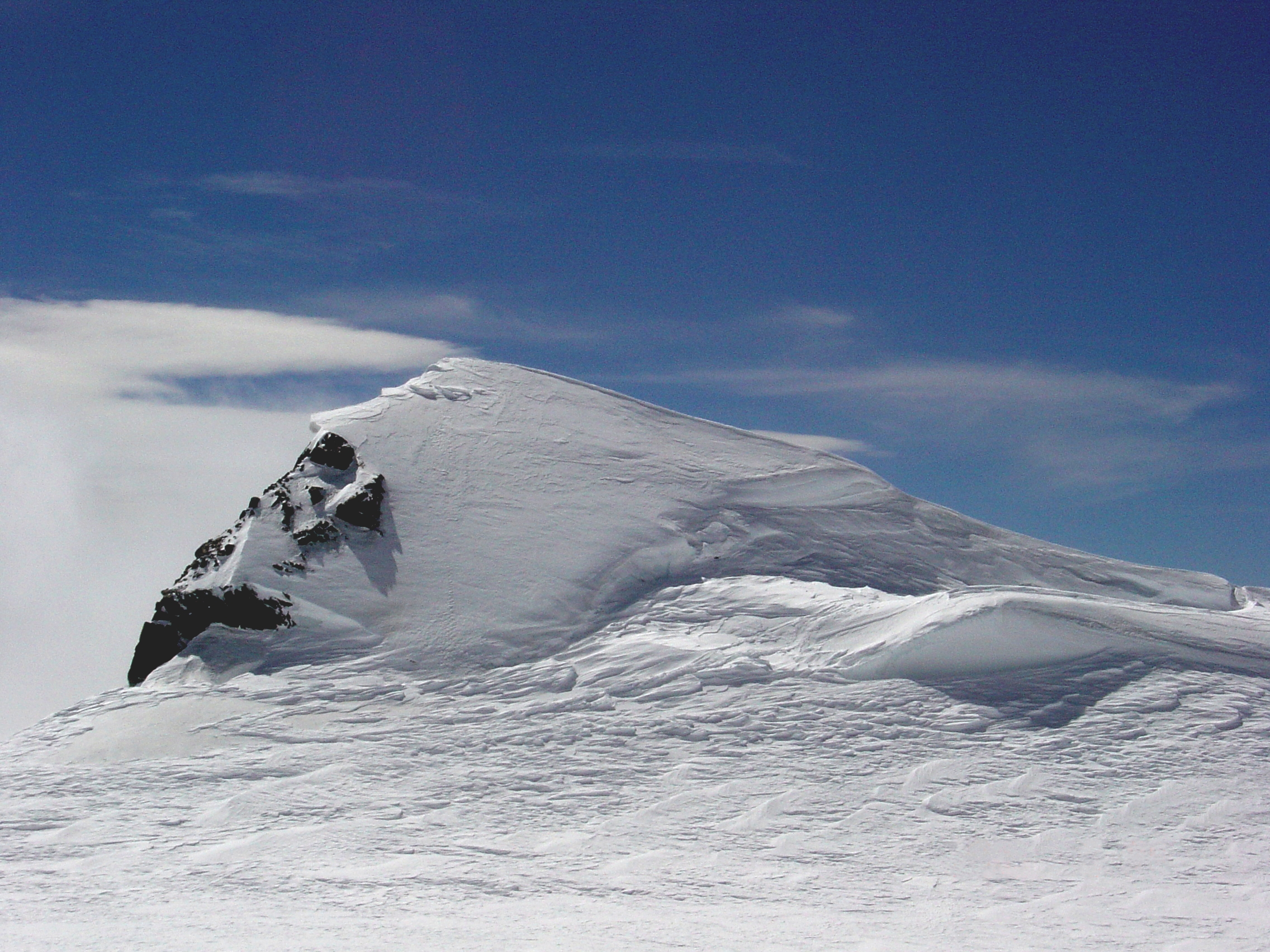
- Ludwigshöhe northern side

Highest point
- Elevation: 4,341 m (14,242 ft)
- Prominence: 57 m ↓ Fiodejoch
- Parent peak: Monte Rosa (Dufourspitze)
- Isolation: 0.7 km → Parrotspitze
- Coordinates: 45°55′02″N 7°51′44″E

Geography
- Location within Alps
- Location: Valais, Switzerland; Aosta Valley/Piedmont, Italy
- Parent range: Pennine Alps

The Ludwigshöhe is a mountain in the Pennine Alps on the Swiss-Italian border. It is situated near the Dufourspitze in the Monte Rosa Massif. The summit is the tripoint between Valais, Aosta Valley and Piedmont.

== See also ==
- List of 4000 metre peaks of the Alps
