= Täschhorn =

Mountain in Switzerland

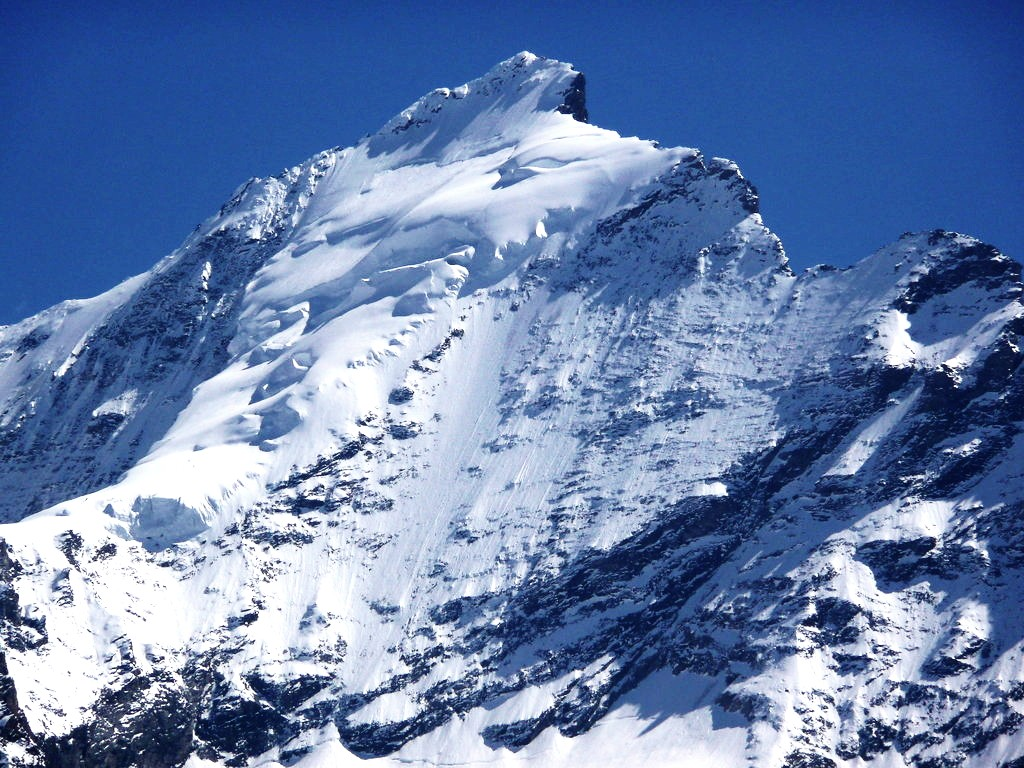
- West face of the Täschhorn

Highest point
- Elevation: 4,491 m (14,734 ft)
- Prominence: 213 m ↓ Domjoch
- Parent peak: Dom
- Isolation: 1.2 km → Dom
- Coordinates: 46°05′01″N 7°51′26″E

Geography
- Location within Switzerland
- Location: Valais, Switzerland
- Parent range: Pennine Alps

Climbing
- First ascent: 30 July 1862 by the Rev. John Llewelyn-Davies and Rev. J. W. Hayward with Stefan and Johann Zumtaugwald and Peter-Josef Summermatter
- Easiest route: SSE ridge at AD

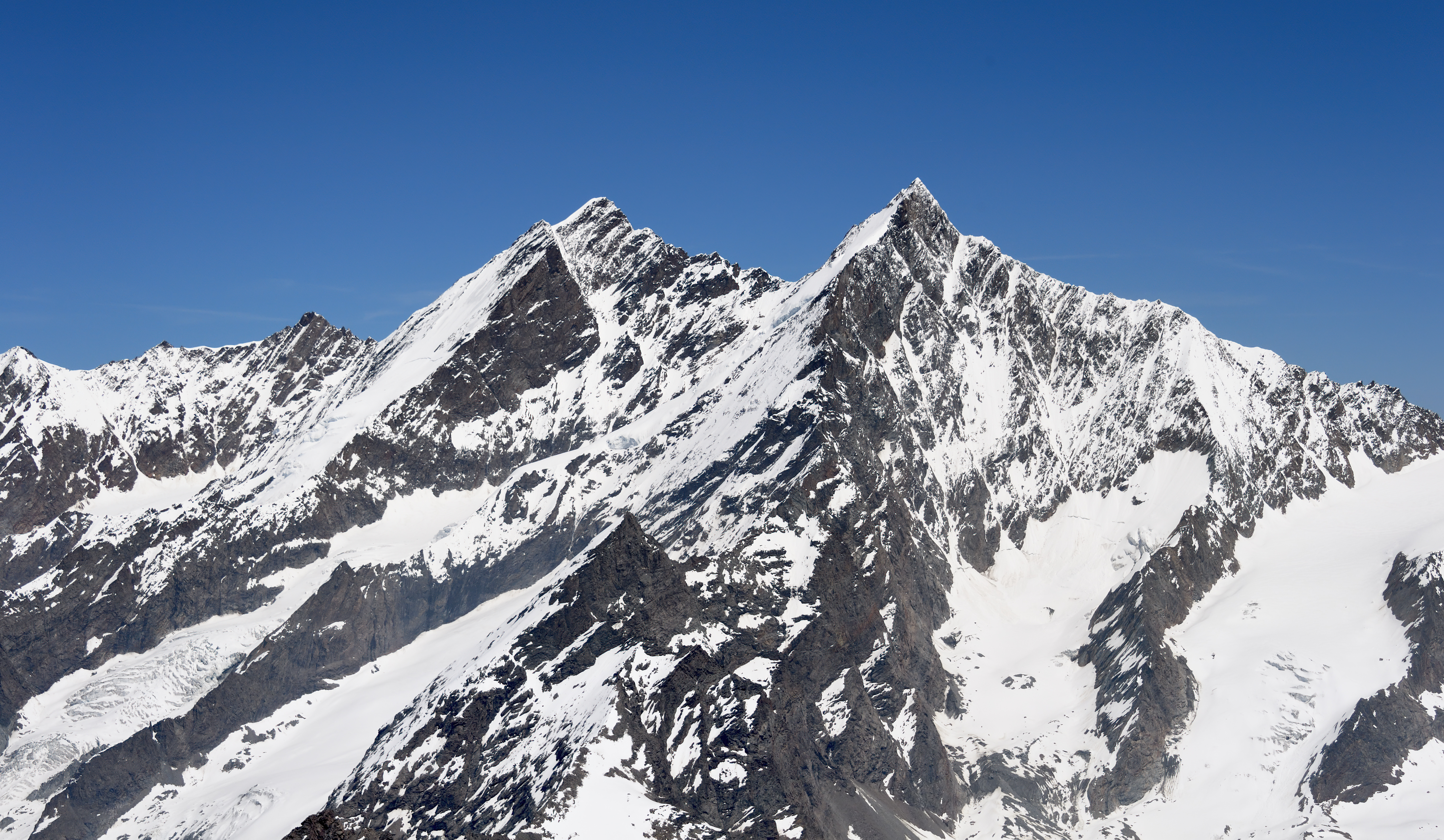
Dom (left) and Täschhorn (right) from the southwest

The Täschhorn (4,491 metres (14,734 ft)) is a mountain in the Pennine range of the Alps in Switzerland. There are no easy mountaineering routes to its summit, and it is regarded as being among the top ten 4,000-metre mountains in the Alps for difficulty, and "one of the highest, finest and least accessible 4000m mountains". It lies immediately north of the Alphubel, and south of the Dom within the Mischabel range, and is very similar in shape to the Dom when seen from the upper Zermatt valley.

== History ==
The first ascent of the mountain was by John Llewelyn Davies and J. W. Hayward with guides Stefan and Johann Zumtaugwald and Peter-Josef Summermatter on 30 July 1862. They climbed via the north-west (Kin Face) route, with a midnight start from the valley settlement of Randa.

== Climbing routes ==
=== Mischabelgrat (south-south-east-ridge) ===
The Täschhorn is normally climbed via its south-south-east ridge, known as the Mischabelgrat. The ascent route starts from the relatively innaccessible bivouac hut situated at its base on the Mischabeljoch. The route follows the exposed and often corniced crest of the ridge from the hut. It is graded AD and can take 4 to 5 hours to the summit. If not continuing to the Dom, descent from the Täschhorn's summit to the Mischabeljoch can take a further 3 1/2 to 4 hours.

The continuation route to the Dom (known as the Täschhorn–Dom traverse) has been described by alpine guide, Martin Moran, as a "magnificent traverse" and "one of the most demanding of the grandes courses in the Alps". With no easy way off, and because of its high altitude, the route can easily be affected by ice and snow in bad weather. In normal conditions, and in good weather, a climber can take between 4 and 6 hours to descend from the Täschhorn's summit to the Domjoch, and then to ascend the Dom's south ridge (Domgrat) to the latter's summit.

=== Kin Face (north-west face) ===
The Täschhorn can also be climbed via the obvious glacier tongue that descends from the summit on its north-west face (Kin Face). The route, graded AD+, is a classic expedition on snow and ice. Nevertheless, access to the route is not easy because of awkward terrain on the lower Kin Glacier. However, the installation of a via ferrata on the Kinfelsen ridge offers an alternative route and some security to climbers from the Kin Hut, and has nowadays replaced the long, traditional approach from the Dom Hut, which has become complicated and risky. The route should still only be attempted when there is good quality snow cover on the upper face.

=== South-west face ===
Climbed only very rarely, the ascent of the south west face is an extremely serious undertaking on broken mixed ground, and has been compared to the north face of the Matterhorn. It is graded TD+. It was first climbed on 11 August 1906 by the 19 year old guide, Franz Lochmatter and his brother Josef, together with their regular client, Valentine John Eustace Ryan. Also involved in the ascent party were Geoffrey Winthrop Young and Josef Knubel. Together, they faced many difficulties and number of falls on very committing and fragile, unprotectable mixed ground and very steep final rock pitch, and their efforts became one of the most 'epic adventures' in the history of Alpine mountaineering. It was not repeated until 37 years later. By the end of summer 1956, the face had only been climbed six times.

== See also ==
- List of Alpine four-thousanders
