= Aiguille du Jardin =

Mountain in Haute-Savoie, France

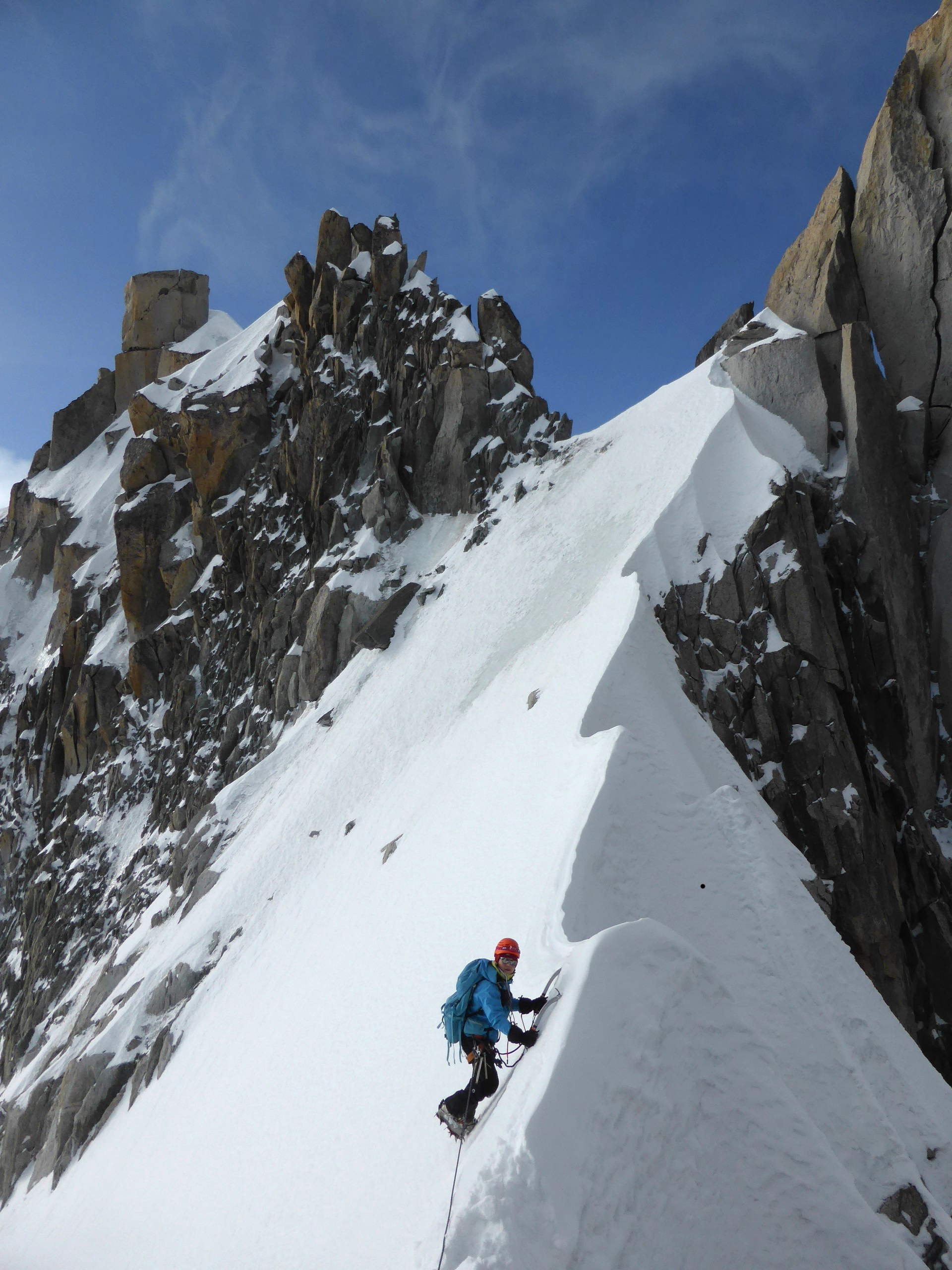
- Aiguille du Jardin - Crossing Aiguille du Jardin (4,035 m).- Grande Rocheuse (4,102 m) - Aiguille Verte (4,122 m)

Highest point
- Elevation: 4,035 m (13,238 ft)
- Coordinates: 45°56′02″N 06°58′33″E

Geography
- Location within France
- Location: Haute-Savoie, France
- Parent range: Mont Blanc Massif

The Aiguille du Jardin (4,035 m) is a summit on the east ridge of Aiguille Verte in the Mont Blanc massif in Haute-Savoie, France.

== Overview ==
The Aiguille du Jardin is considered one of the more challenging peaks among the 4,000-meter summits in the Mont Blanc massif. Its technical difficulty surpasses that of neighboring summits such as the Aiguille Verte and Les Droites. Despite its proximity to the Aiguille Verte, from some perspectives, the Aiguille du Jardin may appear as a subsidiary summit on its east ridge. However, as one approaches the Couvercle refuge from the Talèfre basin, the Aiguille du Jardin stands out as an independent and imposing peak. Its prominent south face is defended by steep buttresses of red granite, which remain largely unexplored, except perhaps by crystal hunters. The Aiguille du Jardin is often overshadowed by its more famous neighbors, but it offers a highly rewarding and less-traveled route for climbers seeking a serious challenge in the region.

== Climbing History ==
The first successful ascent of the Aiguille du Jardin (1 Aug 1904) was made by Émile Fontaine with guides Jean Ravanel and Léon Tournier, who traversed from the Grande Rocheuse along the Jardin ridge.

The first solo ascent was made in 1932 by the Austrian mountaineer Karl Blodig, who had previously climbed all the 4,000-meter peaks of the Alps. Blodig had attempted to reach the summit earlier, in 1931, but was forced to retreat due to a storm while climbing the Whymper Couloir with his son. In 1932, at the age of 72, Blodig returned to the peak. Unbeknownst to him, the Aiguille du Jardin had already been ascended just five days prior. Nevertheless, Blodig made the first solo ascent via the north-east couloir of the Col Armand Charlet. Despite the challenging conditions, including icy terrain and basic crampons, he successfully reached the summit and later described the experience as one of mixed emotions—both immense satisfaction and humility.

== Modern Ascents ==
More recently, new routes have been established on the Aiguille du Jardin. In 2018, climbers Will Sim and Ben Tibbetts made an ascent of the west pillar, a previously unexplored section of the mountain. Their route consisted of twelve pitches of granite grooves and strenuous cracks, eventually leading to mixed terrain toward the summit. This new line opened up a fresh challenge for modern climbers, further cementing the Aiguille du Jardin as a sought-after, but still relatively under-explored, peak in the Mont Blanc massif.

== See also ==
- List of 4000 metre peaks of the Alps
