= Rimpfischhorn =

Mountain in the Pennine Alps

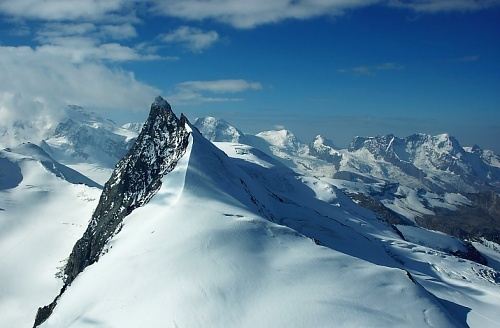
- The Rimpfischhorn from the Allalinhorn

Highest point
- Elevation: 4,199 m (13,776 ft)
- Prominence: 647 m (2,123 ft)
- Parent peak: Dom
- Coordinates: 46°01′23″N 7°53′02″E

Geography
- Location within Switzerland
- Location: Valais, Switzerland
- Parent range: Pennine Alps

Climbing
- First ascent: 9 September 1859 by Leslie Stephen and Robert Liveing with guides Melchior Anderegg and Johann Zumtaugwald
- Easiest route: Allalin glacier/north-west ridge (PD); a snow climb.

The Rimpfischhorn (4,199 m) is a mountain in the Pennine Alps of Switzerland. Along its north ridge lies the prominent sub-peak Grosser Gendarm (4107 m).

The first ascent of the mountain was by Leslie Stephen and Robert Living with guides Melchior Anderegg and Johann Zumtaugwald on 9 September 1859. Their route of ascent was from Fluh Alp via the Rimpfischwänge.

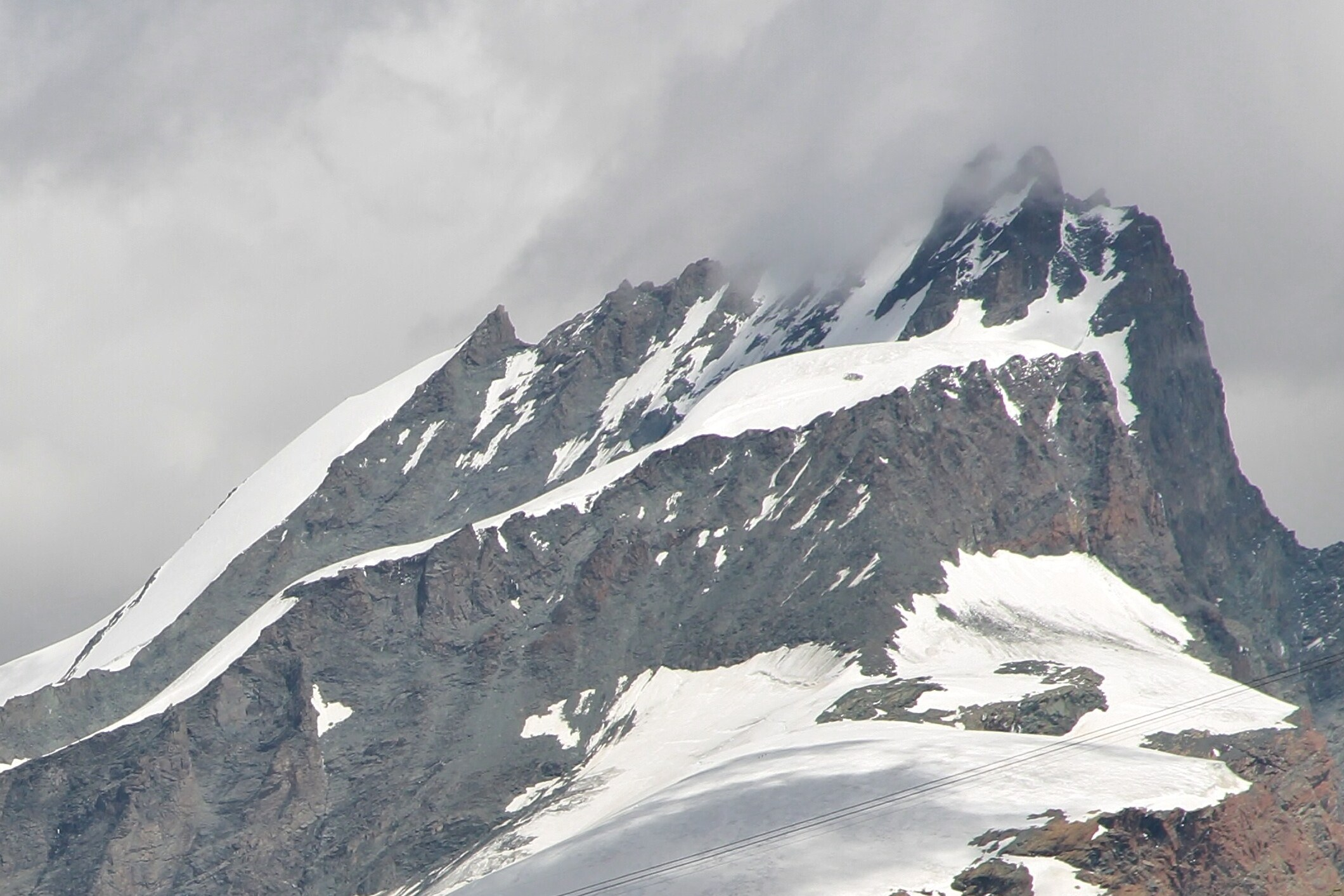
Rimpfischhorn from Gornergrat. The rock tower on the left is the summit Grosser Gendarm

== See also ==
- List of 4000 metre peaks of the Alps
