= Mont Brouillard =

Mountain in the Mont Blanc massif in the Val d'Aosta, Italy

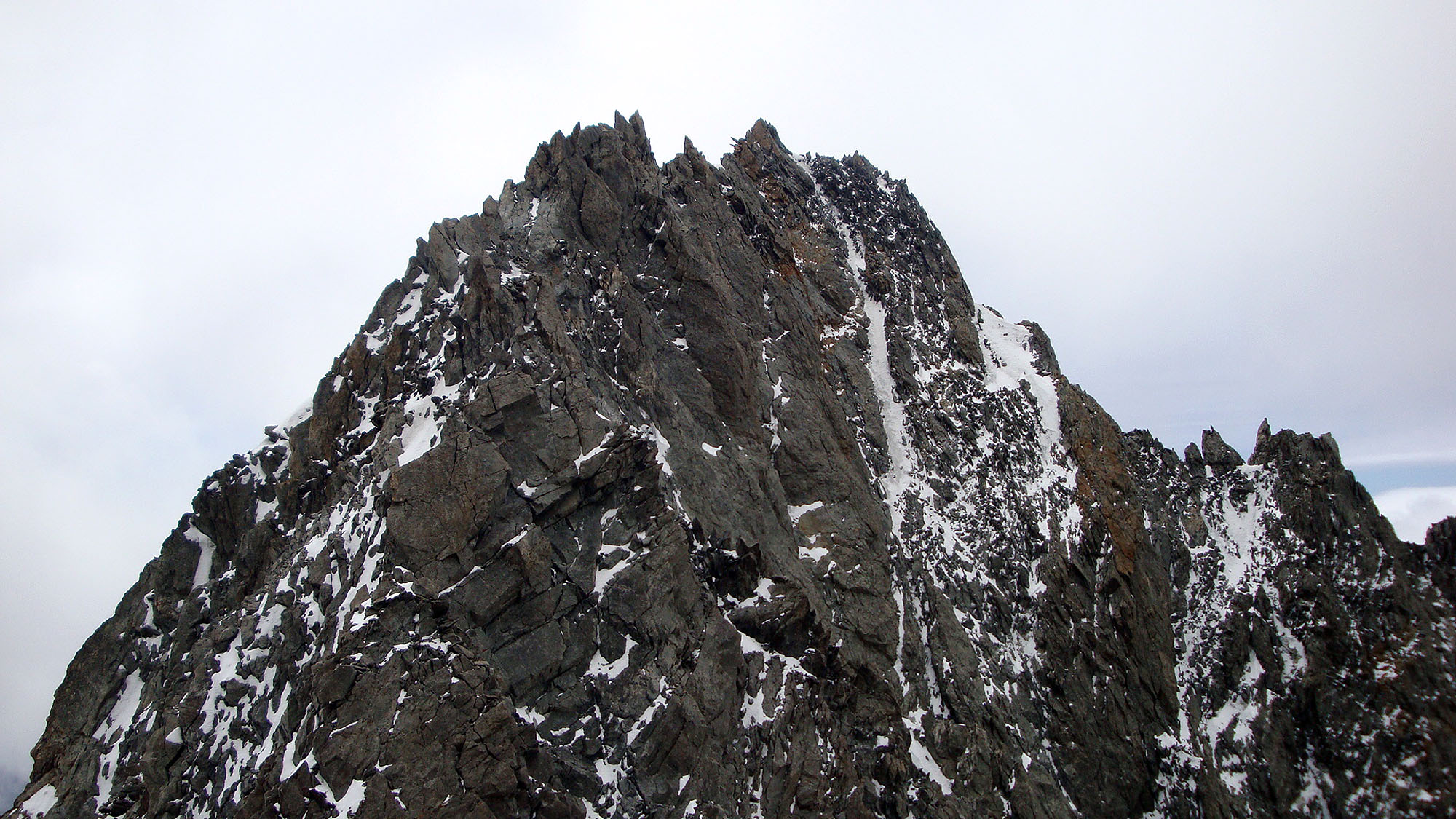
- Mont Brouillard seen from Col Émile Rey

Highest point
- Elevation: 4,069 m (13,350 ft)
- Coordinates: 45°49′03″N 06°51′54″E

Geography
- Location within Italy
- Location: Aosta Valley, Italy
- Parent range: Mont Blanc massif

Climbing
- First ascent: 10 July 1906 by Karl Blodig, Oscar Eckenstein and Alexander Brocherel
- Easiest route: South ridge and north ridge of Punta Baretti (PD)

Mont Brouillard (4,069 m) is a mountain in the Mont Blanc massif in the Val d'Aosta, Italy, being a satellite peak on the south ridge of Mont Blanc.

== Toponym ==
Though in French this name means "mountain of mist", this toponym comes from Valdôtain Francoprovençal patois. According to Aostan botanist and scientist Joseph-Marie Henry, the word Broillà means "made of breuils", Breuil meaning alpine marshy berm, as for Breuil in Valtournenche.

== Ascent ==
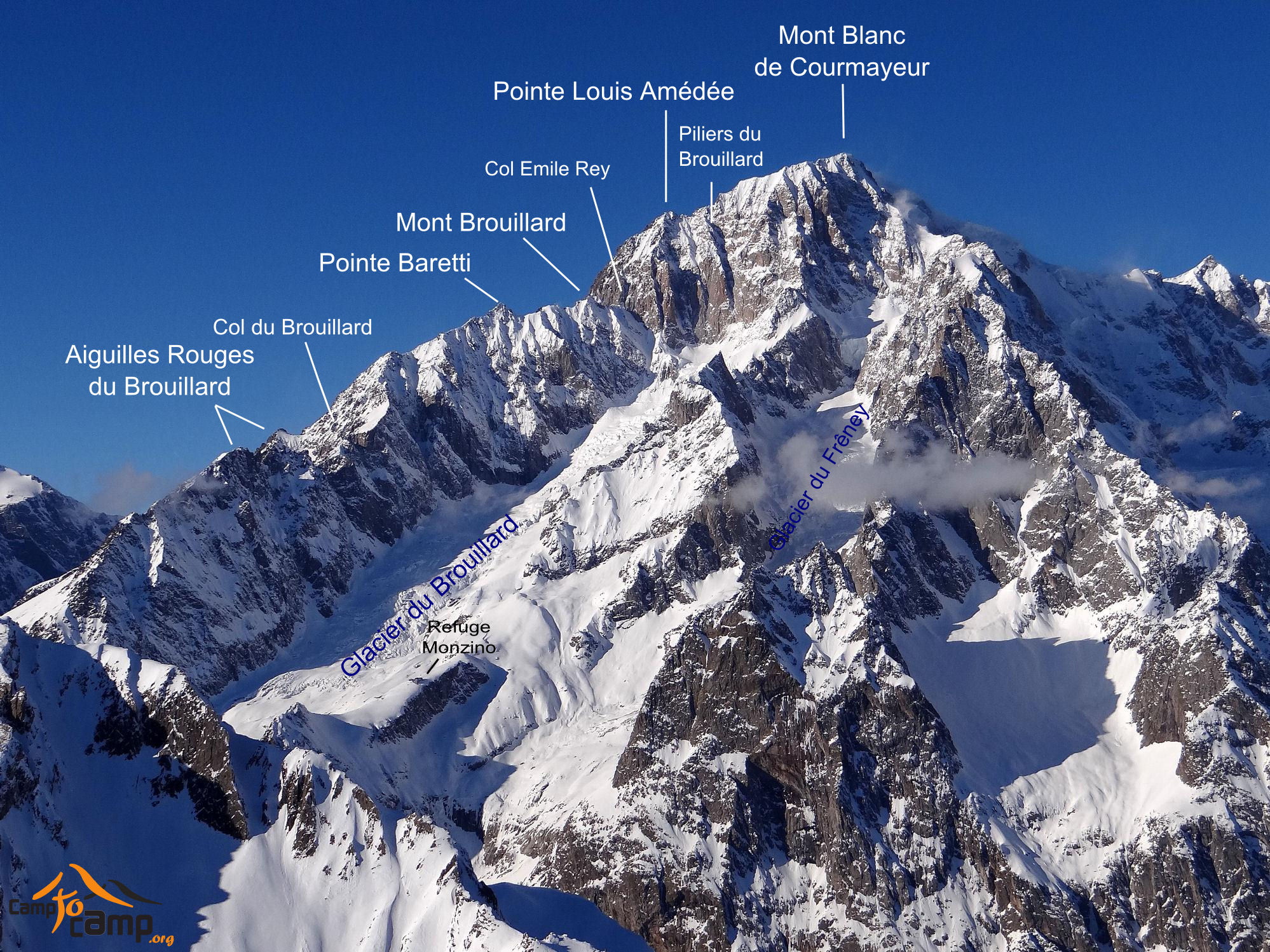
Significant topographic features on the Brouillard ridge

The question of who made the first ascent of the peak was for a time a matter of contention. Martino Baretti and his guide Jean-Joseph Maquignaz believed that they had climbed the peak, together with Punta Baretti, on 28 July 1880, but Karl Blodig showed that this was unlikely, no cairn being found when he made his ascent on 10 July 1906 with Oscar Eckenstein and Alexis Brocherel. Later research showed that the time that Baretti gave for the traverse between Punta Baretti and Mont Brouillard was "half that required".

The Brouillard ridge to the summit of Mont Blanc does not cross Mont Brouillard, being separated from the peak by the Col Emile Rey.
