= Mont Blanc de Courmayeur =

Point on the south-east ridge of Mont Blanc

- Monte Bianco di Courmayeur
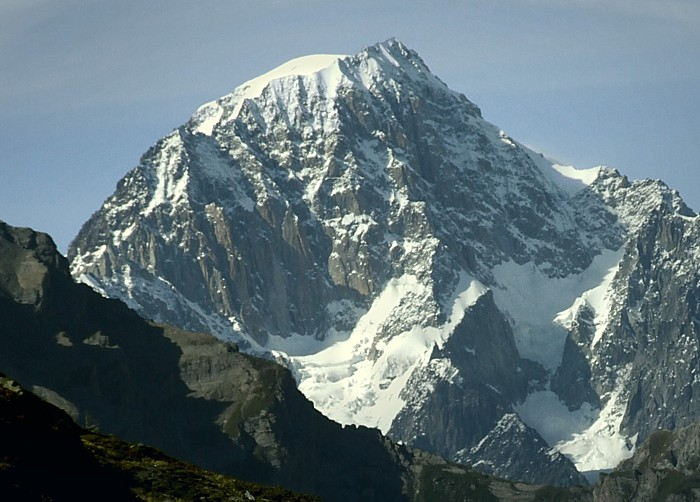
- Mont Blanc de Courmayeur seen from above La Thuile

Highest point
- Elevation: 4,748 m (15,577 ft)
- Prominence: 38 m (125 ft) ↓ Col Major
- Parent peak: Mont Blanc
- Isolation: 0.6 km → Mont Blanc to Mont Blanc
- Coordinates: 45°49′44″N 6°52′10″E

Geography
- Location within Alps Location within France Location within Italy
- Location: France / Italy
- Parent range: Graian Alps

Climbing
- First ascent: 18 August 1822 by Frederick Clissold with Joseph-Marie Couttet, David Couttet, Pierre-Marie Favret, Jacques Couttet, Jean-Baptiste Simond and Matthie Bosonney.

Mont Blanc de Courmayeur (French: [mɔ̃ blɑ̃ də kuʁmajœʁ]; Italian: Monte Bianco di Courmayeur) is a point (4,748 m (15,577 ft)) on the south-east ridge of Mont Blanc that forms the summit of the massive south-east face of the mountain. It is connected to Mont Blanc via the Col Major (c. 4,730 m (15,520 ft)).

Despite its minimal topographic prominence, Mont Blanc de Courmayeur appears as the second-highest peak in the Alps on the official list of Alpine four-thousanders of the Union Internationale des Associations d'Alpinisme (UIAA), owing to its impressive appearance and its importance for mountaineering.

The summit can be reached from the top of Mont Blanc over the Bosses ridge. The ascents over the Peuterey (to the south-east) and Brouillard ridges (to the south) are challenging.

The summit of Mont Blanc de Courmayeur is marked as lying entirely within Italy on the Italian Istituto Geografico Militare (IGM) map, while on the French Institut Géographique National (IGN) map the summit lies on the border between France and Italy. A demarcation agreement, signed on 7 March 1861, defines the local border between France and Italy. Currently this act and the attached maps (showing the border on the top of Mont Blanc, 4810 m) are legally valid for both the French and Italian governments.

== Huts ==
- Refuge Aiguille du Goûter (3,817 m)
- Bivacco Eccles (3,850 m)
- Rifugio Monzino (2,590 m)

== See also ==
- List of Alpine four-thousanders
