= Parrotspitze =

Mountain in Switzerland

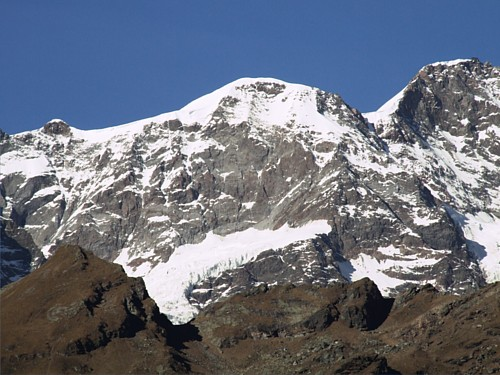
- The Parrotspitze, with the Signalkuppe (right)

Highest point
- Elevation: 4,434 m (14,547 ft)
- Prominence: 134 m ↓ Seserjoch
- Parent peak: Monte Rosa
- Isolation: 0.9 km → Signalkuppe
- Coordinates: 45°55′11″N 7°52′17″E

Geography
- Location within Alps
- Location: Aosta Valley, Italy / Valais, Switzerland
- Parent range: Pennine Alps

Climbing
- First ascent: 16 August 1863 by Reginald S. Macdonald, Florence Crauford Grove, Montagu Woodmass and William Edward Hall, with guides Melchior Anderegg and Peter Perren
- Easiest route: Glacier tour via west ridge

The Parrotspitze (in Italian, the Punta Parrot) (4,434 m) is a peak in the Pennine Alps of Italy and Switzerland. It is located south of Dufourspitze in the Monte Rosa Massif. The mountain is named after Johann Jakob Friedrich Wilhelm Parrot, a German doctor, who made an attempt on the Piramide Vincent with Joseph Zumstein in 1816.

The first ascent was made by Reginald S. Macdonald, Florence Crauford Grove, Montagu Woodmass and William Edward Hall with guides Melchior Anderegg and Peter Perren on 16 August 1863, four days after the same party's (with an extra guide) first ascent of the nearby Dent d'Hérens.

The previous year, on 8 July 1862, a party comprising A. W. Moore and Hereford Brooke George (the first editor of the Alpine Journal) with guides Christian Almer and Matthias Zumtaugwald climbed the east spur of the Parrotspitze (the British Route) but made straight over the frontier to Switzerland, not bothering to climb the final 60 metres to the summit.

== See also ==
- List of 4000 metre peaks of the Alps
