= Willo Welzenbach =

German mountaineer (1900–1934)

Wilhelm 'Willo' Welzenbach
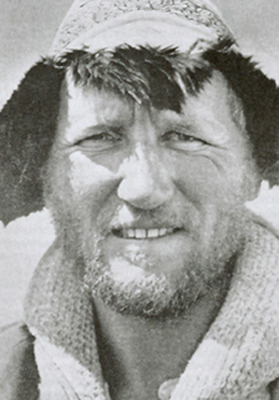
- Welzenbach on Nanga Parbat, 1934
- Born: Wilhelm Welzenbach; 10 November 1900; Munich, Germany
- Died: 12-13 July 1934 (at 33 years of age); Nanga Parbat, Pakistan
- Occupation: Civil Engineer
- Known for: 1934 expedition to Nanga Parbat; One of the pioneers of ice climbing; Grading systems in climbing

Wilhelm 'Willo' Welzenbach (10 November 1900 – 12 or 13 July 1934) was a German mountaineer and alpinist who died on Nanga Parbat while attempting the first ascent of the eight-thousander mountain. When he and Fritz Rigele made the first ascent of the north-west face of the Großes Wiesbachhorn in Austria, they were the first mountaineers to use ice-pegs for protection on an ice face. He went on to make the first ascent of several extreme ice faces in the Alps, and his career total exceeded one thousand successful summits in the region, including fifty peaks where he achieved the first ascent.

The American alpinist Jeff Lowe wrote in 1996 that "between the two world-wars Welzenbach distinguished himself as the best of a bold new generation of ice enthusiasts", over fifty years after his death, he was called the "father of modern ice climbing". Welzenbach also made important contributions to the development of grading systems in alpine climbing including the development of the "Welzenbach scale", which would become the important UIAA Scale (grades I–VI) that is still used today.

== Early and professional life ==
Welzenbach was born on 10 November 1900 in Munich. Whilst he was at secondary school his father was posted to Salzburg and from there he was soon making regular visits to the nearby Berchtesgaden Alps. He was conscripted in 1918 but the November armistice meant that he didn't see military action. He went on to study civil engineering at the Technische Hochschule Munich between 1920-1924. After a period working for the Deutsche Reichsbahn he was employed by Munich City Council as an engineer specialising in drainage works, an occupation which allowed him to afford a DKW sports-car and regular weekend trips to climb in Austria and Switzerland at a time when the German economy was struggling with post-war recovery.

Welzenbach later studied for a doctoral degree at the Karlsruhe Institute of Technology under the supervision of Wilhelm Paulcke, the pioneer of avalanche science. His research involved "major fundamental work on cornices", and he was awarded his doctorate in 1930 for a dissertation entitled "Untersuchungen über die Stratigraphie der Schneeablagerungen und die Mechanik der Schneebewegungen nebst Schlußfolgerungen auf die Methoden der Verbauung". (Note: The English title would be: "Investigations into the stratigraphy of snow deposits and the mechanics of snow movement including conclusions about processes of accumulation") Welzenbach's research had direct relevance to the challenges of protecting and securing alpine rail and road routes in winter. His dissertation continues to be cited into the 21st century and his work has been described as one of the "milestones in the field of snow and avalanches". Welzenbach and Paulcke followed this up by making one of the first films on avalanche awareness.

== Alpine mountaineering ==
Welzenbach began climbing in the Northern Limestone Alps in the 1920s and soon became an excellent rock climber and alpinist. He joined the Munich Academic Alpine Club in 1921 (within just a few years he became the club's president, for 1925–1926) and climbed with a number of club members who were much older, one in particular was Hans Pfann, 27 years his senior. In 1923, Pfann and Welzenbach made an early enchainment when over two days, with Eleonore Noll-Hasenclever, they climbed the Matterhorn's Zmutt Ridge, descended to the Savoia Hut (which has since been replaced by the Refuge Jean-Antoine Carrel) and then traversed the complete Frontier Ridge over the Dent d'Hérens before descending down the west ridge.

After the excursion on the Dent d'Hérens, Pfann introduced Welzenbach to Friedrich 'Fritz' Rigele (1878–1937), another experienced mountaineer who was a lawyer working near Salzburg and was also twice Welzenbach's age when they met. Within a few days of being introduced Welzenbach and Rigele traversed both the Pointe de Zinal and the Zinalrothorn in quick succession, over a 40 hour period, and it was whilst descending from the Zinalrothorn that Rigele told Welzenbach about the 'eishaken' he had developed and his ambition to make the first ascent of the north-west face of the Großes Wiesbachhorn. The 'eishaken' (translating literally as 'ice-hook'), were an adaptation of rock pitons which could be used on ice. They were made by a locksmith to Rigele's specification, c. 7.5-8 inches (19-20 cm) long with a rectangular cross-section and were the fore-runner to the modern ice screw. At that time there were few options for protection when ice-climbing and Rigele's 'eishaken' provided a solution.

Welzenbach later wrote to Rigele about the Wiesbachhorn and the following summer they teamed up to make the first ascent on 15 July 1924, with Rigele leading some of the crucial pitches. They were the first to use Rigele's new invention in earnest it was Welzenbach's first big success, and at the time "this was the most difficult ice course in the Eastern Alps".

The Wiesbachhorn climb "initiated a series of monumental north face climbs which carried his name far beyond the borders of Germany and established his alpine fame". He abandoned the traditional long handled ice axe in favour of a shorter ice-pick and made full use of Rigele's ice-pegs. Although the crampons that he was using had the traditional 8 point design, without front points (more modern 10 point crampons were not developed until 1932), with his state-of-the-art equipment he made the first-ascent of a series of important alpine climbing routes that involved large north faces across the Alps which previous generations of mountaineers had considered unjustifiable or unclimbable. Particularly significant successes included:

=== Dent d'Hérens north wall ===
The first ascent of the north wall of the Dent d'Hérens in the Valais Alps, together with Eugen Allwein in August 1925, opened "a new chapter in the history of mountaineering". Following their ascent, which took less than 16 hours, the climb "soon became a prestigious objective" for the most capable ice-climbers of their generation and was at the time "acknowledged as one of the most difficult ice faces in the Alps".

=== 1926 north faces in the Hohe Tauern ===
A series of first ascents in 1926 of north faces in the Hohe Tauern of the Eastern Alps with Karl Wien (who would later die on the same mountain as Welzenbach). These included the north-west face of the Glockerin on 1 September 1926, the north face of the Eiskogele on 3 September 1926 and the north face of the Grossglockner on 19 September 1926.

=== North face of the Grands Charmoz ===
In the Western Alps the first ascent of the north face of the Aiguille des Grands Charmoz in 1931 with Willy Merkl (who later died with Welzenbach on Nanga Parbat) was "a long and sustained epic in atrocious weather". The two climbers started on June 30, but after a night on the face they were caught out by bad weather and had to endure a second night out before they were able to descend. On 5 July, they returned to their previous high point and again became storm-bound high on the face, after enduring four days and nights in the storm they managed to reach the summit and then return to Montenvers, above Chamonix, where no one had expected them to survive the ordeal. By 1994, the Welzenbach route on the Charmoz was unclimbable in summer, having "been reduced to a sliver of ice high up on the face", little more than "a grotesque and suicidal heap of rubble".

=== North faces in the Bernese Oberland ===
In the 1930s Welzenbach and his parties "took the lion's share of almost all the high North face climbs" in the Bernese Alps. The campaign started in 1929 on the Grosses Fiescherhorn, Welzenbach and Heinz Tillmann climbed the north ridge in only 8.5 hours. When they returned the following year they started to ascend the mountain's north face, the Fiescherwand, on the morning of 5 September 1930, taking a line that ran directly to the summit. They reached the top that evening, after a 12-hour ascent.

He returned to the area in 1932 and tackled a "series of unsolved mountaineering challenges". The campaign started with the first ascent of the 1,200 m (3,900 ft) high north wall. of the Grosshorn which was climbed over the period 25-27 July with Alfred Drexel (who was to die on Nanga Parbat, on the same expedition that Welzenbach lost his own life), Hermann Rudy and Erich Schulze. The lower part of the Grosshorn north face is now seriously threatened by serac fall.

Then, towards the end of that summer, "in eight days of poor weather, he managed the first ascents of three dangerous and extremely difficult north walls" The first, on 7 September 1932 and again accompanied by Drexel and Schulze, was the north-east face of the Gspaltenhorn, one of the greatest faces in the Bernese Alps, with the summit 1,900 m (6,200 ft) above the valley floor and the vertical height of the face amounting to 1,650 m (5,410 ft). A few days later, over 9-10 September, the same party of Welzenbach, Drexel, Rudy and Schulze, made the first ascent of the north face of the Gletscherhorn. Soon after, on 14 September, he and Schulze made the first ascent of the north face of the Lauterbrunnen Breithorn.

=== Injury ===
His record is more remarkable by the fact that he was largely incapacitated for the period from the autumn of 1926, after his ascents in the Hohe Tauern, through to the summer of 1927 by a medical condition which primarily affected his right arm and which required a lengthy period of hospitalisation and surgery. Although he hadn't made a full recovery, and was restricted by a rigid right elbow which kept him away from long or difficult expeditions, he attempted to climb again in the summer of 1927. Despite his illness, and even with a stiffened elbow-joint, amongst his ascents in 1927 were the Gross Glockner by the Pallavicinirinne, and Mont Blanc by the Brenva Spur (with Karl Wien, Philipp Borchers and Erwin Schneider). By 1930, however, thanks to surgical skill, he had recovered much of his former power and the American alpinist Jeff Lowe wrote in 1996 that the "climbs that he undertook, such as the north faces of the Gross Fiescherhorn, the Aiguille des Grands Charmoz, the Gletscherhorn and the Lauterbrunnen Breithorn, remained, even into the 1960s, some of the most difficult in the Alps", all of the ascents listed by Lowe took place after Welzenbach's surgery.

== Death on Nanga Parbat ==
Welzenbach's first opportunity to climb in Asia arose when Willi Rickmer Rickmers invited him to join the German-Soviet Alay-Pamir Expedition which he was leading in 1928. He was unable to take part because of the problems with his arm.

Very soon after that invitation he threw himself into planning a climbing expedition to attempt the first ascent of the eight-thousanders, Nanga Parbat, in Pakistan. In 1930, the central committee of the DuOeAV had given their backing (and financial support) to the detailed plans he presented to them, he had obtained permission from the British Government who then administered the area and had obtained leave from his employers but his plans were blocked by the German Foreign Office in favour of the 1930 International Himalaya Expedition to Kangchenjunga led by Günter Dyhrenfurth. Two more attempts were also thwarted before they left Germany and it was not until 1934 that Welzenbach went to attempt Nanga Parbat and he was then not the expedition leader but the deputy-leader to Willy Merkl, one of his alpine climbing rope-partners. Germany's newly-established Nazi government provided significant financial support for the 1934 expedition as part of its drive to promote the supremacy of Germany over other countries.

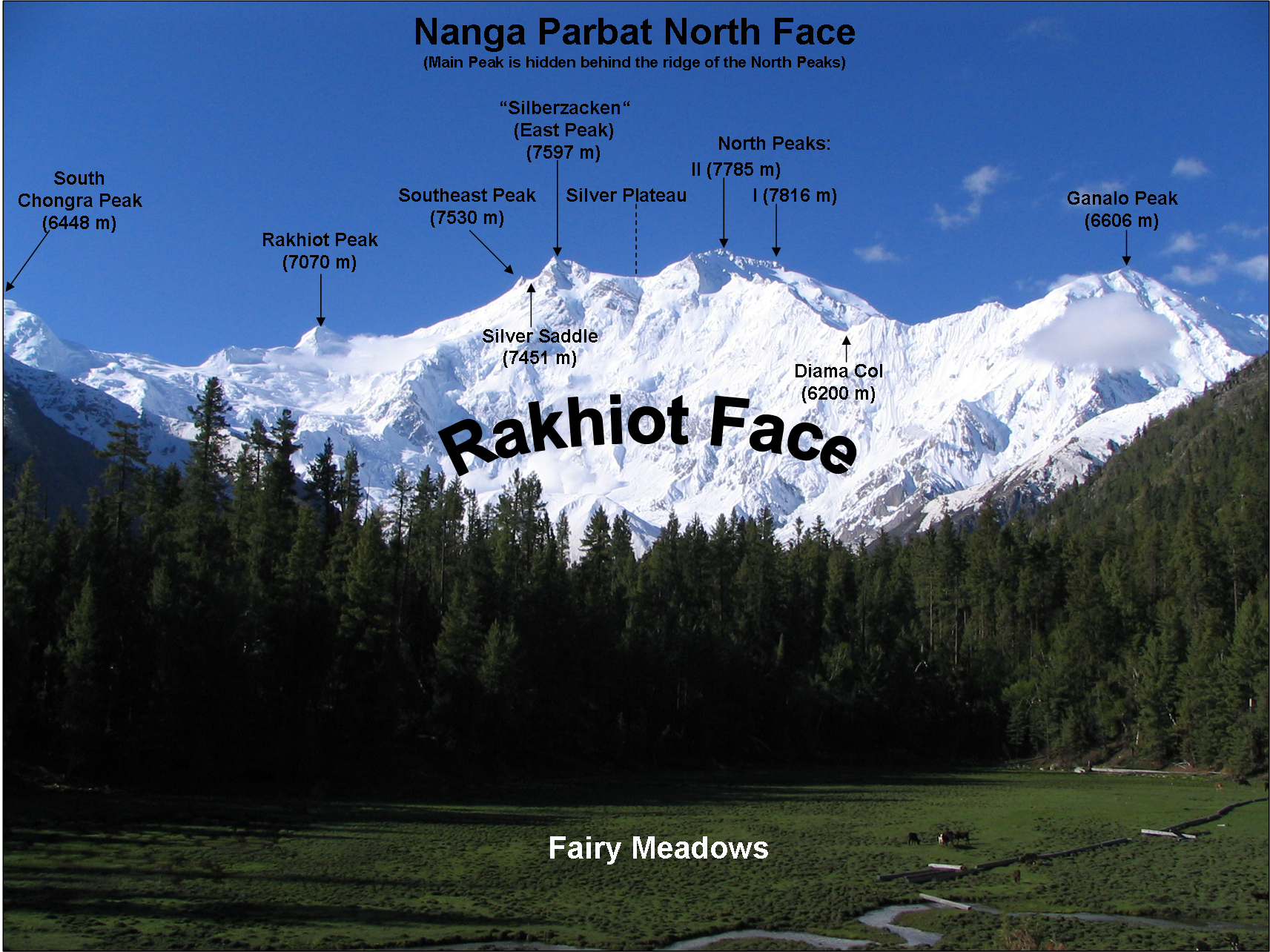
Diagram of the Rakhiot face of Nanga Parbat

The party were attempting an ascent via the Rakhiot face. They established a base camp a little above Fairy Meadows, at 3,967 m (13,015 ft) and the first attempt on the mountain was begun on 27 May. On 6 July, the team was at a good point to attempt the final stretch of the climb. However, Merkl wanted the entire team to arrive at the same time, so they waited a day, at 7,480 m (24,540 ft), so that the group could rest. The next day saw the arrival of monsoon weather which began with a snowstorm and blizzard lasting nine days. Sixteen Germans and porters were trapped as the ferocious storm raged. During the desperate retreat that followed, Welzenbach and two other German mountaineers, Ulrich Wieland and the expedition leader Willy Merkl, along with six Sherpas, died from the effects of exposure, exhaustion and altitude sickness. Several more suffered severe frostbite. Welzenbach died in the tent (at the Silver Saddle) sometime during the night of 12/13 July 1934.

Paul Bauer led a group of young German mountaineers to Nanga Parbat in 1938; they tried to recover the bodies of several of their unfortunate countrymen who were lost on the mountain during an expedition led by Karl Wien the previous year. Bauer's team found the body of Merkl along with a letter written by Welzenbach which was dated 10 July and signed by both Welzenbach and Merkl, in the letter they said that they had nothing hot to eat for six days and were also running out of water. Their deaths had been slow and extremely arduous, caused by extended exposure to the cold and starvation. (Note: The letter is reproduced on page 75)

Three of Welzenbach's climbing partners from the Alps also died on Nanga Parbat: Merkl, who was with Welzenbach when he died, Alfred Drexel who died earlier on the same expedition (at the time his death was attributed to pneumonia but in hindsight the cause is believed to have been pulmonary edema), and Wien who was to die in 1937, in an avalanche on another expedition to the same mountain.

== Nazi Party ==
Welzenbach, like many prominent mountaineers of his era, joined the Nazi Party. He was also a Scharführer in the Sturmabteilung, the Nazi paramilitary wing. Rigele, Welzenbach's early climbing partner who climbed sporadically with him from 1923 to 1930, (Note: Starting from their first meeting in 1923 when, within of few days of being introduced they traversed both the Pointe de Zinal and the Zinalrothorn in quick succession. On 15 July 1924, they made the ground-breaking first ascent of the north-west face of the Großes Wiesbachhorn. In August of that year they again met, in Zermatt, to attempt the Marinelli Couloir on the east face of Monte Rosa, the largest ice wall in the Alps (Rigele was not acclimatised and it was not until the following August that Welzenbach made that ascent, climbing with Alexander Matschunas). Even when Welzenbach was restricted by his arm they climbed together; returning in 1926 to the Zermatt area they climbed the south face of the Obergabelhorn and, on 1 August 1926, Welzenbach, Rigele and Fritz Bachschmidt made what they then believed to be the first ascent of a route up the north-west face of the Breithorn. In July 1930 Welzenbach, Wien and Rigele were back in the Western Alps where they went to the Leschaux Hut to reconnoitre a route on the then unclimbed north face of the Grandes Jorasses.) was a self-confessed anti-semite who in 1912 had married Olga, the sister of Hermann Göring. His funeral in 1937 was attended by Göring with a military honour guard. It is less clear whether Welzenbach's motivations for involvement in the early Nazi movement reflected a belief in the Nazi philosophy or were more a matter of convenience – during the period that he was a mountaineer it was difficult for a government employee to avoid joining state and party organizations and it was almost a prerequisite for participating in state-funded, high-profile expeditions, such as the 1934 Nanga Parbat expedition. Some light is shed on that question by Bauer's comments to the National Socialist sports official Hans von Tschammer und Osten after Welzenbach's death. Bauer wrote that "In 1923 Adolf Hitler was already, for us, the man we would not see touched. In contrast Welzenbach belonged to the Bavarian People's Party and stood with a few of his kind in opposition."

== Legacy ==
His name was attached to Pointe Welzenbach, 3,355 m (11,007 ft), on the south ridge of the Aiguille Noire de Peutérey in the Mont Blanc massif in the 1930s to mark the high point reached by Welzenbach and Eugen Allwein when they were making an early attempt on the Peutérey Noire South Ridge on 24 July 1926.

Within a few months of Welzenbach's death a street in Munich, Welzenbachstraße, was named after him.

Several features on the Rupal face of Nanga Parbat now bear the names of the German mountaineers who lost their lives on the other side of the mountain in 1934. In the middle parts of face these include the Welzenbach Icefield, Welzenbach Couloir and Welzenbach Spur. Those names, along with the Merkl Icefield, Merkl Gully, Merkl Notch (near the top of the face), Wieland Glacier and Wieland icewall (near the foot of the face), were coined by Herrligkoffer (who led several expeditions to Nanga Parbat from 1953-1982 and was Merkl's half-brother) before the party of German mountaineers he led in 1964 had reached the mountain and the names now feature in many reports of mountaineering attempts on the Rupal side of the mountain. (Note: These features are labelled on the photograph of the Rupal Face.)

In 1923 Welzenbach refined the system used in the Alps for grading climbs. One of the new features he introduced was a sixth grade of difficulty, that grading system bears his name and was adopted by the UIAA in 1967, it has since become the universally accepted grading system for alpine climbs.

Among his many first ascents across the Alps were at least seventeen new rock climbs in the Wetterstein Alps whilst he was carrying out fieldwork in the area in 1925 for a new climbing guidebook he authored. A book containing Welzenbach's original accounts of all of his ascents across the Alps and the Himalayas has also been published.
