= Tête de Milon =

Mountain in Switzerland

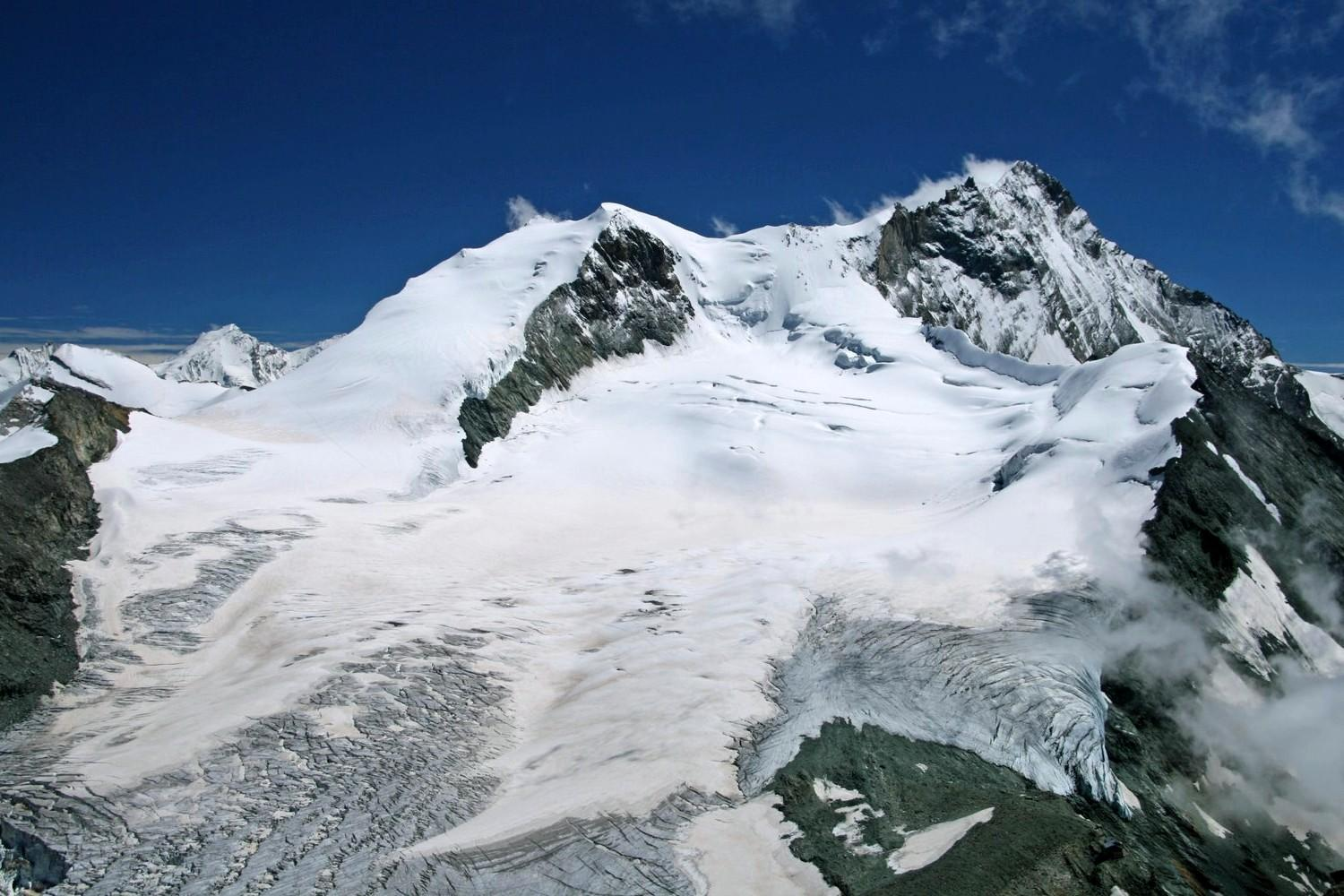
- The Weisshorn with Tête de Milon on the far-right

Highest point
- Elevation: 3,693 m (12,116 ft)
- Prominence: 43 m (141 ft)
- Parent peak: Weisshorn
- Coordinates: 46°7′6.7″N 7°41′28.5″E

Geography
- Location within Switzerland
- Location: Valais, Switzerland
- Parent range: Pennine Alps

Tête de Milon (3,693 m) is a mountain of the Swiss Pennine Alps, located east of Zinal in the canton of Valais. It belongs to the massif of the Weisshorn and lies west of the Turtmann Glacier.

The Cabane de Tracuit, a mountain hut owned by the Swiss Alpine Club, is located north of the mountain at a height of 3,256 metres.
