= Eleonore Noll-Hasenclever =

German alpinist (1880–1925)

- Born: Eleonore Hasenclever; August 18, 1880; Duisburg, Kingdom of Prussia
- Died: August 18, 1925 (aged 45); Bishorn, Pennine Alps, Switzerland
- Known for: Mountain climbing

Eleonore Noll-Hasenclever (4 August 1880 – 18 August 1925) was a German alpinist who mainly climbed in the Swiss Alps. During her lifetime, she climbed more than 150 summits of 12,000 feet or above. In 1925, she died in an avalanche on her descent of the Bishorn.

== Biography ==
Eleonore Hasenclever was born on 4 August 1880 in Duisburg, Kingdom of Prussia. She grew up in Frankfurt before attending an all-girls boarding school near Lake Geneva. Her interest in mountains was kindled during a school trip to Valais, and she subsequently climbed with Alexander Burgener, a well-known mountain guide. Together, she and Burgener climbed 21 4,000-metre peaks.

In 1911, Noll-Hasenclever was part of the first guideless ascent of the Aiguille du Dru. On 27 July of that year, she and Max Helff, Günter von Saar, Helene Wirthl, and Richard Witzenböck were the first to ascend the Tricot ridge of the Aiguille de Bionnassay.

In 1919, she descended Monte Rosa after reaching its summit, becoming the first woman to climb its east face. In 1923, Noll-Hasenclever, Hans Pfann, and Willo Welzenbach made the first two-day climb of the Matterhorn and the Dent d'Hérens. She climbed the Matterhorn eight times, as well as Mont Blanc multiple times.

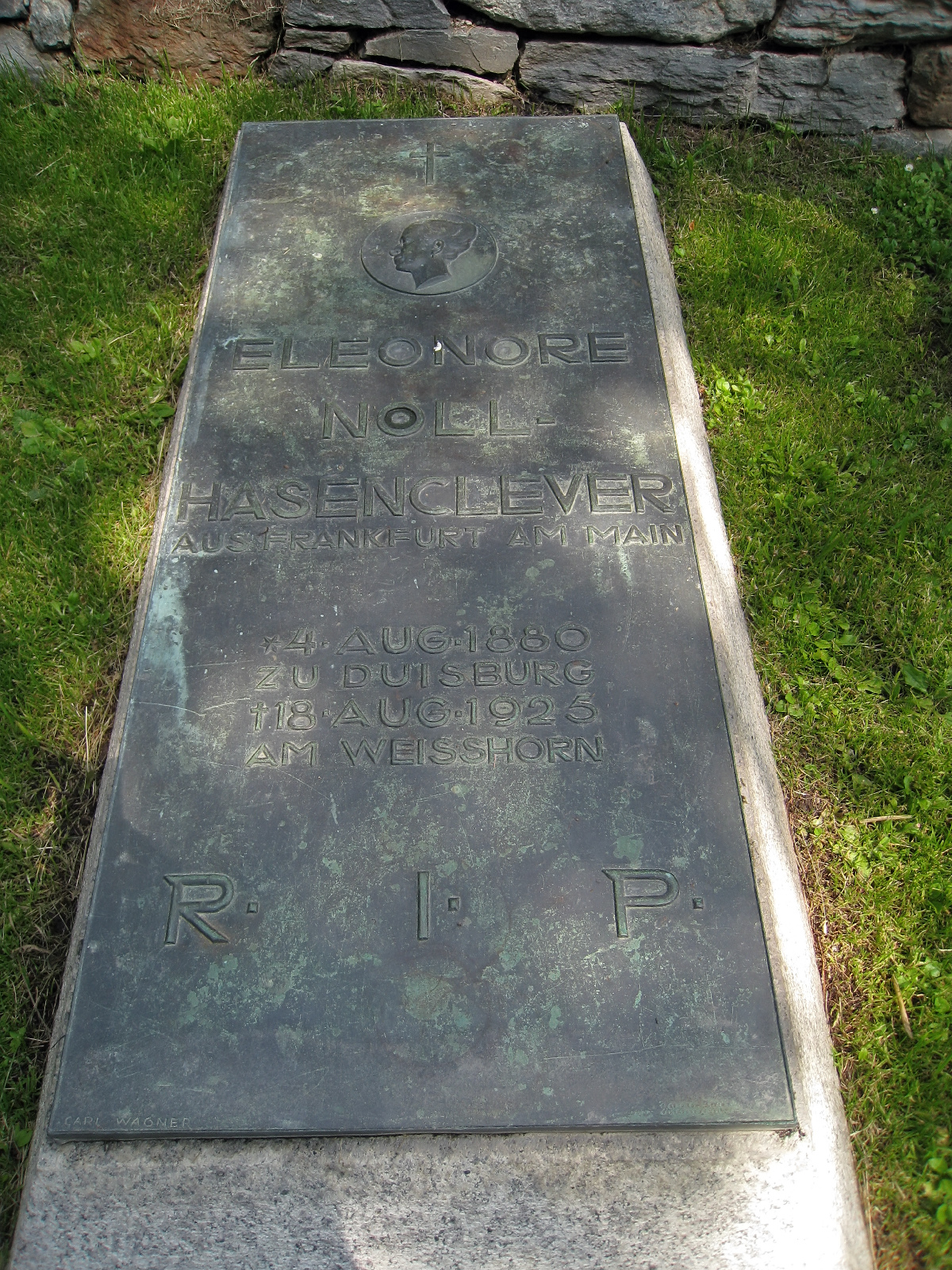
Noll-Hasenclever's grave in the Mountaineer's Cemetery, Zermatt

On 18 August 1925, Noll-Hasenclever, Hans Pfann, and Hermann Trier climbed the Weisshorn, and during their descent of the nearby Bishorn, an avalanche swept over them and carried them down to the Bies Glacier, trapping Noll-Hasenclever and Pfann. Trier attempted to dig out Noll-Hasenclever, but she died. The next day, Pfann was saved and Noll-Hasenclever's body was recovered from the snow. She was buried in Zermatt in a section of the graveyard known as the "Mountaineers' Cemetery", which mainly holds people who died climbing local peaks.

== Personal life ==
Eleonore Hasenclever married mountaineer Johannes Noll in 1914. They owned an estate together near Frankfurt.
