= Turtmann Glacier =

Glacier in Switzerland

- Turtmanngletscher
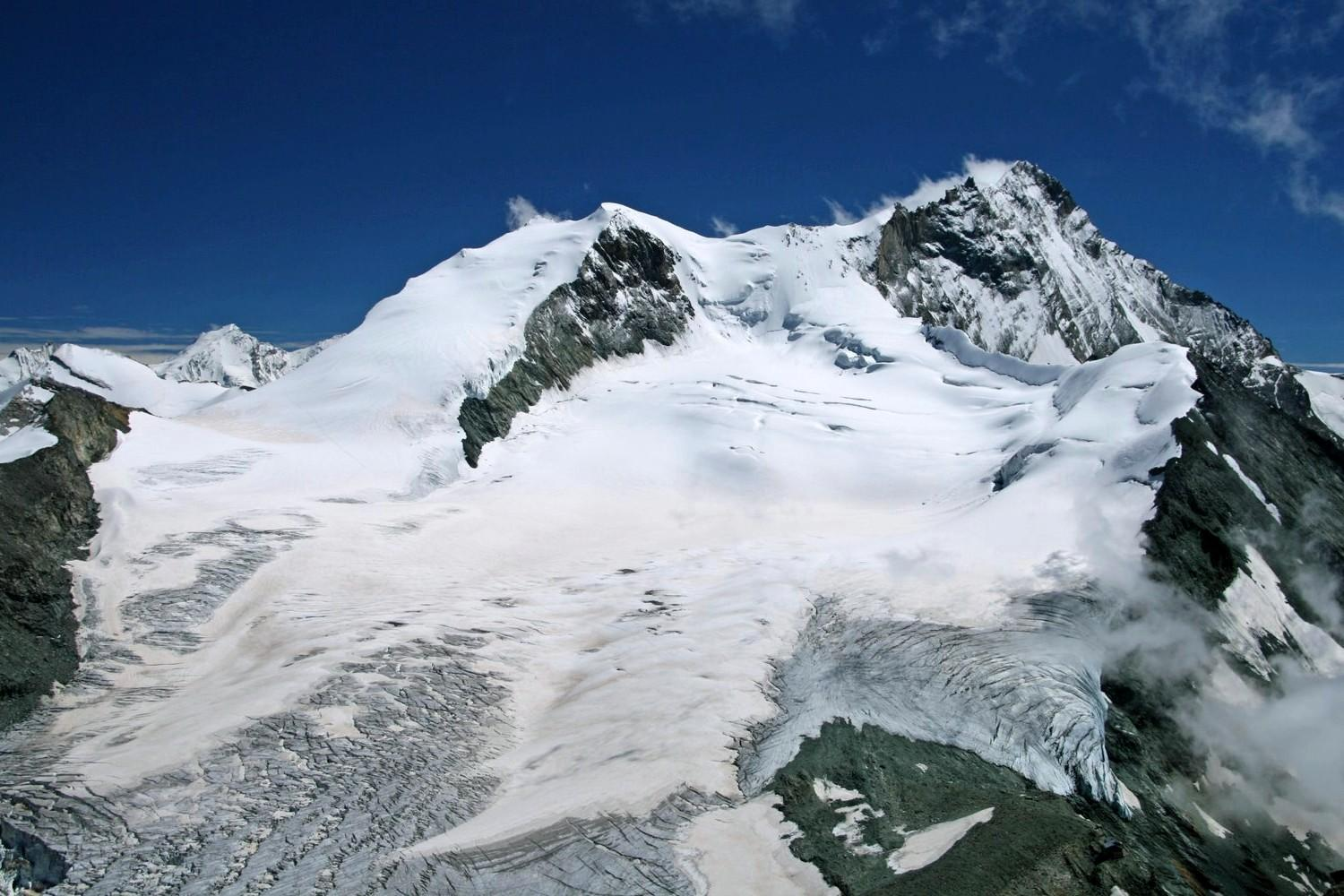
- Upper basin of the glacier
- Interactive map of Turtmann Glacier
- Location: Valais, Switzerland
- Coordinates: 46°8′0″N 7°41′14″E
- Length: 5 km

The Turtmann Glacier (German: Turtmanngletscher) is a 5 km long glacier (2005) situated in the Pennine Alps in the canton of Valais in Switzerland. In 1973 it had an area of 5.91 km^{2}. The glacier is located north of Bishorn and Weisshorn.

On an altitude of 3256m, at the western border of the glacier, lies the Tracuit Hut (French: Cabane de Tracuit). This hut, run by the Swiss Alpine Club (SAC), is a starting point for the ascent to the Bishorn, the Weisshorn and Les Diablons.

== See also ==
- List of glaciers in Switzerland
- Swiss Alps
- Turtmannsee
