= German-Soviet Alay-Pamir Expedition =

Research expedition in 1928

The German-Soviet Alay-Pamir Expedition (also known as the German-Russian Alay-Pamir Expedition) was undertaken in 1928 by the Academy of Sciences of the USSR and the Emergency Association of German Science. Along with the scientists, four mountaineers from the German and Austrian Alpine Club also participated. The five-month-long expedition to the Alay Valley and the Trans-Alay Range in Pamir was under the direction of Nikolai Petrovich Gorbunov and the organizational leadership of Willi Rickmer Rickmers. The deputy expedition leader was the geodesist and cartographer Richard Finsterwalder.

== Research work ==
The Soviet participants were responsible for mineralogy, petrography and geodetic/astronomical research, while the Germans were responsible for geology, surveying, mapping, glaciology and linguistics.

About 400 photogrammetric images were taken to map the region. The Fedchenko Glacier was also measured for the first time, which is the longest glacier outside of the polar regions.

== Mountaineering ==
On 25 September 1928, Karl Wien, Eugen Allwein and Erwin Schneider made the first ascent of the 7,134 m (23,406 ft.) high Mount Kaufmann (now Lenin Peak), which was at the time the highest climbed peak in the world.

== Participants ==
The German and Soviet sides each contributed eleven expedition members. Including servants, porters, and translators, the expedition totalled 65 men, 160 horses, and 60 camels.

- Soviet:
  Belayev (astronomer), I. G. Dorofeyev (topographer), Nikolai Gorbunov (overall leader), K. W. Isakov (geodesist), Nikolai Korzhenevsky (geographer), Alexander Nikolayevich Labunzov (mineralogist), Michalkov (geophysicist), Reichardt and Sokolov (zoologists), Dmitrii Ivanovich Zcherbakov (geologist and leader), R. R. Zimmermann (meteorologist) and as visitors Otto Schmidt, Nikolai Krylenko, Yelena Rosmirovich (the wife of Krylenko) and Dr. Rossels.
- German:
  Eugen Allwein (doctor and mountaineer), Hans Biersack (topographer), Philipp Borchers (mountaineer), Richard Finsterwalder (photogrammetrist), Franz Kohlhaupt (doctor and mountaineer), Wolfgang Lentz (linguist), Ludwig Nöth (geologist), William Frederick Reinig (zoologist), Willi Rickmer Rickmers (leader), Erwin Schneider (mountaineer), Karl Wien (student of physics and mountaineer).

== Literature ==
- Willi Rickmer Rickmers: Alai! Alai! Arbeiten und Erlebnisse einer deutsch-russischen Alai-Pamir-Expedition. Brockhaus-Verlag, Leipzig 1930.
- Heinrich von Ficker (ed.): Wissenschaftlichen Ergebnisse der Alai-Pamir Expedition, 1928. 6 vols., Reimer, Berlin 1932.
- Tagebuchaufzeichnungen von Karl Wien
- Die Pamir-Expedition 1928
- Walter Schmidkunz: Die Alai-Pamir-Expedition. In: Mitteilungen des Deutschen und Österreichischen Alpenvereins, vol. 54 (10), 1928, pp. 175–180. Digitized (PDF, 40 MB)
- Berichte zur Expedition von Rickmers, Borchers/Wien und Finsterwalder. In: Zeitschrift des Deutschen und Österreichischen Alpenvereins, Vol. 60, 1929, pp. 59–160. Digitized
- Die Alai-(Pamir-)Expedition 1928 (= Deutsche Forschung – Aus der Arbeit der Notgemeinschaft der Deutschen Wissenschaft, Vol. 10). Siegismund, Berlin 1929.
- Die Alai-Pamir-Expedition (1928) als internationale Kulturpolitik. In: Franziska Torma: Turkestan-Expeditionen – Zur Kulturgeschichte deutscher Forschungsreisen nach Mittelasien (1890-1930). Transcript, Bielefeld 2011, originally a thesis at Univ. Munich, ISBN 978-3-8376-1449-7, pp. 181–189.
