= Hanns-Peter Schmidt =

German Indologist and Iranologist

Hanns Peter-Schmidt
- Born: 1930; Berlin, Germany
- Died: 31 March 2017 (aged 86–87); Dana Point, California

Academic background
- Education: University of Hamburg
- Thesis: Vedisch vratá und awestisch urvāta (1957)
- Doctoral advisor: Ludwig Alsdorf
- Influences: Wolfgang Lentz

Academic work
- Discipline: Indology; Iranology
- Institutions: University of California, Los Angeles
- Main interests: Gathas; Vedas

Hanns-Peter Schmidt (1930 – 31 March 2017) was a German Indologist and Iranologist who was Professor of Indo-Iranian Studies at the University of California, Los Angeles. He specialized in the comparative study of the Gathas and Vedas.

== Biography ==
Hanns-Peter Schmidt was born in Berlin, Germany in 1930. He studied at the University of Hamburg under the direction of Indologist Ludwig Alsdorf, who was a close associate of many prominent scholars, including Christian Bartholomae, Heinrich Zimmer and Heinrich Lüders. Schmidt also studied Middle Iranian with Olaf Hansen (1902–69), and took courses with Franz Altheim. It was however his friend and teacher Wolfgang Lentz, Professor of Iranian at the University of Hamburg, who was to have the greatest influence on him. Schmidt received his PhD in Indo-Iranian Studies in at the University of Hamburg in 1957. His dissertation, Vedisch vratá und awestisch urvāta (1958), systematically compared the Indo-Iranian term for "vow" in the Vedas and the Avesta.

A research fellow at Deccan College, Poona from 1959 to 1961, Schmidt taught at the University of Saugor from 1961 to 1964. From 1965 to 1967 he was an assistant professor at the University of Tübingen. In 1965, Schmidt was appointed Professor of Indo-Iranian Studies at the University of California, Los Angeles (UCLA). He was a visiting professor in Sanskrit and Old Iranian and Middle Iranian at the University of Leiden from 1974 to 1976. Schmidt retired as Professor Emeritus from UCLA in 2000.

Schmidt specialized in the study of the Vedas and the Gathas of Zoroaster, as well as Vedic mythology and the Zoroastrianism. He was particularly interested in the composition of the Gathas, in the study of the animal world in both Zoroastrianism and the Indian tradition, and the study of the Indo-Iranian god Mithra. He made major contributions on these subjects.

Schmidt died in Dana Point, California, on 31 July 2017.

== See also ==
- Stig Wikander
- Geo Widengren
- Michael Witzel

== Selected works ==
- Vedisch vratá und awestisch urvāta, 1958
- Zarathustra’s Religion and His Pastoral Imagery, 1975

== Sources ==
- Daryaee, Touraj; Duchesne-Guillemin, Jacques (13 September 2017). "SCHMIDT, HANNS-PETER". Encyclopædia Iranica.
