= Großes Wiesbachhorn =

Mountain in the federal state of Salzburg, Austria

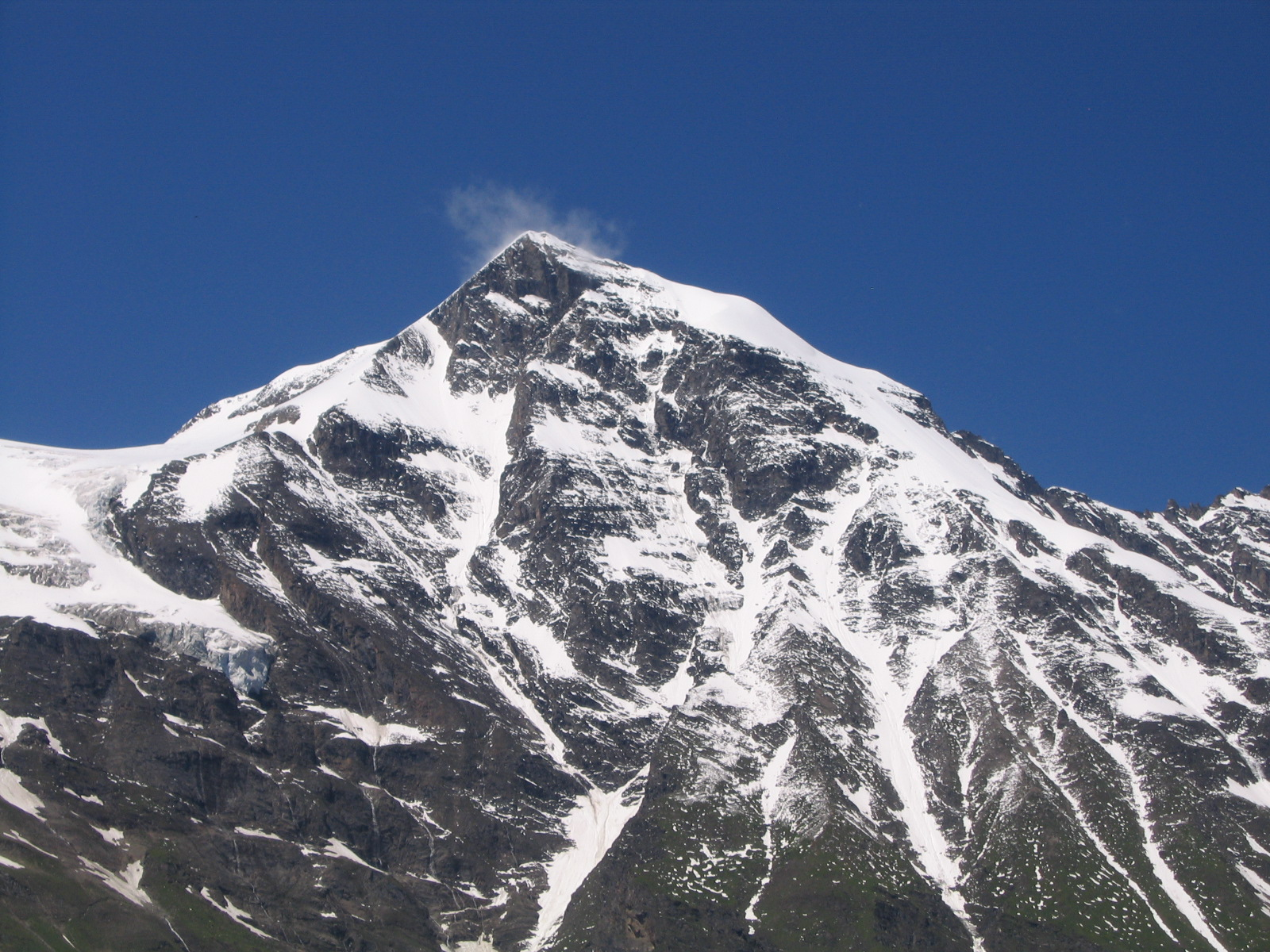
- The Großes Wiesbachhorn seen from the start of the Großglockner Alpine Road

Highest point
- Elevation: 3,564 m (11,693 ft)
- Prominence: 450 m (1,480 ft)
- Listing: Alpine mountains above 3000 m
- Coordinates: 47°9′25″N 12°45′18″E

Geography
- Location: Salzburg, Austria
- Parent range: Hohe Tauern

Climbing
- First ascent: In the 18th century by two farmers from Fusch called Zanker and Zorner
- Easiest route: Over the northwest ridge (Kaindlgrat, I, Firnschneide 35°)

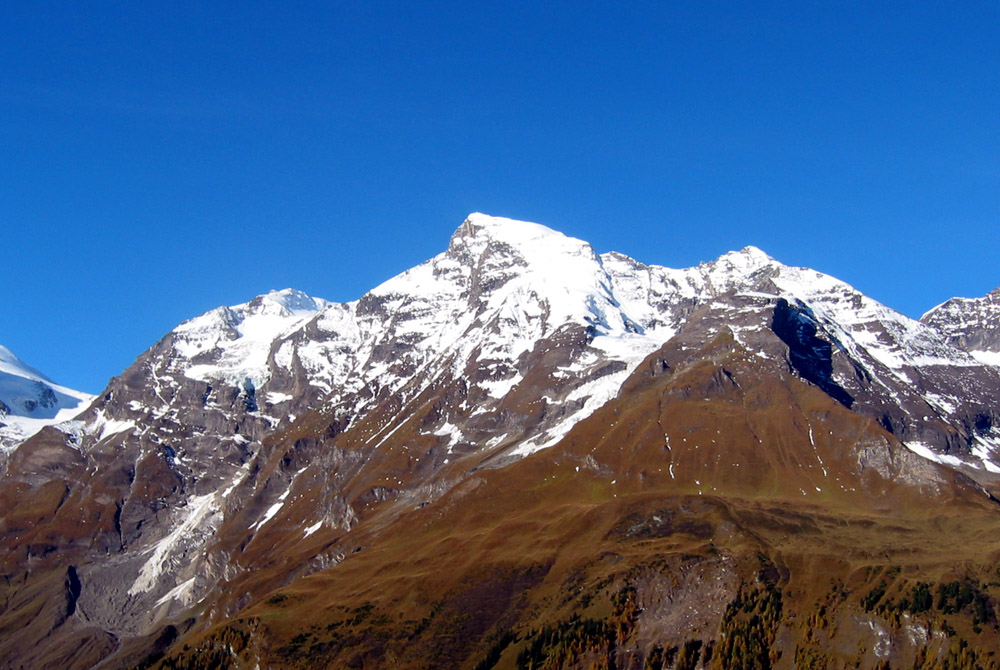
The Große Wiesbachhorn seen from the Fusch side

The Großes Wiesbachhorn (German pronunciation: [ˈɡʁoːsəs ˈviːsbaxˌhɔʁn]) is a mountain in the federal state of Salzburg, Austria and, at 3,564 m above sea level (AA) (according to other sources 3,570 m above sea level (AA)), is the third-highest peak of the Hohe Tauern range.

Its entirely free-standing firn-capped summit forms the main peak of the Fusch/Kaprun chain and is often viewed in Alpine literature as a rival of the Großglockner. The great slope on its eastern and southeastern side plunges about 2,300 metres to the Fuscher Ache - one of the greatest height differences between mountaintop and valley floor in the Eastern Alps. Of alpinistic significance was the first ascent of the Northwest Face (Nordwestwand) on 15 July 1924 by Fritz Rigele and Willo Welzenbach. They were the first ones to use ice hooks (eishaken) to assist them; these were later developed into the ice screws used today. The Northwest Face was one of the classic ice walls of the Eastern Alps; the ice has since melted, however.

== Location and area ==
The Großes Wiesbachhorn is almost entirely surrounded by glaciers. To the north is the Wielingerkees, to the northeast the Sandbodenkees flows eastwards and down into the Sandboden and further into the Fuscher Ache. To the south lies the Teufelsmühlkees und im Westen das Kaindlkees. An important neighbouring mountain to the north, separated by the 3,211-metre-high wind gap of the Sandbodenscharte, is the Kleines Wiesbachhorn with a height of 3,286 metres. To the southwest, on the other side of the 3,265-metre-high Wielingerscharte, between the Kaindlkees and Teufelsmühlkees glaciers, lies the two Bratschenköpfe peaks (3,413 and 3,401 metres high). To the west the terrain falls away to the Mooserboden Reservoir, to the east into the Fuscher Tal. The nearest important settlement is Fusch an der Großglocknerstraße, about 10 kilometres away to the north as the crow flies.

== Ascents ==
The route originally used by the Fusch farmers at the end of the 18th century is rarely used today. It runs from Ferleiten and takes 3½ hours to reach the Schwarzenberg Hut and from there another 4 hours past the Bratschenköpfe peaks to the summit of the Horn. The usual present-day start point for ascents is the Heinrich Schwaiger Haus. From there the standard route runs over the Oberen Fochezkopf and along the Kaindlgrat ridge to the summit in about 3 hours. In the middle section of the route there is a 35° inclined firn edge (Firnschneide), the rock sections are rated at climbing grade UIAA I. The classic routes through the 500-metre-high Nordwest Face required ice climbing skills capable of coping with up to 60° gradients.

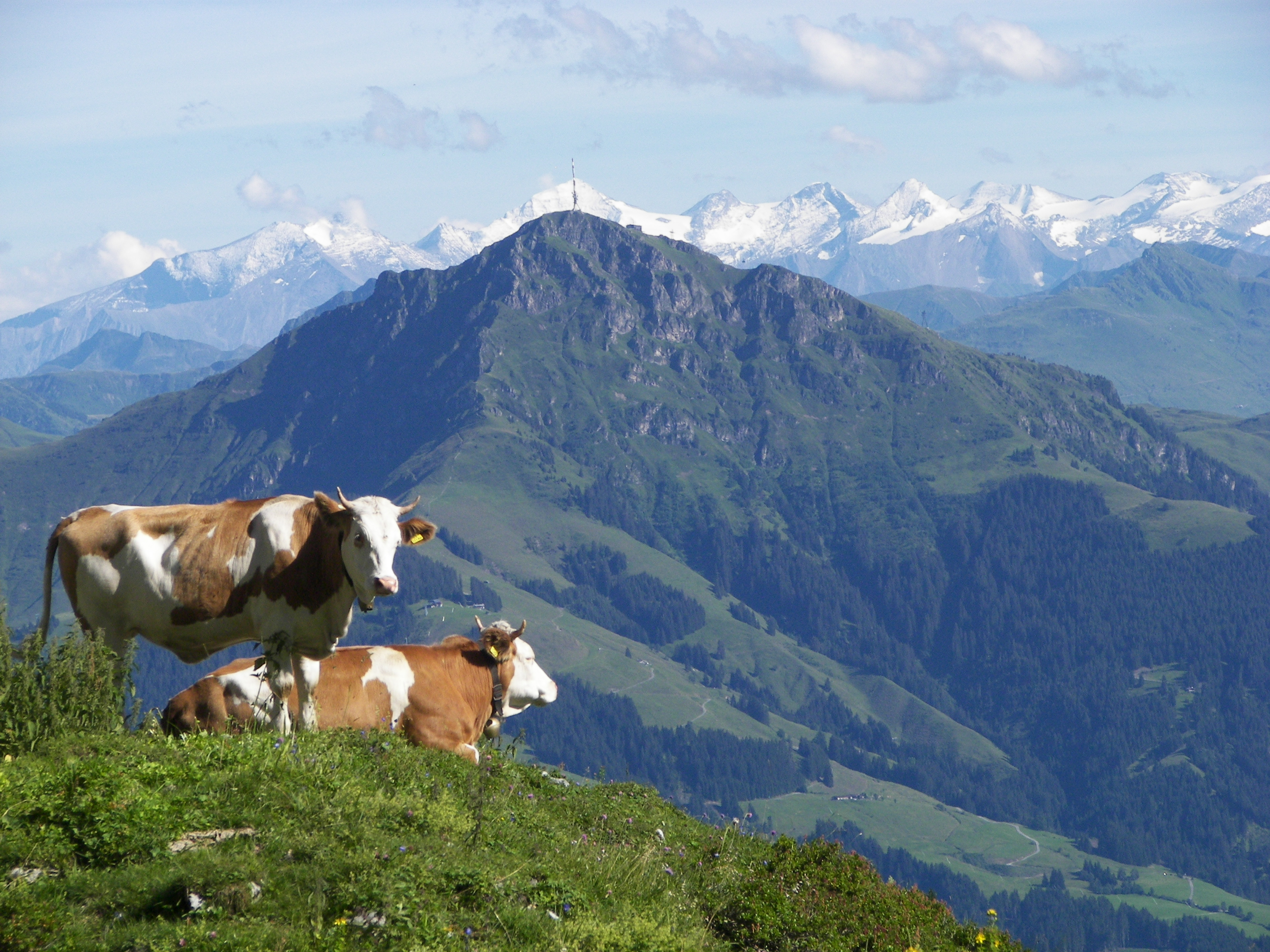
Wiesbachhorn Group, from the north over the Kitzbüheler Horn

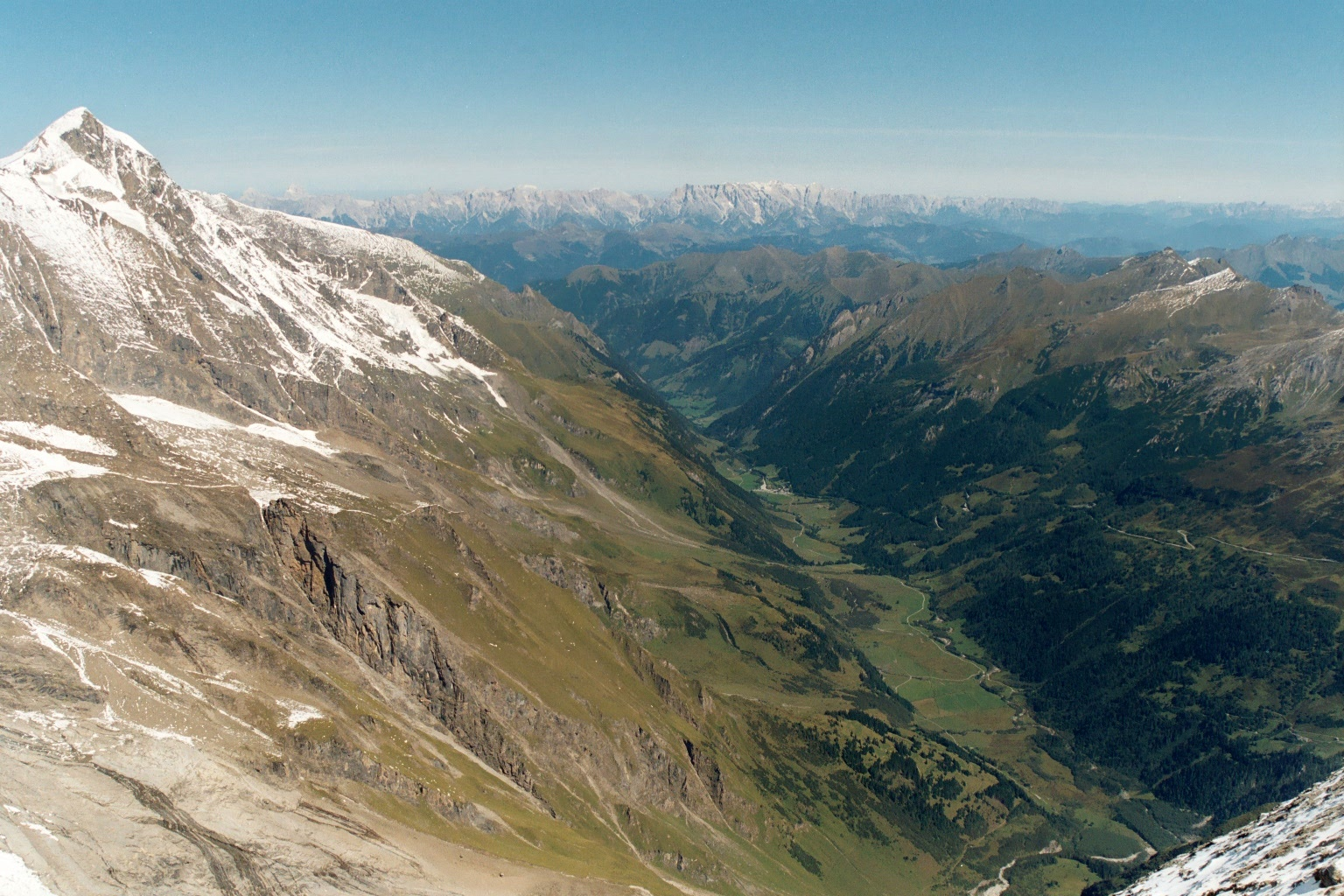
The top of the Großes Wiesbachhorn is over 2,400 metres above the valley of the Fuscher Ache

== See also ==
List of highest mountains of Austria

== Sources and maps ==
- Willi End: Alpine Club Guide Glocknergruppe, Bergverlag Rother, Munich, 2003, ISBN 3-7633-1266-8
- Eduard Richter: Die Erschliessung der Ostalpen, Vol III, Verlag des Deutschen und Oestereichischen Alpenvereins, Berlin 1894
- Alpine Club map 1:25.000, Sheet 40, Glocknergruppe
