= Weisshorn Hut =

Coordinates: 46°05′09″N 7°44′37″E

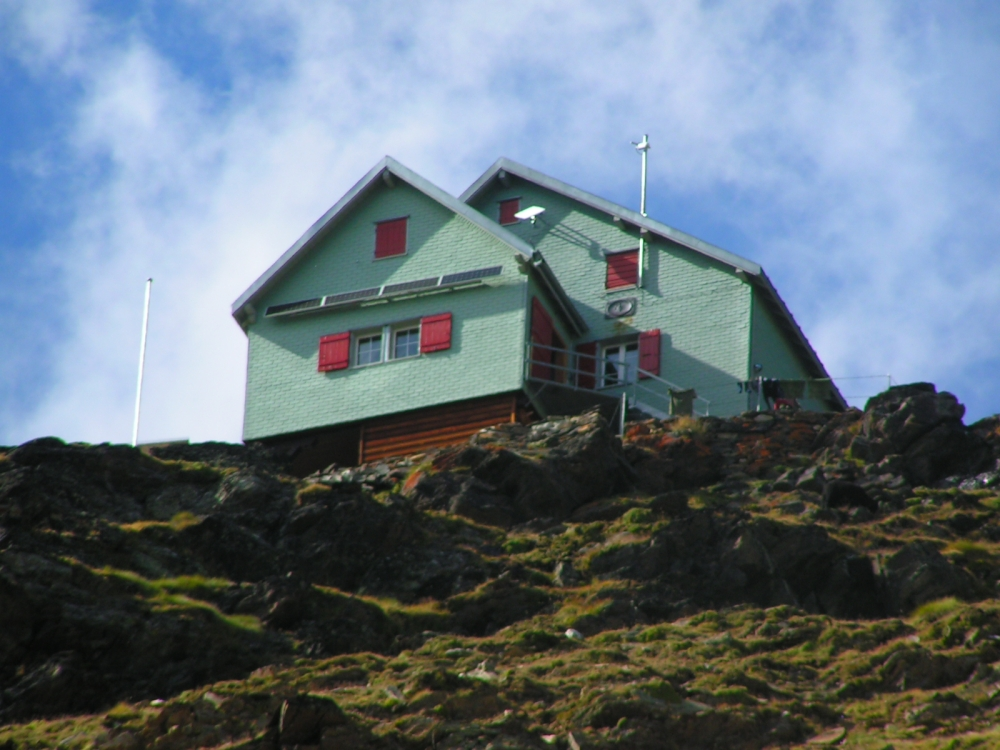
The Weisshorn Hut

The Weisshorn Hut (German: Weisshornhütte) is a mountain hut of the Swiss Alpine Club, located above Randa in the canton of Valais. It is located on the southern slopes of the Weisshorn, at a height of 2,932 metres above sea level, near the bottom of the Schali Glacier.

A trail climbing to the Schali Glacier (3,100 m) connects the Weisshorn Hut to Randa. The hut is mainly used for the ascent of the Weisshorn via the eastern ridge.
