= Tracuit Hut =

Coordinates: 46°07′49″N 7°40′46″E

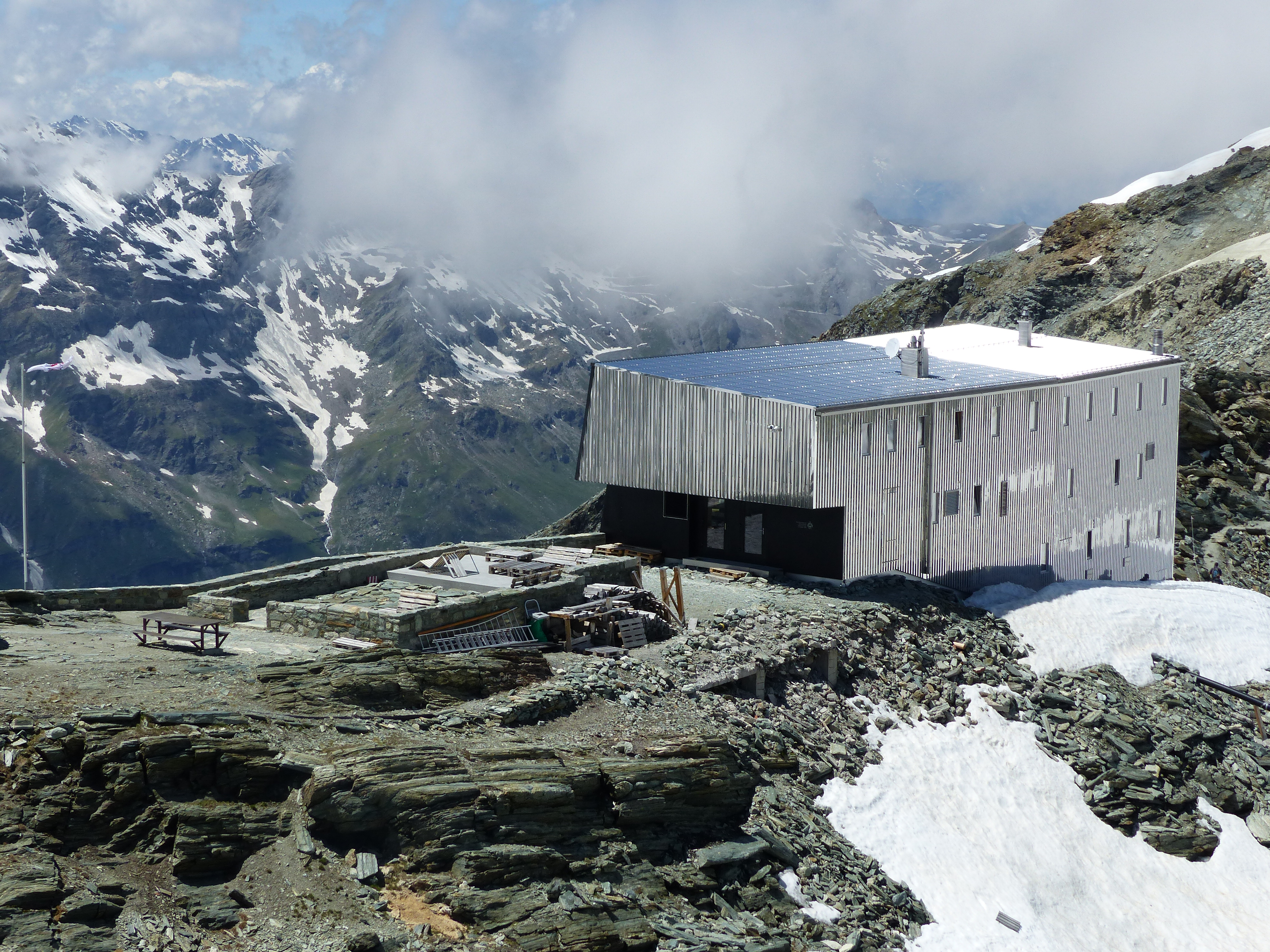
The Tracuit Hut

The Tracuit Hut (French: Cabane de Tracuit) is a mountain hut of the Swiss Alpine Club, located above Zinal in the canton of Valais. The hut lies at an elevation of 3,256 metres (10,682 ft) above sea level, at the Tracuit Pass, between Les Diablons and the Tête de Milon in the Pennine Alps.

The Tracuit Hut is the starting point for the ascents of Bishorn, Weisshorn and Les Diablons. The hut, lying on a ridge, is accessible to hikers by a trail from the west slopes. The Turtmann Glacier lies on the east side.

== See also ==
- List of buildings and structures above 3000 m in Switzerland
