= Pointe Burnaby =

Mountain in Switzerland

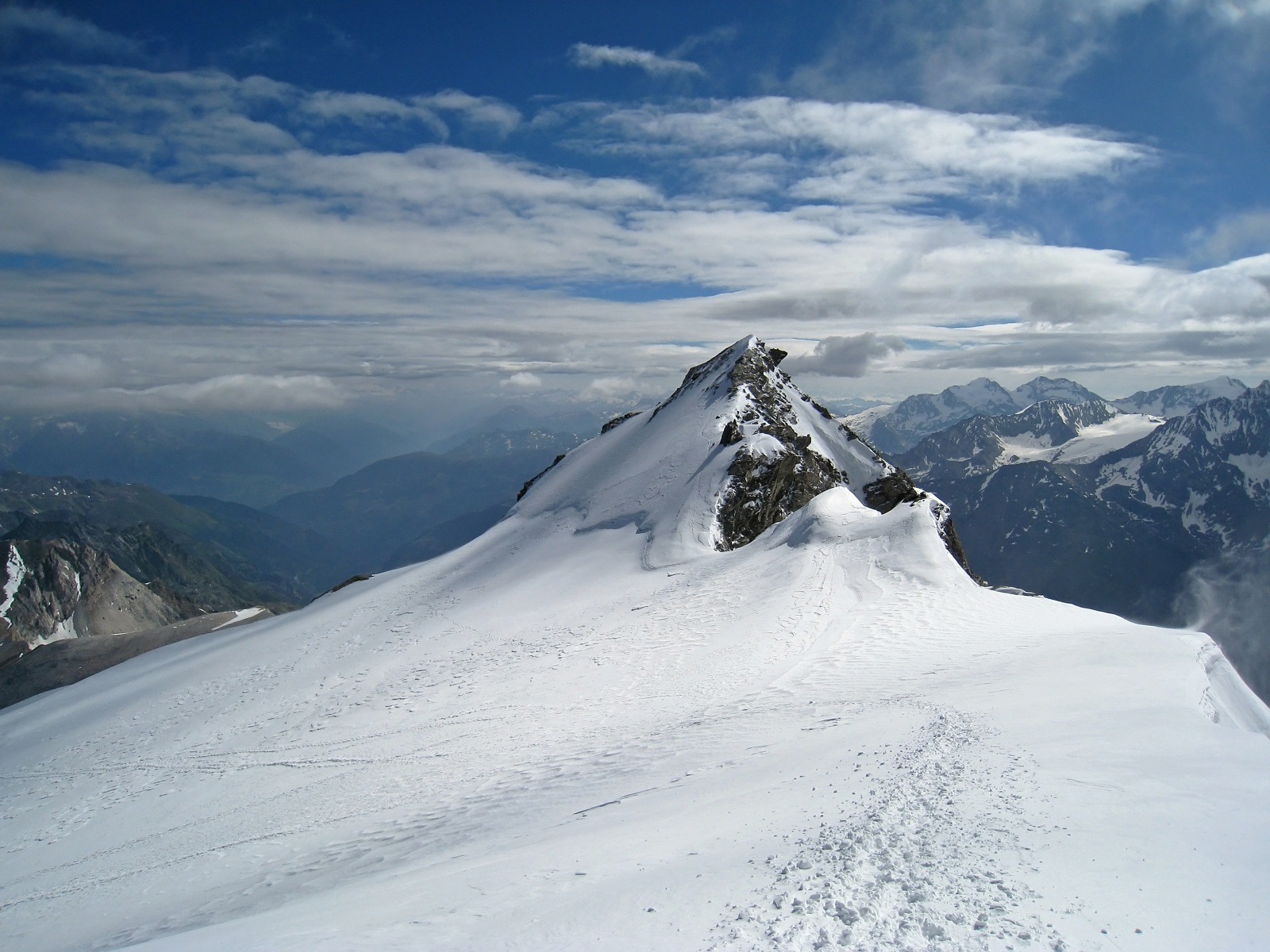

Highest point
- Elevation: 4,135 m (13,566 ft)
- Parent peak: Bishorn
- Coordinates: 46°7′7.4″N 7°43′4.7″E

Geography
- Location within Switzerland
- Location: Switzerland
- Parent range: Pennine Alps

The Pointe Burnaby is the east-summit of the Bishorn. Because of its small prominence it was included in the enlarged list of alpine four-thousanders.
