= Turtmannsee =

Lake in Valais, Switzerland

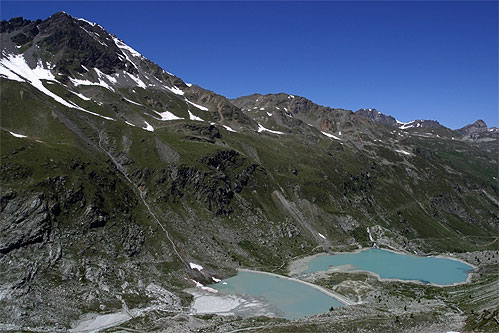

- Location within Canton of Valais Location within Piedmont Location within Switzerland Location within Italy Location within Alps
- Interactive map of Turtmannsee
- Location: Valais
- Coordinates: 46°10′07″N 7°41′35″E
- Basin countries: Switzerland
- Surface area: 9.2 ha (23 acres)
- Surface elevation: 2,177 m (7,142 ft)

The Turtmannsee is a reservoir located south of Gruben/Meiden at the foot of the Turtmann Glacier, in the Swiss canton of Valais. The lake has a surface area of 0.092 km² and is located at 2,177 metres above sea level. It is split between the municipalities of Oberems (west) and Turtmann-Unterems (east). Just above the Turtmannsee lies a smaller reservoir.

== See also ==
- List of mountain lakes of Switzerland
