= Grand Gendarme =

Mountain in Switzerland

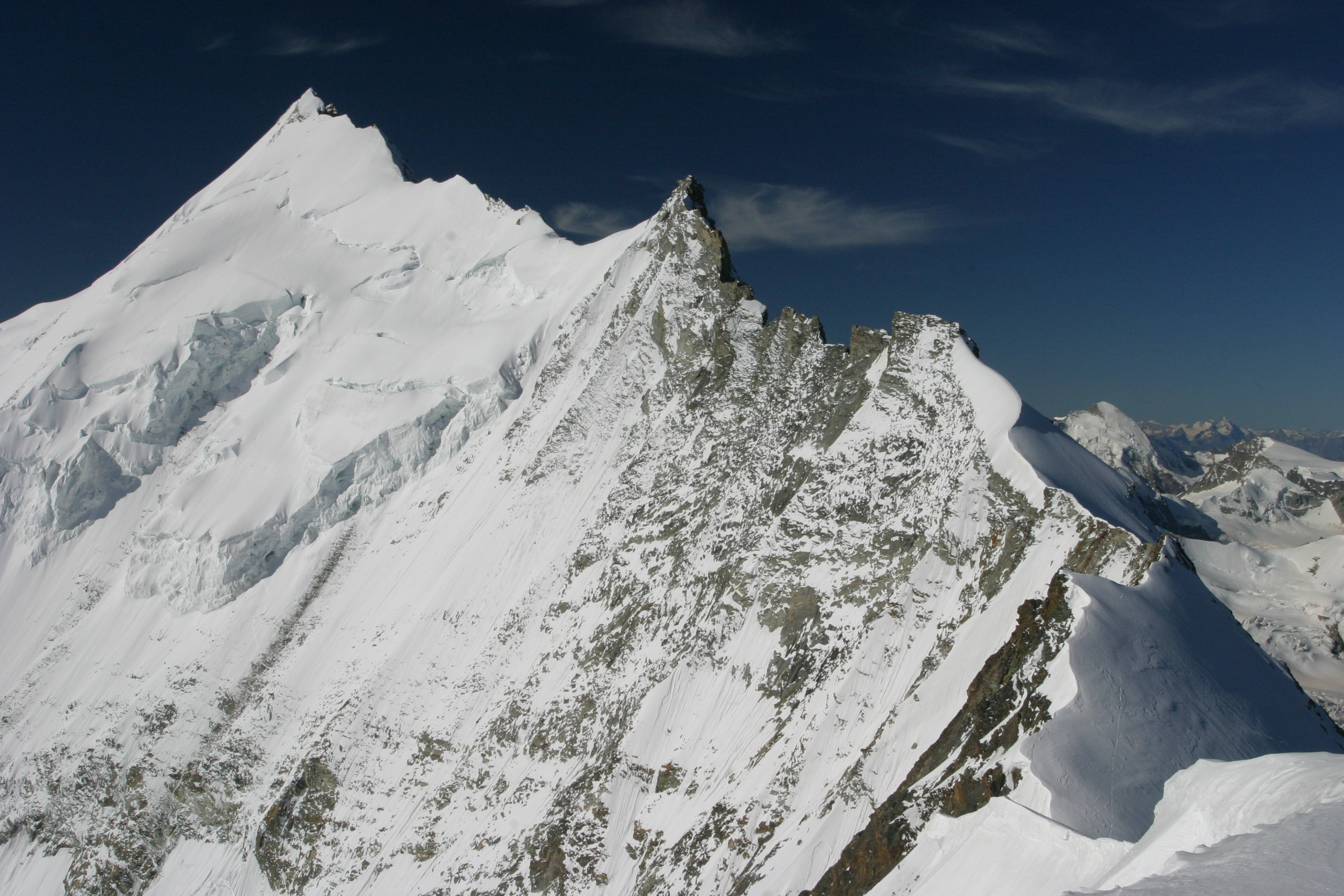
- Grand Gendarme and Weisshorn (left)

Highest point
- Elevation: 4,329 m (14,203 ft)
- Prominence: 57 m (187 ft)
- Parent peak: Weisshorn
- Coordinates: 46°06′26″N 7°42′42.8″E

Geography
- Location within Switzerland
- Location: Switzerland
- Parent range: Pennine Alps

The Grand Gendarme is a minor summit on the Weisshorn north ridge in the Pennine Alps. Because of its prominence it was included in the enlarged list of alpine four-thousanders.
