= Les Diablons =

Mountain in Switzerland

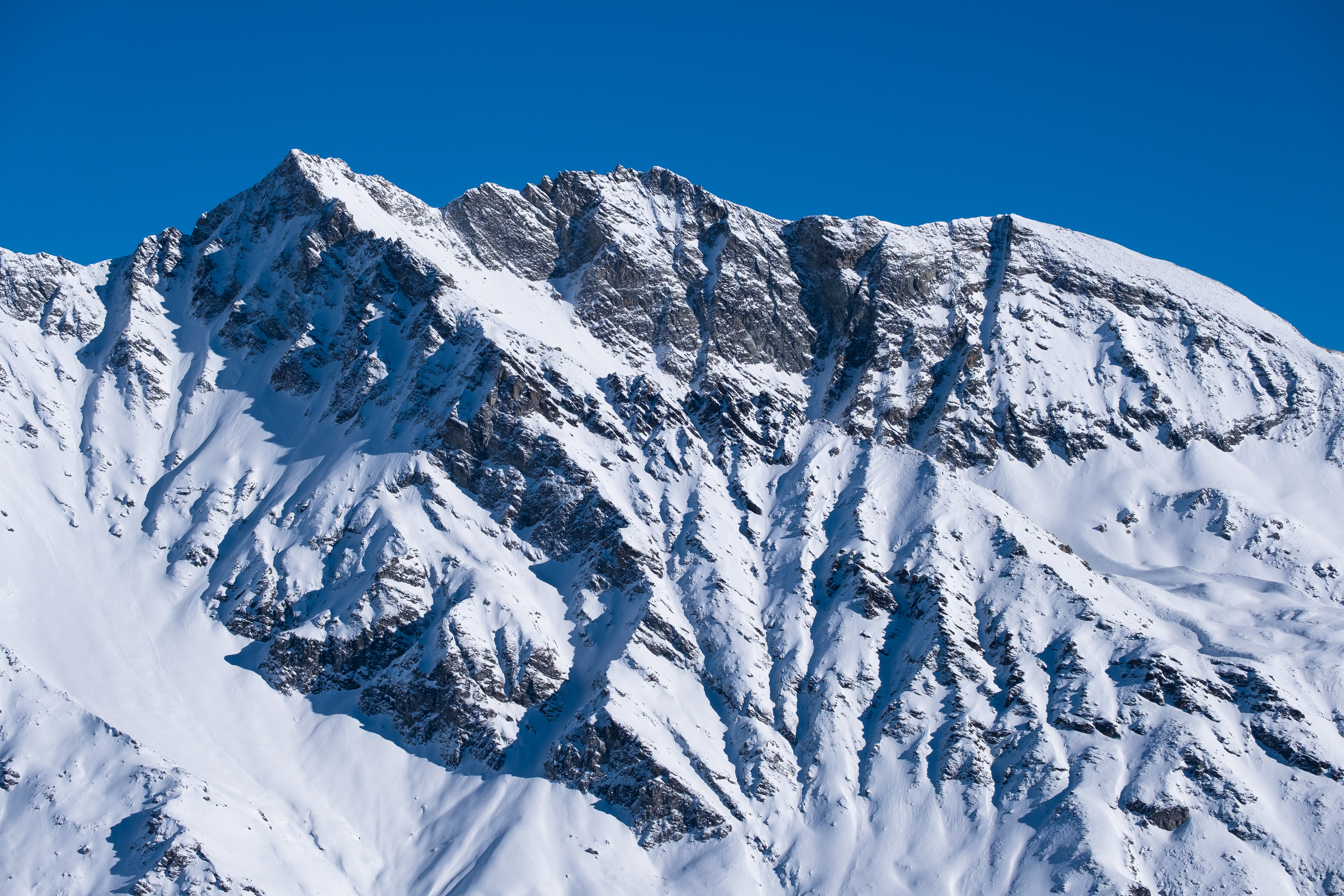
- View of Les Diablons from above Zinal

Highest point
- Elevation: 3,609 m (11,841 ft)
- Prominence: 379 m (1,243 ft)
- Listing: Alpine mountains above 3000 m
- Coordinates: 46°8′32.8″N 7°40′15.7″E

Geography
- Location within Switzerland
- Location: Valais, Switzerland
- Parent range: Pennine Alps

Les Diablons are a mountain of the Swiss Pennine Alps, overlooking Zinal in the canton of Valais. They lie between the valleys of Anniviers and Turtmann on the subrange of the Pennine Alps that culminates at the Weisshorn.

South of Les Diablons, on the Tracuit pass, is located the Tracuit Hut.

== See also ==
- List of mountains of Switzerland
