= Karl Wien =

German mountaineer (1906–1937)

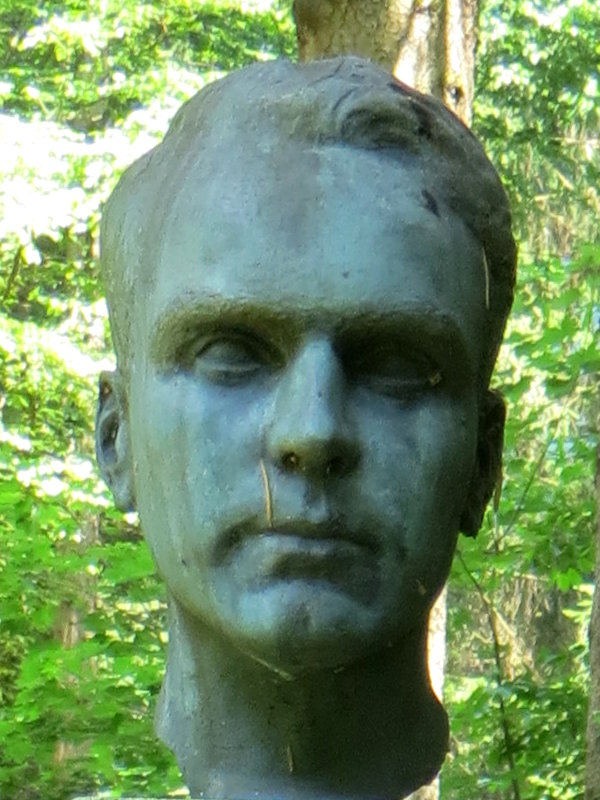
- Born: 10 September 1906; Würzburg, German Empire
- Died: c. 14 June 1937 (aged 30); Nanga Parbat, British Raj
- Occupation: Mountaineer

Karl ("Carlo") Wien (10 September 1906 – c. 14 June 1937) was a German mountaineer.

Born in Würzburg, Wien was the son of university professor Wilhelm Wien, and became a lecturer himself in the geography department of the Ludwig-Maximilians-Universität München. His mountaineering career began in the Alps, where with Willo Welzenbach he made the first ascent of the north face of the Grossglockner. Outside Europe he made a number of visits to Africa and the Himalaya, including Paul Bauer's 1931 attempt on Kangchenjunga, and a 1936 expedition to Sikkim during which he made the first ascent of Siniolchu.

In 1937, Karl Wien was chosen to lead a German expedition to Nanga Parbat, the first since ten climbers had died on the mountain in 1934. Some time between 14 and 16 June, Wien was camped with fifteen other climbers at Camp IV, below Rakhiot Peak, when it was overwhelmed by a massive avalanche. All sixteen men were killed in what remains the worst single disaster ever to occur on an eight thousand metre peak.
