= Leschaux Hut =

Mountain hut in the Mont Blanc massif, France

Coordinates: 45°53′43″N 6°58′49″E

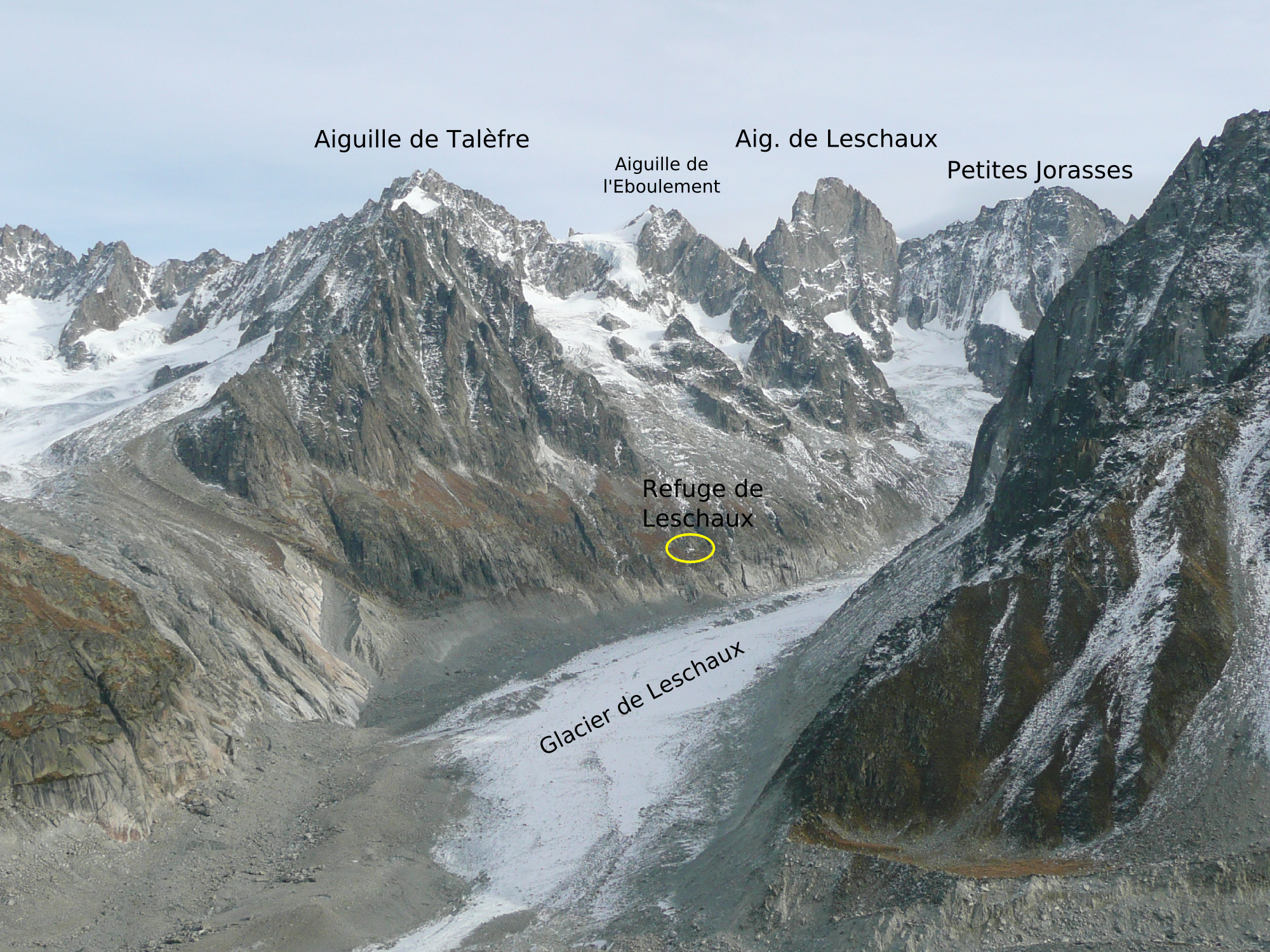
Location of Leschaux Hut beside Glacier de Leschaux

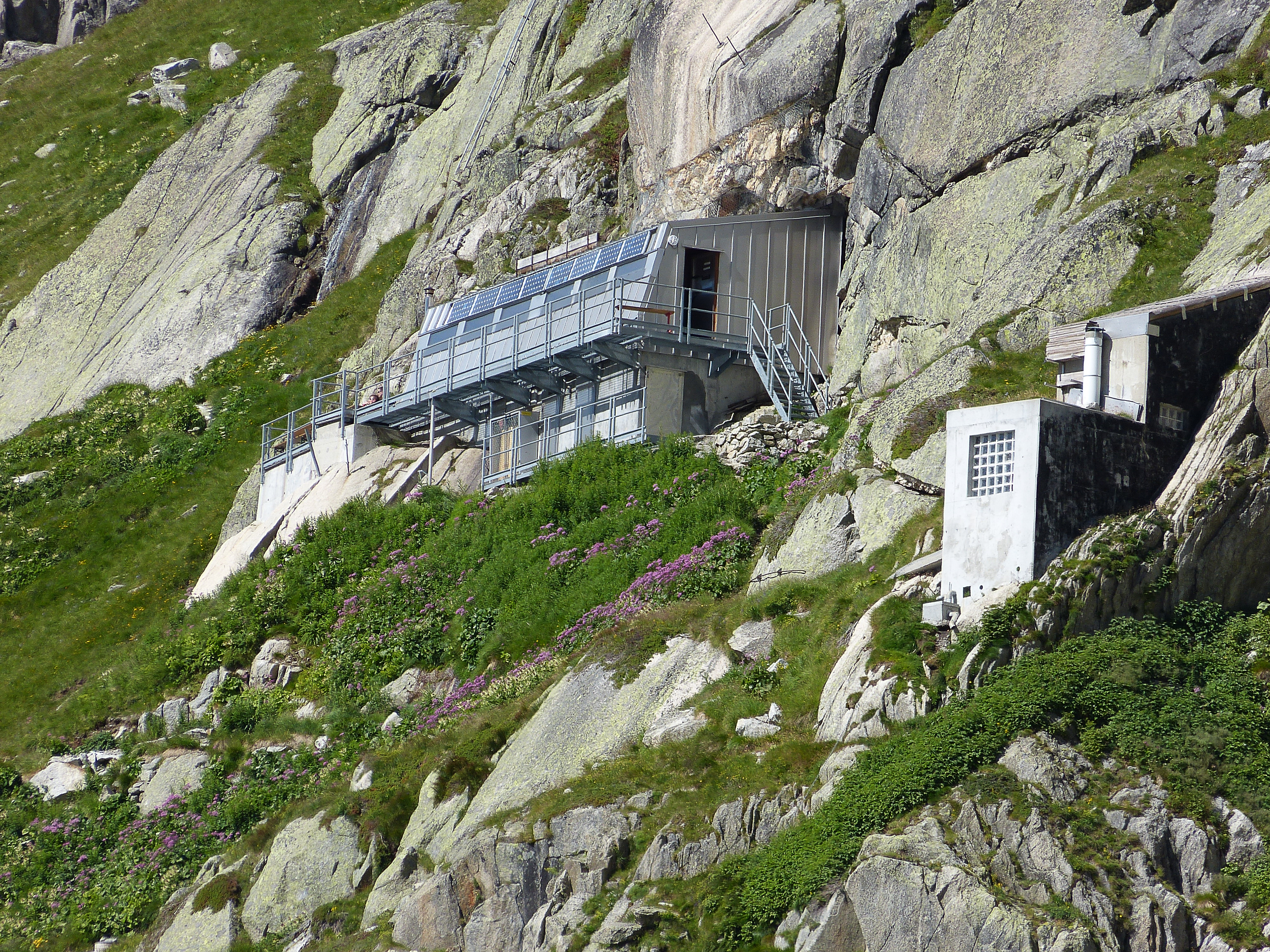
Leschaux Hut

The Leschaux Hut (French: Refuge de Leschaux) is a refuge in the Mont Blanc massif in the Alps. It is located at 2,431 m on the north side of the Glacier de Leschaux – a tributary of the Mer de Glace. It is owned by the CAF and can accommodate up to 19 people. The hut is used as a base by mountaineers climbing peaks such as Grandes Jorasses, Petites Jorasses and Mont Mallet. It is accessed by going up the Mer de Glace from Montenvers, and then up the Glacier de Leschaux. The first refuge was built in 1929. It was enlarged to 30 seats in 1934, but destroyed by an avalanche in 1954. A new hut was built in 1968 and was enlarged in 2003.
