= Fuscher Ache =

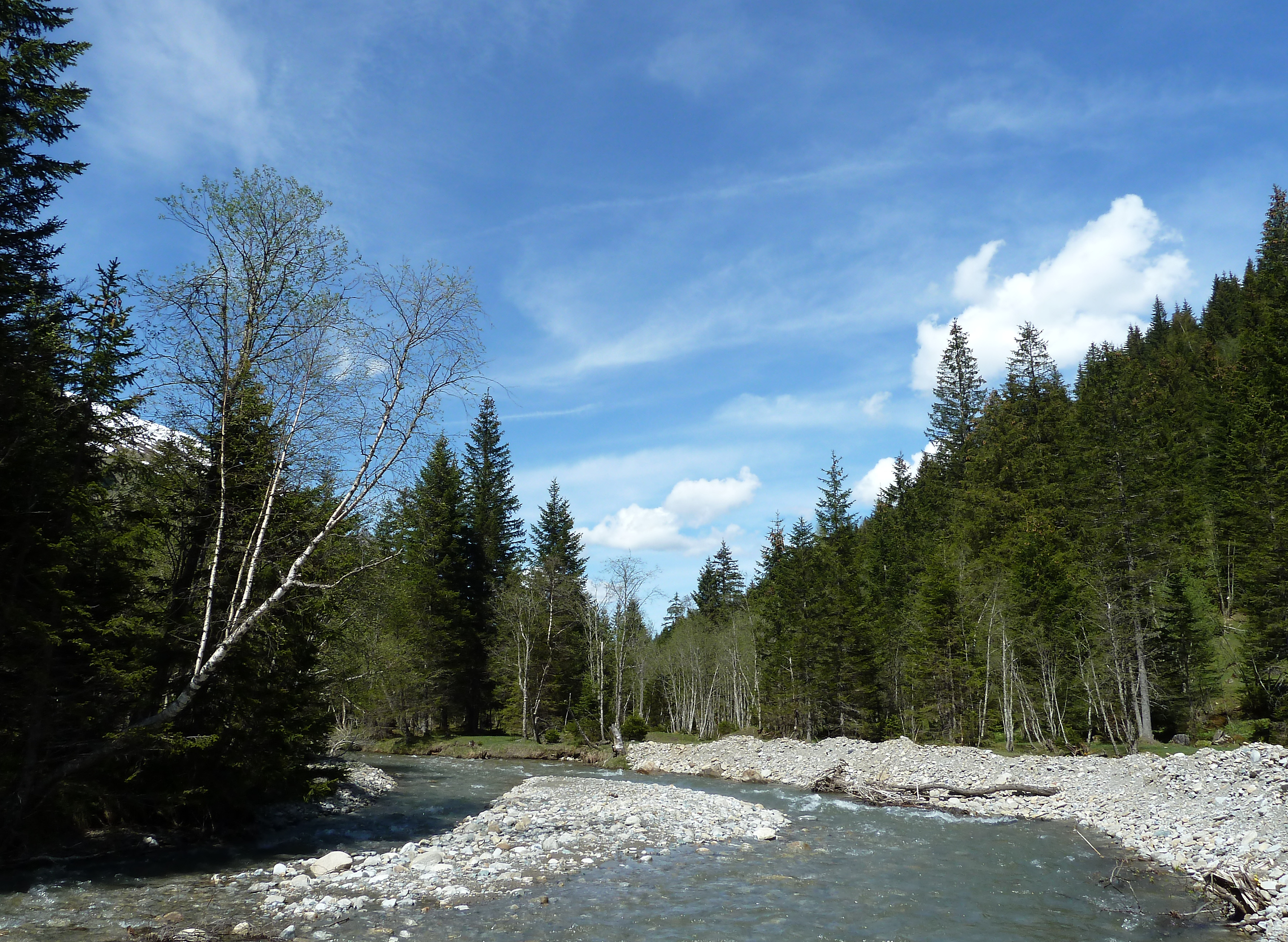
- The Fuscher Ache in its upper course

Location
- Country: Austria
- State: Salzburg

Physical characteristics
- Source
  - location: near Fuscher Törl
  - elevation: ca. 2,500 m (AA)
- Mouth
  - location: at Bruck an der Großglocknerstraße into the Salzach
  - coordinates: 47°17′06″N 12°50′09″E
- Length: 28 km (17 mi)

Basin features
- Progression: Salzach→ Inn→ Danube→ Black Sea
- Landmarks: Villages: Fusch an der Großglocknerstraße, Bruck an der Großglocknerstraße

The Fuscher Ache is a river of Salzburg, Austria, a right tributary of the River Salzach.

The Fuscher Ache rises as the confluence of the Kaefertalbach und the Traunerbach near the Fuscher Törl at a height of about 2,500 m (AA) in the Lower Pinzgau. It flows from south to north through the valley of the same name, passing the small village of Fusch an der Großglocknerstraße. It supplies a drinking water reservoir for the village, its water quality being very high. It is rich in fish such as brown trout, grayling and char. After about 28 km (17 mi) it empties into the Salzach at Bruck an der Großglocknerstraße.
