= Bishorn =

Mountain in Switzerland

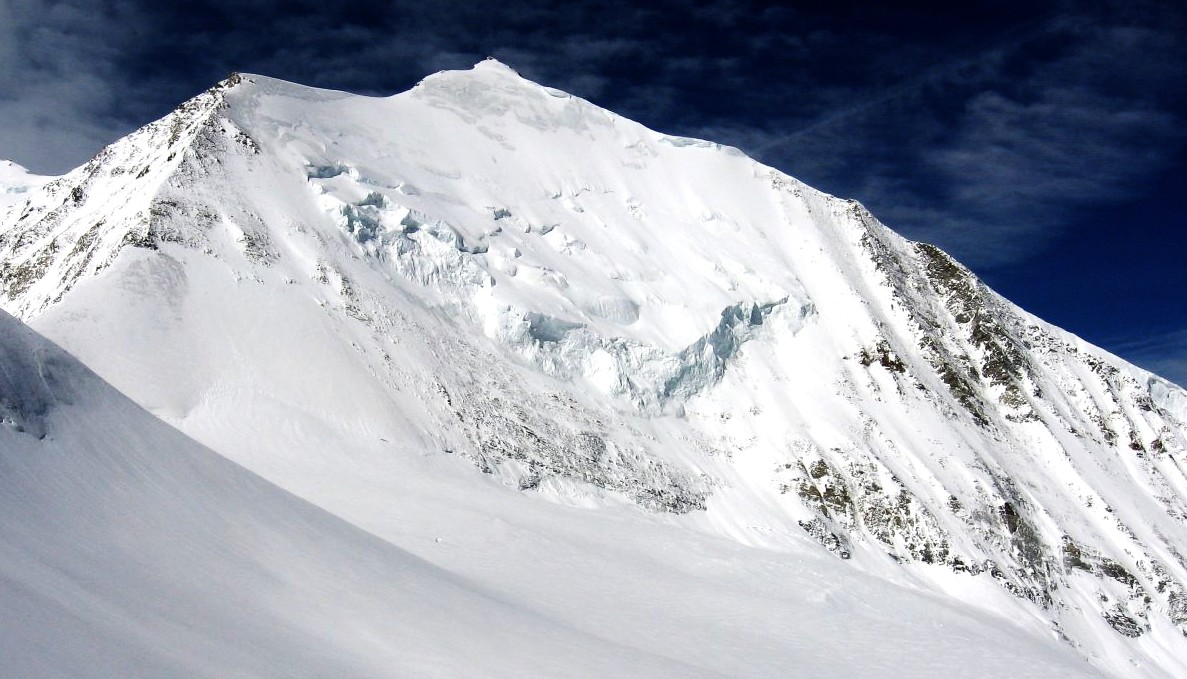
- Northern wall

Highest point
- Elevation: 4,151 m (13,619 ft)
- Prominence: 90 m (300 ft)
- Parent peak: Weisshorn
- Coordinates: 46°7′4″N 7°42′53″E

Geography
- Location within Switzerland
- Bishorn location and nearby peaks and huts Location in Switzerland
- Location: Switzerland
- Parent range: Pennine Alps

Climbing
- First ascent: G. S. Barnes and R. Chessyre-Walker with guides Joseph Imboden and J. M. Chanton on 18 August 1884
- Easiest route: North-west flank, (F)

The Bishorn (4,151 m) is a mountain in the Pennine Alps in Switzerland, just north of the Weisshorn.

The mountain has two distinct summits, separated by a 600-metre easy-angled snow ridge.

- The west and higher summit (4,151 m), first ascent by G. S. Barnes and R. Chessyre-Walker with guides Joseph Imboden and J. M. Chanton on 18 August 1884.
- The east summit (Pointe Burnaby, 4,134 m), first ascent by Elizabeth Burnaby with guides Joseph Imboden and Peter Sarbach on 6 May 1884.

== Huts ==
Huts serving the peak are the Cabane de Tracuit (3,256 m) and the Turtmann hut (2,519 m).

Access to both huts is snow-free in summertime. The Tracuit hut is normally accessed from the Zinal valley, a long and demanding walk of around five hours from the village to the hut.

The Turtmann hut is primarily used for climbing the Barrhorn and the Brunegghorn. Note that climbing the Bishorn from the Turtmann hut requires a far longer glacier walk through sections with numerous crevasses.

== Access roads ==
The access roads to the huts are from the Rhone valley in the north. The road to Zinal starts at Sierre, and the other road starts from Turtmann village. In both cases these are good and attractive mountain roads typical of the area.

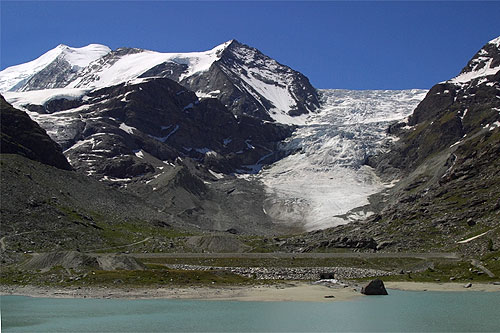
The Bishorn (left, background) and the Turtmann Glacier (right)

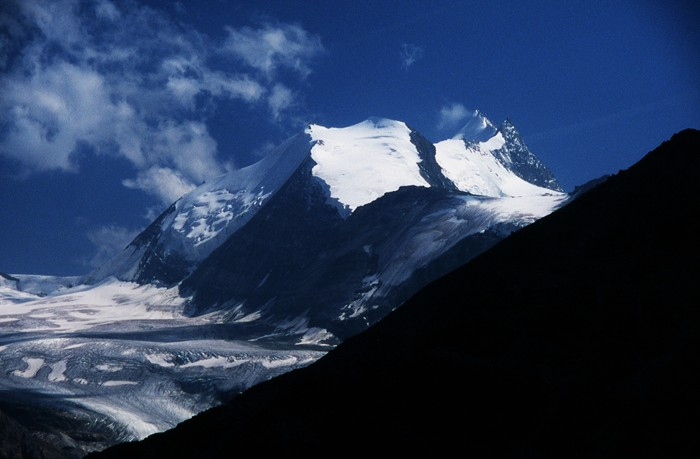
Bishorn and Weisshorn (right)

== See also ==
- List of 4000 metre peaks of the Alps
