= Paul Bauer =

German poet and mountaineer

Medal record

Art competitions

Representing Germany

Olympic Games
Gold medal – first place	1932 Los Angeles	Literature

Paul Friedrich Peter Bauer (29 December 1896 – 9 January 1990) was a German poet and mountaineer.

== Biography ==
Bauer was born at Kusel in the Palatinate region of Germany. As a schoolboy, he first visited the Alps on a cycling tour through the Dolomites via Bolzano and Merano to Lake Constance. He saw active service in the First World War and spent the end of that war as a prisoner in England. His interest in climbing continued as he studied law in Munich. Travelling on a tight budget with friends he tackled many of the classic climbs in central Europe. In 1928 he visited the Caucasus with three friends, where they climbed to the summit of Dykh-Tau – second highest peak in Europe. In 1929 he led a team of nine German Mountaineers in a first attempt on Kangchenjunga. They equipped themselves well, but were turned back by poor weather and bad conditions having reached 26,000 feet. Returning in 1931, Bauer's team were again rebuffed by the sheer size and scale of the Mountain. It was during this second attempt on Kangchenjunga, that Hermann Schaller lost his life. In 1932 Bauer won a gold medal in the art competitions of the Olympic Games for his "Am Kangehenzonga", an account of his 1931 attempt to climb the Himalayan peak Kangchenjunga.

Following two failed attempts Bauer found it difficult to raise funds for a third attempt; the German public's attention now turned to Nanga Parbat. After the disastrous 1934 expedition, Bauer headed up a training climb in 1936 which found success on Siniolchu. His ventures led to prominent positions in German mountain climbing organizations during the Nazi era. One of his objectives during that time was to eliminate Jews from these organizations. During World War II, Bauer was an officer in the Gebirgsjäger, a regiment of specially trained Alpine Troops. He describes his return to the Caucasus as not what he had expected – at the head of two thousand troops in 1943.

Bauer has been described as "perhaps the greatest mountaineer of his generation".

== Publications in English ==
- Bauer, Paul (October 1937). Himalayan Campaign. Basil Blackwell Oxford.
- Bauer, Paul (1938). Himalayan Quest. Nicholson and Watson London.
- Bauer, Paul (1955). Kangchenjunga Challenge. William Kimber, London.
- Bauer, Paul (1956). The Siege of Nanga Parbat 1856–1953. Rupert Hart-Davis, London.
