= Weisshorn =

Mountain in the Pennine Alps

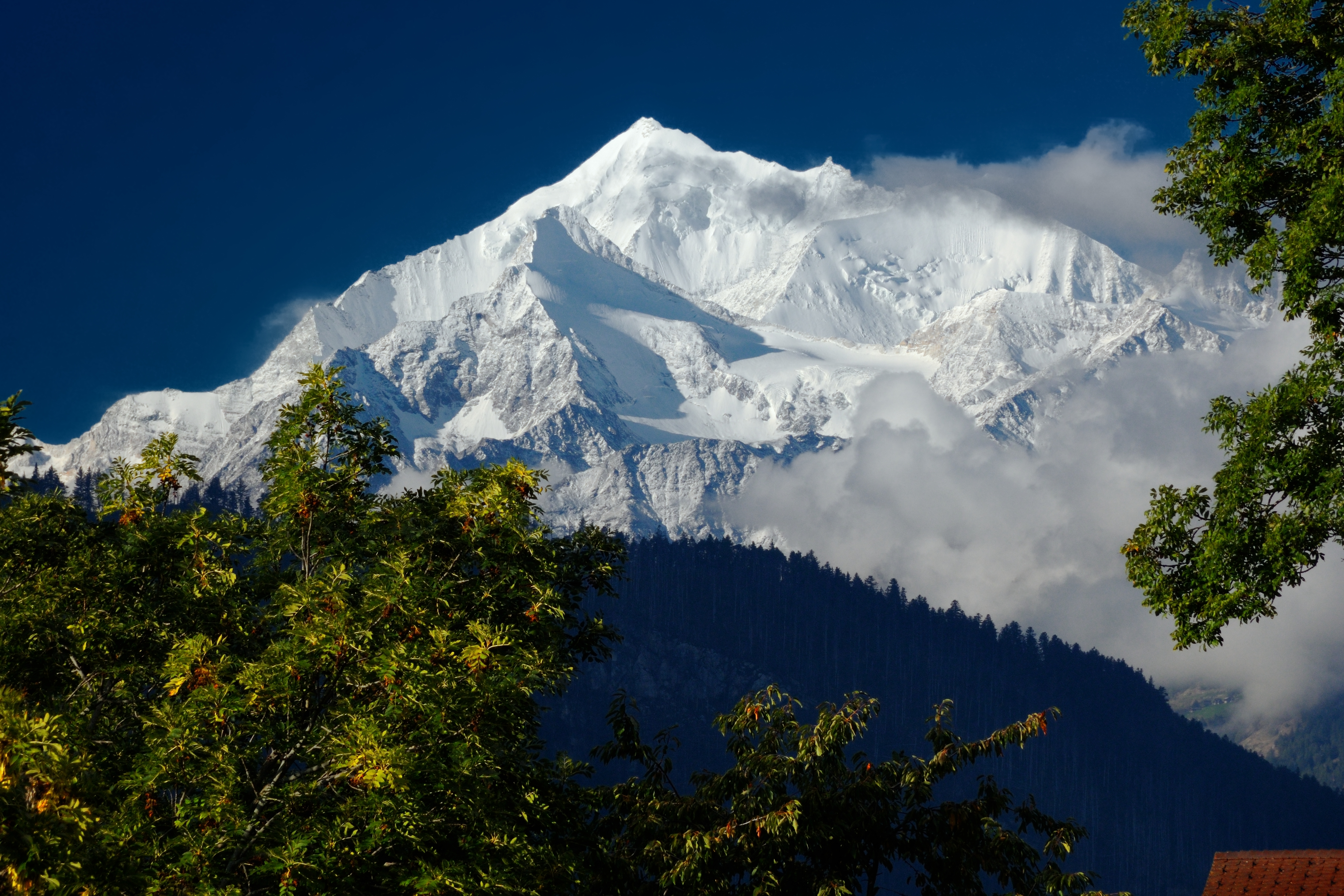
- North-east view of the Weisshorn

Highest point
- Elevation: 4,505 m (14,780 ft)
- Prominence: 1234 m ↓ Furggjoch
- Parent peak: Monte Rosa
- Isolation: 11.0 km → Dom
- Coordinates: 46°06′06″N 7°42′58″E

Naming
- English translation: white peak/mountain

Geography
- Location within Switzerland
- Weisshorn location and nearby peaks and huts Location in Switzerland
- Location: Valais, Switzerland
- Parent range: Pennine Alps
- Topo map: Swisstopo 1328 Randa

Climbing
- First ascent: 19 August 1861 by John Tyndall with guides J.J. Bennen and Ulrich Wenger
- Easiest route: rock/snow/ice climb

The Weisshorn (German, lit. white peak/mountain) is a major peak of Switzerland and the Alps, culminating at 4,505 metres (14,780 feet) above sea level. It is part of the Pennine Alps and is located between the valleys of Anniviers and Zermatt in the canton of Valais. In the latter valley, the Weisshorn is one of the many 4000ers surrounding Zermatt, with Monte Rosa and the Matterhorn.

The Weisshorn was first climbed in 1861 from Randa by the Irish physicist John Tyndall, accompanied by the guides J.J. Bennen and Ulrich Wenger. Nowadays, the Weisshorn Hut is used on the normal route. The Weisshorn is considered by many mountaineers to be the most beautiful mountain in the Alps and Switzerland for its pyramidal shape and pure white slopes.

In April and May 1991, two consecutive rockslides occurred from a cliff above the town of Randa on the east side of the massif, below the Bis Glacier.

== Geography ==
The Weisshorn is situated in the southern canton of Valais, about 25 km southwards from the Rhone between Sierre and Visp. It is the culminating point on the north–south orientated chain separating the Val d'Anniviers to the west and the Mattertal to the east and enclosing the Turtmanntal to the north, the tripoint between these valleys being located just north of its main summit. The Weisshorn faces the slightly higher Dom across the Mattertal, with the village of Randa 3100 metres below these two summits. After the Dom, the Weisshorn is the second-highest Alpine summit situated completely out the main chain and fully within Switzerland. On both sides of the Weisshorn range, the water end up in the Rhone, through the Navizence (west) and the Vispa (east). The Weisshorn and the Dom are only two of the many 4000-metre peaks surrounding the region of Zermatt, along with the Zinalrothorn, the Dent Blanche, the Dent d'Hérens, the Matterhorn and, second highest in the Alps, Monte Rosa.

The Weisshorn has a pyramidal shape and its faces are separated by three ridges descending steeply from the summit. Two of these are nearly in a straight line, one running approximately north and the other south. The third ridge is nearly at right angles to these two, running almost due east. In the compartment between the northern and eastern spurs lies the Bis Glacier (Bisgletscher). It is connected with the summit by long and extremely steep slopes of snow. In the compartment between the eastern and southern spurs lies the Schali Glacier (Schaligletscher). Ranges of steep rocks rise round the whole basin of this glacier, except in one or two places where they are interrupted by couloirs of snow. Finally, on the western side the mountain presents one gigantic face of rocky precipice. This face rises above the Weisshorn Glacier (Glacier du Weisshorn) and the Moming Glacier. The northern spur forks out at a considerable distance below the summit into two branches enclosing the Turtmann Glacier. The eastern branch connects the mountain with the Bishorn (4,153 m), across the Weisshornjoch.

== Geology ==
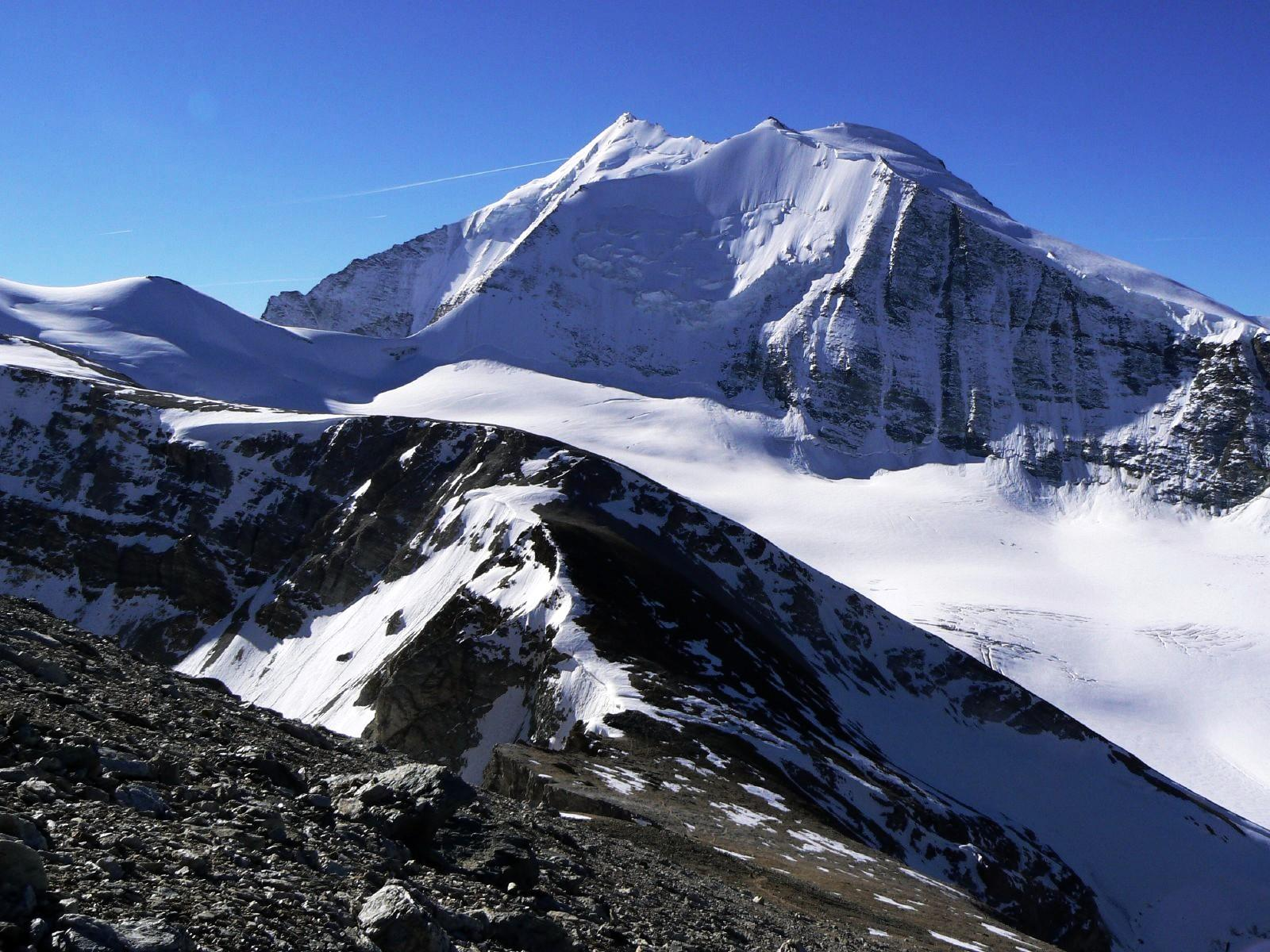
Close-up view from the Barrhorn with the north face of the Bishorn in foreground

The Weisshorn is the culminating point of the Dent Blanche nappe, a klippe belonging to the Austroalpine nappes. The mountain is composed of gneisses; the west face is also composed of sedimentary rocks from the cretaceous period.

== Climbing history ==
The mountain was first climbed on 19 August 1861 by the physicist John Tyndall, with guides J. J. Bennen and Ulrich Wenger. Their itinerary corresponds to the normal route for climbing the mountain today: the east ridge, starting from the Weisshorn Hut.

=== 1860 attempt ===
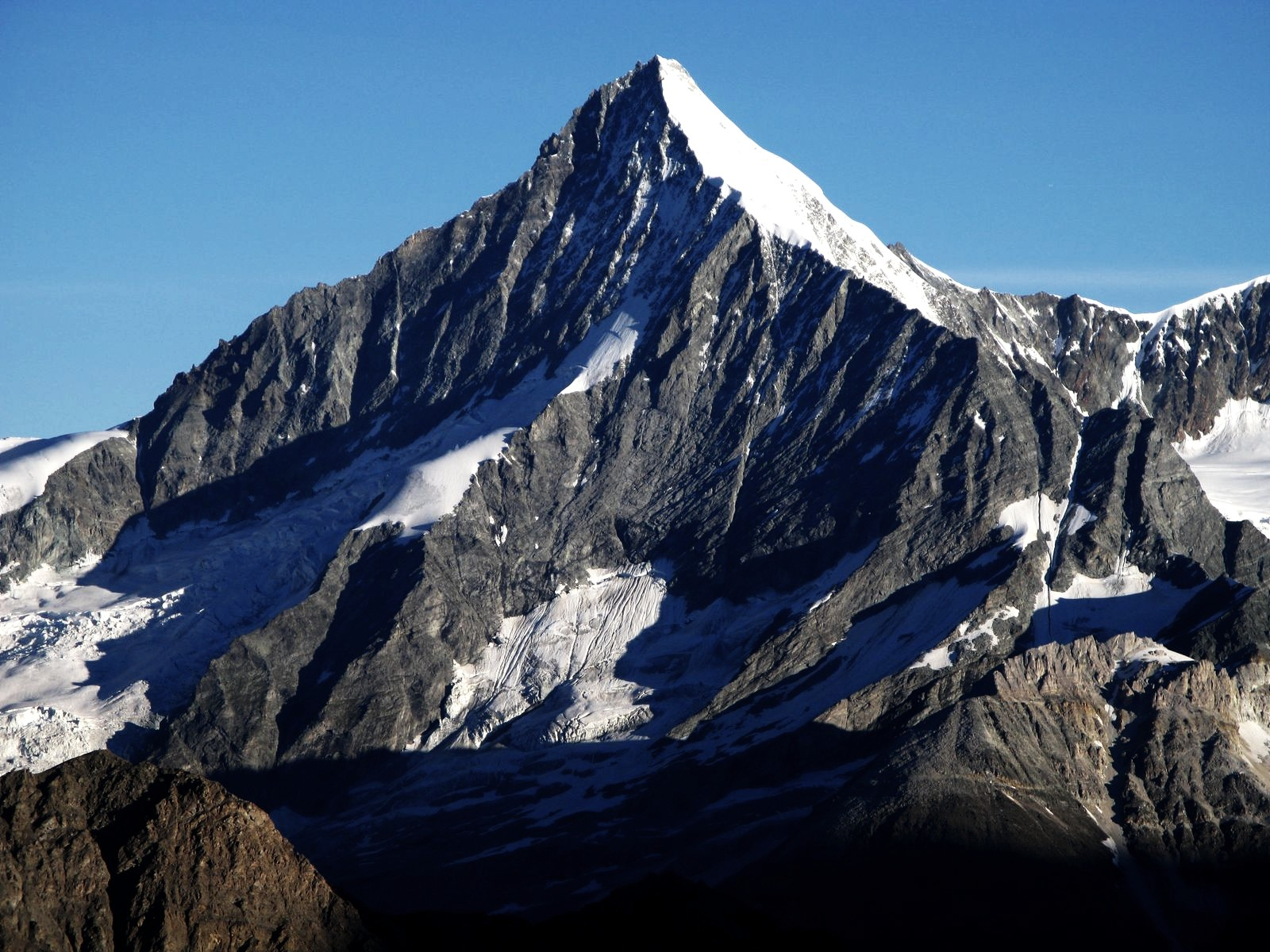
The south-east face (the Schaligrat on the left, the east ridge on the right) rising over the Schali Glacier

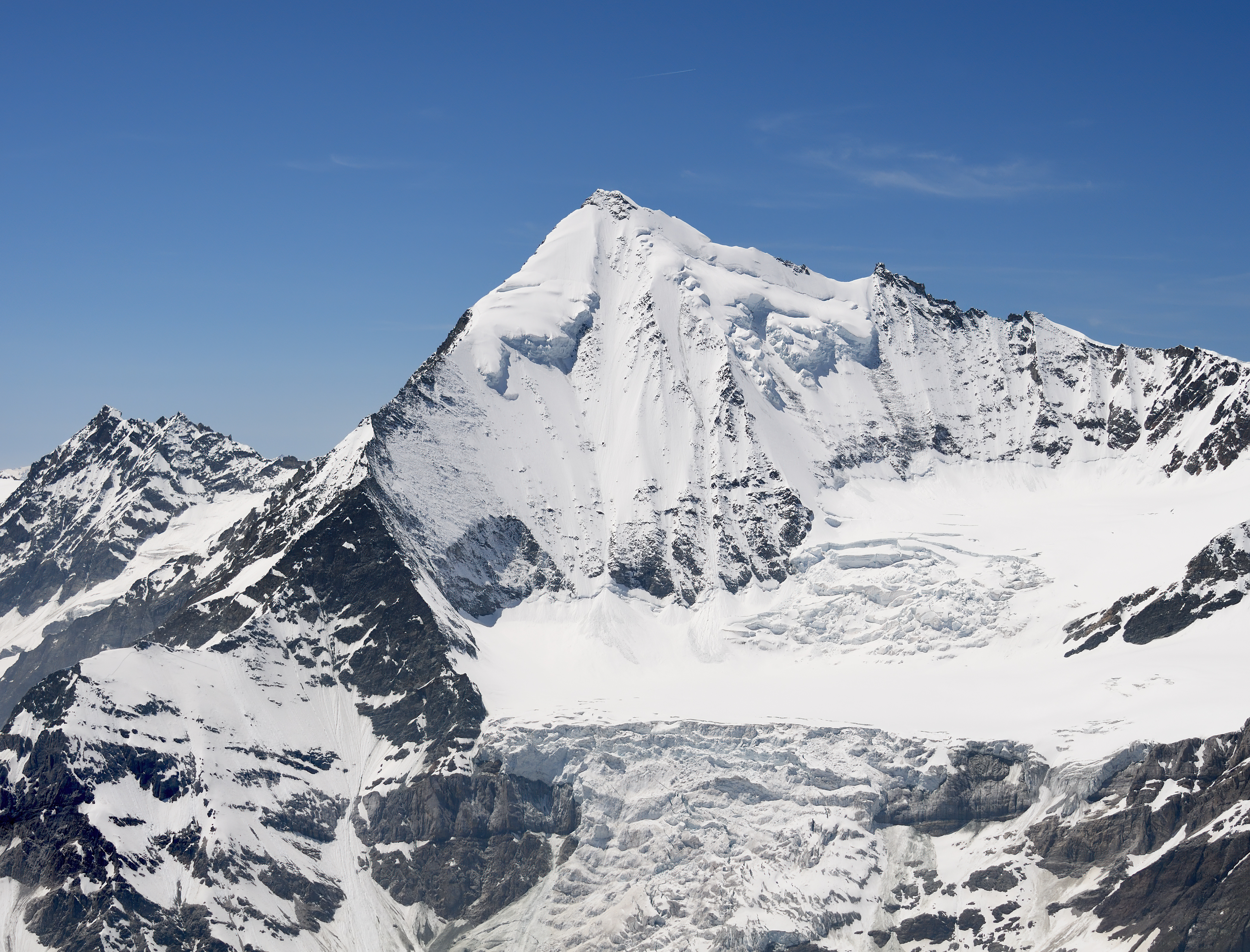
The north-east face with the north ridge to the right of the summit and the east ridge to the left

In 1860 an attempt was made by C. E. Mathews by the southern face. He came to Zermatt with Melchior Anderegg, and engaged Johann Kronig as second guide. They slept at the huts of Schallenbergalp and started at half-past one on the morning of 1 July. Crossing the moraine, they walked until they reached a steep and rugged portion of the glacier, which hid the mountain from their view; and rounding this obstruction with some difficulty, they reached the upper portion of the glacier about five o'clock. They saw that the ridges were thickly coated over with fresh snow, and, except a little patch of rock some 700 or 800 feet (240 m) below the summit, the whole mass was of brilliant and dazzling whiteness. They decided to try the southern side which seemed less steep and more practicable to Melchior but an avalanche stopped them:

"For six mortal hours we toiled up the steep face of the mountain...A great many steps had to be cut, but for the most part we were able to tread out our foot-holds in the snow. About half-past nine the difficulties became much greater - ten or twelve inches of snow rested upon the ice. We could not get safe footing upon it, and my clinometer indicated an angle of 48 or 49 degrees. The necessity of clearing away the snow before the step could be cut in the ice beneath it, made Melchior's work very arduous, and the higher we got the greater the difficulties became. We had to take off veil and spectacles, and use all our eyes, the footholds were so insecure, and this, though the sun was extremely hot and there was not a cloud to be seen. Suddenly the heat of the sun loosened some snow just above us, and down came a little avalanche quite near enough to be exceedingly unpleasant."

The guide Kronig asked Mathews to give up the expedition. They turned back and reached Zermatt in the evening, after nineteen hours of walking. They experienced other avalanches on the descent and the eyes of Mathews were severely burnt.

=== First ascent ===
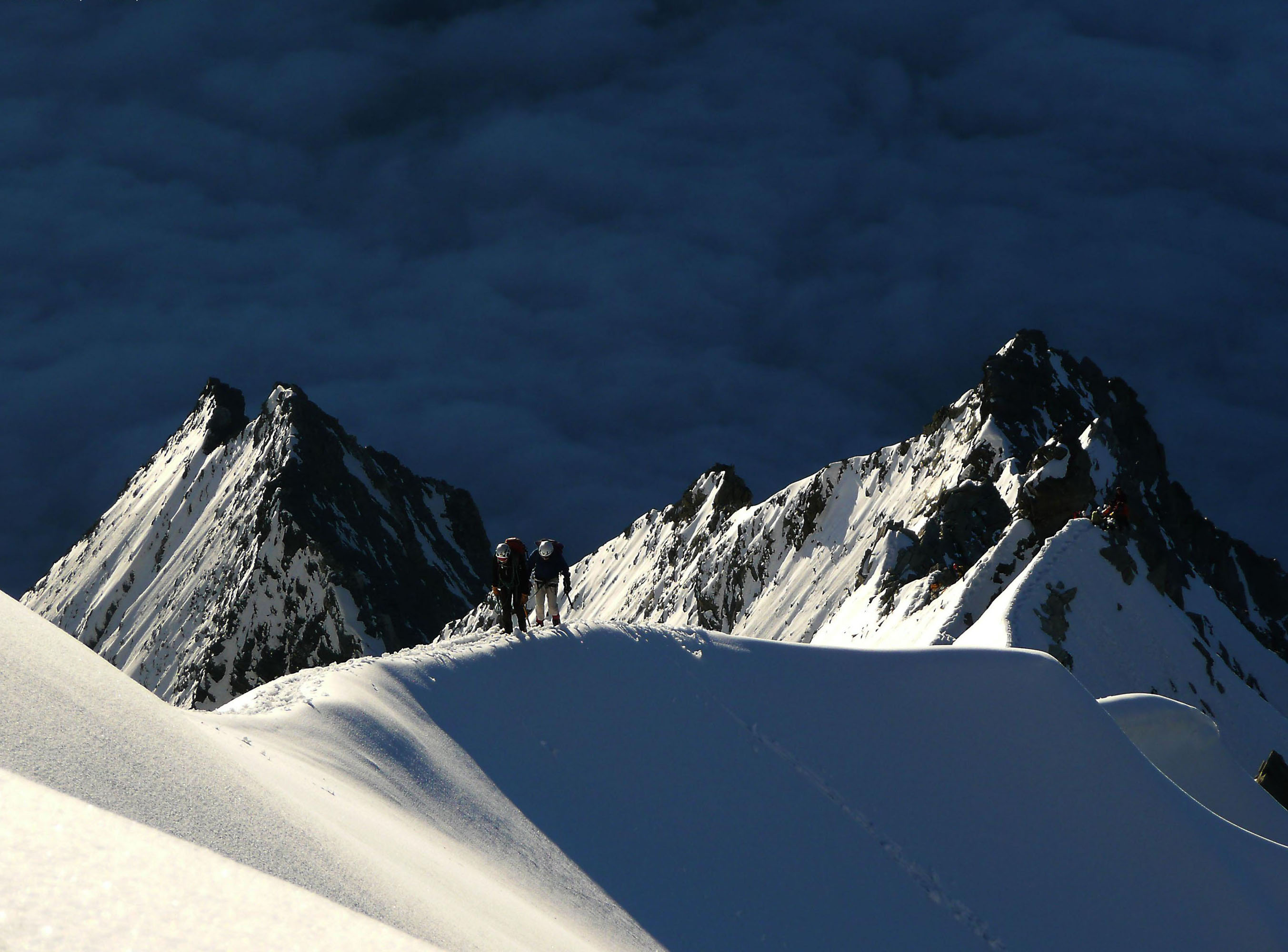
Climbers on the east ridge

Accompanied by the guides J.J. Bennen, of Laax, and Ulrich Wenger, of Grindelwald, John Tyndall started the ascent from Randa at 1.00 p.m. on 18 August 1861. They had a bivouac and resumed the climb at 3.35 a.m. on the next day. Tyndall was optimistic but the ascent became difficult, he wrote:

"Sometimes it was a fair pull upwards, sometimes an oblique twist round the corner of a rock tower; sometimes it was the grip of the finger ends in a fissure and lateral shifting of the whole body in a line parallel to the crack. Many times I found myself with my feet highest and my head lowest."

They reached a dangerous thin ridge of snow, little wider than a hand's breadth, with precipices on either side. The guide Bennen trod the snow down and saw that it was firm enough to cross. Tyndall and Wenger followed Bennen, but yet the summit seemed less attainable and they were all tired. However Tyndall steeled himself with patriotic thoughts:

"I thought of Englishmen in battle, of the qualities which had made them famous: it was mainly the quality of not knowing when to yield - of fighting for duty even after they had ceased to be animated by hope. Such thoughts helped to lift me over the rocks."

After four hours of struggle they reached a sharp ridge of snow and finally arrived to the summit. The return was found to be not much less difficult than the ascent; and they regained Randa at 11 p.m., after about 20 hours of almost constant hard work.

=== Other ascents ===
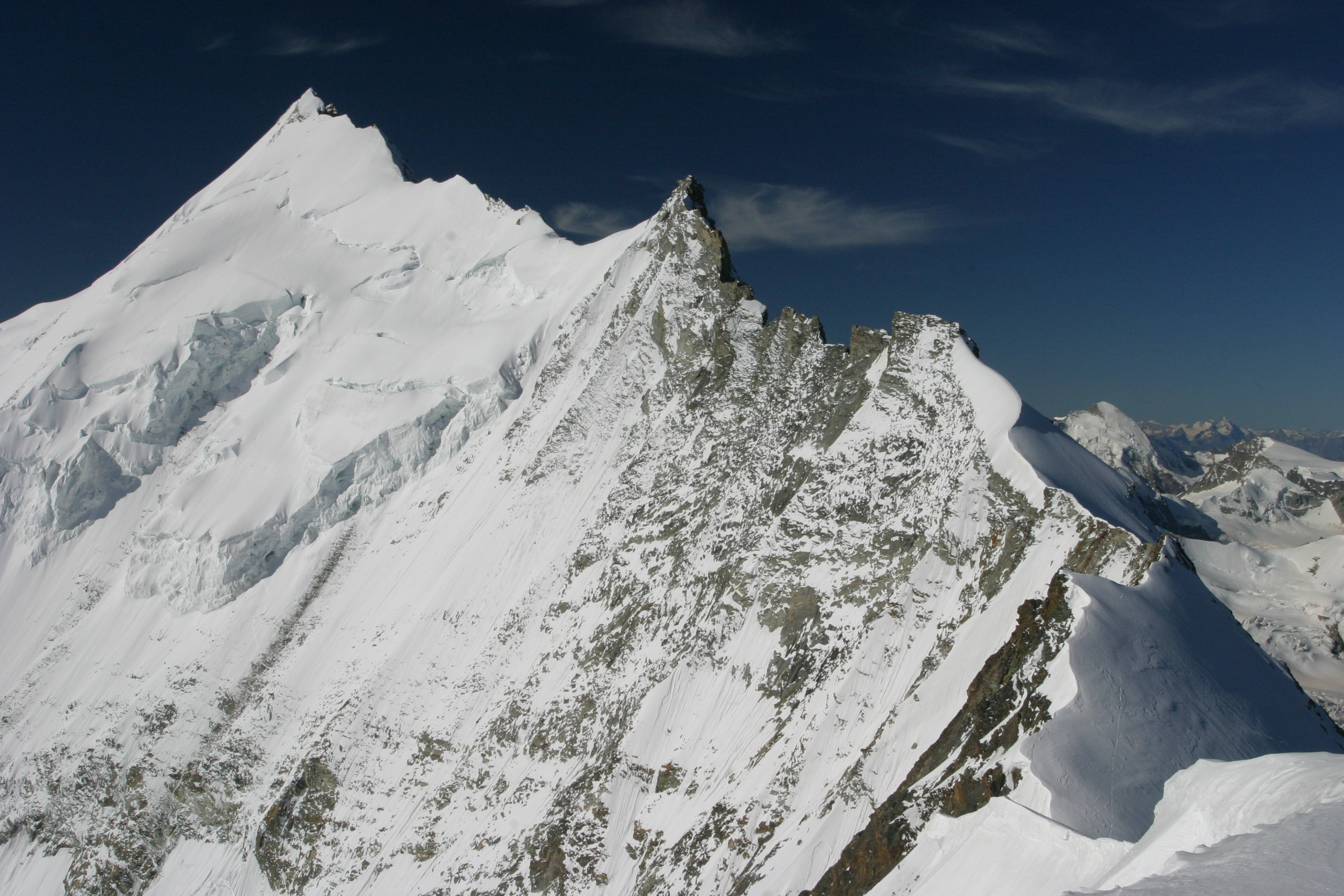
The north ridge seen from the Bishorn, with the Grand Gendarme in the middle

The second ascent, in 1862, was made by Leslie Stephen. Starting with Melchior Anderegg and Franz Biener, of Zermatt. It was from a chalet below the Schallenberg Alp, nearly 2 hours lower than Tyndall's bivouac, that Stephen gained the highest point in 9.5 hours, and returned to Randa in 7.5 hours more, reaching Zermatt the same evening.

In 1877, another route was opened by W. E. Davidson, J. W. Hartley and H. S. Hoare, with guides P. Rubi, J. Juan and A. Pollinger. After climbing part of the lower south-east face above the Schali Glacier, they reached the Schaligrat (south-west ridge) and continued to the summit. The complete ridge (which was considered too difficult and dangerous in its lower part) was first climbed in 1895 by J. M. Biner, A. Imboden and E. Broome. The south-east face was completely climbed in 1906 by Geoffrey Winthrop Young and R.G. Mayor with the guide Josef Knubel of St. Niklaus in the canton Valais.

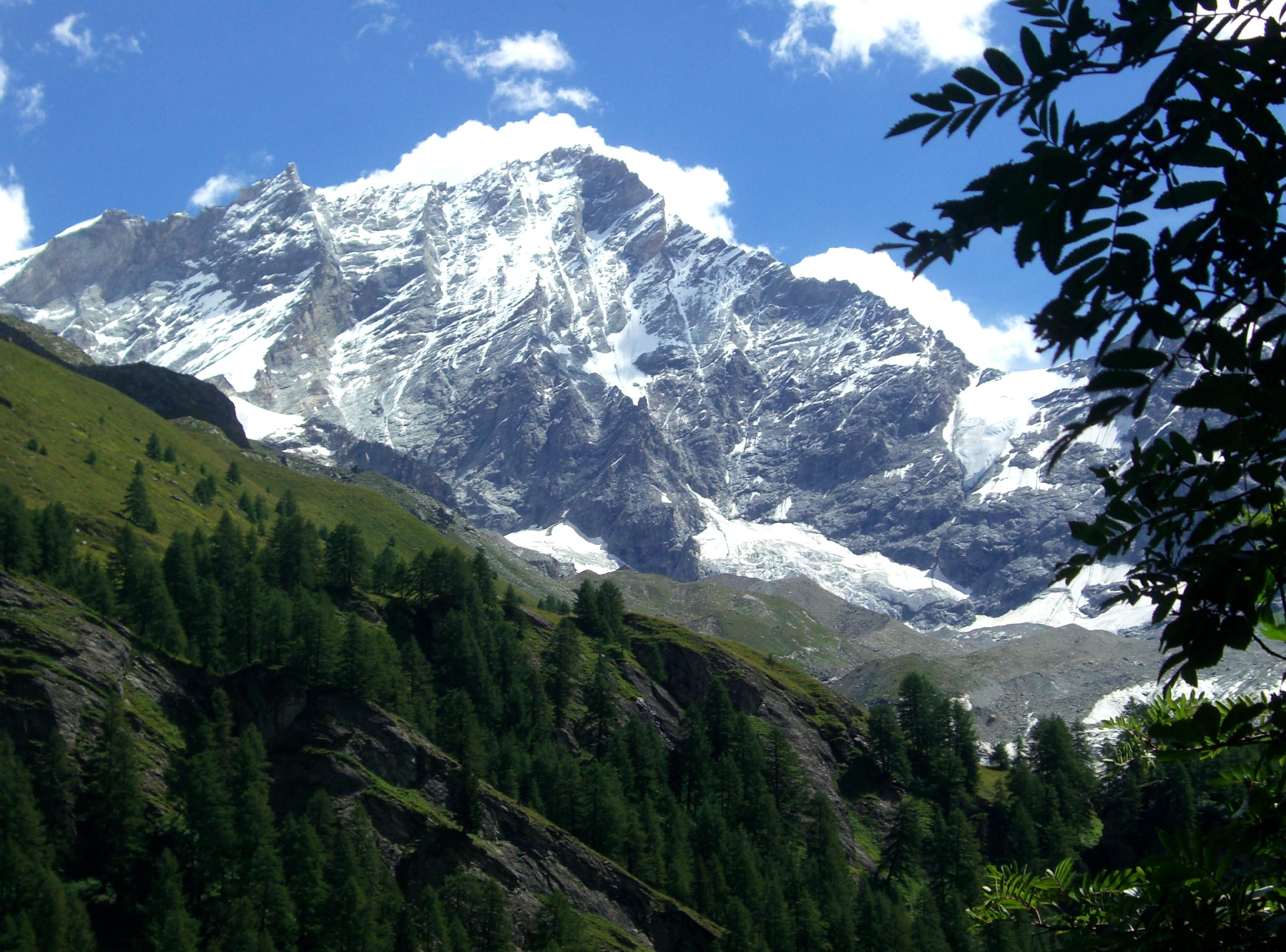
The west face

The glaciated north-east face was first climbed in 1871 by J. H. Kitson with guides Christian Almer and his son. Almer wanted to reach the summit by nine o'clock in the morning while Kitson's wife watched them from the Gornergrat. In fact the difficulties were more serious than expected and they didn't reach the summit before midday. Shortly after, the ascent was repeated by W. A. B. Coolidge and Meta Brevoort. Both expeditions climbed the part of the face below the Grand Gendarme and continued near the north ridge. In 1909 G. W. Young and J. Knubel climbed the face by the central spur.

The west face was first climbed in 1879 by G. A. Passingham with guides F. Imseng and L. Zurbrücken. Other routes on the face were opened in 1883 and 1889. The easiest passage on the east face was found in 1890 by G. W. Young, who climbed the spur under the Grand Gendarme with L. and B. Theytaz by a route known as the Younggrat.

The summit of the Grand Gendarme on the unexplored north ridge was first reached in 1898. One month later, on 21 September 1898, H. Biehly and H. Burgener made the first complete traverse on the north ridge to the summit from the Bishorn.

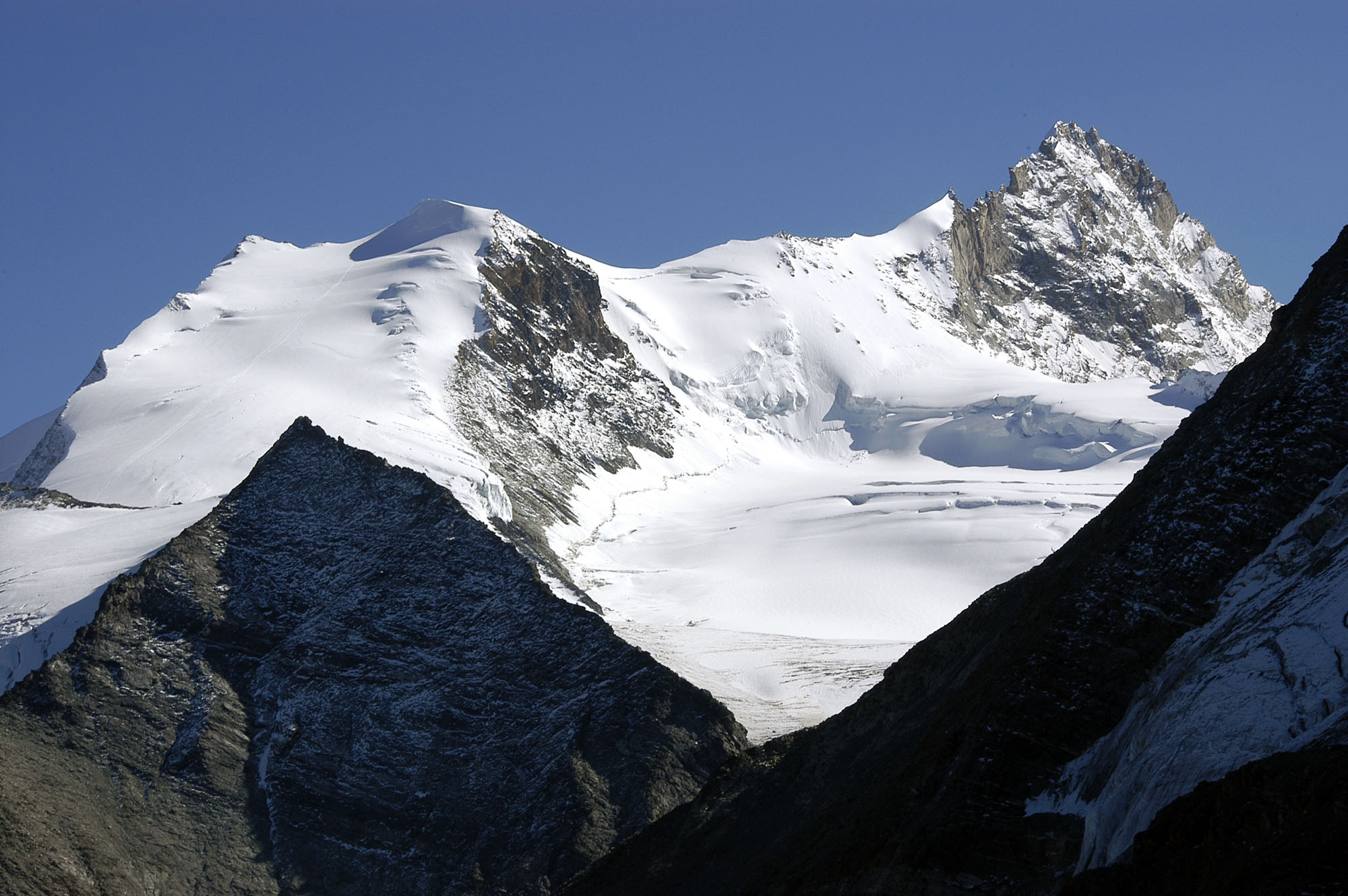
Bishorn and Weisshorn from the Turtmanntal side

In 1888 George Winkler was killed in a fall on the west face. He left Zinal alone on 17 August, without telling others his precise route. The rescue team only found a photo and a hat near an avalanche cone. His body was not found until the summer of 1956, on the Weisshorn Glacier. John Garforth Cockin was also killed making a solo attempt on the south-east face twelve years later.

In 1925 Eleonore Noll-Hasenclever, H. Pfann and H. Trier were caught in an avalanche on the north-east face when they tried to reach the east ridge after interrupting their ascent on the north ridge on account of adverse weather conditions. Pfann and Trier survived, but Hasenclever died from asphyxiation.

== 1983 helicopter crash ==
An Alouette III helicopter from Air Zermatt crashed on a night flight on the Schali Glacier (south of the peak) on 31 July 1983. The helicopter was carrying the pilot, his assistant and a mountain guide who was searching for two missing alpinists. A false alarm made the pilot try to land the helicopter on the glacier at 3,160 m. All the crew were severely injured but the guide and pilot survived. The two missing alpinists were later found dead.

== Climbing routes ==
All the routes are difficult. The normal route starts from the Weisshorn Hut on the east side and goes along the sharp east ridge.

The Weisshorn can be climbed from the Bishorn via the north ridge, departing from the Cabane de Tracuit, above Zinal. The first three hours consist of relatively easy walking across the glacier and lead to the summit of the Bishorn (4153 m). The second part of the ascent is very exposed and takes another five hours, during which the Grand Gendarme must be climbed.

== See also ==
- List of mountains of the Alps over 4000 metres
