= Wolfgang Lentz =

German scholar of Iranian studies

Otto Helmut Wolfgang Lentz (23 February 1900 – 8 December 1986) was a German scholar of Iranian studies.

He specialized in Middle Iranian and New Persian dialects, as well as Turfan fragments, Iranian dialectology, and the interpretation of Zarathustra’s Gathas. From 1918 to 1923, he studied at the Ludwig-Maximilians-Universität München and the University of Göttingen, and was a student of Friedrich Carl Andreas. From 1924 to 1942, he was a research assistant at the Royal Prussian Academy of Sciences in Berlin. In 1950, he became a lecturer in Iranian Studies at the Department of Near Eastern Language and Culture at the University of Hamburg. He later became a professor there. He retired in 1968, and died at the age of 86.
