= James Eccles =

English mountaineer and geologist

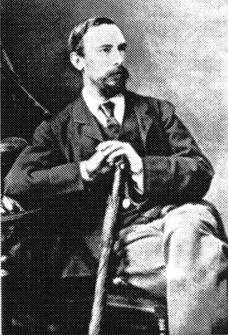
James Eccles

James Eccles FGS (1838 – 6 June 1915) was an English mountaineer and geologist who is noted for making a number of first ascents in the Alps during the silver age of alpinism.

== Life ==
Eccles was born in Blackburn in 1838, the eldest son of Edward Eccles of Liverpool.

He was on the board of Blackburn School, and a minute recording a donation of his to the Blackburn Museum and Art Gallery styles him as "James Eccles, JP" He was elected a member of the Manchester Geological Society in 1866, becoming a vice-president in 1872. He was a Fellow of the Geological Society from 1867 to 1915.

Eccles married in 1863 and moved to London by 1874, where he lived at 15, Durham Villas, Fillimore Gardens, Kensington. A notice in the London Gazette states that on 2 November 1874 Eccles, together with John William Eccles and Robert Langley Wilson, presented a petition to the Lord Chancellor for the winding up of the British Timber Company. He died in 1915, leaving £163,334 in his will.

== Mountaineering ==
=== Alps ===
Eccles began climbing in the Alps in the 1860s and made an early ascent of the Matterhorn on 20 July 1869 from the Breuil side, employing J. A. Carrel and Bich as guides, together with two Chamoniards with whom he would subsequently often climb – the Payot brothers, Alphonse and Michel. Alpine historian C. Douglas Milner called Eccles a climber of "exceptional calibre" and his guides the Payot brothers as "the finest that Chamonix could provide at that time". Eccles had a special interest in the mountains of the Mont Blanc massif – Dumler calls him "that assiduous Mont Blanc explorer" – and made the first ascent of the Aiguille du Plan in July 1871 with Alphonse and Michel Payot. This party also made the first ascent of the Aiguille de Rochefort in 1873 and the Dôme de Rochefort in 1881, the latter via its north-west face.

Eccles made the first ascent of the upper part of the Peuterey ridge, having failed in an attempt on 28 July 1877. Milner writes that Eccles had also failed in an earlier attempt in 1875, intimidated by the Innominata face. Back in London, while walking down the Strand, he saw displayed in a shop window a telephoto showing Mont Blanc and that amphitheatre taken from Crammont. This photo revealed the best exit from the amphitheatre, by the couloir to the Peuterey ridge. Milner implies that photo was the key to success of the climb. On their successful ascent, Eccles's party reached the foot of the climb by crossing the Innominata ridge from the Brouillard glacier, thereby gaining the Frenay glacier. From there they climbed onto the Peuterey ridge above the Grand Pilier d'Angle via a steep couloir, reaching the summit of Mont Blanc de Courmayeur nine hours after leaving their bivouac under Pic Eccles. When Eccles reached the summit of Mont Blanc itself he was appalled by the amount of litter that he found. The party descended to Chamonix in the swift time of three hours and forty minutes.

Pic Eccles at the foot of the Innominata ridge on Mont Blanc is named after him, as is the Eccles bivouac hut below Pic Eccles's summit. Col Eccles on the Brenva side of Mont Blanc is also named after him.

=== Rockies ===
Eccles was one of the first British mountaineers to make ascents of the higher peaks of the Rockies. On 7 August 1878, in a party of eight including surveyor Ferdinand Vandeveer Hayden, topographer A. D. Wilson and Eccles's favourite guide, Michel Payot, Eccles made the second ascent of Fremont Peak (once mistakenly considered the highest peak in the Rockies); he also climbed Wind River Peak in the Wind River Range while accompanying the Hayden Survey, together with A. D. Wilson and Payot. Eccles offers the following description of Wilson:

Wilson, who is a capital mountaineer, led the way at a pace which, just after an imprudently profuse breakfast, was decidedly embarrassing. I struggled on in dignified silence, but Michel's remonstrances if not generally intelligible were sufficiently audible.

—

Eccles attempted to make the first ascent of Grand Teton (an ascent was claimed in 1872 by Nathaniel P. Langford and James Stevenson, but was probably of The Enclosure, a side peak of Grand Teton) in 1878 with Wilson, his assistant Harry Yount, and Payot. Eccles and Payot were unfortunately held up by the disappearance of two mules, and so were unable to accompany Wilson and Yount.

== Geology ==
Eccles described many geological phenomena in the north of England, as well as in the Alps and the Rockies. Of his 1878 trip with Hayden's team he wrote in preface to his "On the Mode of Occurrence of some of the Volcanic Rocks of Montana, U.S.A.":

In the autumn of 1878 I had the good fortune to accompany Dr. Hayden and other members of his survey in some parts of the district referred to; and although I have no intention of giving a detailed description of the volcanic phenomena which were observed, a short notice of the localities whence the specimens were obtained, and of the general mode of occurrence of the rocks, may be of some interest as a supplement to Mr. Rutley's description of their microscopic characters.

—

In 1881 Eccles befriended T. G. Bonney, an alpinist of some repute and professor of geology at University College, London. Eccles provided photography for Bonney's geological volume The Building of the Alps, and accompanied him on trips to the Alps that provided material for Bonney's paper "On the Crystalline Schists and their Relation to the Mesozoic Rocks in the Lepontine Alps." Bonney wrote Eccles's obituary in the Alpine Journal.

As well as writing papers himself, Eccles was also a collector of rare rocks and minerals from places inaccessible to many geologists. For instance, specimens of glaucophane-epidote schist, containing garnet, sphene and diallage collected by Eccles from several feet below the summit of Monte Viso were described in an 1889 paper "On Fulgurites from Monte Viso" by Dr Frank Rutley FGS.

Some of Eccles's collection of rocks, minerals and fossils was given to the Blackburn Museum and Art Gallery. These include a number of fossils from Solenhofen in Germany. The museum also houses Eccles's Devonian orthocones from Wissenbach and several remains of vertebrates from the Kupperschiefer. Eccles donated specimens to the Museum of Practical Geology (now the Geological Museum); one donation, in April 1873, contained two specimens of Productus humerosus/sublaevis from Caldron Low as well as a number of Carboniferous brachiopods (including one from the Isle of Wight) and corals. Eccles gave descriptions of his Productus humerosus specimens (which he collected from 1860 to 1870) in the 1870 issue of Trans. Manchester Geol. Soc., vol. 9, part 3, pp. 1–2.

== Works by Eccles ==
- "Specimens showing the identity of Productus Humerosus," Transactions of the Manchester Geological Society, Vol. 4, p. 1
- "On some instances of the superficial curvature of inclined strata near Blackburn", Transactions of the Manchester Geological Society, Vol. 7, p. 20
- "On the excursion to Holcolme Hill", Transactions of the Manchester Geological Society, Vol. 7, p. 36
- "Denudation of rocks at Sabden", Transactions of the Manchester Geological Society, Vol. 7, p. 61
- "Glacial striae on Kinder Scout grit at Mellor", Transactions of the Manchester Geological Society, Vol. 7, p. 62
- "Starfishes from the Rhenish Devonian Strata", Transactions of the Manchester Geological Society, Vol. 9, p. 51
- "Two dykes recently found in North Lancashire", Transactions of the Manchester Geological Society, Vol. 9, p. 26
- "Carboniferous limestone fossils from Twiston", Transactions of the Manchester Geological Society, Vol. 10, p. 70
- "Relations of the sedimentary and crystalline rocks in the chain of Mont Blanc and its immediate vicinity", Transactions of the Manchester Geological Society, Vol. 10, p. 70
- "The Brouillard and Fresnay glaciers", Alpine Journal, 1878
- "The Rocky Mountain Region of Wyoming and Idaho", Alpine Journal, IX, p. 241 ff
- "On the Mode of Occurrence of some of the Volcanic Rocks of Montana, U.S.A.", Quarterly Journal of the Geological Society, 1881, Vol. 37, issue 1–4, pp. 399–402
- Appendix to "The microscopic characters of the vitreous rocks of Montana, U.S.A." by Frank Rutley FGS, Quarterly Journal of the Geological Society, 1881, Vol. 37, issue 1–4, pp. 391–98
