= Refuge du Plan de l'Aiguille =

Mountain hut in the Mont Blanc massif, France

Coordinates: 45°54′21″N 6°52′59″E

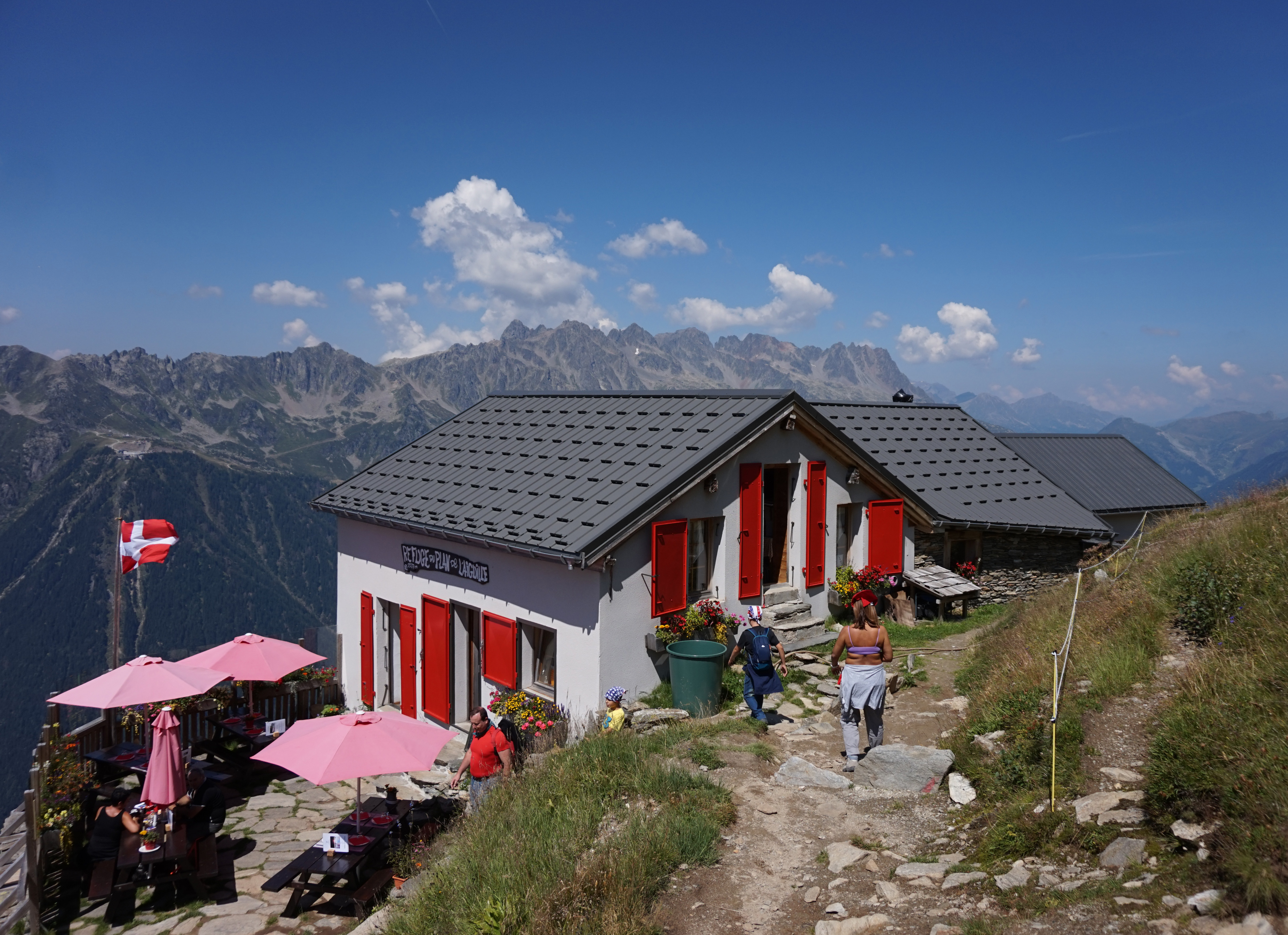
Refuge du Plan de l'Aiguille

The Refuge du Plan de l'Aiguille is a refuge in the Mont Blanc massif in the French Alps. It is located in the department of Haute-Savoie, within the Auvergne-Rhône-Alpes region at an elevation of 2,207 meters. The refuge is equipped with beds, mattresses and sheets, but is not heated. From there, it is possible to climb the Aiguille du Plan or the Aiguille du Midi.
