= John Howard (industrialist) =

English industrialist and inventor

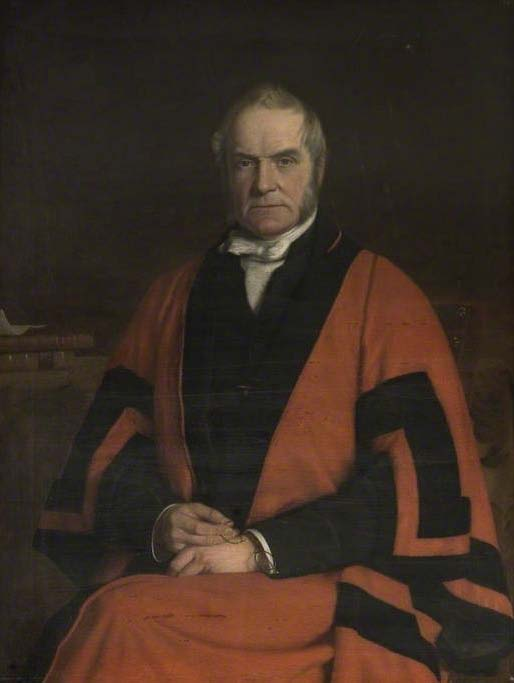
- John Howard in 1860
- Born: 16 March 1791; Bedford, England
- Died: 23 December 1878 (aged 87); Bedford, England
- Education: Bedford Modern School

John Howard (16 March 1791 – 23 December 1878) was an English industrialist, an inventor of agricultural equipment and four times the Mayor of Bedford.

== Life ==
Howard was born on 16 March 1791 in Bedford and was educated at Bedford Modern School. The family of Howard had been settled in Bedford and the neighbourhood for three centuries and at one period was possessed of considerable property. His father was John Moore Howard, Governor of the County Gaol in Bedford. Howard was the grandson and great nephew of two former Mayors of Bedford.

Howard was initially apprenticed to an ironmonger at Olney, Buckinghamshire by the Trustees of Bedford Charity. In 1835 he set up an iron foundry in Bedford which he expanded rapidly. The business was known in Bedford as 'The Firm', as it became the largest employer in the town. Specialising in agricultural machinery, he invented and exhibited a two-wheel plough at the first meeting of the Royal Agricultural Society in 1839 for which he won an award. John Howard retired from business in 1851 leaving his sons James and Frederick as his successors. In the following year the firm commenced the manufacture of steam ploughs. The business established by Howard would later trade as James & Frederick Howard, the two brothers also building the Britannia Iron Works in Bedford in 1857.

Howard died on 23 December 1878. He was the father of Sir Frederick Howard JP DL and James Howard MP. He was also the grandfather of Sir George Farrar, 1st Baronet and via that line the great great grandfather of James Lowther, 7th Earl of Lonsdale. A painting of Howard is included in the BBC's 'Your Paintings' series.
