= John Percy Farrar =

English soldier and mountaineer (1857–1929)

John Percy Farrar DSO FGS
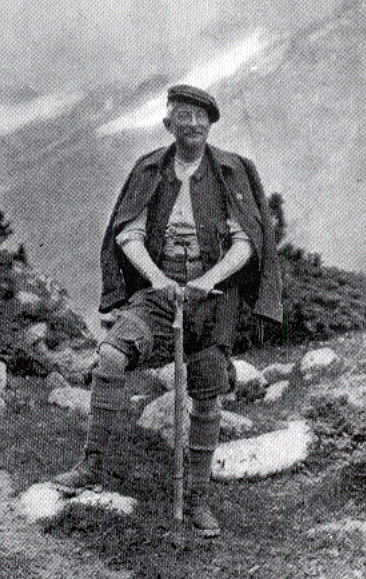
- Born: 25 December 1857; Chatteris, Cambridgeshire, England
- Died: 18 February 1929 (aged 71); Cold Brayfield, Newport Pagnell, Buckinghamshire, England
- Education: Bedford Modern School
- Known for: Member of the Mount Everest Committee; President of the Alpine Club

Captain John Percy Farrar DSO FGS (25 December 1857 – 18 February 1929), also known as Percy Farrar and as J. P. Farrar, was an English soldier and a mountaineer. He was a President of the Alpine Club from 1917 to 1919 and a member of the Mount Everest Committee. Farrar's obituary in The Times stated that he 'was known by repute to every one interested in mountaineering in England and on the Continent, and his personal friends at home and abroad were legion'.

== Family ==
Farrar was born in 1857, the eldest of the three sons of Charles Farrar MD, of Chatteris, Cambridgeshire. He was educated at Bedford Modern School. The second son became Sir George Farrar, Bt., and the third was Sidney Howard Farrar, member of the Institution of Civil Engineers and Fellow of the Geological Society of London. The two younger brothers were partners in the important South African mining company of Farrar Brothers.

Charles Farrar MD of Charteris married Helen, the daughter of John Howard, Esq., of Cauldwell House, Bedford, at Bedford on 5 July 1855. Helen Howard's brothers were Sir Frederick Howard, a Deputy Lieutenant of Bedfordshire, and James Howard MP, the partners in J. and F. Howard Ironfounders, a company which made agricultural machinery at the Britannia Works in Bedford.

== Mountaineering ==
=== Alpinism ===
Farrar started alpine climbing nearly twenty years after the so-called Golden age of alpinism had ended; there were few peaks of any stature left unclimbed, and so Farrar's record is of first or second ascents of particularly notable ridges or lines on mountains that had already been climbed.

First ascents

- South face, Ober Gabelhorn, Pennine Alps, with D. Maquignaz on 28 September 1892
- North ridge, Pollux, Pennine Alps, with Wylie Lloyd and guide Josef Pollinger on 18 August 1893
- North ridge, Wetterhorn, Bernese Alps
- North ridge, Ebnefluh, Bernese Alps

Other ascents

- Second ascent, west face, Weisshorn, Pennine Alps, with Bavarian guide Johann Kederbacher in 1883
- Second ascent, Peuterey ridge, Mont Blanc Massif, to the summit of Mont Blanc with Swiss guide Christian Klucker in August 1893. Klucker had made the first ascent of the ridge the previous week with Paul Güssfeldt, Emile Rey and César Ollier.

In 1924, along with the Japanese climber Yuko Maki and Frank Smythe, Farrar 'made a critical appraisal' of the unclimbed north face of the Fiescherhorn – the precipitous Fiescherwand – in the Bernese Alps, identifying the line that was later used in the first ascent of the north rib by the Swiss in 1926.

President of the Alpine Club from 1917 to 1919, Farrar was also a member of the French alpine group, the Groupe de Haute Montagne.

Pointe Farrar (right) on the Aiguille Verte

Pointe Farrar, a summit on the Grands Montets ridge of the Aiguille Verte, is named after him.

=== Mount Everest Committee ===
Farrar was an original member of the Mount Everest Committee, a joint body composed of Alpine Club and Royal Geographical Society members that was set up to co-ordinate the reconnaissance of the approaches to and possible routes up Mount Everest in 1921. He had been party to the discussions that led to this body's formation – and proposing the mountain as an achievable mountaineering objective – that were held after a talk given to the Royal Geographical Society by Captain J. B. L. Noel in 1919 about his travels in the Everest region. Farrar's role was, amongst other things, to raise funds for the expedition. He also successfully proposed that George Mallory, to whom he had been introduced at one of Geoffrey Winthrop Young's parties at Pen-y-Pass in 1909, go on the initial 1921 British Mount Everest reconnaissance expedition.

Farrar was responsible for deciding which climbers were to be amongst the summit pair. 'In thinking about the best people to make a summit bid, J. P. Farrar, the influential President of the Alpine Club [sic], consulted widely and came to the conclusion that George I. Finch and his brother Maxwell "were two of the best mountaineers we have ever seen" and that they would be his first choice for the summit party.'

=== Writings ===
Farrar wrote many papers on the history of alpinism, including a discussion of Johann Rudolf Meyer's claim to have made the first ascent of the Finsteraarhorn in 1812, and an analysis of the accident on Whymper et al.'s ascent of the Matterhorn in 1865. According to Winthrop Young:

Percy Farrar was probably the strongest single influence which modern mountaineering has known. He wrote no books, but as editor of the Alpine Journal for many years, he raised and kept it at a level of literary and scholarly excellence that could challenge comparison with any more celebrated quarterly. His own writing in it was always in character, virile, brusque, eloquent, strict in censure, but all of a sudden aflame with admiration and generous praise; his farewell apostrophe to his old guide, Daniel Maquignaz, is as noble as it is unconventional.

He also contributed – along with Oscar Eckenstein and J. Norman Collie – to Winthrop Young's 300-page work on mountaineering, Mountain Craft.

== South Africa ==
=== Second Boer War ===
When the Second Boer War of 1899–1902 broke out in October 1899, Farrar and his brother George joined the Colonial Division under General Edward Brabant, with the firm of Farrar Brothers contributing generously to the cost of raising colonial corps.

Farrar served in the Kaffrarian Rifles during the war, attaining the rank of captain. He received the Queen's South Africa Medal with four clasps, and was created a Companion of the Distinguished Service Order. The citation in the London Gazette of 19 April 1901 read: "John Percy Farrar, Captain, Kaffrarian Rifles. In recognition of services during the operations in South Africa". The Insignia were sent to South Africa, returned to England, and presented to Farrar by King Edward VII. Together with his brother George he was Mentioned in Despatches in Lord Roberts' despatch dated 19 April 1901.

=== Politics ===
In the early years of the twentieth century, Farrar and his brother George Herbert Farrar were active in the politics of the Transvaal as leaders of the Progressive Party, the main opposition to Louis Botha.

== Private life ==
Farrar married Mary, daughter of F. Beswick of Queenstown, in 1886.

In 1907, The Anglo-African Who's Who and Biographical Sketchbook gave Farrar's address as Brayfield House, Cold Brayfield, Newport Pagnell, Buckinghamshire.
