= Georgetown (House of Assembly of South Africa constituency) =

- Former constituency for the South African House of Assembly
- Province: Transvaal
- Electorate: 2,618 (1915)

Former constituency
- Created: 1910
- Abolished: 1920
- Number of members: 1
- Last MHA: Hugh McAlister (Un)
- Replaced by: Germiston

Georgetown was a constituency in the Transvaal Province of South Africa, which existed from 1910 to 1920. It covered a part of the East Rand centred on the Georgetown section of Germiston. Throughout its existence it elected one member to the House of Assembly and one to the Transvaal Provincial Council.

== Franchise notes ==
When the Union of South Africa was formed in 1910, the electoral qualifications in use in each pre-existing colony were kept in place. In the Transvaal Colony, and its predecessor the South African Republic, the vote was restricted to white men, and as such, elections in the Transvaal Province were held on a whites-only franchise from the beginning. The franchise was also restricted by property and education qualifications until the 1933 general election, following the passage of the Women's Enfranchisement Act, 1930 and the Franchise Laws Amendment Act, 1931. From then on, the franchise was given to all white citizens aged 21 or over. Non-whites remained disenfranchised until the end of apartheid and the introduction of universal suffrage in 1994.

== History ==
Like most of the East Rand, Georgetown's economy was dominated by mining, and its first MP, George Farrar, was a significant mine owner as well as a military officer. He died in 1915, and was succeeded by Hugh McAlister - both men represented the Unionist Party. In 1920, the seat was abolished and McAlister stood to represent neighbouring Germiston, but lost to the Labour surge on the Rand.

== Members ==
Election	Member	Party
1910	George Farrar	Unionist
1915	Hugh McAlister	Unionist
1920	Constituency abolished	

== Detailed results ==
=== Elections in the 1910s ===
General election 1910: Georgetown
Party	Candidate	Votes	%	±%
Unionist	George Farrar	1,109	55.1	New
Het Volk	H. C. Hull	515	25.6	New
Labour	T. Matthews	388	19.3	New
Majority		594	29.5	N/A
Unionist win (new seat)				

General election 1915: Georgetown
Party	Candidate	Votes	%	±%
Unionist	Hugh McAlister	900	44.4	−10.7
National	W. Olivier	577	28.4	New
Labour	G. Brown	489	24.1	+4.8
Independent	W. H. Andrews	63	3.1	New
Majority		323	16.0	N/A
Turnout		2,029	77.5	N/A
Unionist hold		Swing	N/A	
