= Gabriel Loppé =

French painter, photographer and mountaineer (1825–1913)

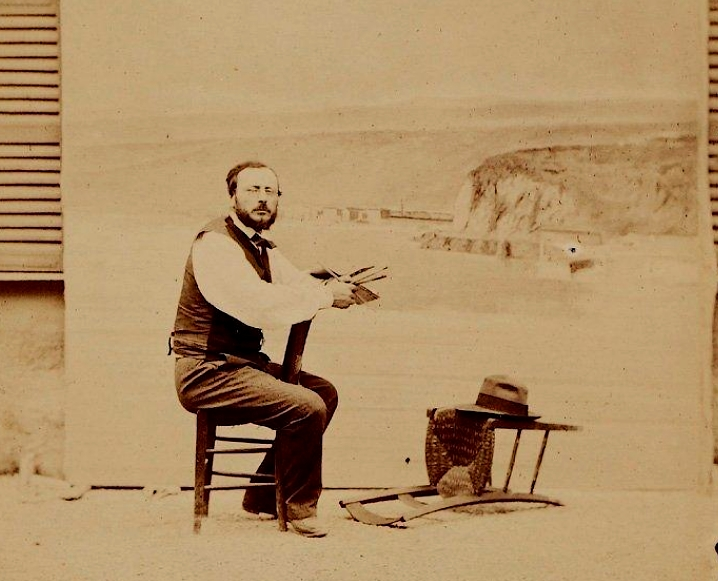
- Photographic self-portrait, circa 1890
- Born: 1825
- Died: 1913 (aged 87–88)
- Known for: Painting, Photography, Mountaineering

Gabriel Loppé (July 2, 1825 – May 19, 1913) was a French painter, photographer and mountaineer. He became the first foreigner to be made a member of the Alpine Club in London.

== Biography ==
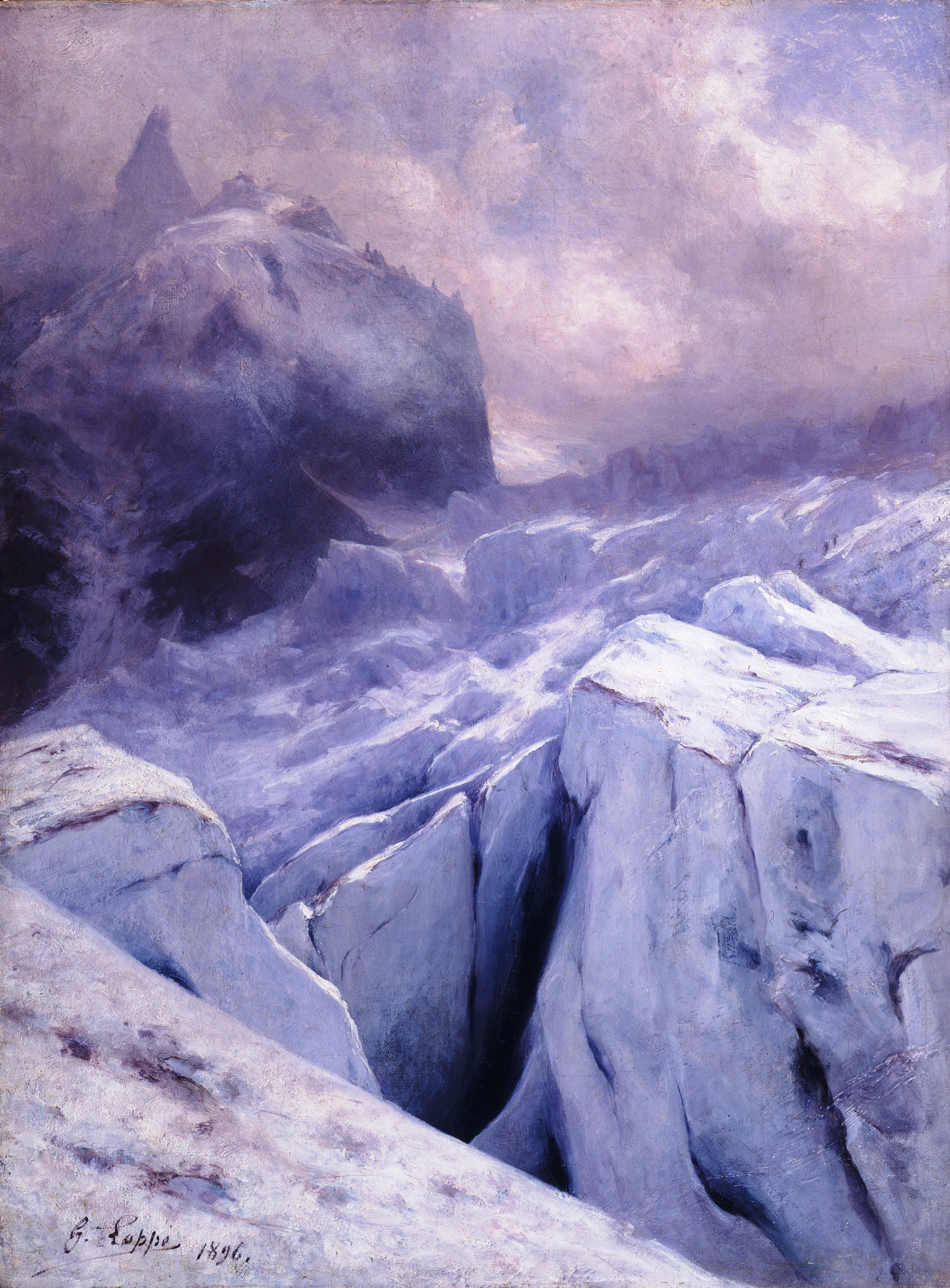
Crevasses on the Glacier du Geant, Mont Blanc Massif, John Mitchell Fine Paintings, London

His father was a captain in the French Engineers and Loppé's childhood was spent in many different towns in south-eastern France.

At the age of twenty-one, Loppé climbed a small mountain in the Languedoc and found a group of painters sketching on the summit. He had found his calling and subsequently went off to Geneva where he met the reputed leading Swiss landscapist, Alexandre Calame (1810 -1864).

Loppé took up mountaineering in Grindelwald in the 1850s and made friends easily with the many English climbers in France and Switzerland. Although he was frequently labelled as a pupil of Calame and his rival Francois Diday, Loppé was almost an entirely self-taught artist. He became the first painter to work at higher altitudes during climbing expeditions, earning the right to be considered the founder of the peintres-alpinistes school, which became established in the Savoie at the turn of the nineteenth century. Together with the first ascent of Mont Mallet in Chamonix’s Grandes Jorasses range, Loppé made over forty ascents of Mont Blanc during his climbing career, which lasted until the late 1890s.

Loppé frequently made oil sketches from alpine summits, including a panorama of the view from the summit of Mont Blanc. His paintings became celebrated for their atmosphere and spontaneity, and he soon found himself taking part in many exhibitions in London and in Paris. By 1896 Loppé had spent over fifty seasons climbing and painting in Chamonix, where some of his work has been exhibited at the Musée Alpin As the valley’s unrivalled ‘Court painter’ his work was in constant demand, with the majority of his pictures going to English climbers and summer tourists. In his later years, Loppé became fascinated with photography and was quite an innovator in this field too. His long exposure photograph of the Eiffel Tower struck by lightning, now in the Musée d'Orsay in Paris remains one of his iconic images.
