= George Farrar =

South African politician (1859–1915)

Sir George Farrar Bt DSO
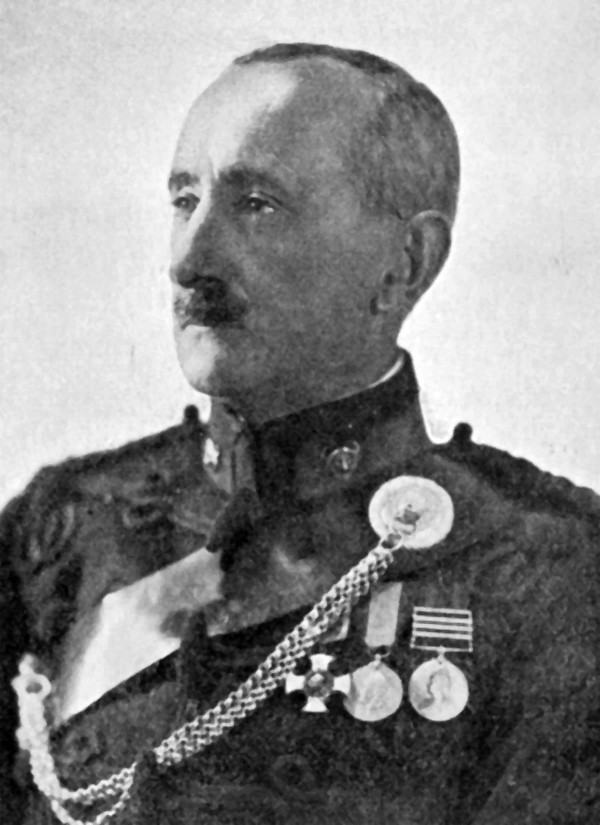
- Born: 17 June 1859; Chatteris, Cambridgeshire
- Died: 20 May 1915 (aged 55); Kuibis, Gibeon, South West Africa

Sir George Herbert Farrar, 1st Baronet, DSO (17 June 1859 – 20 May 1915) was a South African mining magnate, politician and soldier – Colonel and assistant Quartermaster General – Central Force, Union Defence Force, Hon. Colonel South African Light Horse.

== Early life and career ==
Farrar was born in 1859 in Chatteris, Cambridgeshire, the son of Charles Farrar, a Chatteris medical doctor, and Helen Howard, the daughter of John Howard of Cauldwell House Bedford and sister of Sir Frederick Howard of Bedford and James Howard MP of Bedford. George Herbert Farrar was educated at Bedford Modern School after which he joined Howard, Farrar & Co., the engineering business of his uncle, Sir Frederick Howard, travelling to South Africa in 1879 to work at the firm's branches in Port Elizabeth and East London. He was the brother of John Percy Farrar, soldier and mountaineer.

== Later life ==
In 1887, shortly after the discovery of gold on the Reef, he and his brothers established themselves in Johannesburg. Here he became one of the leading figures in the mining sector on the East Rand. His main creation was forming the East Rand Proprietary Mines (ERPM), remaining chairman of the company throughout his life. In 1893 Farrar sold 1,300 claims to the ERPM and received ERPM shares to the value of £705,000 for his claims in the south of Boksburg, excluding Boksburg Lake. Farrar later received further ERPM shares for his claims over Boksburg Lake, and became effectively the controlling shareholder of the ERPM. He was a member of the Legislative Assembly of the Transvaal and Leader of the Opposition. For his part in the Jameson Raid he was sentenced to hang, but the sentence was commuted to a fine of £25,000, paid by cheque by Farrar's brother Sydney.

During the Boer War he raised two regiments of South African Horse, and on 1 December 1900 was appointed Major in the Kaffrarian Rifles. He saw service in the Orange River Colony, took part in the defence of Wepener and saw action at Wittebergen, south of the Orange River. He was mentioned in despatches, and for his service during the war he was awarded the Queen's South Africa Medal with 4 clasps, appointed a Companion of the Distinguished Service Order (DSO), and knighted in December 1902.

Following the end of the war, he was in February 1903 elected chairman of the Johannesburg Chamber of Mines. Farrar was an ardent supporter of the scheme to solve the labour problems of the mines by importing poorly paid Chinese workers on three-year contracts. Despite strong opposition, the plan was implemented in 1904 and over 60,000 Chinese were brought into the country over a period of three years, resulting in even further ethnic tensions on the Reef. With the attaining of autonomy for the Transvaal in 1906, he represented Boksburg East in the Legislative Assembly and was leader of the Opposition. He represented Georgetown in the first parliament of Union of South Africa in 1910–11 and was created a baronet on 2 February 1911. In December 1911 he withdrew from politics and devoted all his time to his enterprises on the East Rand.

With the outbreak of World War I he was visiting England and about to join the staff of General Sir Hubert Hamilton in Belgium, but instead was ordered to German South West Africa as Assistant Q.M-General to Brigadier-General Duncan McKenzie's force with the rank of Colonel. From Lüderitz Bay he was in charge of the restoration of the railway and of supplying the forces with water, critically important in the semi-desert region. On 19 May 1915 while returning from a tour of inspection, his motor trolley collided with a construction train at Kuibis, near Gibeon, and he succumbed to his injuries the following day. He was buried in Bedford Farm Cemetery east of Johannesburg – Bedford Farm was named for his boyhood hometown. Farrarmere, a suburb of Benoni in the East Rand of Johannesburg, South Africa is also named after him as his hunting lodge was located there.

== Marriage ==
He married Ella Mabel Waylen (c.1869–1922) on 3 June 1893 and had six daughters:

- Helen Mabel b. 1894;
- Muriel Frances b. 1896, who married Anthony Lowther, Viscount Lowther;
- Gwendoline b. 1899, stage name Gwen Farrar;
- Kathleen Elizabeth (1907–1964), who married Sir John Fleetwood Fuller, Bt, of Neston Park, Wiltshire; and
- Ella Marguerite (1911–1996).

Although Farrar had no male heirs and his baronetcy became extinct, through his daughter Muriel he was the grandfather of James Lowther, 7th Earl of Lonsdale and the great grandfather of Hugh Lowther, 8th Earl of Lonsdale.

== Sources ==
- Geoffrey Wheatcroft. The Randlords – The Men Who Made South Africa (Jonathan Ball 1986) ISBN 0-86850-135-2
- Standard Encyclopaedia of South Africa (vol 4) (NASOU 1971) ISBN 0-625-00320-9
- John Pinfold. "Farrar, Sir George Herbert, baronet (1859–1915)", Oxford Dictionary of National Biography, online edn, Oxford University Press, Oct 2007 Retrieved 23 Dec 2007

Baronetage of the United Kingdom
| New creation | Baronet (of Chicheley Hall); 1911–1915 | Extinct |
| Preceded by Jameson baronets | Farrar baronets of Chicheley Hall; 2 February 1911 | Succeeded by Balfour baronets |
