= Aiguille Blanche de Peuterey =

Mountain of the Mont Blanc massif in Italy

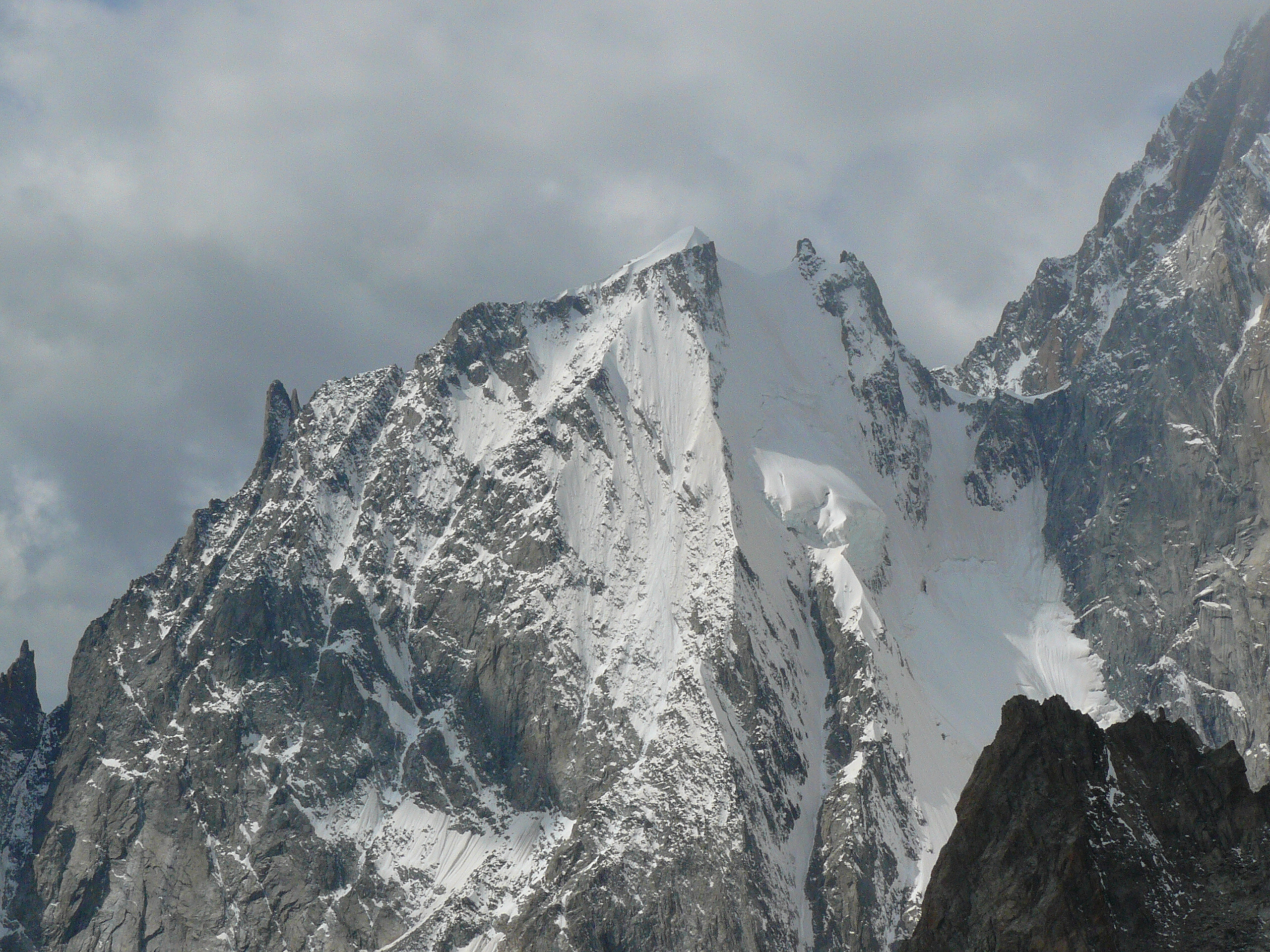
- The north face of the Aiguille Blanche de Peuterey with its three summits, seen from the Pointe Helbronner

Highest point
- Elevation: 4,112 m (13,491 ft)
- Coordinates: 45°49′28″N 6°52′58″E

Geography
- Location within Alps
- Location: Aosta Valley, Italy
- Parent range: Graian Alps

Geology
- Mountain type: Granite

Climbing
- First ascent: 31 July 1885 by Henry Seymour King with guides Emile Rey, Ambros Supersaxo and Aloys Anthamatten
- Easiest route: South-east ridge (D+)

The Aiguille Blanche de Peuterey (White Needle of Peuterey, 4,112 m) is a mountain of the Mont Blanc massif in Italy. It is considered the most difficult and serious of the alpine 4000-m mountains to climb.

There are three tops to the mountain:

- Pointe Güssfeldt (4,112 m)
- Pointe Seymour King (4,107 m)
- Pointe Jones (4,104 m)

The three tops are named after Paul Güssfeldt, Henry Seymour King and Humphrey Owen Jones.

== Ascents ==
The highest point, Pointe Güssfeldt, was first climbed by Henry Seymour King with guides Emile Rey, Ambros Supersaxo and Aloys Anthamatten on 31 July 1885.

In July 1882, Francis Maitland Balfour, a young English professor, lost his life whilst attempting the as-yet-unclimbed summit of the Aiguille Blanche along with his guide Johann Petrus (an uncle of Joseph Knubel). C. D. Cunningham and Emile Rey watched anxiously and silently as the pair set off on the 18th, and it was Rey who was subsequently leader of the search party that brought back their bodies to Courmayeur.

== Peuterey ridge ==
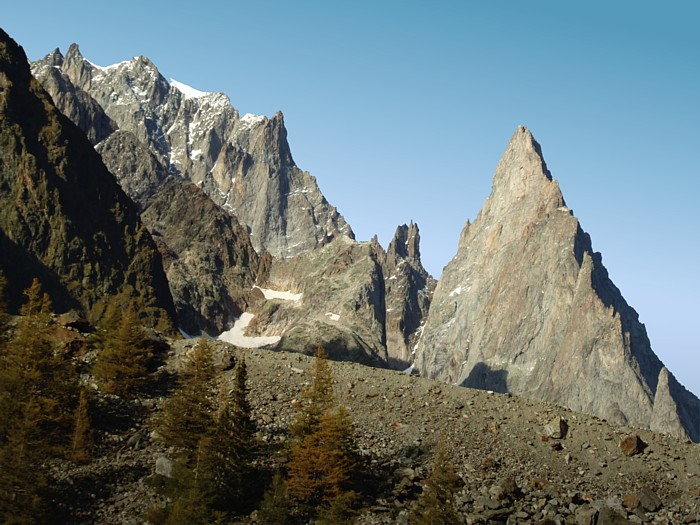
The Aiguilles de Peuterey seen from Val Veny. Aiguille Blanche de Peuterey (extreme left, top), Aiguille Noire de Peuterey (right)

Together with its neighbour – the Aiguille Noire de Peuterey (3,773 m) – the Aiguille Blanche forms part of the Peuterey ridge that leads, via the summit of the Grand Pilier d'Angle, to the summit of Mont Blanc. James Eccles, with guides Alphonse and Michel Payot, made the first ascent of the upper part of the ridge during their first ascent of Mont Blanc de Courmayeur on 31 July 1877. The main ridge itself was first climbed via a couloir on the Brenva face by Paul Güssfeldt with Emile Rey, Christian Klucker and César Ollier on 15–19 August 1893 (the second ascent was a week later by Klucker and John Percy Farrar). The first ascent of the complete ridge including the Aiguille Noire de Peuterey (the Intégrale) was on 28–31 July 1934 by Adolf Göttner, Ludwig Schmaderer and Ferdinand Krobath.

== See also ==
- List of 4000 metre peaks of the Alps
