= Chloé Graftiaux =

Belgian rock climber

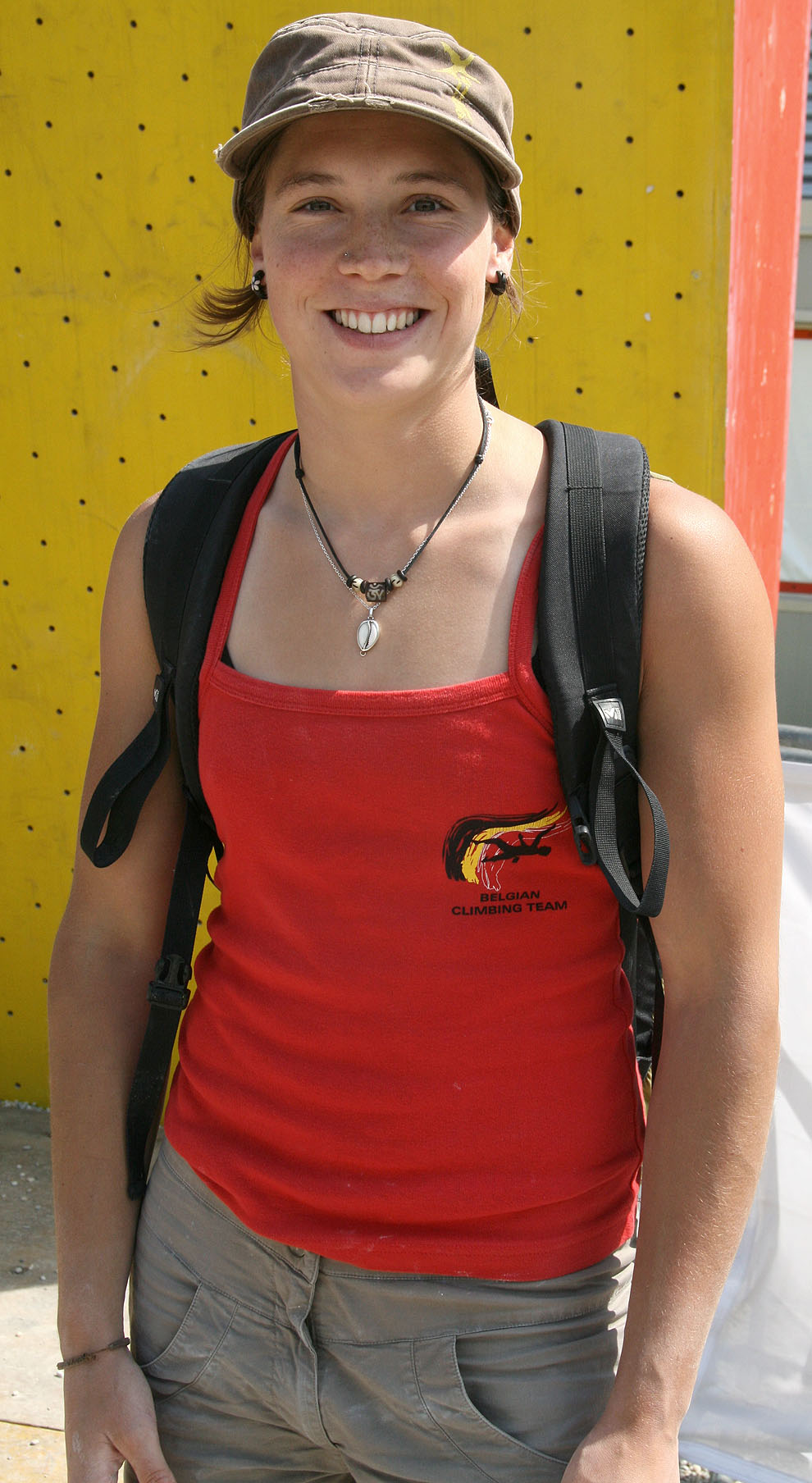
- Chloé Graftiaux, Vienna 2010

Personal information
- Born: 18 July 1987 Brussels, Belgium
- Died: 21 August 2010 (aged 23) Courmayeur, Italy
- Website: www.chloegraftiaux.com

Climbing career
- Type of climber: Competition climbing; Sport climbing; Bouldering; Alpine climbing
- Highest grade: Redpoint: 8b (5.13d); Bouldering: 7C (V9)
- Known for: Bouldering World Cup winner
Medal record
Women's competition climbing
Representing Belgium
IFSC Climbing World Cup
Bronze medal – third place	2010	Boulder
- Updated on 23 January 2022

Chloé Graftiaux (18 July 1987 in Brussels, Belgium – 21 August 2010 in Courmayeur, Italy) was a Belgian competition climber and alpinist who fell to her death on the 3,773-metre (12,379 ft) Aiguille Noire de Peuterey in the Mont Blanc massif, aged 23.

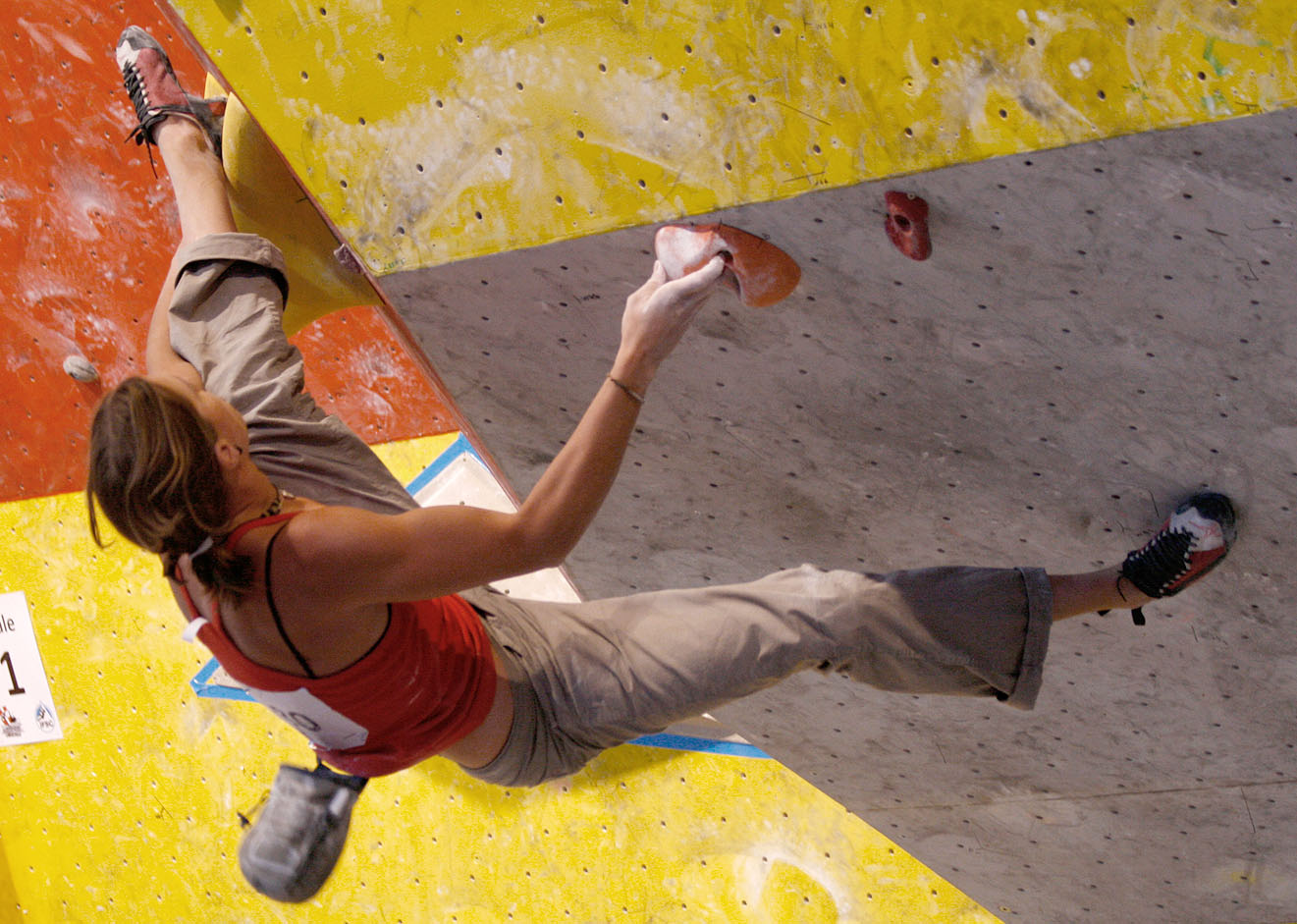
Graftiaux in the Bouldering World Cup 2010 in Vienna.

In the 2010 season of the IFSC Bouldering World Cup, she won gold at the World Cup events in Vail, and Sheffield, and finished third in the overall 2010 standings. Graftiaux was also a multiple lead climbing champion, and had redpointed to 8b (5.13d), and boulder climbed to 7C (V9). Graftiaux was a strong alpinist, climbing to mixed grade M11 and ice climbing to grade WI6, and the French Alpine Club selected her for the 2008-2009 Groupe Excellence Alpinisme. In January 2010, she won the Ice Master-Worldcup ice climbing competition in Valle di Daone in Italy.

On 21 August 2010, she climbed the Aiguille Noire de Peuterey with her climbing partner, Nicolas. While descending the south face of the mountain a boulder came loose. She was not roped up and she fell to her death. In 2011, a non-profit foundation, "Chloé Graftiaux Passion Together", was created to give scholarships to young climbers. In June 2020, Belgian rock climber Anak Verhoeven established Belgium's hardest sport climb and first-ever 8c+/9a route and named it Kraftio in her memory.

== See also ==
- Muriel Sarkany, Belgian rock climber
- Claudine van der Straten-Ponthoz, Belgian-French mountaineer
