= Mont Mallet =

Mountain in France

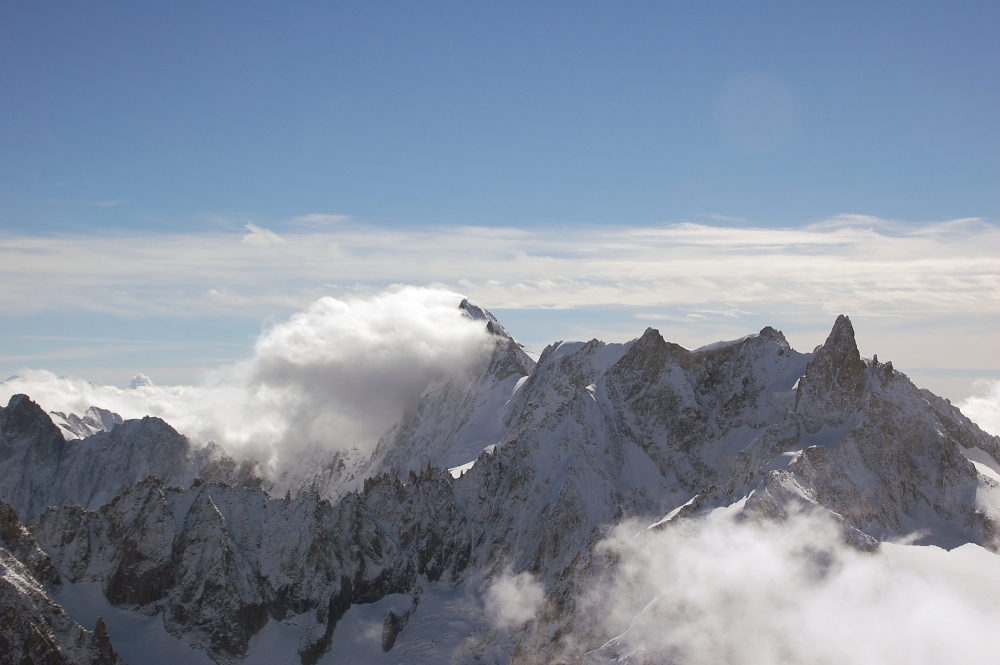
- From left: Grandes Jorasses (behind cloud), Dôme de Rochefort, Mont Mallet, Aiguille de Rochefort and Dent du Géant.

Highest point
- Elevation: 3,989 m (13,087 ft)
- Coordinates: 45°51′55″N 06°57′38″E

Geography
- Location within France
- Location: Haute-Savoie, France
- Parent range: Mont Blanc Massif

Mont Mallet (3,989 metres (13,087 ft)) is a mountain in the Mont Blanc massif in Haute-Savoie, France. It lies on a spur running northwards from the French-Italian frontier ridge, and can be most easily reached from the Aiguille de Rochefort.

Mont Mallet was first climbed on 4 September 1871. The first ascension party consisted of Leslie Stephen, Gabriel Loppé, F. Wallroth, Melchior Anderegg, Cachet and A. Tournier. They reached it via its southern ridge, a route now graded on the French adjectival climbing scale as PD. Its north ridge (graded AD) was first climbed in 1882.
