= Les Périades =

Mountain ridge in France

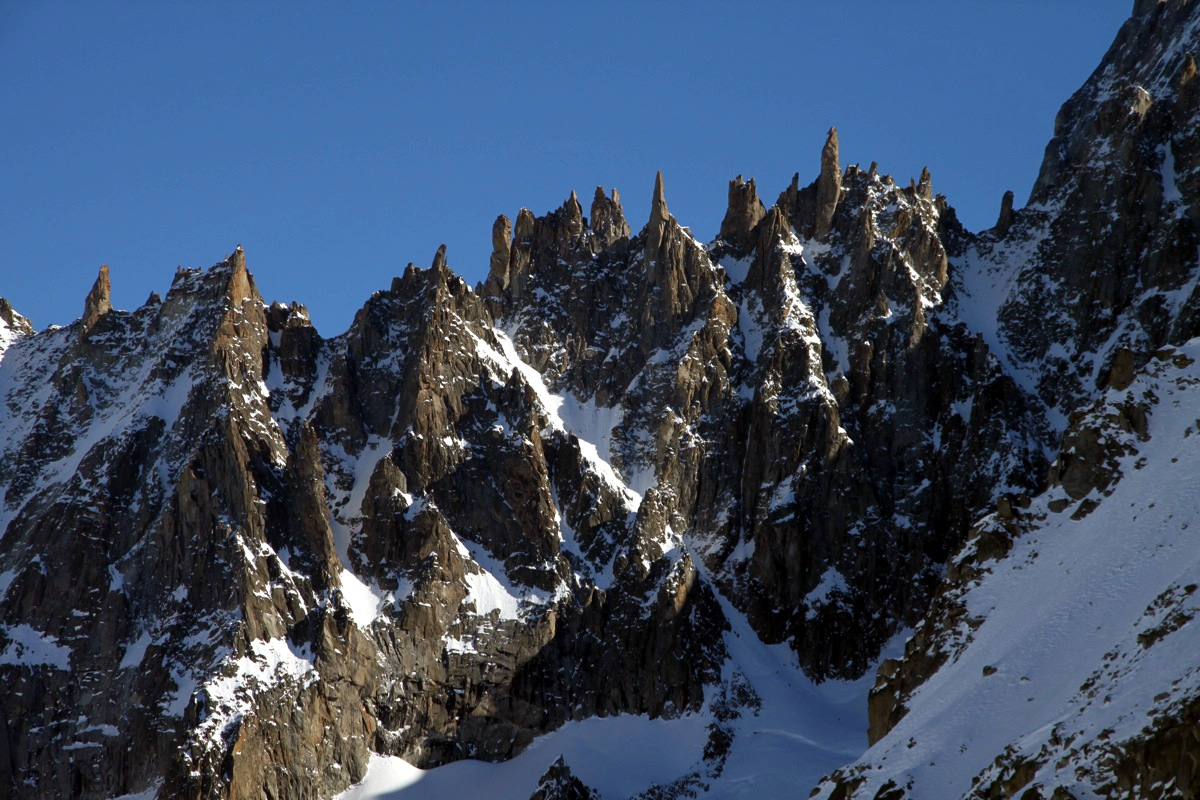
- Pinnacled section of Les Périades and the Brèche Puiseux, seen from the south-west.

Highest point
- Elevation: 3,549 m (11,644 ft)
- Coordinates: 45°52′32″N 06°57′37″E

Geography
- Location within France
- Location: Haute-Savoie, France
- Parent range: Mont Blanc Massif

Grandes Jorasses (centre) with the pinnacled Les Périades ridge running from left to right below it.

Les Périades (highest point: 3,549 metres (11,644 ft)) is a sharp and heavily pinnacled mountain ridge, stretching for over 1,500 metres (0.93 mi) in the Mont Blanc massif in Haute-Savoie, France. It runs in a southerly direction from the Col du Tacul to the Col du Mont Mallet. Its highest point is Pointe Cupelin (3,549 metres (11,644 ft))

Principal points along the crest of Les Périades, from south to north:

- Pointe Auguste Cupelin - 3549 m
- Pointe 3517 m
- Pointe de la Fenêtre - 3507 m
- Pointe de Sisyphe - 3460 m
- Pointe Alfred Simond 3457 m
- Pointe Nini - 3455 m
- Pointe Francois Simond - 3493 m
- Pointe des Périades (or Pointe Paul Perret) - 3503 m

Les Périades are divided into three parts by the Brèche Puiseux (or Brèche Supérieure des Périades) and by the Brèche des Périades.

A bivouac hut (known as the "Bivouac Paul Chevalier alle Périades") was installed near Pointe de Sisyphe in 1928 at a height of 3,455 metres (11,335 ft). It eventually became the property of the French Alpine Club, and was renovated in 1996. The site collapsed in 2019 during the summer heatwave, which caused the previously frozen ground to become unstable. It was replaced in 2020, following a public fund-raising campaign, and can accommodate three or four people.
