= Aiguille Noire de Peuterey =

Mountain of the Mont Blanc massif in Italy

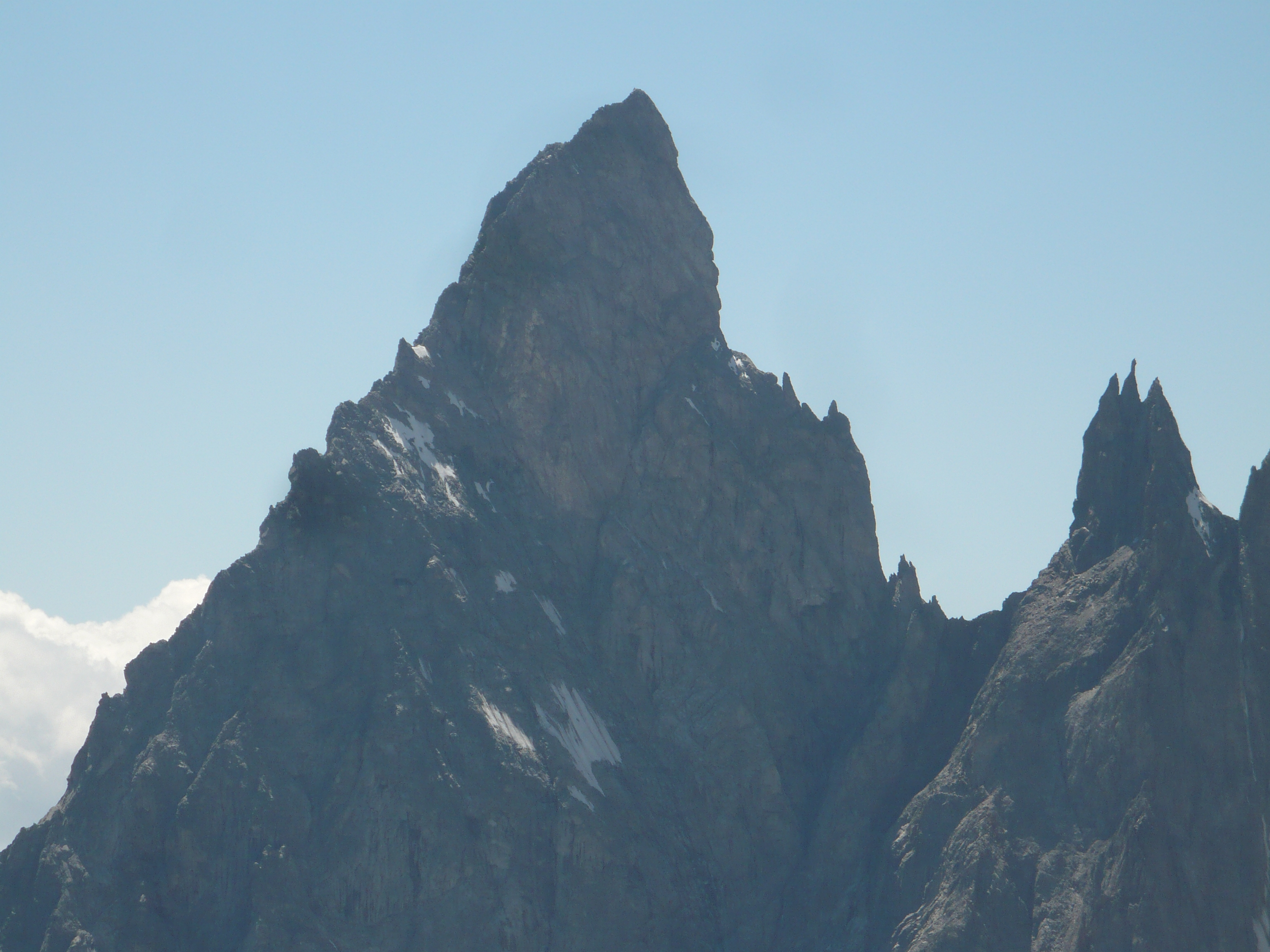
- East face of the Aiguille Noire de Peuterey, with les Dames Anglaises (right)

Highest point
- Elevation: 3,773 m (12,379 ft)
- Prominence: 274 m (899 ft)
- Isolation: 0.72 km (0.45 mi)
- Listing: Alpine mountains above 3000 m
- Coordinates: 45°48′54″N 6°53′37″E

Geography
- Location: Aosta Valley, Italy
- Parent range: Mont Blanc massif, Graian Alps

Geology
- Mountain type: Granite

Climbing
- First ascent: 5 August 1877 by Lord Wentworth with J.B. Bich and Emile Rey
- Easiest route: East ridge (AD-) from the refuge Borelli

The Aiguille Noire de Peuterey (Black Needle of Peuterey, 3,773 m (12,379 ft)) is a mountain of the Mont Blanc massif in Italy, forming part of the Peuterey ridge to the summit of Mont Blanc with its higher neighbour, the Aiguille Blanche de Peuterey.

The best-known route on the mountain is the south ridge (TD). Along the ridge are the tops of the Pointe Bifida, Pointe Welzenbach 3,355 m (11,007 ft), Pointe Brendel 3,499 m (11,480 ft), Pointe Ottoz, and Pointe Bich 3,753 m (12,313 ft). The route was first climbed by Karl Brendel and Hermann Schaller, on 26 and 27 August 1930; it remains one of the great classic rock routes in the massif.

The first ascent of the complete Peuterey ridge including the Aiguille Noire de Peuterey (the Intégrale) was on 28–31 July 1934 by Adolf Göttner, Ludwig Schmaderer and Ferdinand Krobath. On 21 August 2010 23-year-old Chloé Graftiaux, a leading Belgian sport climber, fell to her death on the mountain.

== Photo gallery ==
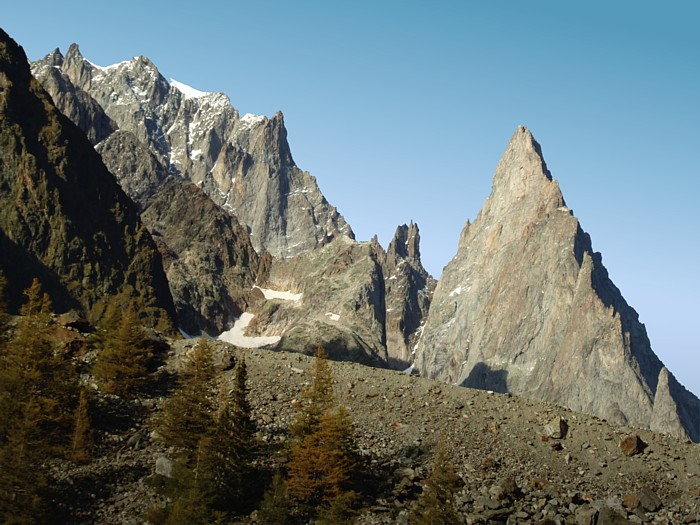
The Aiguilles de Peuterey seen from Val Veny. Aiguille Blanche de Peuterey (extreme left, top), Aiguille Noire de Peuterey (right)
