= James & Frederick Howard =

English agricultural equipment manufacturer

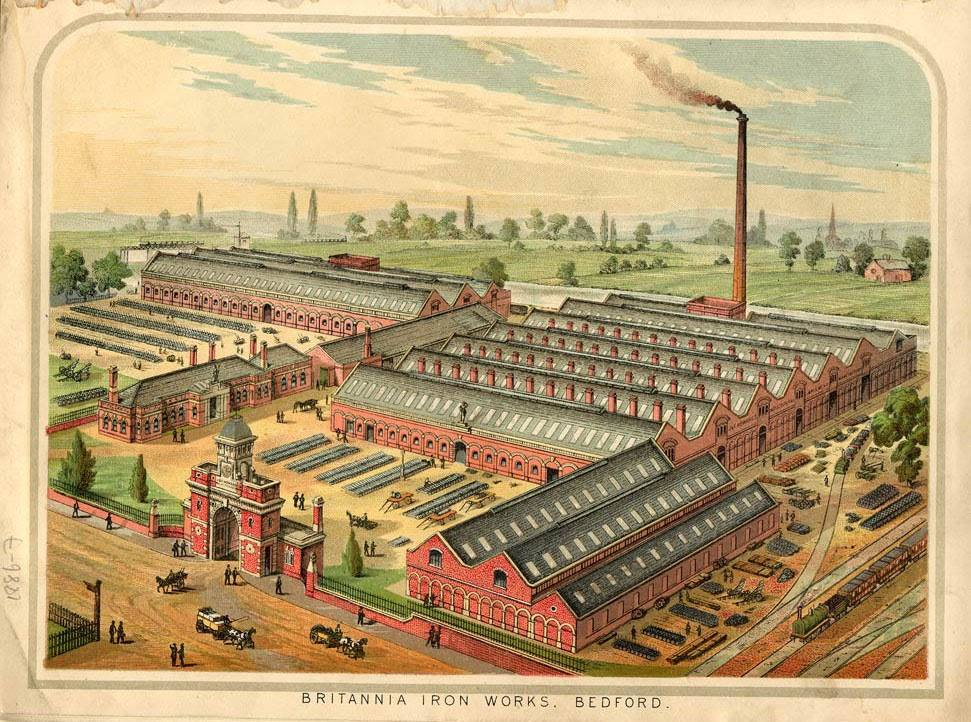
James & Frederick Howard, 1887

James & Fred Howard of Britannia Ironworks, Bedford, later known simply as Howards, were one of the largest English makers of agricultural equipment, steam traction engines, and light railway equipment. At The Great Exhibition of 1851 they exhibited a range of horse-drawn implements. After World War I, Howards became part of AGE, Agricultural & General Engineers, along with many of the other British makers of similar machinery.

== History ==
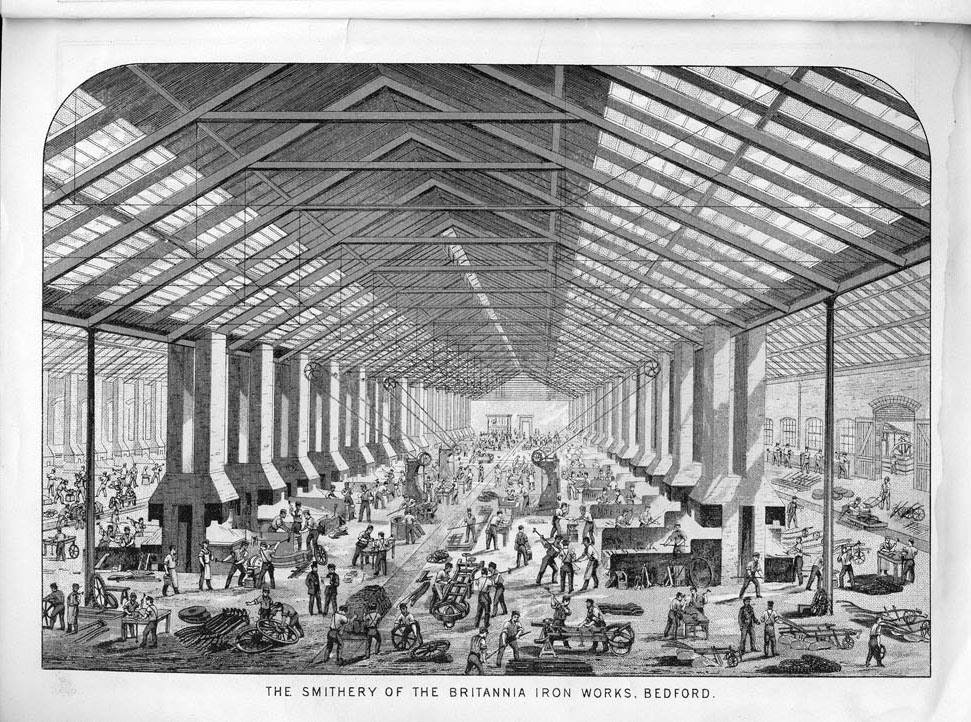
Britannia Ironworks Smithery 1887

The original ironmongery business was created by John Howard (1791 - 1878) in 1813. In 1837 he thanked his patrons for 24 years of support and informed them of his move to new premisies, formerly the Barley Mow Inn in the High Street. He invented and patented a two-wheel plough, which won large numbers of awards in 1841 and in successive years, and they also had prize winning harrows (patented by W. Armstrong and John Howard), and a wide range of other agricultural implements. By 1845 his works address had changed to Britannia Foundry, Bedford, although the large works built on the 20-acre site that became known as Britannia Ironworks is reported not to have been built until c1857, so the original Britannia foundry was located elsewhere. The Britannia works was to grow to become the biggest employer in Bedford (700 employees in 1871). Howard's award-winning ploughs and harrows were exported around the world. John Howard announced his retirement in 1851 at which time his sons James and Frederick took over. Business continued to boom, and the business grew to encompass steam ploughing.

James Howard died in 1889, and Sir Frederick Howard died in 1915 aged 87 (he was knighted in 1895), and in 1919 the business was taken over by Agricultural & General Engineers Ltd.

In the great depression of 1932 A.G.E. reported huge losses and on 15 February 1932, Howards closed along with several other A.G.E. businesses. The 500 employees only received 30 minutes notice. A new company, the Britannia Iron & Steel Works Ltd, was formed late in 1932 making pipe fittings. The Howard manufactured works rail shunter continued to work the site until it was replaced in 1965.

The drawings and patents were purchased by locomotive manufacturer F. C. Hibberd & Co. From their new Park Royal works in London they produced locomotives that closely followed the Howard designs, both 2.5 ton narrow gauge, and 7, 10 and 12 ton standard gauge.

== Agricultural Equipment ==
The Howard patent plough was a great success and made in huge numbers. However a diverse range of different types of agricultural equipment was made, for example an advert in 1891 lists their famous ploughs and harrows plus disk harrows, horse rakes, mowers, reapers, cultivators, land-rollers, hay presses, straw trussers, grass harrows, horse hoes, vine cultivators, sheaf binders, scarifiers, clod crushers, straw presses, plantation wagons, mining plant and portable railway.

With the advent of steam power on farms, Howard started producing the ploughs and winding gear for steam ploughing, later including portable engines to drive the gear, and eventually ploughing engines able to carry out many other duties. In 1895 they added a portable oil engine intended to drive machinery, also available as a stationary engine.

== Traction engines ==
Howard traction engines were introduced in the 1870s. They are recognisable by their distinctive placement of the steam engine behind the boiler, rather than on top as for the far more common overtype. Howard claimed this reduced the heavy strain on the boiler and resulted in less wear and leakage, it also meant it was more compact for shipment, and with the working parts hidden from view it was "less likely to frighten horses". This gives them an unusually long and low appearance, with the flywheel set particularly low. This also requires the provision of a steam dome atop the boiler, an unusual arrangement for an English engine. (Note: In most English engines, the casting for the cylinder itself forms a steam dome.) Although usually plain in appearance and painted black, with little ornamentation compared to the later Edwardian engines, Howards carried very large brass nameplates on their boiler sides and smokebox door reading "James & Fred^{k} Howard. Bedford. England".

They also built ploughing engines. Unlike the better-known Fowlers, the Howard used a pair of winding drums. This allowed a single engine and an anchored return pulley to plough, rather than the Fowler system that used a pair of engines, each one pulling alternately. The two drums were too large to fit in the usual position beneath the boiler and so were moved to a horizontal axle behind the engine's scuttle, with a pair of sheaves beneath the boiler to guide the cables.

In 1903 Howard added a 5-ton steam wagon to their product list. This followed conventional lines with a vertical boiler sited at the front.

== Railway and railway locomotives ==
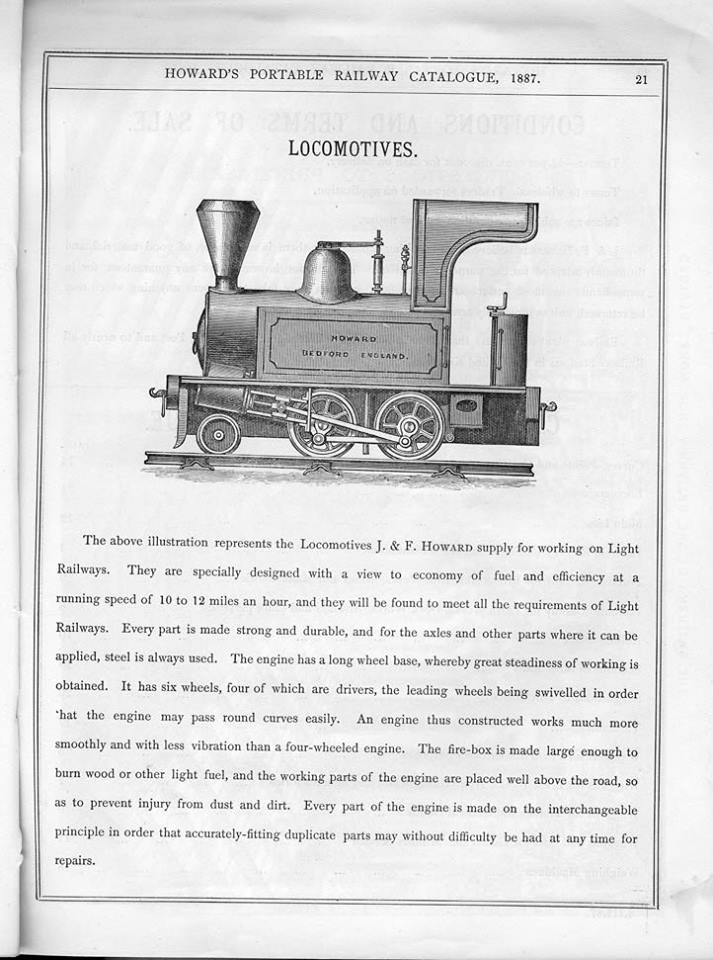
J&F Howard Catalogue 1887

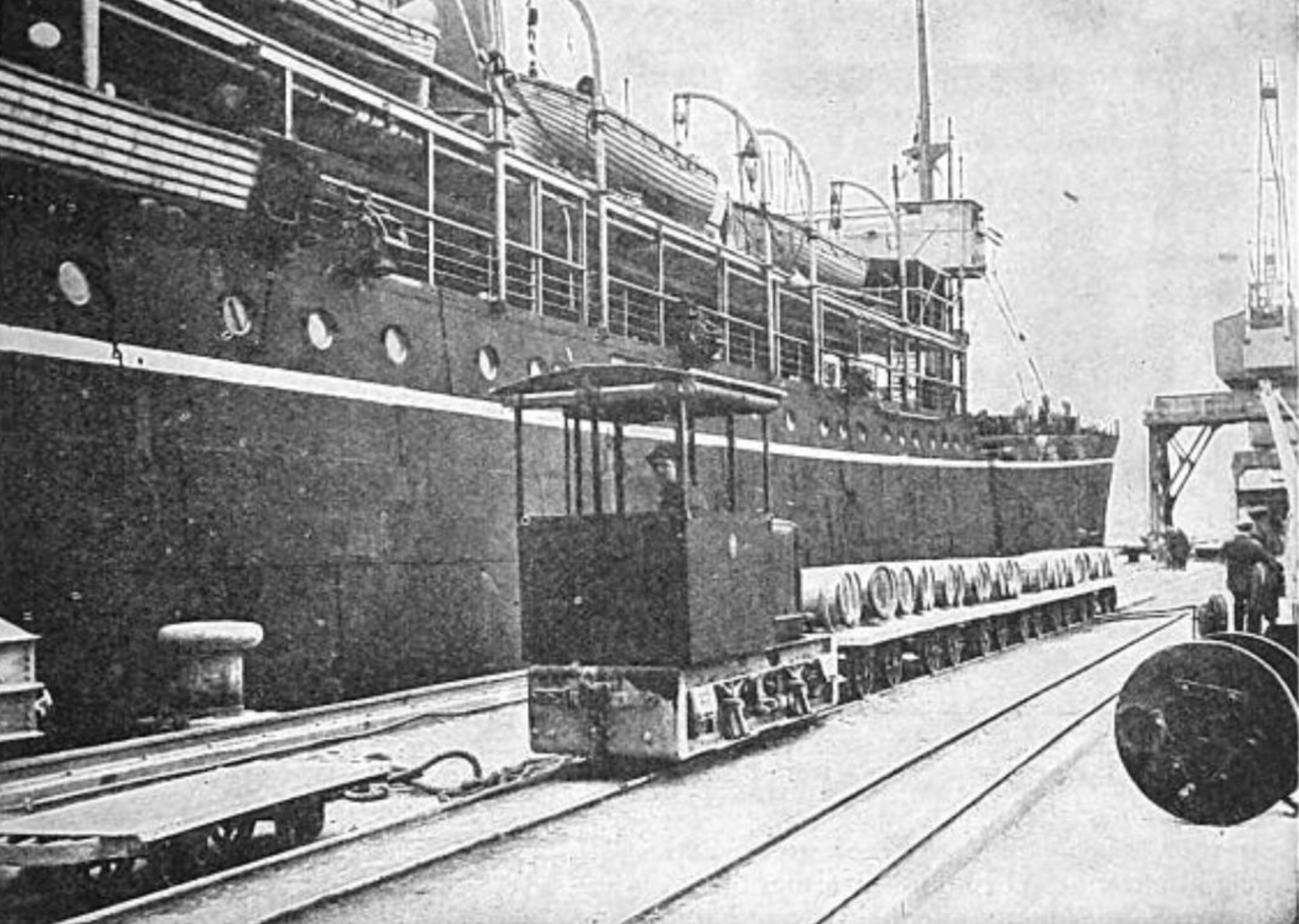
A narrow gauge locomotive built by Howards at work at Beaver's Wharf, Northfleet

In 1885 Howard added portable railway equipment into their portfolio, and the link to agriculture is that this was targeted at plantations (e.g. tea, coffee, sugar). They listed lightweight track sections that could be rapidly laid and connected without bolts, and plantation wagons. To maximise the market for these they described them as being suited to mining, quarries, etc. as well. By 1890 they claimed to produce wagons of all kinds, and their 1887 catalogue also listed a steam locomotive.

In 1921 Blackstone & Co made a narrow gauge petrol rail locomotive using their new 3-cylinder 25 hp engine. This was a 3 to 4 ton locomotive (depending on the gauge required), and was marketed by James & Frederick Howard.

In 1923, Howards started building internal combustion railway locomotives. The survivors include the standard gauge Howard works shunter, made in 1926, which remained at the Britannia works even after Howard's had failed, being replaced only in 1965 when it moved to the Bluebell Railway where it was used for light shunting until about 1969. It has since been restored. The early narrow-gauge Howard locomotives used Morris petrol engines, but they were later available with Blackstone's oil engines. The larger shunters were available in 7 ton size with 45-57 hp four cylinder Dorman engine, and 10 to 12 tons with 61-80 hp six cylinder Dorman 6JUL petrol engine. From the works numbers of 3 surviving locos, 957 in 1926, 965 in 1930, and 984 in 1931 - it would appear the locomotives were only made in small numbers.

== Surviving examples ==
While Howard ploughs survive in reasonable numbers, their other agricultural implements such as the zig-zag harrow are less common. Their steam and internal combustion engines are much rarer, with only a handful of known survivors.

- Works Nº201 of 1872. A two-speed 9nhp traction engine, originally sold to Australia.

Re-imported and restored by Tom Varley in 1980 and numbered 24. Sold after his death to Peter Rigg of Todmorden. Now carries the name Brittania

- Ploughing engine Works Nº110 of 1876, UK Registration AP9197
- Standard gauge locomotive No 957 of 1926. a 4-wheel petrol mechanical drive (4wPM) which was used at Howard's Britannia works as a shunter, and remained there after the 1932 failure of the company, working until 1965 after which it was preserved on the Bluebell Railway. Engine is a Dorman 4-JUD.
- Standard gauge locomotive No 965 of 1930. a 4-wheel petrol mechanical drive (4wPM) locomotive preserved on the Ribble Steam Railway. This has a 6-cylinder Dorman 6JUL side-valve petrol engine, and a 3-speed Howard gearbox. It worked at the Ford Paper Works in Sunderland until preserved in 1972.
- 2 foot gauge locomotive No. 984 built in 1931. The only remaining narrow-gauge locomotive built by Howards.
