= Diallage =

Inosilicate mineral

General
- Category: Minerals
- Formula: Ca(Mg,Al)(Al,Si,Al_{2})SiO6
- Crystal system: Monoclinic

Identification
- Color: Green, Greenish gray, Yellowish green, Brown, Brownish
- Crystal habit: Lamellar Tabular
- Cleavage: Perfect on {???}
- Fracture: Conchoidal, Uneven
- Mohs scale hardness: 4 - 6
- Luster: Metallic
- Streak: White
- Diaphaneity: Opaque, Translucent
- Density: 3,2 - 3,35
- Ultraviolet fluorescence: None
- Melting point: High melting point (exact melting point unspecified)
- Solubility: Insoluble in acids

Diallage is an inosilicate, meaning it is a chain silicate, and is a part of the pyroxene group. Diallage is a junction between augite and diopside, just like fassaite. It was named in 1801 by René Just Haüy. Its name derives from the Greek word diallaghé (meaning change, transform, difference), as its composition differs from that of the other minerals in the pyroxene group. It is a fairly common mineral, and is cheap.

== Properties ==
Diallage is typically an opaque mineral, but translucent specimens can occur. This mineral forms tabular crystals, meaning the crystals are flatter, and slightly longer than wide. These crystals occur as lamellar masses, meaning the crystals stack on top of each other, and form big chunks. It is a heavy, hard mineral, however, it is fragile. It is not soluble in any acid. According to the Von Kobell-scale, its melting point is high, though the exact melting point of said mineral is not specified. Due to alteration, diallage can grow spots on its surface, which are made out of smaragdite (the green variety of amphibole). It is not surprising, due to both minerals being inosilicates. This alteration is caused by metamorphosis. The spots can also be caused by uralite, another variety of amphibole, as both of them are an alteration product of the diallage. This mineral can also be found interlaminated with bronzite as well, other than smaragdite and uralite. The metallic luster of the mineral is due to something known as schillerization, where diallage goes under an alteration which makes it earn its metallic luster it is known of. When the crystal forms, there are secondary minerals, which are hydrated oxides, such as opal, goethite and limonite. These become microscopic inclusions as diallage grows over the secondary minerals, and these minerals partly or fully fill the cavities. Thanks to these minute inclusions, the mineral reflects the light so that it creates a metallic luster, or the effect commonly known as "schiller".

== Identification ==
If inspected without the use of tools, it is easy to confuse diallage with other members of both the orthopyroxenes and the clinopyroxenes. For example, metalloidal diallage can easily be confused with hypersthene (hence the pseudohyperstene being diallage's synonym), however it is easy to distinguish them apart just by looking at its optical properties, its luster and its cleavage. Without having proper equipment, diallage could be distinguished from other members of the class due to having a metallic luster and thin foliated structure.

== Occurrences ==
Diallage is commonly found in association with other members of the augite series within the clinopyroxenes, such as with fassaite. It can also be found with other minerals, such as olivine, biotite and hornblende. It is a deep-seated igneous (also known as magmatic) mineral, and it is intrusive, meaning it crystallizes below the Earth's surface, and the slow cooling allows the crystallization to occur. It usually grows in basic igneous rocks like gabbros and peridotite, and in low-grade metamorphic rocks such as metagabbros. Furthermore, diallage is an essential constituent of gabbros. It can also occur in serpentines, but rarely ever in schists and basalt.

== Localities ==
Typically, this mineral can be found in Europe, and is mostly common in Italy. In Romania, it can be found in the area of Svinița in gabbros, and in peridotites near Szarvaskő in Hungary. It can be found basically anywhere in Italy where there are basic igneous rocks and/or low-grade metamorphic rocks. It can also be found in the western region of the Alps, around Sondalo, however these specimens are generally lower quality ones. Higher grade specimens occur in Trento, and in a few spots of the Ligurian Apennines. These spots include Passo del Bracco, the mines of Acquafredda and Bargone, next to Sestri Levante. Another occurrence is in the Tuscan-Emilian Apennines, in Sasso Puzzino and Serra del Zanchetto, near Bologna. Other than these, diallage also occurs in Austria, Germany, and in the Polish Silesia as well.

== Controversies ==
Although it was supposed to be a legitimate variant of diopside, gemdat.org claims diallage to be a 19th-century name variant of some stones of the amphibole and pyroxene groups. The site also claims that most specimens under this name are either hypersthenes or diopsides. However, pseudohyperstene is also a synonym for diallage, therefore it is not a hypersthene, as pseudo means not genuine. Furthermore, opinions whether it is a distinct species or a variant differ. Even the reason for why it's a variant, or which mineral's variant it is, differs. Mindat claims it is a variant since the parting is different. Britannica claims diallage to be either of the pyroxenes augite and diopside. Furthermore, the formula of the mineral differs from site to site. On mindat.org it has the formula of CaMgSi_{2}O_{6}. Furthermore, in the "Minerali Collection" journal, diallage is given the following formula: Ca(Mg,Al)(Al,Si,Al_{2})SiO_{6}. The Merriam-Webster dictionary stating it has a Mohs of 4 and a gravity of 3.2 - 3.35, adds confusion to the situation.
