= Frank Rutley =

Frank Rutley (14 May 1842 – 16 May 1904), an English geologist and petrographer, was born in Dover on 14 May 1842. He was educated partly in Bonn, but his interest in geology was kindled at the Royal School of Mines, where he studied from 1862 to 1864. He then joined the army, and served as lieutenant until 1867, when he became an Assistant Geologist on the Geological Survey.

Working in the Lake District, Rutley began to make a special study of rocks and rock-forming minerals, and soon qualified as acting petrographer on the Survey. For several years be worked in this capacity at the museum in Jermyn Street; he described the volcanic rocks of East Somerset and the Bristol district in 1876, and wrote special memoirs on The Eruptive Rocks of Brent Tor (1878) and on The Felsitic Lavas of England and Wales (1885).

Rutley was the author of an exceedingly useful little book on Mineralogy (1874; 12th ed., 1900); also of The Study of Rocks (1879; 2nd ed., 1881), Rock-forming Minerals (1888), and Granites and Greenstones (1894); and of a number of petrographical papers, dealing with perlitic and spherulitic structures, with the rocks of the Malvern Hills, and other related topics. In 1882 he was appointed lecturer in mineralogy at the Royal College of Science, holding this post until ill-health compelled him to retire in 1898. He died in London on 16 May 1904.
