= Frederick Howard (industrialist) =

British industrialist

Sir Frederick Howard DL JP
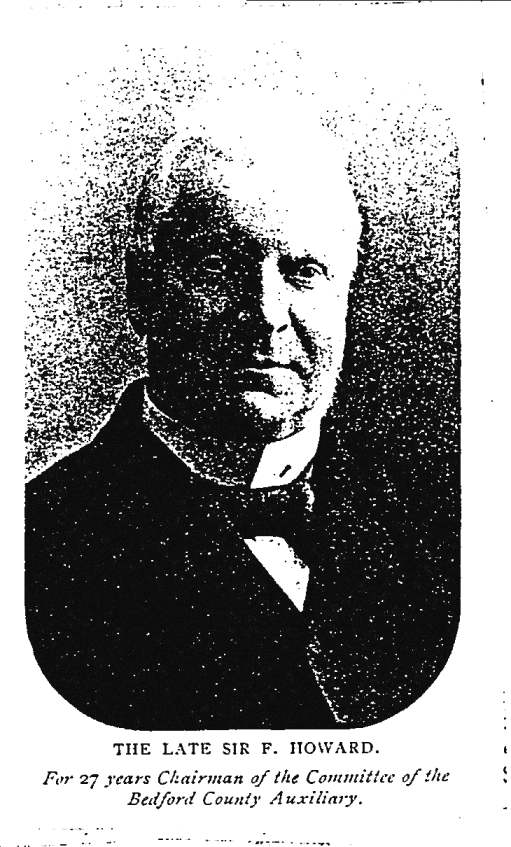
- John Howard in 1860
- Born: 28 September 1827; Bedford, England
- Died: 6 January 1915 (aged 87); Bedford, England
- Education: Bedford Modern School; Bedford School

Sir Frederick Howard DL JP (28 September 1827 – 6 January 1915) was a British industrialist who, with his brother James Howard, founded J & F Howard Ironfounders in Bedford.

== Life ==
Frederick Howard was born on 28 September 1827, the youngest son of John and Elizabeth Howard of Caldwell House, Bedford. His parents were nonconformists and he was baptized at the Wesleyan Methodist Church in Bedford on 25 October 1827. He was educated at Bedford Modern School and Bedford School (1839–41).

Howard succeeded his father in his agricultural machinery business in 1851. In partnership with his brother, James Howard, MP, he built the Britannia Iron Works at Bedford in 1857 and established J & F Howard Ironfounders. Howard was knighted in 1895. He was made Deputy Lieutenant of Bedfordshire and a JP for Bedford.

In 1851, Frederick Howard married Elizabeth Street; they had at least four daughters and one son, living at 17 Cardington Road in Bedford. Elizabeth Howard predeceased her husband and Howard died in Bedford on 6 January 1915. He is buried at Cardington, Bedfordshire.
