= Aiguille de Rochefort =

Mountain in the Mont Blanc massif

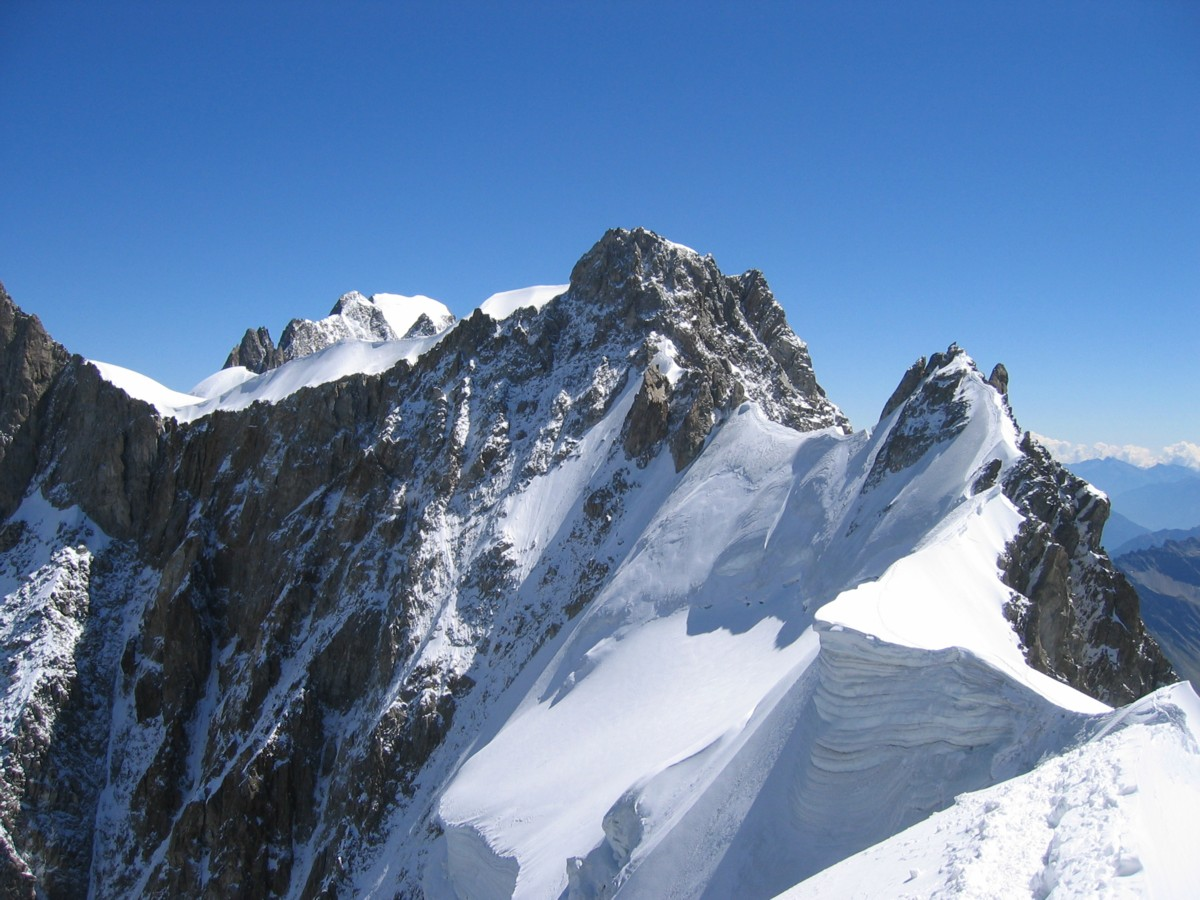
- The Aiguille de Rochefort

Highest point
- Elevation: 4,001 m (13,127 ft)
- Listing: Mountains of the Alps over 4000 metres
- Coordinates: 45°51′43″N 6°57′36″E

Geography
- Location within Alps
- Location: France / Italy
- Parent range: Mont Blanc massif

Geology
- Mountain type: Granite

Climbing
- First ascent: 14 August 1873 by James Eccles with guides Alphonse and Michel Payot
- Easiest route: Traverse of the Rochefort arête from the Torino Hut

The Aiguille de Rochefort (4,001 m) is a mountain in the Mont Blanc massif in France and Italy. The peak lies on the Rochefort arête between the Dent du Géant and the Grandes Jorasses and is usually climbed during a traverse of the ridge.

The first ascent of the peak was by James Eccles and guides Alphonse and Michel Payot on 14 August 1873.
