= Paul Güssfeldt =

German geologist, mountaineer and explorer

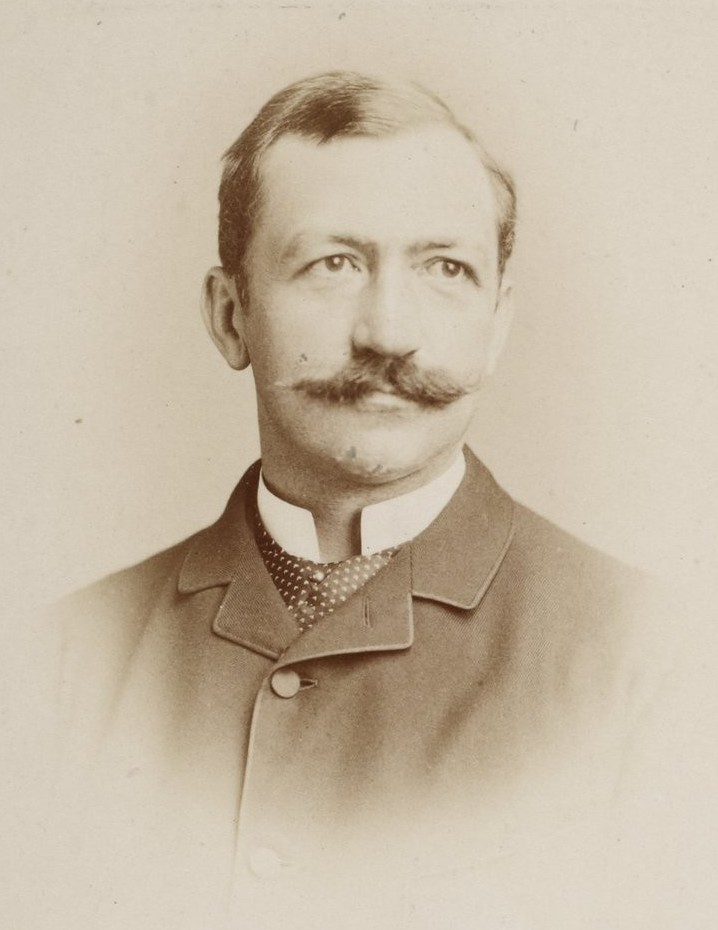
Paul Güssfeldt

Dr Paul Güssfeldt (spelled Güßfeldt in German) (14 October 1840 – 18 January 1920) was a German geologist, mountaineer and explorer.

== Biography ==
Güssfeldt was born in Berlin, where he also died almost 80 years later. After attending the Collège Français in his home city, he studied natural sciences and mathematics in Heidelberg (where he joined the Vandalia student corps), from 1859 to 1865, and then in Berlin, Gießen and Bonn.

When the first expedition was sent out by the German African Society (German: Afrikanischen Gesellschaft) in 1872, he was chosen its leader. The expedition sailed to the coast of the Kingdom of Loango, but was shipwrecked near Freetown on 14 January 1873 and lost all its stores and equipment. Although Güssfeldt succeeded in establishing a station on the coast, he was unable to penetrate into the interior, and returned to Germany in the summer of 1875. In 1876 he visited Egypt and the Arabian Desert (with Georg August Schweinfurth).

He made several first ascents in the Alps, including Piz Scerscen with Hans Grass and Caspar Capat on 13 September 1877 via the north-west spur (the Eisnase route). On 12 August 1878, Hans Grass, Johann Gross and he first climbed the Biancograt north ridge of Piz Bernina. He made winter ascents of the Grandes Jorasses and the Gran Paradiso, as well as putting up several new routes on Mont Blanc, including the Peuterey ridge on 15–19 August 1893 (with Emile Rey, Christian Klucker and César Ollier). Pointe Güssfeldt (4,112 m), the highest summit on the Aiguille Blanche de Peuterey is named after him, as is the Güssfeldtsattel, the col between Piz Scerscen and Piz Roseg also known as the Porta da Roseg. This steep ice slope was first climbed by Güssfeldt with guides Hans Grass, Peter Jenny and Caspar Capat on 13 September 1872.

Güssfeldt explored a portion of the Andes, where he discovered a number of glaciers in latitude 34° 30' S. He also ascended to the top of the volcano of Maipo. In 1883 he made the first attempt on Aconcagua by a European. Bribing porters with the story that there was treasure on the mountain, he approached Aconcagua via the Rio Volcan, making two attempts on the peak by the north-west ridge and reaching an altitude of 6,500 metres. The route that he prospected is now the normal route up the mountain.

Between 1889 until 1914 Güssfeldt was invited by the German Emperor Wilhelm II to join him for his annual summer cruise in the North Sea, which Güssfeldt was given the responsibility of planning as well. The emperor was fond of Güssfeldt and wrote about him in his memoirs.

== Works ==
- In den Hochalpen. Erlebnisse aus den Jahren 1859-85 (3d ed. 1893)
- Kaiser Wilhelms II. Reisen nach Norwegen in den Jahren 1889-92 (1892)
- Die Loangoexpedition, jointly with Julius Falkenstein and Eduard Pechuël-Loesche (1879 et seq.)

== Sources ==
- Johannes E. S. Schmidt: Die Französische Domschule und das Französische Gymnasium zu Berlin. Schülererinnerungen 1848–1861. Herausgegeben und kommentiert von Rüdiger R. E. Fock., published by Verlag Dr. Kovac, Hamburg 2008, ISBN 978-3-8300-3478-0 (German)
- Paul Güßfeldt: Dr. Gussfeldt’s Work in the Andes. Proceedings of the Royal Geographical Society and Monthly Record of Geography (New Monthly Series), 6, No. 11, 1884, pp. 658–661.
- Gilman, D. C.; Peck, H. T.; Colby, F. M., eds. (1905). "Güssfeldt, Paul" . New International Encyclopedia (1st ed.). New York: Dodd, Mead.
