= Aiguille du Plan =

Mountain in the Mont Blanc massif in the French Alps

Aiguille du Plan, 2006
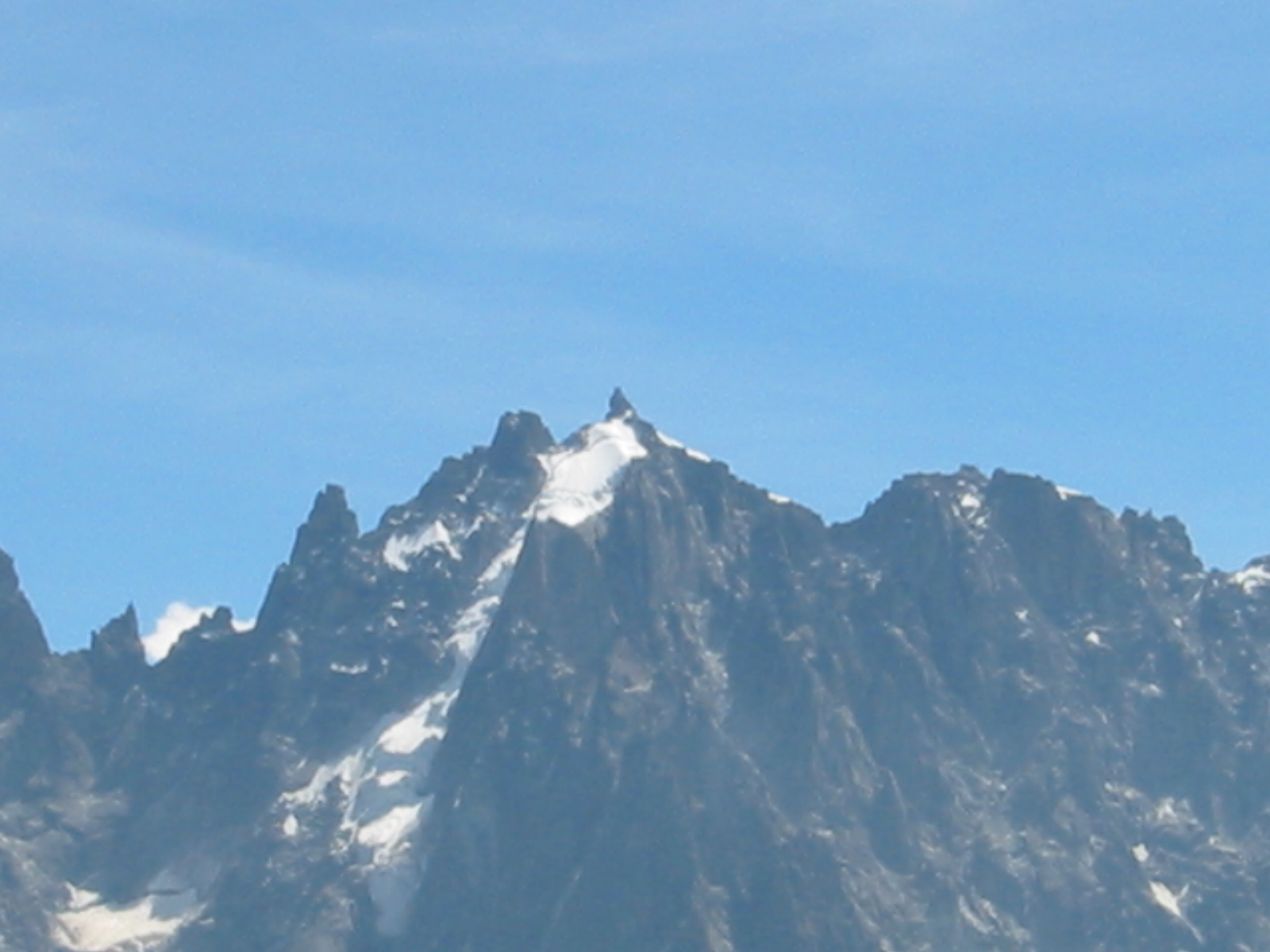
- The Aiguille du Plan

Highest point
- Elevation: 3,673 m (12,051 ft)
- Prominence: 198 m (650 ft)
- Listing: Mountains of France
- Coordinates: 45°53′30″N 06°54′26″E

Geography
- Location within France
- Location: Haute-Savoie, Rhône-Alpes, France
- Parent range: Mont Blanc massif

Geology
- Mountain type: Granite

Climbing
- First ascent: July 1871 by James Eccles with Alphonse and Michel Payot
- Easiest route: Midi-Plan traverse, PD/PD+.

The Aiguille du Plan (3,673 m) is a mountain in the Mont Blanc massif in the French Alps. Its needle-like summit lies in the centre of the Chamonix Aiguilles when viewed from Chamonix.
