= Whymper =

Whymper may refer to:

- Charles Whymper (1853–1941), English animal painter
- Edward Whymper (1840–1911), English mountaineer and explorer
- Frederick Whymper (1838–1901), English artist and explorer
- Frederick Whymper (cricketer) (1827–1893), English cricketer and factory inspector
- Josiah Wood Whymper (1813–1903), English wood-engraver and water-colourist
- Mr. Whymper, a human character in George Orwell's Animal Farm

== Other uses ==
- Mount Whymper (disambiguation), two separate mountains in Canada
- Whymper Spur, Antarctic rock spur named for Edward Whymper
- Whymper tent, A-framed tent used in mountaineering, designed by Edward Whymper
