= Mary Petherick =

British mountaineer and writer

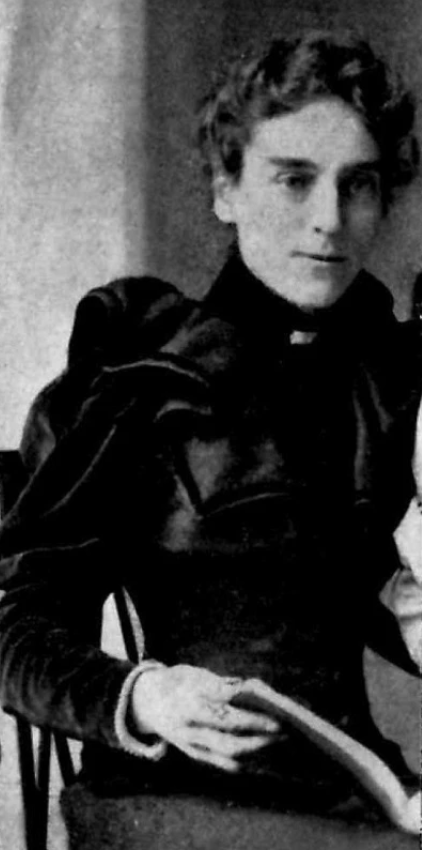

Personal information
- Nationality: British
- Born: 1859
- Died: 1946 (aged 86–87)

Climbing career
- Major ascents: Teufelsgrat

Mary Petherick, also Mary Mummery (1859–1946) was a mountaineer and writer, who was the first woman to ascend the Teufelsgrat.

== Biography ==
Petherick was born in 1859. Her father was J. W. Petherick, who was a solicitor from Exeter. She married Albert F. Mummery in 1883. Both she and her husband were excellent mountaineers, and often climbed together.

In 1887, she, Mummery and Alexander Burgener climbed the Jungfrau, Zinalrothorn, Dreieckhorn, and the Taschorn, and on 15 July made the first ascent of the Teufelsgrat (the Devil's Ridge) in the process. They ended up reaching the peak in a thunderstorm. In the course of the ascent, Petherick took on the role of medical advisor - bandaging hands and checking for broken ribs. She also had a deep respect for alpine guides, praising Burgener as 'the great man of the party'.

In Mummery's later book, My Climbs in the Alps and the Caucasus, he insisted that Petherick write the chapter on the ascent. In her chapter, she didn't just describe the ascent, but also used the publication as an opportunity to attack the sexism that was rife in mountaineering at the time. She wrote that:

The slopes of the Breithorn and the snows of the Weiss Thor are usually supposed to mark the limit of ascents suitable to the weaker sex-indeed, strong prejudices are apt to be aroused the moment a woman attempts any more formidable sort of mountaineering. It appears to me, however, that her powers are, in actual fact, better suited to the really difficult climbs than to the monotonous snow grinds usually considered more fitting. . . .The masculine mind, however, is with rare exceptions, imbued with the idea that a woman is not a fit comrade for steep ice or precipitous rock, and in consequence, holds it as an article of faith that her climbing should be done by Mark Twain's method, and that she should be satisfied with watching through a telescope some weedy and invertebrate masher being hauled up a steep peak by a couple of burly guides, or by listening to this same masher when, on his return, he lisps out with a sickening drawl the many perils he has encountered.

— Mary Petherick, My Climbs in the Alps and the Caucasus

She died in 1946.

== Historiography ==
Like many women mountaineers in the nineteenth century, such as Lily Bristow and Margaret Jackson, Petherick's achievements were little recognised at the time. In Petherick's case, despite her husband's support, his achievements overshadowed hers. Indeed, her husband is noted for saying that "All mountains appear doomed to pass through the stages: an inaccessible peak, the hardest climb in the Alps, an easy day for a lady.

Petherick's writing continues to be quoted and her mountaineering achievements are increasingly recognised of significance. Her writing is also recognised for its humour.
