= Mount Whymper =

Mount Whymper may refer to:

- Mount Whymper (Canadian Rockies), mountain located on the Canadian Rocky Mountains, British Columbia, Canada
- Mount Whymper (Vancouver Island), mountain located on Vancouver Island, British Columbia, Canada
