= Aiguille du Grépon =

Mountain in the Mont Blanc Massif in Haute-Savoie, France

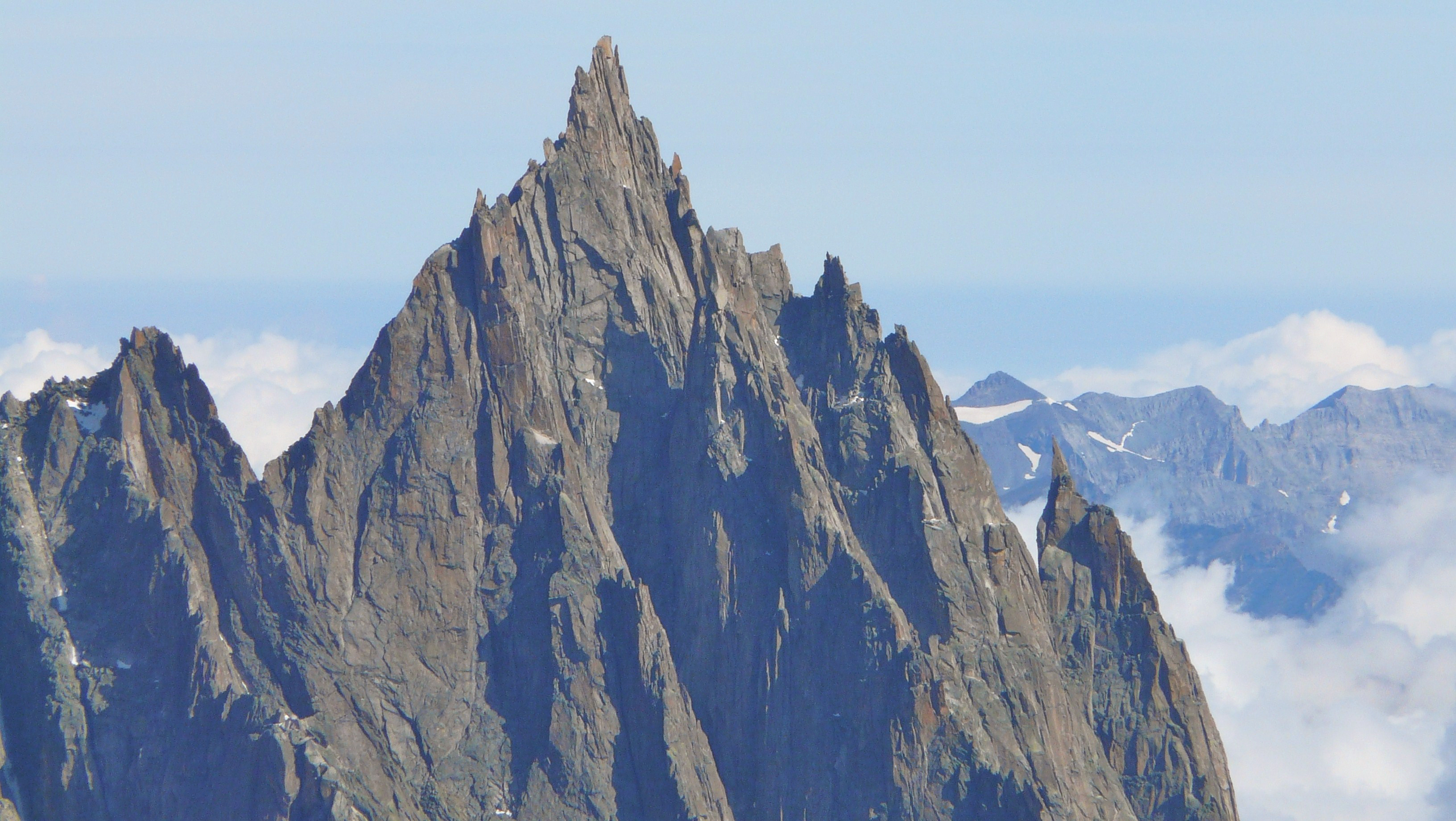
- The Grépon as seen from the south from Pointe Helbronner, showing the SW ridge and E face.

Highest point
- Elevation: 3,482 m (11,424 ft)
- Prominence: 190 m (620 ft)
- Coordinates: 45°54′09″N 06°55′09″E

Geography
- Location within France
- Location: Haute-Savoie, France
- Parent range: Mont Blanc Massif

Climbing
- First ascent: 5 August 1881, by Albert F. Mummery, Alexander Burgener and Benedikt Venetz

The Aiguille du Grépon (literally the Needle of Grépon), informally known as The Grepon, is a mountain in the Mont Blanc Massif in Haute-Savoie, France. The Grepon has a Southern (3,482 m) and Northern (3,478 m) peak, which are the highest points of a sharp granite ridge to the east of the Glacier des Nantillons above Chamonix and northeast of the Aiguille du Midi. A madonna statue is situated on the Southern peak.

== Climbing history ==
The first ascent was made in 1881 by the Swiss climbers Alexander Burgener and Benedikt Venetz guiding Albert F. Mummery from England. This team had climbed one of the peaks of the neighboring Aiguille des Grands Charmoz the previous year. Two days after an attempt on the East face was found too challenging, they climbed up the couloir separating the Charmoz and Grepon from the Nantillons site to climb the Grepon over the north ridge. The party took a very difficult narrow chimney from just below the col between the peaks. Though Venetz discovered the route and was the lead climber through it, this vertical crevice became famous as Mummery's crack. The party reached the Northern summit, built a cairn and returned, but Mummery wondered at night if the Southern summit they had seen may have been higher. Thus the party came back over the same route two days later and completed a traverse to the highest crag, which involved some abseiling, "a broad road suitable for carriages, bicycles, or other similar conveyances", and more spectacular final lead climbing by Venetz, who hauled Mummery to the top after he slipped halfway. The second ascent leader, François Henri Dunod, partly brought up three ladders as he had heard stories of the difficulty of this last pitch, though it turned out there was an easier crack to the top. More than 20 years later this rock climb was still considered to be one of the most difficult in the Alps.

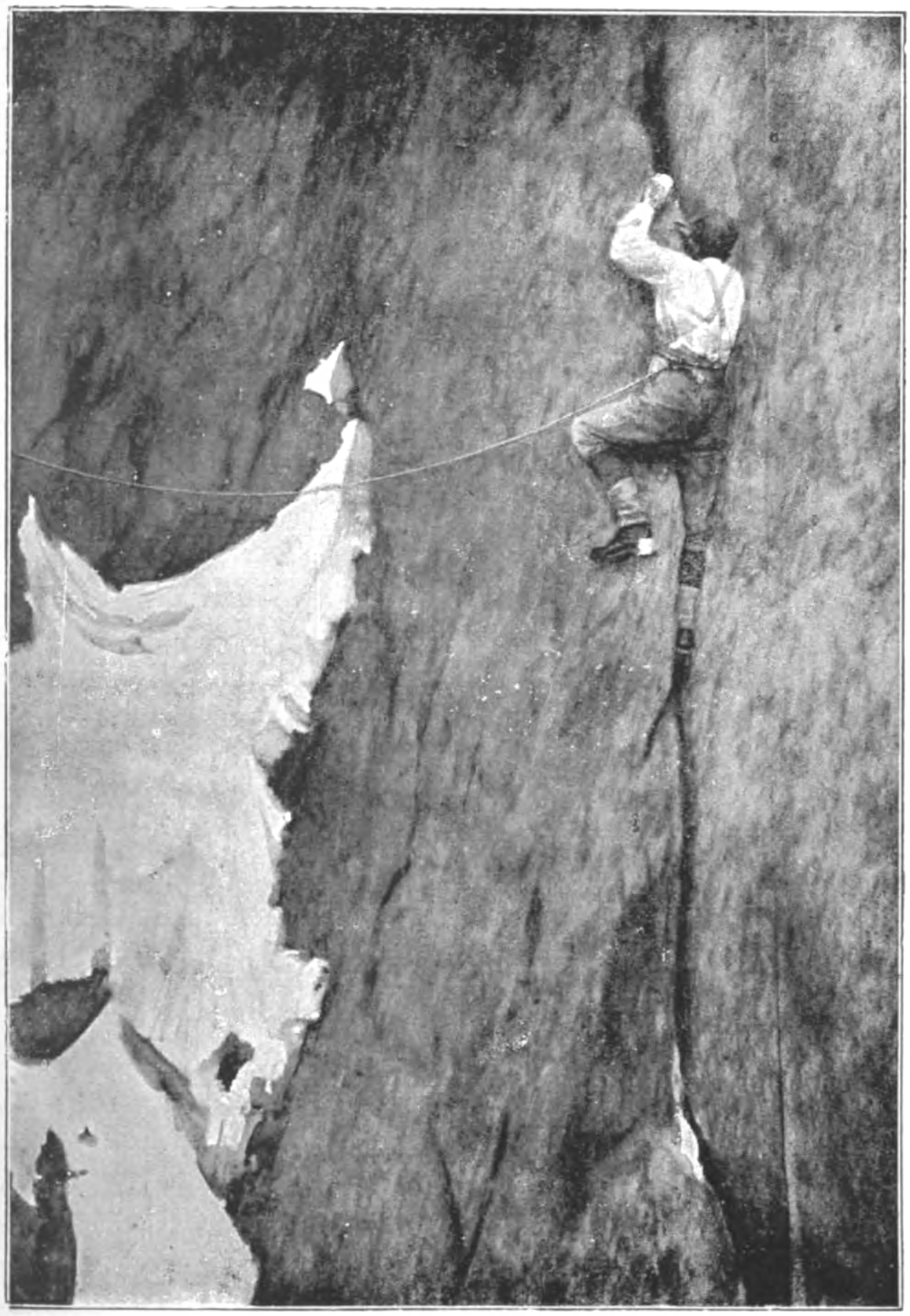
Albert Mummery in Mummery's crack in 1893 as photographed by Lily Bristow

Other climbing events:

- 2 September 1885: After a month of persistent effort, François Henri Dunod, François et Gaspard Simond and Auguste Tairraz climb the main summit from the south west. This route is slightly less difficult and is the normal route of descent.
- before 1887: An unknown party reached at least the Northern peak via the first ascent route, but avoiding the Mummery crack by driving wooden wedges into a crack on the East side of the ridge.
- 18 August 1892: Albert F. Mummery, John Norman Collie, Geoffrey Hastings and Henri Pasteur do the first north–south traverse.
- 4 August 1893: Lily Bristow is the first woman to climb the Grépon, traversing it with Mummery and William Cecil Slingsby, while taking pictures on the way
- 19 August 1911: First ascent East face (from the Mer de Glace) by Alexis Brocherel and Josef Knubel guiding Humphrey Owen Jones, Ralph Todhunter and Geoffrey Winthrop Young. This route contains the "Knubel crack", which was the first V+ pitch in the Mont Blanc region.
- 16 April 1927: First winter ascent by Camille Devouassoux and Armand Charlet
- 1929: Two women (Miriam Underhill and Alice Damesme) climb the Grépon without male assistance, leading mountaineer Étienne Bruhl to complain "The Grépon has disappeared. Now that it has been done by two women alone, no self-respecting man can undertake it. A pity, too, because it used to be a very good climb".
- 25 July 1947: First ascent West face by Robert Gabriel, Georges Livanos, Roger Duchier and Charles Magol

== Statue ==
Since 1927, at the top of the needle stands a statue of Our Lady of La Salette, 1.20 m high. With its weight of 44 kg, it was mounted on the back of a man on June 22, 1927, by eight guides of Chamonix members of the Jeunesse catholique.

== Bibliography ==
- François Labande, La Chaîne Du Mont-Blanc, sélection de voies. Tome 1, A L'Ouest Du Col Du Géant., Arthaud Guide Vallot GHM 2005, ISBN 2700305671
