= Mount Whymper (Vancouver Island) =

Mountain in British Columbia, Canada

Mount Whymper (Frederick)
- Location within Vancouver Island Location within British Columbia
- Interactive map of Mount Whymper

Highest point
- Elevation: 1,539 m (5,049 ft)
- Prominence: 889 m (2,917 ft)
- Listing: Mountains of British Columbia
- Coordinates: 48°57′04″N 124°09′44″W

Geography
- Country: Canada
- Province: British Columbia
- District: Kootenay Land District
- Parent range: Vancouver Island Ranges
- Topo map: NTS 92C16 Cowichan Lake

Mount Whymper is a mountain located on Vancouver Island, British Columbia. It is the highest point in Canada located south of the 49th parallel and is located between the headwaters of the Chemainus River and the South Nanaimo River 14 km (9 mi) north of Honeymoon Bay.

== History ==
This mountain was named in 1864 for Frederick Whymper who accompanied Robert Brown on the Vancouver Island Exploring Expedition

There is another Mount Whymper in British Columbia, named for Frederick's brother, Edward Whymper.
