= Gilgit Mountain =

Mountain in the country of Canada

- Location within Alberta Location within British Columbia Location within Canada

Highest point
- Elevation: 3,090 m (10,140 ft)
- Prominence: 62 m (203 ft)
- Parent peak: Nanga Parbat Mountain (3270 m)
- Listing: Mountains of Alberta; Mountains of British Columbia
- Coordinates: 51°42′33″N 116°51′16″W

Geography
- Country: Canada
- Provinces: Alberta and British Columbia
- Parent range: Park Ranges
- Topo map: NTS 82N10 Blaeberry River

Climbing
- First ascent: 1922 Howard Palmer, J. Monroe Thorington, Edward Feuz jr.

Gilgit Mountain is located on the border of Alberta and British Columbia at the head of Waitabit Creek and NE of Golden. It was named in 1898 by J. Norman Collie for Gilgit, Pakistan. Collie had accompanied Albert F. Mummery in an expedition to Nanga Parbat in 1895 where Mummery and two Gurkhas were killed in an avalanche on the mountain. Gilgit was the last civilization seen by the expedition.

== See also ==
- List of peaks on the British Columbia–Alberta border
- List of mountains in the Canadian Rockies
