= Lily Bristow =

English mountaineer

Emily Caroline "Lily" Bristow (1864 – 5 August 1935) was an English mountaineer who made numerous ascents in the Swiss Alps with Albert F. Mummery in the 1890s.

== Early life ==
Bristow was born in Brixton, Surrey, to George Ledgard Bristow (1827-1901) and his wife, Mary. Her father was a solicitor whose estate was valued at over £80,000 at his death (which would be about £8M in 2025).

== Climbing career ==
She made her first significant mountain ascent in 1892 when she climbed the Aiguille des Grands Charmoz in the Mont Blanc massif with Albert F. Mummery and his wife Mary. With their success, Bristow and Mary Mummery became the first women to climb the mountain. In 1893, Bristow climbed the Aiguille du Grépon—the ascent for which she was best known. This was the second-ever traverse of the Grépon, which had first been climbed by Albert Mummery two years earlier. The same year, she successfully climbed the Aiguille du Dru, the Zinalrothorn and the Matterhorn. She was known for climbing without local guides and for occasionally leading her climbing parties' ascents. Bristow's guideless ascent of the Grépon inspired Mummery to write: "All mountains appear doomed to pass through three stages: An inaccessible peak, the hardest climb in the Alps, an easy day for a lady."

It was noted that Bristow caused scandal amongst her acquaintances by choosing to share tents with men. Some have speculated that Mary Mummery later forbade her husband from climbing with Bristow, since Bristow did not accompany him on any of his 1894 expeditions, and there are no records of Bristow continuing her climbing career following his death on Nanga Parbat in 1895.

== As an artist ==
Bristow trained at Clapham School of Art in the latter part of the 1880s. She later enrolled at Herkomer’s Art School (1889-1891) where she lodged with another member of the art school, Edith M Petherick. Edith Petherick, who later joined the suffragette movement, was the younger sister of Mary Mummery (née Petherick), the wife of Fred Mummery, with whom Bristow climbed the Grepon.

Bristow's work was exhibited at the Royal Academy (1894 & 1899), Royal Society of British Artists (1889-1892) and the Society of Women Artists. She was a painter of landscapes and genre scenes in oils and watercolours. She provided some of the sketches which were used to illustrate Mummery's book "My Climbs in the Alps and Caucasus".

== In media ==
Elisa Kay Sparks has speculated that Lily Briscoe, a character in Virginia Woolf's novel To the Lighthouse, was named after Bristow.
