= Mummery tent =

19th-century lightweight mountaineering tent

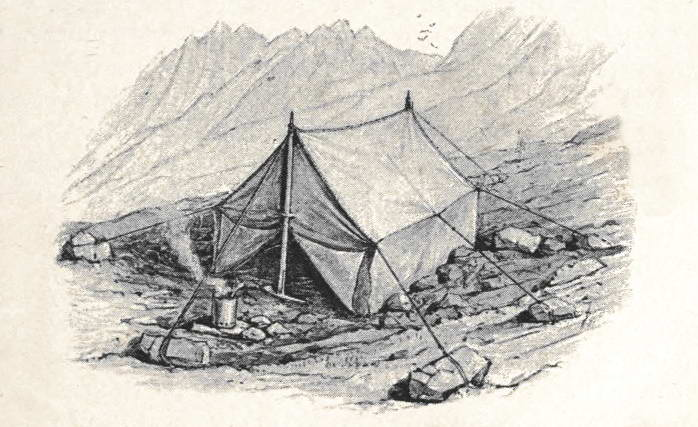
Dent's illustration of a Mummery tent

A Mummery tent is a small, lightweight tent designed and used by Albert Frederick Mummery in the 1880s and named after him. Fred Mummery (1855–1895) was an English pioneer in alpine climbing, making many first ascents, and he developed this type of tent for his lightweight expeditions.

== Background ==
The first tent designed specifically for mountaineering was the Whymper tent of the 1860s. This weighed about 20 pounds (9 kg) and used four poles 6.5 feet (2.0 m) long and so was only suitable for full expeditions of the kind Edward Whymper undertook in the 1860s in the Alps. Mummery favoured small expeditions without professional guides or porters so he required a much smaller and lighter tent, which he developed between 1888 and 1892.

== Design ==
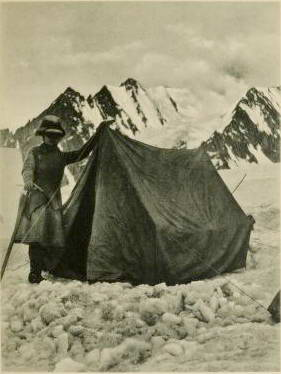
Fanny Bullock Workman beside her Mummery tent in the Karakoram

In his 1892 book Mountaineering, Mummery's contemporary Clinton Dent gave a detailed description of the design. It was a ridge tent with low side walls, very similar to a current-day "pup tent". The roof and wall material that he used was oiled silk. Tents were made in various sizes but 6 by 4 feet (1.8 by 1.2 m) was typical, which could accommodate two people. The ice axe was being developed from the earlier alpenstock and by the 1880s was generally about 4 to 4.5 feet (1.2 to 1.4 m) long. Mummery's revolutionary idea was to put them to additional use as tent poles – one at each end of the ridge and supported by guy ropes. The weight (excluding ice axes which were carried anyway) could be less than 2 pounds (1 kg) (3.5 pounds (1.6 kg) with groundsheet and tent pegs). Unlike Whymper's tent, which usually had attached flooring, Mummery used a separate groundsheet, if he used one at all.

== Production ==
Mummery did not attempt to exploit his design commercially but in 1892 the British firm Benjamin Edgington put the tent into production. Parsons, former CEO of Karrimor, has commented "... as a general design it was ideal and the tent, whether in canvas or silk, virtually became an emblem of high-altitude camps until the 1950s". It remained in production until 1968.

== Subsequent use and developments ==
"Why there are not more mountaineers who take small tents to the Alps is always to me a mystery. For long ago most of the huts have become abominations, whilst the free life that is afforded by camp life adds a very great charm to mountain expeditions. Having tried it so often in the Himalaya, in Skye, in Norway, in the Canadian Rocky Mountains, and Switzerland, perhaps I may be biassed, but even if I never again had a chance of climbing a first-class peak in the Alps, I would return there to live the lazy, delightful, disreputable life in a tent, near the ice and the snows and the pine woods, to smell the camp fire, lie on my back all day amidst the grass and the flowers, listening to the wind, and looking at the sky and the great silent peaks."

— From Collie's Climbing on the Himalaya and Other Mountain Ranges, 1902

Mummery tents were first used in Himalaya when Martin Conway took them on his Karakoram expedition of 1892. Mummery, Norman Collie and Geoffrey Hastings went on the 1895 Nanga Parbat expedition, the first to attempt an 8000-metre summit and which led to Mummery's death. Collie later described the small, silk tents they used and later wrote nostalgically of expeditions.

William and Fanny Bullock Workman explored Karakoram glaciers in 1908 and Fanny was photographed beside her modified version of the Mummery tent. (Note: For their 1906 expedition they mention adding flannel linings and sewn-in groundsheets.) In 1920 Harold Raeburn discussed an improved design with a groundsheet attached and commented that ice axes were too short to be tent poles. He recommended that two bamboo sticks 1 foot (0.3 m) long should be taken to fit over the ends of the ice axes. These tents were among those used on the 1921 British Mount Everest reconnaissance expedition and two Mummeries were used at the East Rongbuk Glacier camp before and after the culminating ascent to the North Col.
