= Whymper Spur =

Whymper Spur (80°25′S 21°29′W) is a rock spur rising to about 1,250 m eastward of Blanchard Hill in Pioneers Escarpment, Shackleton Range. Named by the United Kingdom Antarctic Place-Names Committee (UK-APC) in 1971 after English mountaineer and artist Edward Whymper (1840–1911), who made the first ascent of the Matterhorn, Switzerland, July 14, 1865; designer of the prototype of the Whymper tent, 1861–62.
