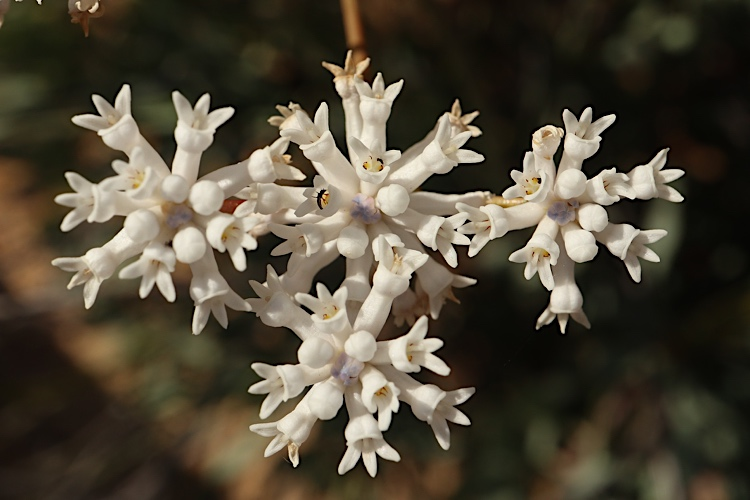
- Near Lake King

Scientific classification
- Kingdom: Plantae
- Clade: Tracheophytes
- Clade: Angiosperms
- Clade: Eudicots
- Order: Proteales
- Family: Proteaceae
- Genus: Conospermum
- Species: C. brownii

Binomial name
- Conospermum brownii Meisn.

= Conospermum brownii =

Species of Australian shrub

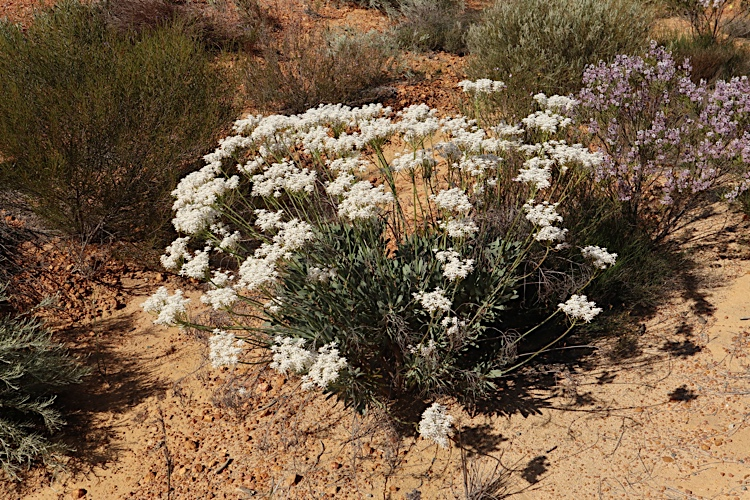
Habit

Conospermum brownii, commonly known as blue-eyed smokebush, is a species of flowering plant in the family Proteaceae and is endemic to the south-west of Western Australia. It is a more or less open shrub with glaucous, lance-shaped leaves with the narrower end towards the base, and spike-like corymbs of white to cream-coloured flowers.

== Description ==
Conospermum brownii is a more or less open shrub that typically grows to a height of up to 1 m (3 ft 3 in). It has sessile, more or less glaucous, lance-shaped leaves with the narrower end towards the base, 20–70 mm (0.79–2.76 in) long and 4–15 mm (0.16–0.59 in) wide. The flowers are arranged on the ends of branches in a spike-like corymb, on a peduncle 160–390 mm (6.3–15.4 in) long. The bracteoles are egg-shaped, 1.5–3 mm (0.059–0.118 in) long and 1–2 mm (0.039–0.079 in) wide, blue or mauve and conspicuous in the bud stage. The perianth is white to cream-coloured forming a tube 3–7 mm (0.12–0.28 in) long. The upper lip is 1.4–1.8 mm (0.055–0.071 in) long, the lower lip joined for 1.0–1.8 mm (0.039–0.071 in) long with lobes 1.0–1.5 mm (0.039–0.059 in) long and 0.5–0.7 mm (0.020–0.028 in) wide. Flowering occurs from August to October and the fruit is a nut 2.3–2.6 mm (0.091–0.102 in) long and wide with golden-brown hairs.

== Taxonomy ==
Conospermum brownii was first formally described in 1848 by Carl Meissner in Lehmann's Plantae Preissianae from specimens collected near the Swan River Colony by James Drummond. The specific epithet (brownii) honours Robert Brown.

== Distribution and habitat ==
Blue-eyed smokebush is widespread between Wongan Hills, Lake Grace and Norseman, in the Avon Wheatbelt, Coolgardie, Esperance Plains and Mallee bioregions in the south-west of Western Australia where it grows in sandy soils often over laterite.
