= Emily Whymper =

English painter and book illustrator

- Born: 1833
- Died: 1886 (aged 52–53); Hambledon, England
- Other names: Emily Hepburn Whymper, Mrs. J. W. Whymper
- Years active: 1877-1885
- Known for: painting
- Spouse: Josiah Wood Whymper

Signature
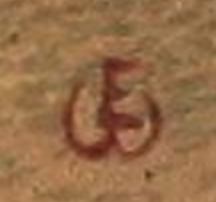

Emily Whymper (1833-1886) was a British botanical artist who exhibited landscape paintings in London. She also illustrated Beauty in Common Things, which was published in 1874 by the Society for Promoting Christian Knowledge.

== Biography ==
Emily Hepburn was born in 1833. In December 1866 she married Josiah Wood Whymper. Her husband was nineteen years older than her and already had eleven children from his first marriage. The couple had met at Maze Pond Chapel and she was his third wife. They had a son Charles Whymper, who was also a botanical artist.

Whymper exhibited her work at the Royal Academy in London during 1877 and 1878, including the work Hollyhocks. Her work was also exhibited at the Royal Institute (1883-5) and at the Society of British Artists. She also painted illustrations for postcards. Examples of Whymper's work are held at the Haslemere Educational Museum.

A successful botanical illustrator, Whymper's works appeared in books by several authors, including:

- Shirley Hibberd, Rustic Adornments for Homes of Taste (1870).
- A. C. Chambers, Beauty in Common Things (1874).

== Gallery ==
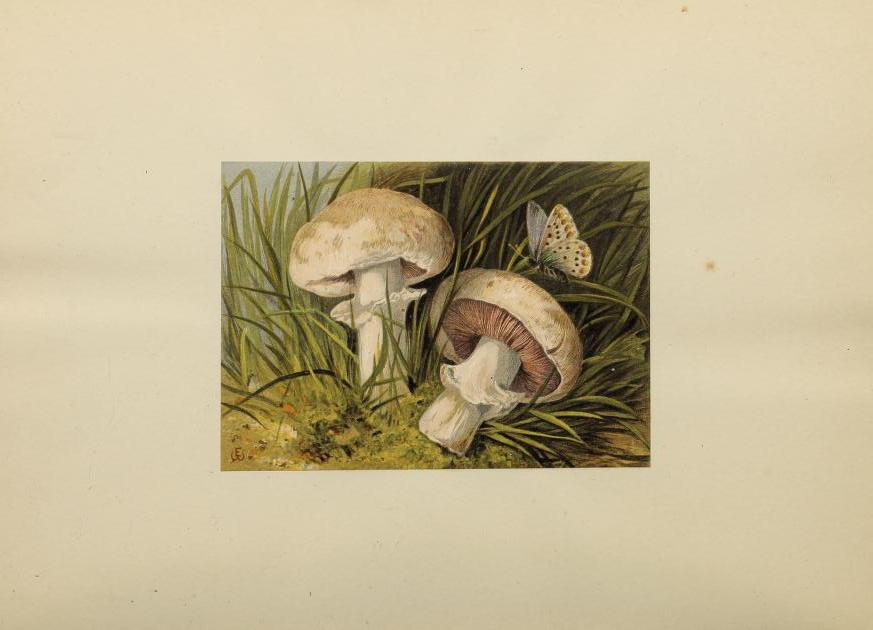
Mushrooms (Agaricus campestris)

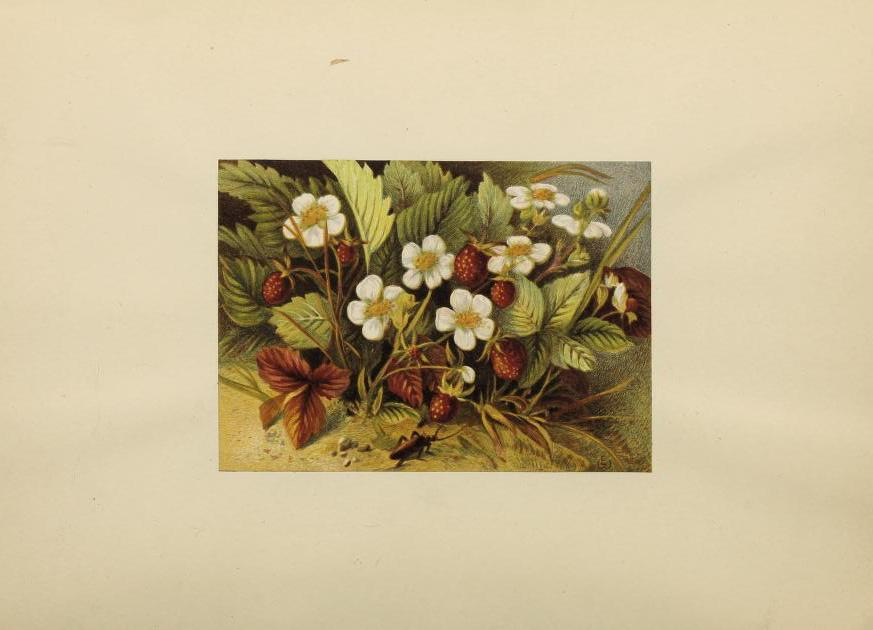
Wild strawberry (Fragaria vesca)

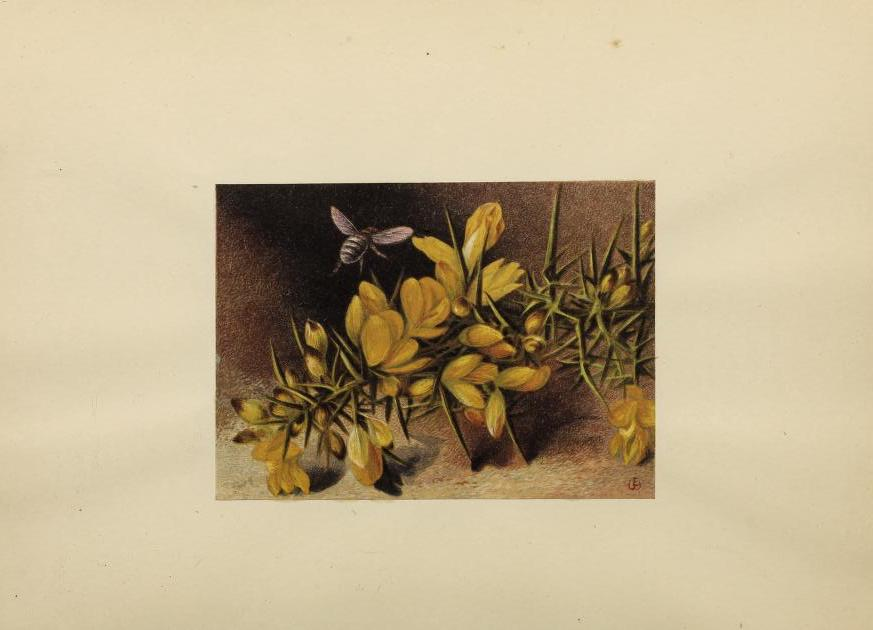
Furze blossom (Ulex europaeus)
