= Margaret Jackson (climber) =

English mountain climber (1843–1906)

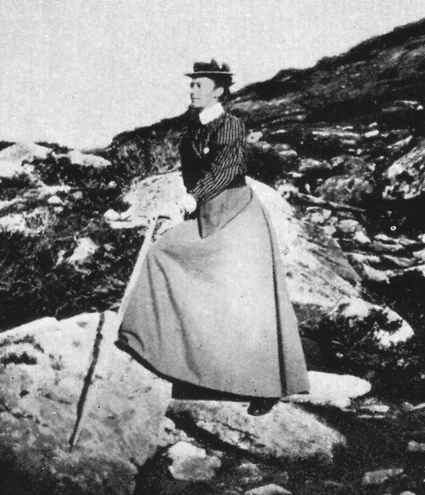
Margaret Jackson

Margaret Anne Jackson (née Sanderson, commonly referred to as Mrs E. P. Jackson; 27 September 1843 – 13 October 1906) was an English mountain climber. Climbing mostly in the Alps, she was described by Elizabeth Hawkins-Whitshed as "one of the greatest women climbers of her time".

== Early life ==
Margaret Jackson was born in 1843 to Jane and George Samuel Sanderson. In 1865, she married Edward Patten (E. P.) Jackson, the owner of a coal mine.

== Career ==
Jackson began climbing in the 1870s with her husband; together they made the first ascents of the Weissmies' east face in 1876 and the Dom's west ridge in 1878. Jackson's husband died in 1881 but she continued to climb, with increasing frequency. In 1884 she, Alois Pollinger (a Swiss mountain guide) and Johann-Josef Truffer became the first climbers to descend the west ridge of the Dent Blanche. With Pollinger, her most frequent climbing partner, she also climbed the Aiguille du Dru in 1886 and the Aiguille des Grands Charmoz in 1887.

After 1887, Jackson became interested in pursuing alpine climbs in the winter season (she had previously climbed exclusively during summer). Her most famous expedition was made in January 1888: over twelve days, Jackson made the first winter ascents of the Lauteraarhorn, the Pfaffenstöckli, and the Gross Fiescherhorn, followed by the first winter traverse of the Jungfrau—a feat that had previously been considered close to impossible. During a forced bivouac on the Jungfrau, Jackson developed severe frostbite resulting in the loss of several of her toes. Her frostbite injuries led to her retirement from serious climbing in 1889, by which time she had completed over 140 major climbs. In 1889, she wrote an account her Jungfrau expedition in the Alpine Journal, making her the first woman to be published in the journal under her own name.

== Death ==
Jackson died of acute pneumonia in 1906, in her home in Paddington, London. Her husband had died in 1881 and they never had children.
