= Edward Whymper =

English mountaineer (1840–1911)

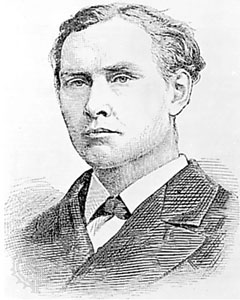
- Edward Whymper, engraving, 1881

Personal information
- Nationality: English
- Born: 27 April 1840 London, England
- Died: 16 September 1911 (aged 71) Chamonix, France
- Occupations: Mountaineer, illustrator, author

Climbing career
- First ascents: Aiguille d'Argentière; Aiguille Verte; Chimborazo; Grand Cornier; Grandes Jorasses; Matterhorn; Mont Dolent; Mount Whymper; Stanley Peak
- Known for: First ascent of the Matterhorn

Edward Whymper FRSE (27 April 1840 – 16 September 1911) was an English mountaineer, explorer, illustrator, and author best known for his 1865 first ascent of the Matterhorn. Four members of his climbing party were killed during the descent. Whymper also made important first ascents on the Mont Blanc massif and in the Pennine Alps, Chimborazo in South America, and the Canadian Rockies. His exploration of Greenland contributed an important advance to Arctic exploration. Whymper wrote several books on mountaineering, including Scrambles Amongst the Alps.

== Early life ==
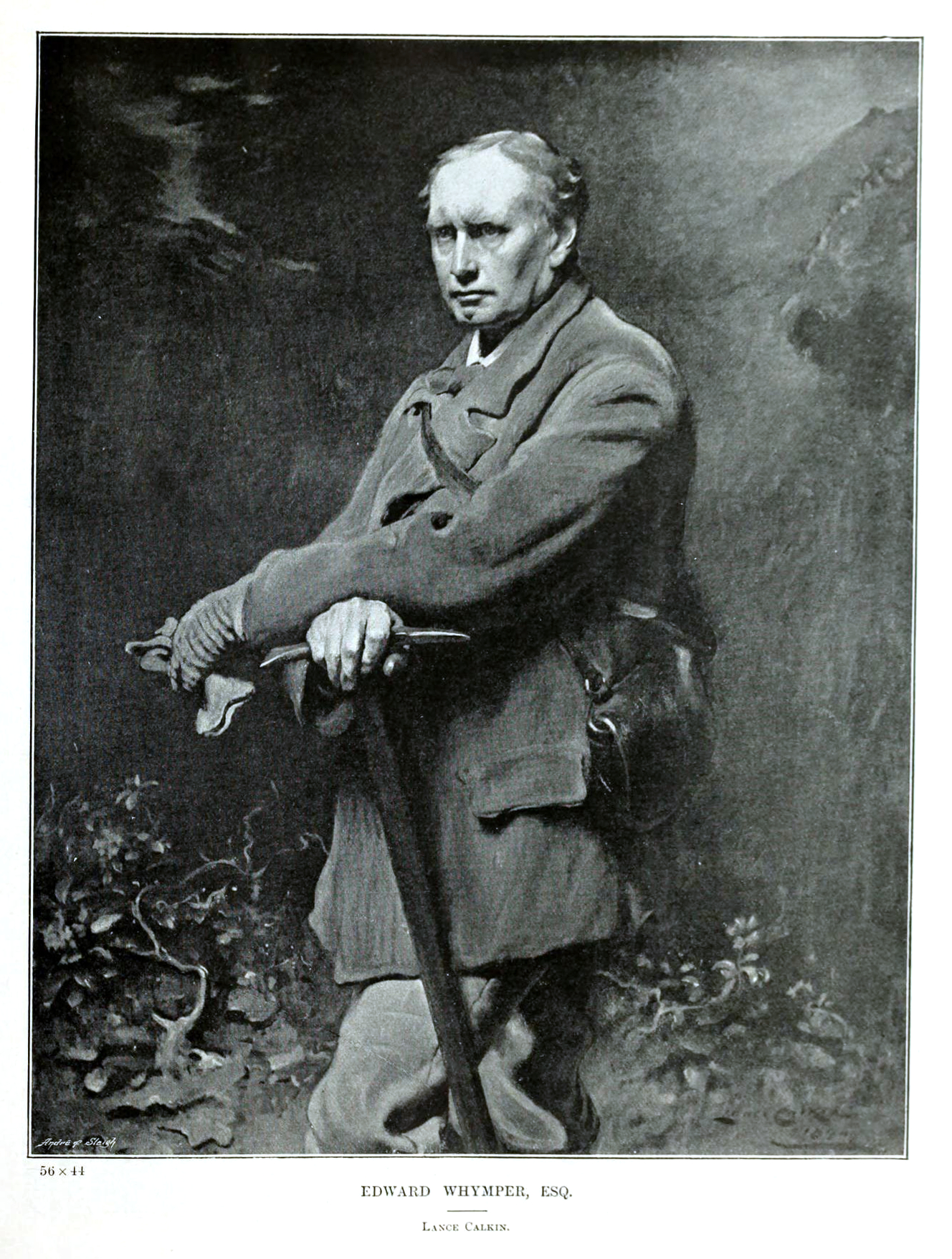
Painting by Lance Calkin (1884)

Whymper was born at Lambeth Terrace on Kennington Road in London on 27 April 1840 to the artist and wood engraver Josiah Wood Whymper and Elizabeth Whitworth Claridge. He was the second of eleven children, his older brother being the artist and explorer Frederick Whymper. He was trained to be a wood-engraver at an early age. In 1860, he made extensive forays into the central and western Alps to produce a series of commissioned alpine scenery drawings. Among the objects of this tour was the illustration of an unsuccessful attempt made by Professor Bonney's party to ascend Mont Pelvoux, at that time believed to be the highest peak of the Dauphiné Alps.

In 1861, Whymper successfully completed the ascent of Mont Pelvoux, the first of a series of expeditions that threw much needed light on the topography of an area which at the time was very poorly mapped. From the summit of Mont Pelvoux, Whymper discovered that it was overtopped by a neighbouring peak, subsequently named the Barre des Écrins, which, before the annexation of Savoy added Mont Blanc to the possessions of France, was the highest point in the French Alps. Whymper climbed the Barre des Écrins in 1864 with Horace Walker, A. W. Moore and guides Christian Almer senior and junior.

The years 1861 to 1865 were filled with new expeditions on the Mont Blanc massif and in the Pennine Alps, among them the first recorded ascents of the Aiguille d'Argentière and Mont Dolent in 1864, and the Aiguille Verte, the Grand Cornier and Pointe Whymper on the Grandes Jorasses in 1865. That same year he also made the first crossing of the Moming Pass. According to his own words, his only failure was on the west ridge of the Dent d'Hérens in 1863. As a result of his Alpine experience, he designed a tent which came to be known as the "Whymper tent", and tents based on his design were still being manufactured 100 years later.

== The Matterhorn ==
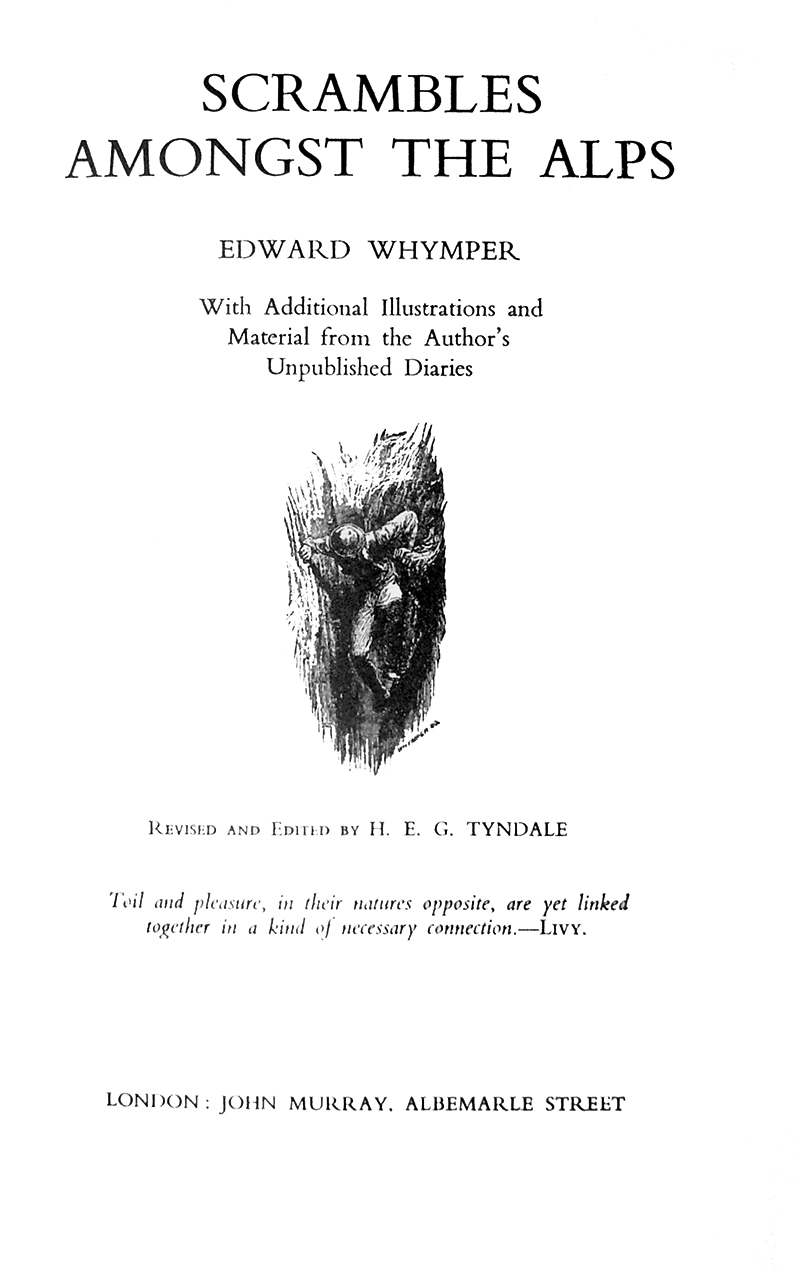
Title page of the 6th edition (1936) of Scrambles amongst the Alps

Professor John Tyndall and Whymper emulated each other in determined attempts to reach the summit of the Matterhorn by the south-western, or Italian, ridge. In 1865, Whymper, who had already failed eight times, attempted unsuccessfully to climb a couloir on the south-east face with Michel Croz. After Croz left for a prior engagement with Charles Hudson, Whymper was unable to secure the services of Val Tournanche guide Jean Antoine Carrel, and instead planned to try the eastern face with Lord Francis Douglas and the two Zermatt guides, Peter Taugwalder and his son of the same name.

Whymper was convinced that the Matterhorn's precipitous appearance when viewed from Zermatt was an optical illusion, and that the dip of the strata, which on the Italian side formed a continuous series of overhangs, should make the opposite side a natural staircase. This party of four was joined by Hudson and Croz, and the inexperienced Douglas Hadow. Their attempt by what became known as the normal route, the Hörnli ridge, met with success on 14 July 1865, only days before an Italian party. On the descent, Hadow slipped and fell onto Croz, dislodging him and dragging Douglas and Hudson to their deaths; the rope parted, saving the other three.

A controversy ensued as to whether the rope had actually been cut, but a formal investigation could not find any proof, and the elder Peter Taugwalder was acquitted. The rope had snapped between Taugwalder and Lord Francis Douglas. Whymper asked Taugwalder to show him the rope. To his surprise, he saw that it was the oldest and weakest of the ropes they brought, and one which had been intended only as a reserve. All those who had fallen had been tied with a Manila rope, or with a second and equally strong one, and consequently it had been only between the survivors and those who had fallen where the weaker rope had been used. Whymper also had suggested to Hudson that they should have attached a rope to the rocks on the most difficult place, and held it as they descended, as an additional protection. Hudson approved the idea, but it was never done. It can be deduced that Taugwalder had no other choice but to use a weaker rope, as the stronger rope was not long enough to connect Taugwalder to Douglas. The account of Whymper's attempts on the Matterhorn occupies the greater part of his book, Scrambles amongst the Alps (1871), in which the illustrations are engraved by Whymper himself. The accident haunted Whymper:

Every night, do you understand, I see my comrades of the Matterhorn slipping on their backs, their arms outstretched, one after the other, in perfect order at equal distances—Croz the guide, first, then Hadow, then Hudson, and lastly Douglas. Yes, I shall always see them ...

== Exploration in Greenland ==
Whymper's 1865 campaign had been planned to test his route-finding skills in preparation for an expedition to Greenland in 1867. The exploration in Greenland resulted in an important collection of fossil plants, which were described by Professor Heer and deposited in the British Museum. Whymper's report was published in the report of the British Association of 1869. Though hampered by a lack of supplies and an epidemic among the local people, he proved that the interior could be explored by the use of suitably constructed sledges, and thus contributed an important advance to Arctic exploration.

Another expedition in 1872 was devoted to a survey of the coastline.

== South American exploration ==
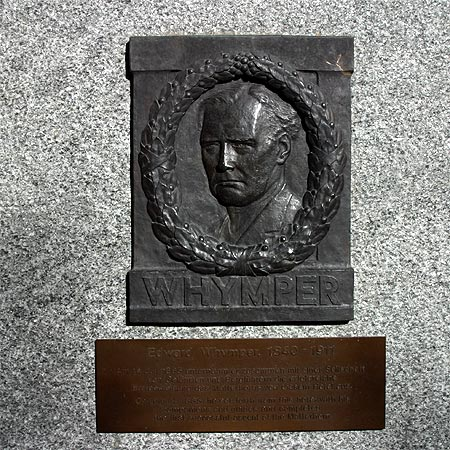
Commemorative plaque in Zermatt

Whymper next organised an expedition to Ecuador, designed primarily to collect data for the study of altitude sickness and the effect of reduced air pressure on the human body. His chief guide was Jean-Antoine Carrel, who later died from exhaustion on the Matterhorn after bringing his employers to safety through a snowstorm.

During 1880, Whymper climbed a number of volcanoes in Ecuador. He made two ascents of Chimborazo (6,267m), including its first ascent, as Alexander von Humboldt had not reached it in 1802. Whymper spent a night on the summit of Cotopaxi and made first ascents of Sincholagua, Antisana, Cayambe, Sara Urco and Cotacachi. In 1892, he published the results of his journey in a volume entitled Travels amongst the Great Andes of the Equator.

His observations on altitude sickness led him to conclude that it was caused by a reduction in atmospheric pressure, which lessens the value of inhaled air, and by expansion of the air or gas within the body, causing pressure upon the internal organs. The effects produced by gas expansion may be temporary and dissipate when equilibrium has been restored between the internal and external pressure. The publication of his work was recognised on the part of the Royal Geographical Society by the award of the Patron's medal.

Wymper's experiences in South America convinced him of certain serious errors in the readings of aneroid barometers at high altitudes, resulting in him publishing a work entitled How to Use the Aneroid Barometer, and introducing important improvements in their construction. He followed this with guide-books on Zermatt and Chamonix.

While in Ecuador, Whymper made a collection of amphibians and reptiles that he presented to the British Museum. The collection received some praise from museum director George Albert Boulenger, who said that "though containing no striking novelties", the collection was "interesting on account of the care bestowed by its collector in recording the exact locality from which every specimen was obtained". Boulenger described four new species from the materials, three of them named after Whymper: the snake Coronella whymperi (now a junior synonym of Saphenophis boursieri) and the frogs Prostherapis whymperi, Phryniscus elegans, and Hylodes whymperi (now a junior synonym of Pristimantis curtipes).

== Canadian Rockies ==
In the early 1900s, Whymper visited the Canadian Rockies several times and made arrangements with the Canadian Pacific Railway (CPR) to promote the Canadian Rockies and the railway in his talks in Europe and Asia. In exchange, the CPR agreed to pay transportation costs for him and his four guides. According to the surveyor and mountaineer A. O. Wheeler, Whymper was hired to “conduct explorations and surveys in the interests of the Canadian Pacific railway company” (Wheeler, 1905). In 1901, Whymper and his four guides (Joseph Bossoney, Christian Kaufmann, Christian Klucker and Joseph Pollinger) made the first ascents of Mount Whymper (named after him) and Stanley Peak in the Vermilion Pass area of the Canadian Rockies.

Mount Whymper on Vancouver Island in British Columbia is named after Whymper's brother Frederick, from his days as artist illustrator with the Robert Brown's Vancouver Island Exploring Expedition in 1864.

== Illustrator ==
When not climbing, Whymper pursued his profession as an engraver of illustrations for books and periodicals. Among the books he illustrated was his fellow-mountaineer Florence Crauford Grove's The Frosty Caucasus (1875) Whymper also illustrated and engraved John Tyndall's "Hours of Exercise in The Alps" (1871) and Augusta Bethell's Helen in Switzerland (1867). He illustrated books for Isabella L. Bird, but his brother Charles Whymper was the designer of the Henrietta Amelia Bird memorial clock tower in Tobermory, Isle of Mull, Scotland. It was built in 1905, funded by Isabella Bird (Mrs. Bishop) in memory of her sister.

== Final years ==
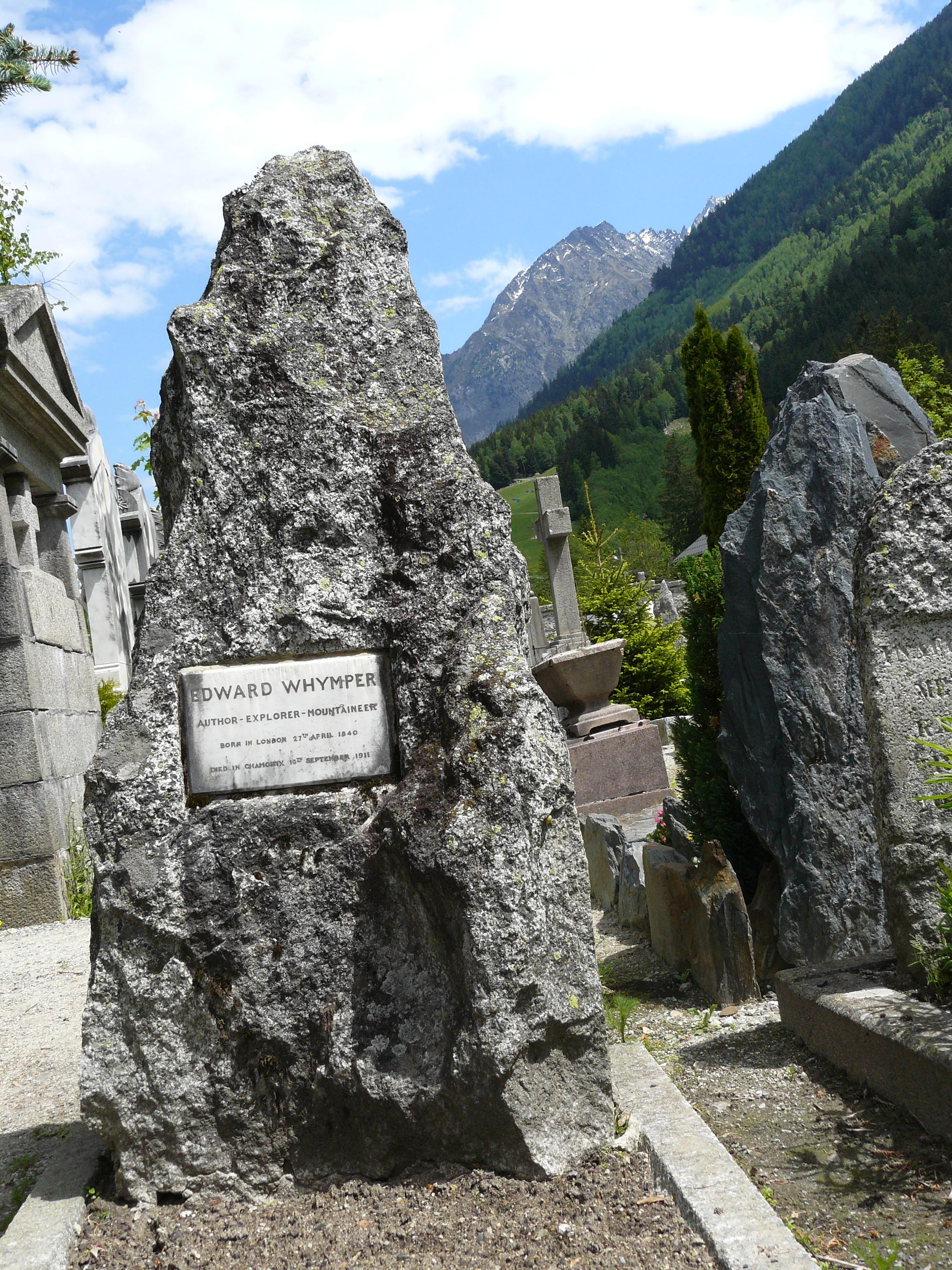
Whymper's Grave in Chamonix, France

On 25 April 1906, aged 65, Whymper married Edith Mary Lewin aged 23 (born 1883) at Emmanuel Church in Forest Gate, Essex (now London). The service was presided over by Canon J. M'Cormick, who had assisted the mountaineer after the Matterhorn accident. The marriage produced one daughter, Ethel, who was also a mountain climber and member of the Ladies' Alpine Club; she married fellow climber Edward Blandy. Whymper and Edith separated in 1910. Edith remarried in 1913 and died the following year from complications of pregnancy.

Shortly after returning to Chamonix from another climb in the Alps, Whymper became ill, locked himself in his room at the Grand Hotel Couttet, and refused all medical treatment. Whymper died alone on 16 September 1911, at the age of 71. A funeral was held four days later. He is buried in the English cemetery in Chamonix.

== Works ==
- Scrambles amongst the Alps. London: John Murray, 1871. ISBN 978-0898150438.
- Winter Pictures: By Poet and Artist. London: Religious Tract Society, 1875.
- The Ascent of the Matterhorn. London: John Murray, 1880. ISBN 978-0862993474.
- How to Use the Aneroid Barometer. London: John Murray, 1881.
- Travels Amongst the Great Andes of the Equator. London: John Murray, 1891. ISBN 978-0879052812.
- Chamonix and the Range of Mont Blanc: A Guide. London: John Murray, 1896.
- The Valley of Zermatt and the Matterhorn: A Guide. London: John Murray, 1897.
- The Apprenticeship of a Mountaineer: Edward Whymper's London Diary, 1855–1859. Ed. Ian Smith. London: London Record Society, 2008. ISBN 978-0900952432.
- Among the Tibetans by Isabella L. Bird (1894, as illustrator)

== Bibliography ==
- Gos, Charles (1948). "The Matterhorn Catastrophe". Alpine Tragedy. Trans. Malcolm Barnes. New York City: Charles Scribner's Sons. pp. 24–34.
- Lyall, Alan (1997). The First Descent of the Matterhorn. (Privately). Llandysul: Gomer Press.
- Smith, Ian M. (2011). Shadow of the Matterhorn: the life of Edward Whymper. Carreg. ISBN 978-0-9563163-1-8.
- Smythe, Frank S (1940). Edward Whymper. Hodder and Stoughton.
