= Blanchard Hill =

Hill in Antarctica

Blanchard Hill (80°26′S 21°56′W) is a hill between Mount Kelsey and Whymper Spur in the Pioneers Escarpment, eastern Shackleton Range. Photographed from the air by the U.S. Navy, 1967, it was surveyed by the British Antarctic Survey, 1968–71. It was named by the UK Antarctic Place-Names Committee after Robert Blanchard, American inventor of a light-weight tent using a rigidly tensioned frame erected outside the tent.
