= Alexander Burgener =

Swiss mountain guide

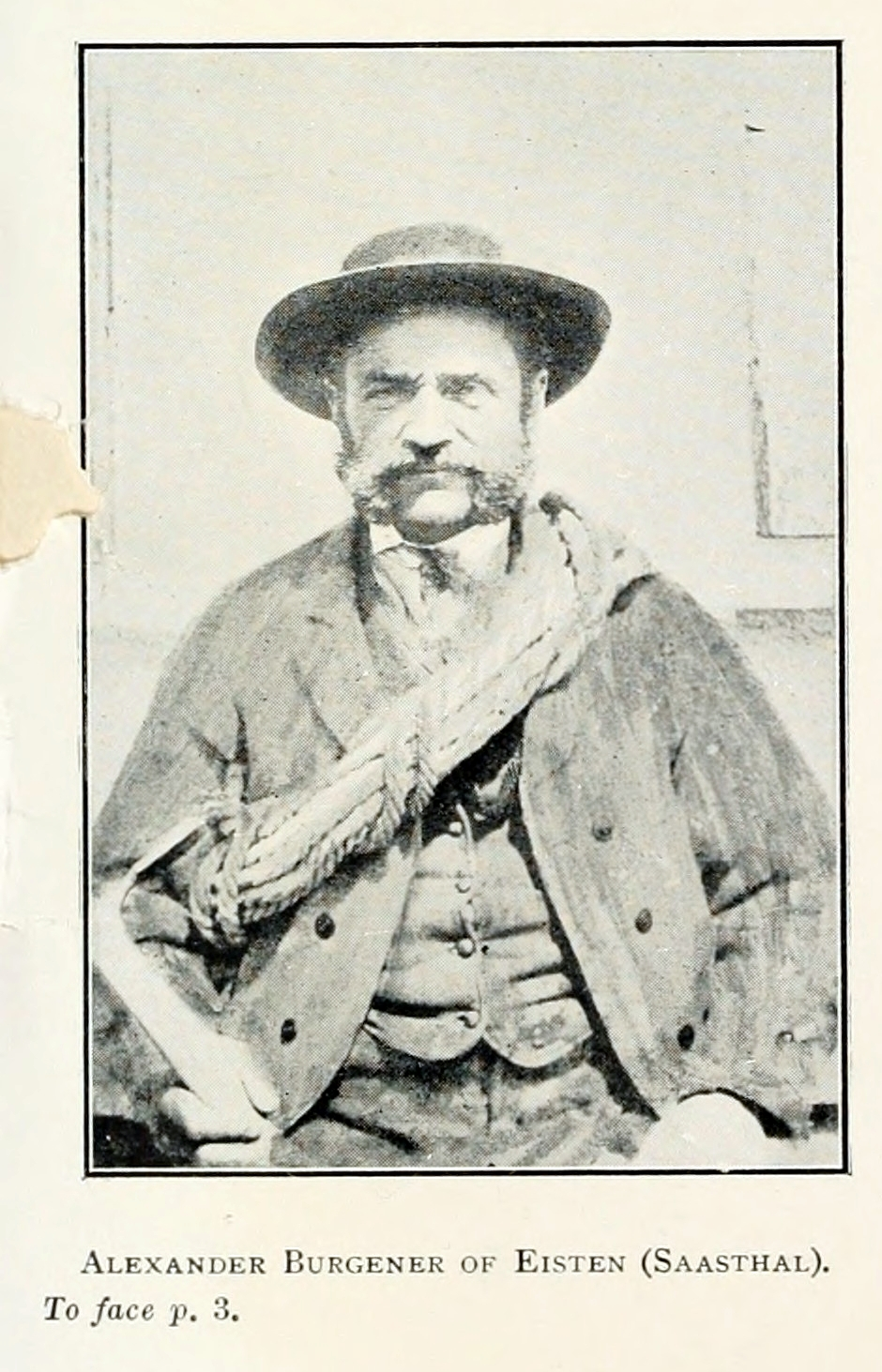
Alexander Burgener

Alexander Burgener (10 January 1845, Saas Fee – 8 July 1910, near the Berglihütte) was a Swiss mountain guide and the first ascentionist of many mountains and new routes in the western Alps during the silver age of alpinism.

Together with Albert Mummery, he made the first ascent of the Zmuttgrat on the Matterhorn on 3 September 1879, and of the Grands Charmoz in 1880 and the Aiguille du Grépon in the Mont Blanc Massif on 5 August 1881. With another British alpinist, Clinton Thomas Dent, he made the first ascent of the Lenzspitze on August 1870 and the Grand Dru on 12 September 1878.

He was killed by an avalanche on 8 July 1910 near the Berglihütte in the Bernese Alps. Six other climbers died in the avalanche, including Burgener's son Adolf. Another son, Alexander, lost an eye in the incident.

== First ascents ==
- Lenzspitze, 1870
- Portjengrat, 1871
- Grand Dru, 1878
- Zmutt ridge of the Matterhorn, 1879
- Traverse of the Col du Lion, 1880
- Grands Charmoz, 1880
- Charpoua face of the Aiguille Verte, 1881
- Aiguille du Grépon, 1881
- Frontier ridge of Mont Maudit, 1887
- Teufelsgrat of Täschhorn, 1887

== Bibliography ==
- Fux, A. (1961). Alexander Burgener, König der Bergführer. Bern: Verlag Hallwag.
- Mummery, A. F (2004). My Climbs in the Alps and Caucasus. Rockbuy Limited. ISBN 1-904466-09-5.
