= Lance Calkin =

British painter (1859–1936)

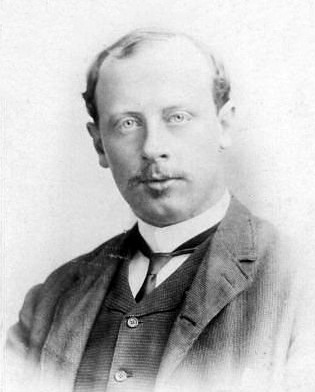
Lance Calkin

George Lance Calkin (22 June 1859 – 10 October 1936) was a British painter.

Calkin was the second child in a family of seven siblings. He was born in London, to Emily and George Calkin, a musician and composer. He was educated in a private school and then attended the Slade School of Fine Art and the Royal Academy Schools. His principal works were portraits of King Edward VII, King George V, Marquis of Camden and Joseph Chamberlain. Many of his works were reproduced in the weekly illustrated newspaper The Graphic.

Calkin married Alice Annie O’Brien (1870–1957) in Camberwell in 1891; they had three daughters, Joan Margaret (born 1892), Phyllis Eileen (born 1894) and Enid (born 1903). In 1895 he became a member of the Royal Institute of Oil Painters.

Calkin died in 1936 at Cresilton Road, Fulham, London.
