= Robert Brown (botanist, born 1842) =

British scientist, explorer and author (1842–1895)

Robert Brown (23 March 1842 – 26 October 1895) was a British scientist, explorer, and author.

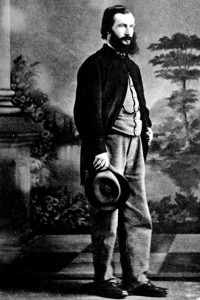
Robert Brown, PhD; honorary degree (1874)

== Biography ==
Brown was born in Camster, Caithness, and studied in the universities of Edinburgh, Leyden, Copenhagen, and Rostock.

He took the habit of referring to his home town, Campster (Campsterianus), to distinguish himself from his famous contemporary of the same name: Robert Brown of Montrose. He visited Spitzbergen, Greenland, and the western shore of Baffin Bay while still an undergraduate, and subsequently carried on scientific investigations among the islands of the Pacific and on the Venezuelan, Alaskan, and Bering shores, leading an expedition to map the interior of Vancouver Island and writing much on the fauna and flora of those countries.

== Exploration and travel ==
Brown arrived at Fort Victoria in early 1863 to explore the Colony of Vancouver Island. Later that year, he explored from Barkley Sound to Kyuquot. The following year he accepted the leadership of the Vancouver Island Exploring Expedition, a venture which covered about 2000 km over four and a half months. The expedition named many of the mountains, rivers and lakes of Vancouver Island. Members of expedition, which included Frederick Whymper as its artist, insisted that Browns River be named after him. They found gold at the Leech River, causing much excitement, but the results were limited to $60,000. Brown attributed more importance to their discovery of coal in the Comox Valley. He took an interest in Chinook jargon.

With Edward Whymper, brother of Frederick, he attempted to penetrate the inland ice of Greenland in 1867, and made many discoveries concerning its nature which were later confirmed by Robert Peary. He traveled in the Barbary States of North Africa, and became the foremost British authority on Morocco almost by accident, having gone there for a holiday but having found himself unable to enjoy idleness.

== Lecturing and writing ==
Before he was 30 years old Brown had written over 30 academic papers and an advanced textbook on botany, in addition to more popularising works. He wrote up his Vancouver Island travels and was awarded a doctorate based on this by the University of Rostock in 1869.

He was a lecturer on geology, botany, and zoology in Edinburgh and Glasgow, and was a member of many learned societies in England, America, and on the Continent. He was president of the Royal Physical Society of Edinburgh, and a member of the council of the Royal Geographical Society.

Brown moved to London in 1876 and spent the rest of his life writing, earning his living as a journalist. In addition to botany, he also wrote prolifically on zoology, geology, and geography, for both learned and popular audiences. One example of this ability to write for generalists and specialists is the extensive commentary he contributed to an 1896 reprint of the 1807 slave narrative of John R. Jewitt, in which Brown reflects on the changes in the lives of the indigenous peoples of the Pacific Northwest Coast from the time of the first European explorers in the late eighteenth century, to Maquinna's chiefdom and Jewitt's captivity, to his own explorations in 1863, when intertribal warfare was still rife, to the situation in the mid-1890s, by when many of the nations were on the brink of extinction.

According to the Oxford English Dictionary, Brown's 1886 book Spunyarn and Spindrift, A sailor boy’s log of a voyage out and home in a China tea-clipper contains the earliest known usage in print of Gadget.

Brown had been a strong, confident, fun-loving young man, but worked too hard, and was both incapable of relaxing and at the same time exhausted by London life. He grew jaded that his best work went unrecognised, and died 26 October 1895, only 53 years old, working to the night of his death as a writer. He was buried at West Norwood Cemetery.

== Publications ==
In addition to many scientific papers, articles, and reviews in various languages, his publications included:

- Manual of Botany (1874)
- Science for All (five volumes, 1877–82)
- The World Its Cities And Peoples (volumes IV-IX, 1882–85)
- Spunyarn and spindrift: a sailor boy's log of a voyage out and home in a china tea-clipper (1886)
- The Story of Africa and Its Explorers (four volumes, 1892–95; new edition, 1911)
- The adventures of John Jewitt : only survivor of the crew of the ship Boston during a captivity of nearly three years among the Indians of Nootka Sound in Vancouver Island (1896) reprint with notes and 30-page introduction by Robert Brown at Internet Archive.

== Sources ==
- "Obituary: Dr. Robert Brown". The Geographical Journal. 6 (6): 577–578. December 1895. JSTOR 1774018.
- Biography at the Dictionary of Canadian Biography Online
- A four-page description of his life and work, by an "A.J.W.", as preface to The adventures of John Jewitt, a memoir to which Brown had contributed extensive commentary. Also includes a photographic portrait of him in 1870. Full text at Internet Archive.
