= Whymper tent =

19th-century mountaineering tent

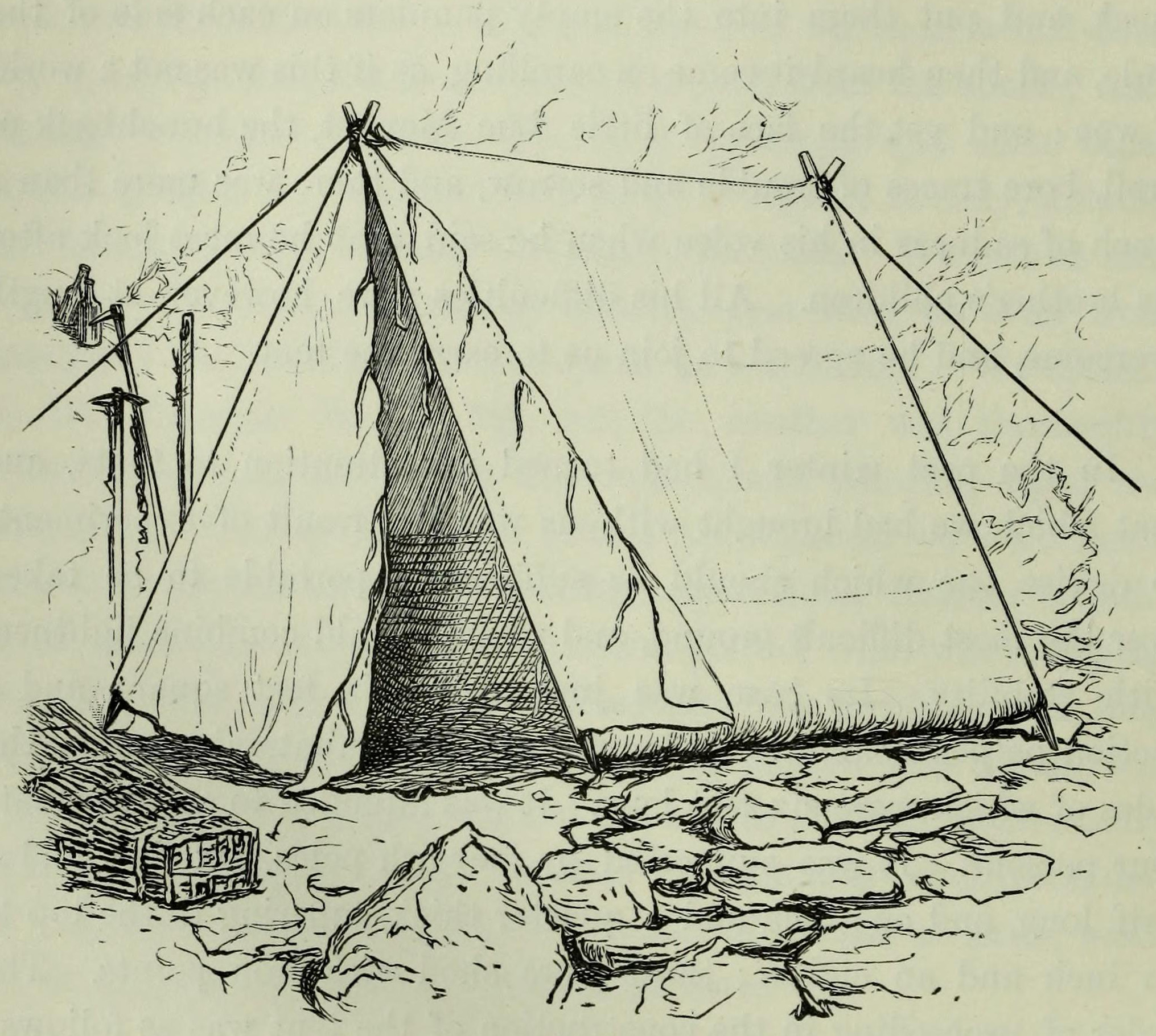
Whymper's original drawing

A Whymper tent is a ridge tent of A-frame construction used for mountaineering which was designed by English mountaineer Edward Whymper (1840–1911) and named after him. Whymper was the first person to ascend the Matterhorn. Tents using his general design were in common use from the later part of the nineteenth century to the mid-twentieth century and were referred to generically as "Whymper tents". A later smaller variant of the design was called the Meade tent.

== Background ==
In the mid-19th century there were no tents available suitable for mountain climbing. The only tents manufactured were large ones for military use and so mountaineers needed to design and build their own. It was in this context that Whymper designed in 1862–65 and publicised his tent although he did not attempt any commercial exploitation. Whymper pioneered expedition-style mountaineering and his design was larger and much heavier than the Mummery tent designed some 25 years later by Fred Mummery (1855 – 1895) who favoured lightweight climbing.

== Design ==
Whymper described his design in Scrambles amongst the Alps, first published in 1869. The floor area is six feet (1.8 m) square and in cross section it is an equilateral triangle. Whymper said the tent weighed about 23 pounds (10 kg) and could accommodate four people.

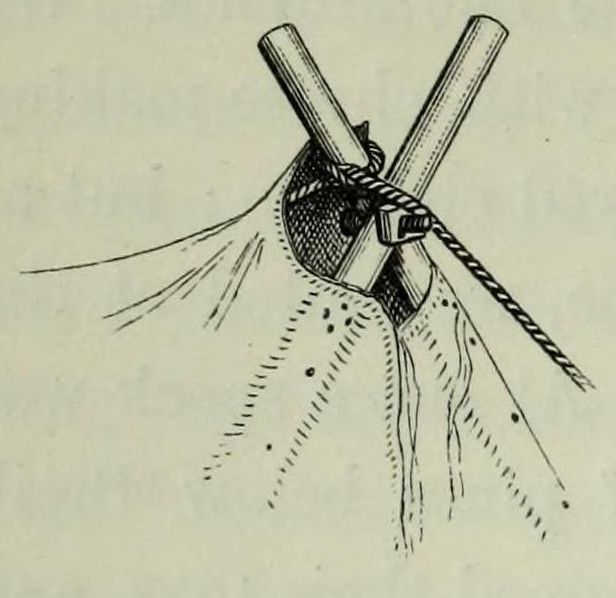
Detail of crossing of tent poles

Each end comprises two ash poles, each six foot six inches (2.0 m) long, fitted with iron ends and drilled near the upper ends so each pair of poles can be bolted together so that they cross. The roof is made of a single sheet of unbleached cotton canvas sewn around the four poles. A triangular sheet of canvas is sewn in to close one end and two triangular sheets form an entrance at the other end. The floor is a 9-foot (2.7 m) square of mackintosh material, sewn to the roof sheet and the closed end. The flooring extends up the sides to stop draughts. At the entrance the flooring extends upwards one foot. The entrance flaps are fitted with tapes and the roofing material is nailed to the poles for strength.

When required, the tent was unrolled and erected as a whole. A climbing rope was used to go over the crossing of each pair of poles and along the ridge underneath the roof material. The rope was held taut in front of and behind the tent but guy ropes, as such, were not used.

After it had been lying in a barn in Valtournenche in the Italian Alps for over 100 years, the original tent was donated to the Alpine Club in 1965 by Guido Monzino and it has been restored by the Royal School of Needlework.

== Subsequent use and the Meade tent ==
In the United Kingdom, businesses such as Black's and Benjamin Edgington's manufactured and retailed tents to Whymper's general design, calling them "Whymper" tents and these became the dominant design. Edgington's first sold them in 1892 and were still advertising them in 1960. Arguably, for mountain use the design was not improved on until geodesic dome tents appeared in the late 1970s although changes were made such as improved fabrics and replacing wooden poles with aluminium. The A-frame (A-pole) construction was resistant to wind and was very stable. A flysheet was sometimes recommended and the poles could be made of bamboo. However, the original size was sometimes found too small for four people and a 7-foot (2.1 m) square version weighing 26 pounds (12 kg) was available.

The 1921 British Mount Everest reconnaissance expedition used Mummery tents and 35-pound (16 kg) Whymper tents (as well as 40-pound (18 kg) and 80-pound (36 kg) military tents) but for the 1922 Everest expedition a modification was tried using a smaller 19-pound (8.6 kg) version with a flysheet, which was called a Meade tent, after the British climber, Charles Meade. In a few cases a circular entrance was adopted for each kind of tent but this was not popular with the climbers. The expedition also used Whymper tents in preference to the heavier ones of 1921. It was from a small, two-man, 10-pound (4.5 kg) Meade tent at Camp VI that George Mallory and Sandy Irvine left on their final attempt on the summit of Everest on the 1924 expedition. The 1933 Everest expedition used Meade tents 6.5 by 4 feet (2.0 by 1.2 m) that weighed 16 pounds (7.3 kg) as well as 7-foot (2.1 m) square Whymper tents. The successful 1953 expedition used two-man Meade tents for the higher camps and Hunt reported that one night at a low level eight Sherpas slept in a two-man tent.
