= Mount Whymper (Canadian Rockies) =

Mountain in British Columbia, Canada

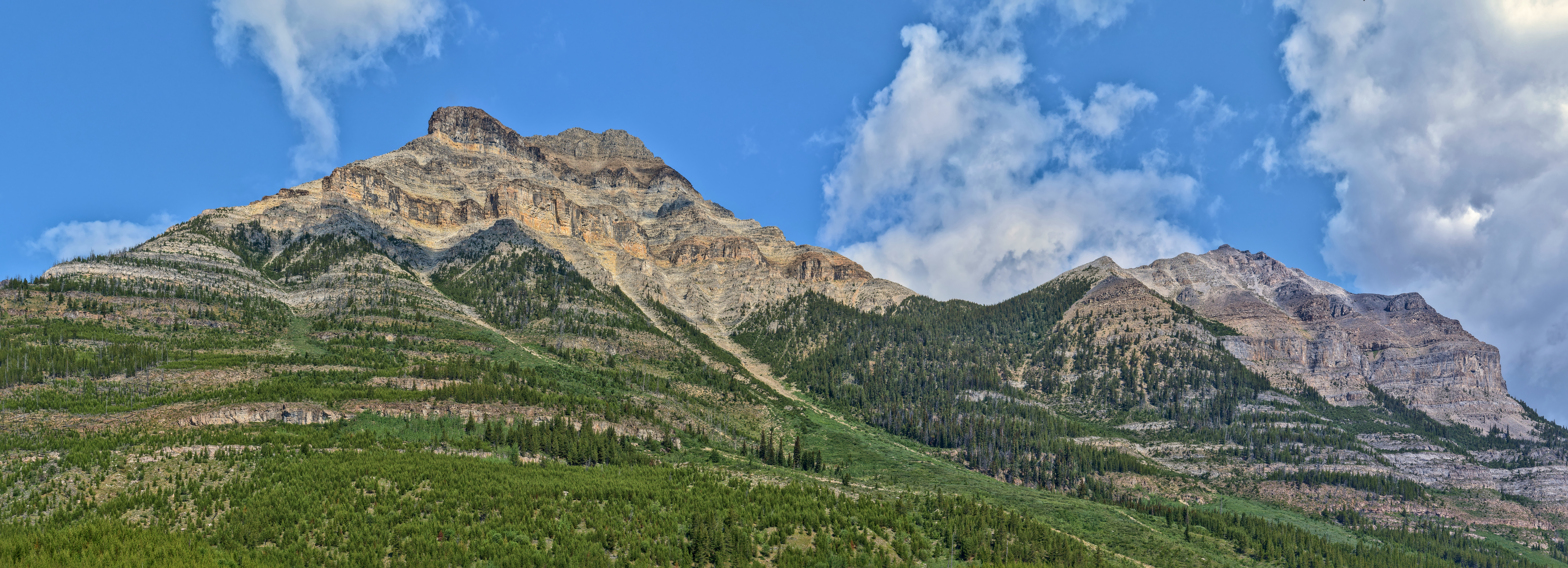

Highest point
- Elevation: 2,845 m (9,334 ft)
- Prominence: 263 m (863 ft)
- Coordinates: 51°13′27″N 116°05′54″W

Geography
- Location within British Columbia
- Interactive map of Mount Whymper
- Country: Canada
- Province: British Columbia
- District: Kootenay Land District
- Protected area: Kootenay National Park
- Parent range: Bow Range
- Topo map: NTS 82N1 Mount Goodsir

Climbing
- First ascent: recorded in 1901 by Edward Whymper Joseph Bossoney, Christian Kaufmann, Christian Klucker, and Joseph Pollinger
- Easiest route: Moderate Scramble

Mount Whymper is a 2,845-metre (9,334 ft) mountain located in the Canadian Rockies, British Columbia, Canada, in the Vermilion Pass area in Kootenay National Park. The mountain is named for its first recorded conqueror, the English alpinist, explorer, writer, and engraver, Edward Whymper.

In 1901, Whymper and his four guides (Joseph Bossoney, Christian Kaufmann, Christian Klucker, and Joseph Pollinger) are the first who are recorded to have climbed to the top of this Mount Whymper. Sponsored by Canadian Pacific Railway (CPR), Whymper was exploring the area in order to promote the Canadian Rocky Mountains and the railway in his conferences.

There is another Mount Whymper in British Columbia, on Vancouver Island, in the northeastern Pacific Ocean on the southern coast of that Canadian province. It is named for Frederick Whymper, Edward's brother.

== Geology ==
Mount Whymper is composed of sedimentary rock laid down during the Precambrian to Jurassic periods. Formed in shallow seas, this sedimentary rock was pushed east and over the top of younger rock during the Laramide orogeny.

== Climate ==
Based on the Köppen climate classification, Mount Whymper is located in a subarctic climate zone with cold, snowy winters and mild summers. Winter temperatures may drop below −20 °C (−4 °F) with wind chill factors below −30 °C (−22 °F).

== Gallery ==
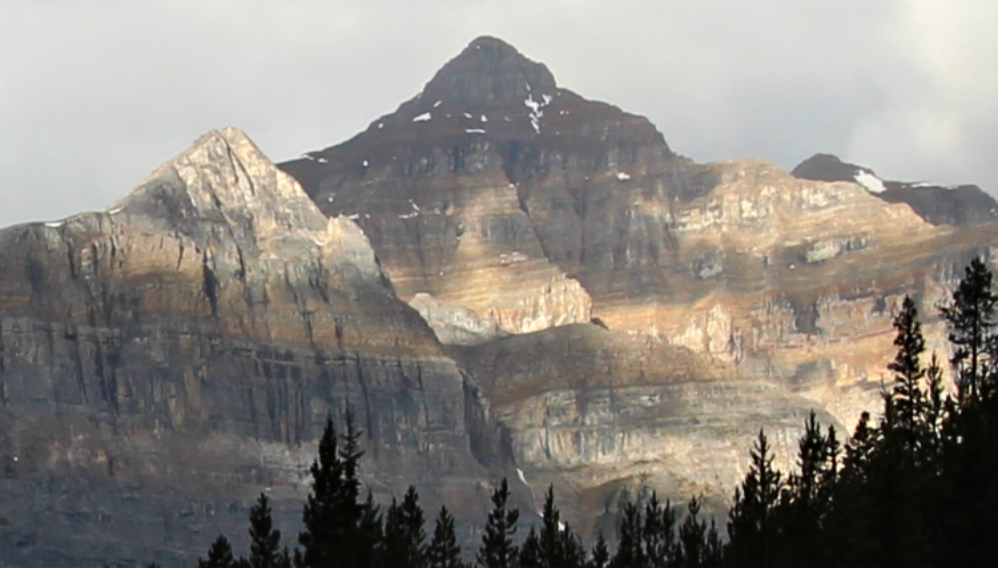
Mount Whymper seen from Highway 93

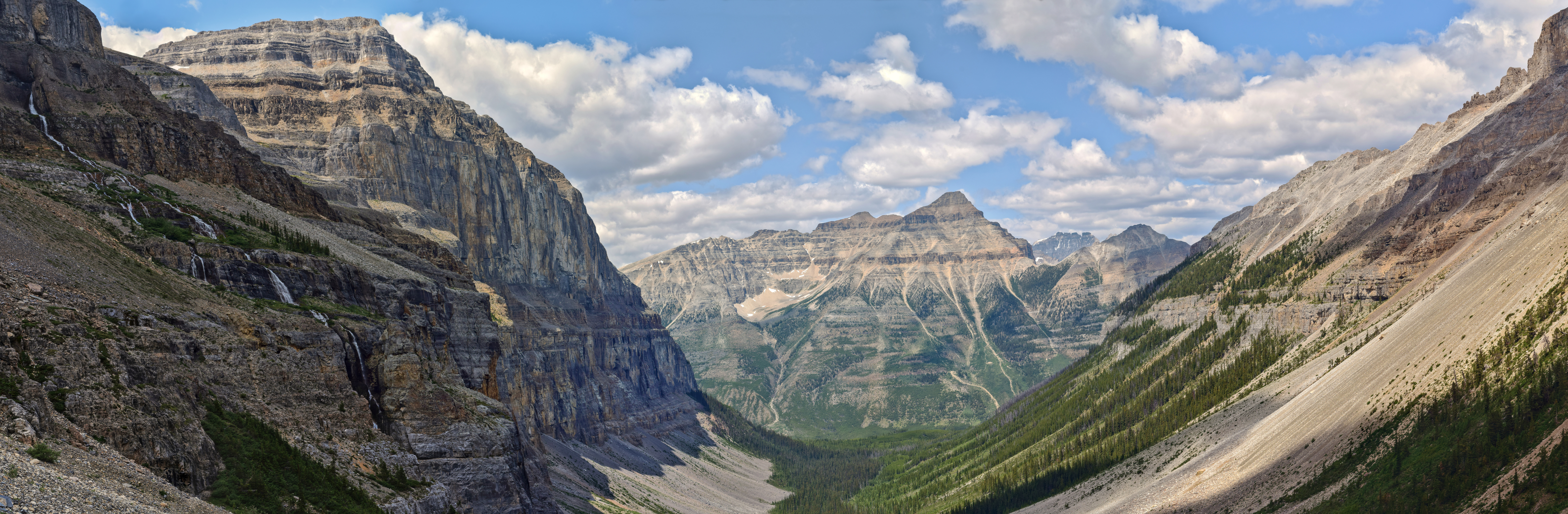
Southeast aspect of Mount Whymper seen from Stanley Glacier Trail
