= Josiah Wood Whymper =

English wood-engraver, illustrator, and watercolourist (1813–1903)

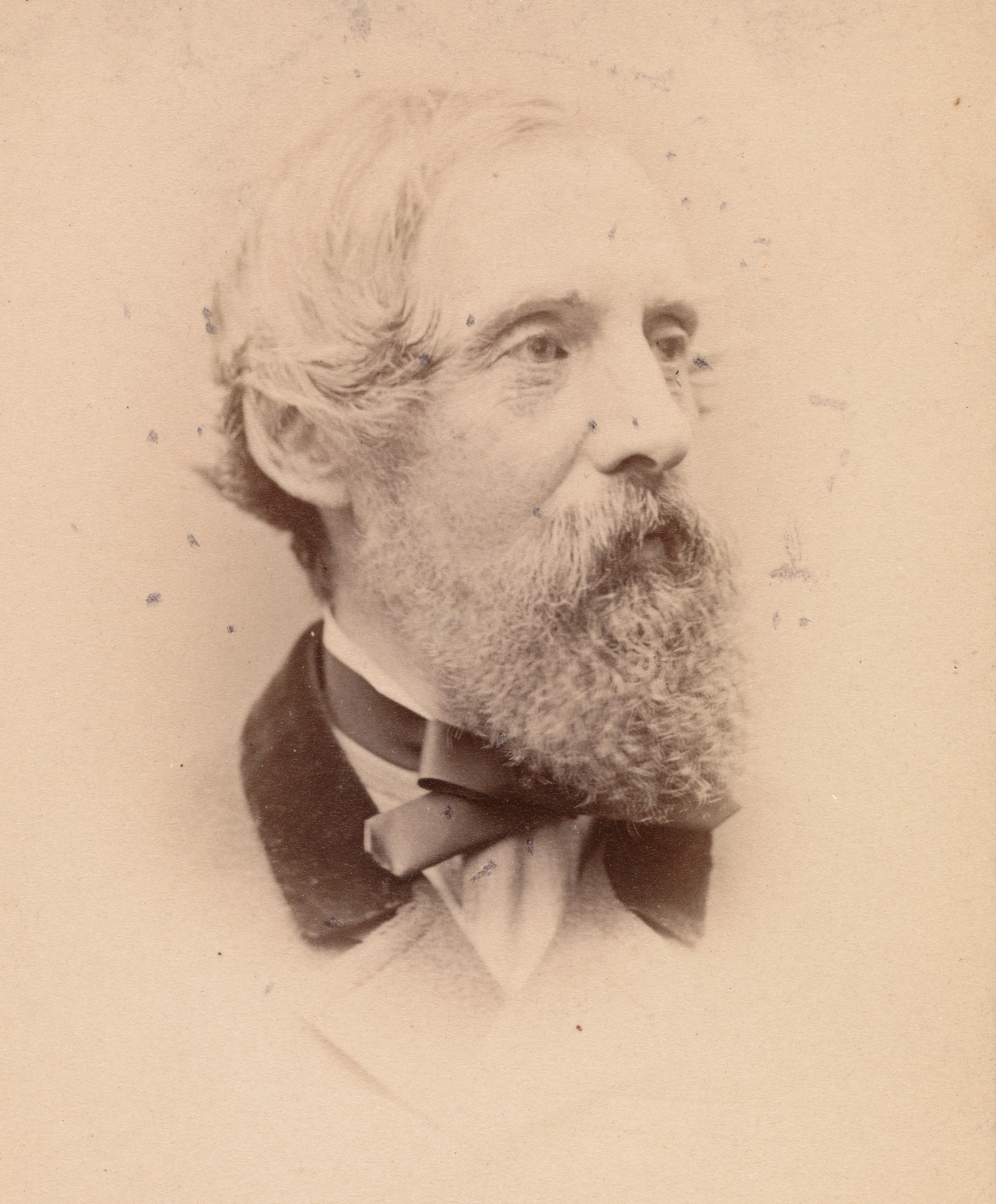
- Josiah Wood Whymper
- Born: 24 April 1813; Ipswich, England
- Died: 7 April 1903 (aged 89); Haslemere, England
- Education: William Collingwood Smith
- Known for: Wood engraving, illustration, watercolour
- Notable work: Engravings for British Birds in their Haunts
- Spouse: Emily Whymper (second)
- Elected: New Society of Painters in Water Colours

Josiah Wood Whymper RI (24 April 1813 – 7 April 1903) was a British wood-engraver, book illustrator and watercolourist.

== Early life and education ==
Born the son of a brewer, Whymper was apprenticed to a stonemason. He soon turned to drawing and painting, settled in London in 1829 and studied under William Collingwood Smith (1815–1887).

== Career as illustrator ==
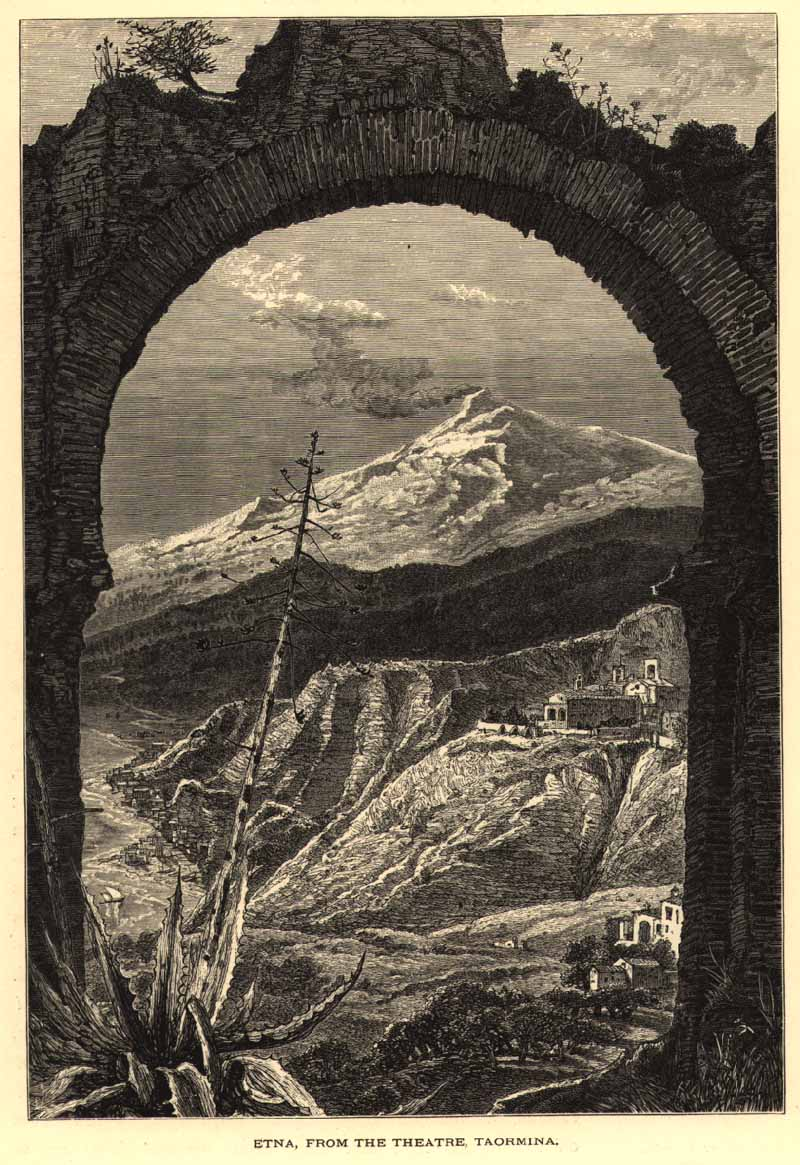
Engraving by Whymper: View from the Ancient Greek Theatre at Taormina

After having an etching of London Bridge published, he became well known as an illustrator and worked for Black (for the 1857 edition of poetic works of Walter Scott), John Murray, Cassell and other publishers. His wood-engraving enterprise became one of London's most successful. He also painted watercolours, specialising in riverscapes, and gave drawing classes to pupils such as Charles Keene (1823–1891), John William North (1842–1924), George John Pinwell (1842–1875) and Frederick Walker (1840–1875).

He also produced fine engravings of animals, fish, landscapes and wonders of the world for the Society for Promoting Christian Knowledge, sold for 3/4d penny plain, 2d pence coloured. In 1846, Whymper made thirty engravings about dramatic natural phenomena such as the aurora borealis, whirlpools and icebergs.

Whymper exhibited in the London and Provincial Galleries and was elected an associate of the New Society of Painters in Water Colours in 1854, becoming a full member in 1857.

Whymper's set of engravings for Charles Alexander Johns's British Birds in Their Haunts (1862) after drawings by Joseph Wolf is widely regarded as his finest work. He made some of the engravings for Henry Walter Bates's 1863 The Naturalist on the River Amazons. He also produced the wood engravings for the Life and Habits of Wild Animals (1873–74) with the help of his sons Charles, Frederick and Edward, and provided illustrations for Joseph Dalton Hooker's Himalayan Journals (1854) and David Livingstone's Narrative of an Expedition to the Zambesi (1865). He was in charge of the illustrations for Picturesque Europe (1875).

== Family and later life ==
Whymper was the father of eleven children including Edward Whymper (1840–1911), the alpinist, illustrator and wood-engraver, who made the first ascent of the Matterhorn in 1865 and engraved the illustrations for Howard Willoughby's Australian Pictures (1886). Other sons were Frederick Whymper (1838–1901), an artist and explorer, and Charles H. Whymper (1853–1941), who provided illustrations for books on travel, sport and natural history, including an edition of William Yarrell's A History of British Birds (1871–89) and the Birds of Egypt (1909).

His second wife was Emily Whymper.

Toward the end of his life, he lived in Haslemere in Surrey, where he died in 1903.

Examples of Whymper's work may be seen in the Victoria and Albert Museum, London.
