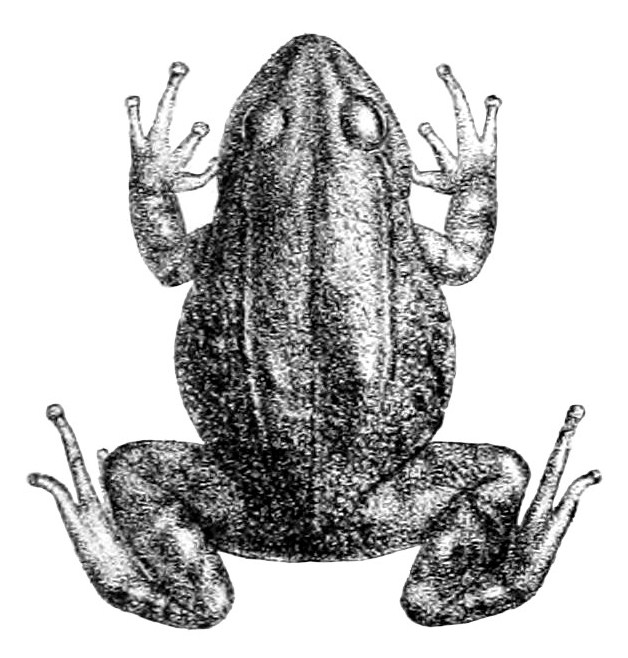

Conservation status
- Least Concern (IUCN 3.1)

Scientific classification
- Kingdom: Animalia
- Phylum: Chordata
- Class: Amphibia
- Order: Anura
- Family: Strabomantidae
- Genus: Pristimantis
- Species: P. curtipes

Binomial name
- Pristimantis curtipes (Boulenger, 1882)

Synonyms
- Eleutherodactylus curtipes (Boulenger, 1882); Eleutherodactylus anae Rivero, 1986; Hylodes whymperi Boulenger, 1882; Hyla chimboe Fowler, 1913

= Pristimantis curtipes =

Species of frog

Pristimantis curtipes is a species of frog in the family Strabomantidae. It is found in the Nariño Department of southern Colombia and in the Andes of Ecuador south to Desierto de Palmira (Chimborazo Province).

== Description ==
Pristimantis curtipes is a short-legged frog that shows large variation in adult size and colouration. Males measure 16–33 mm (0.63–1.30 in) and females 26–43 mm (1.0–1.7 in) in snout–vent length. Head is narrower than the body and wider than long. Tympanum is concealed. Dorsum bears low, flat warts and a pair of ill-defined dorsolateral folds. The colouration is highly variable but the ground color is usually dark gray or brown. Most specimens have indefinite darker mottling on the dorsum, striped in some individuals.

== Habitat ==
Pristimantis curtipes is a widely distributed and relatively common species. Its altitudinal range is 2,750–4,400 m (9,020–14,440 ft) asl, probably extending higher. It is found primarily in páramo habitats and, at lower end of its altitudinal range, in montane forests. When inactive, these frogs shelter under rocks on very humid grounds. The altitudinal range overlaps with Pristimantis unistrigatus; in similar habitats at lower altitudes Pristimantis curtipes is replaced by the latter.

== Conservation ==
Pristimantis curtipes is an adaptable species that is under no significant threat, although habitat loss remains a potential threat. It is present in a number of national parks and reserves in Ecuador, including the Cotopaxi and Llanganates National Parks.
