= Bergli Hut =

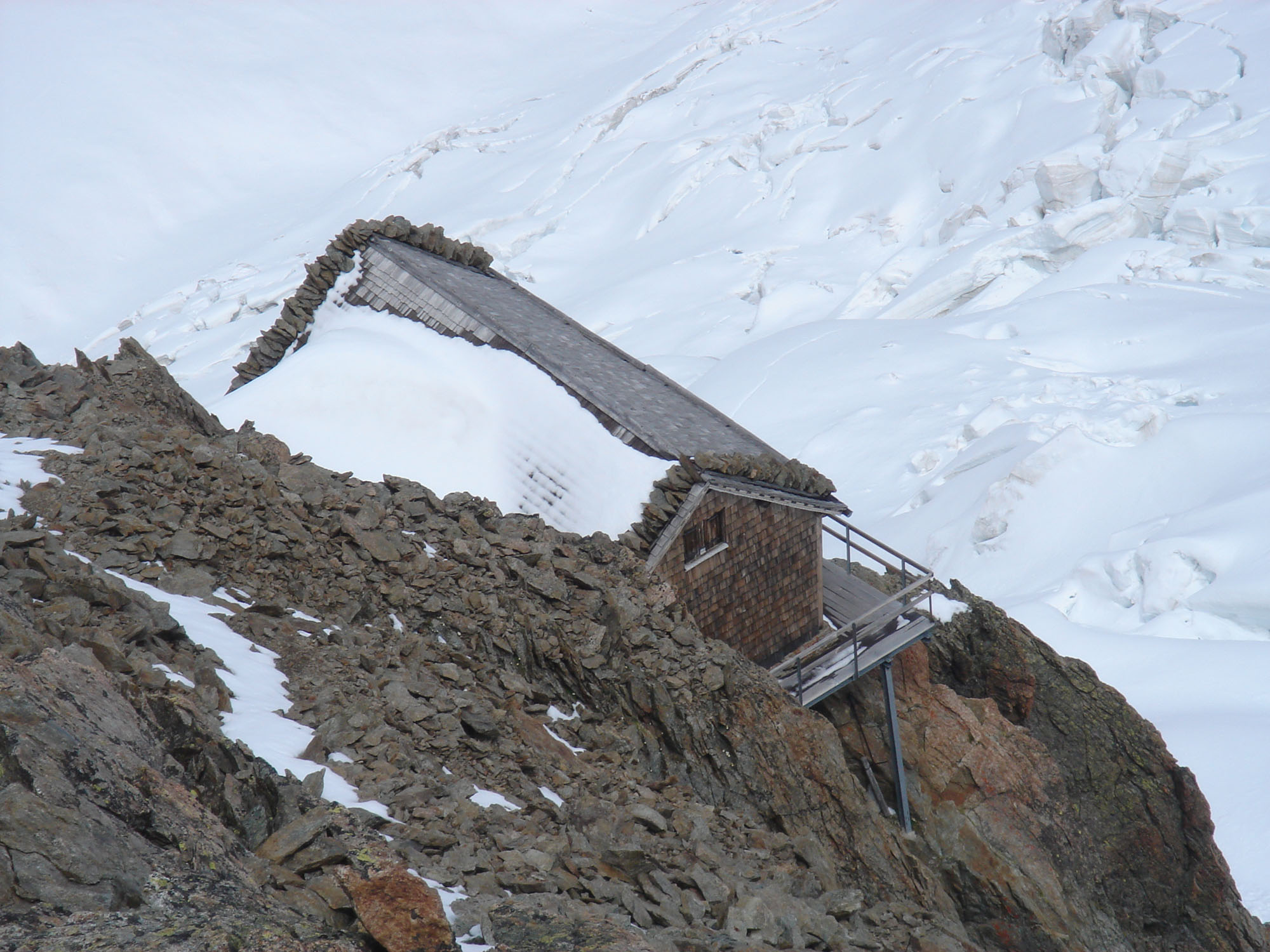
- The Bergli Hut with the Eismeer in background
- Interactive map of the Bergli Hut area

General information
- Coordinates: 46°34′00.5″N 8°01′14″E
- Elevation: 3,299 m (10,823 ft)

Website
- www.vs-wallis.ch/bern/huetverz/bergli.html

The Bergli Hut (German: Berglihütte or Bärglihütte) is a mountain hut of the Swiss Alpine Club, located south of Grindelwald in the canton of Bern. It lies at a height of 3,299 metres above sea level on a rocky outcrop of the Eismeer, the glacier at the eastern foot of the Eiger and the Mönch. The border with the canton of Valais runs 500 metres south of the hut.

The hut is set in a remote area and is accessible only to mountaineers as all accesses involve glacier crossing. The shortest access is from the Jungfraujoch train station.

== See also ==
- List of buildings and structures above 3000 m in Switzerland
