= Aiguille des Grands Charmoz =

Mountain in the Mont Blanc Massif in Haute-Savoie, France

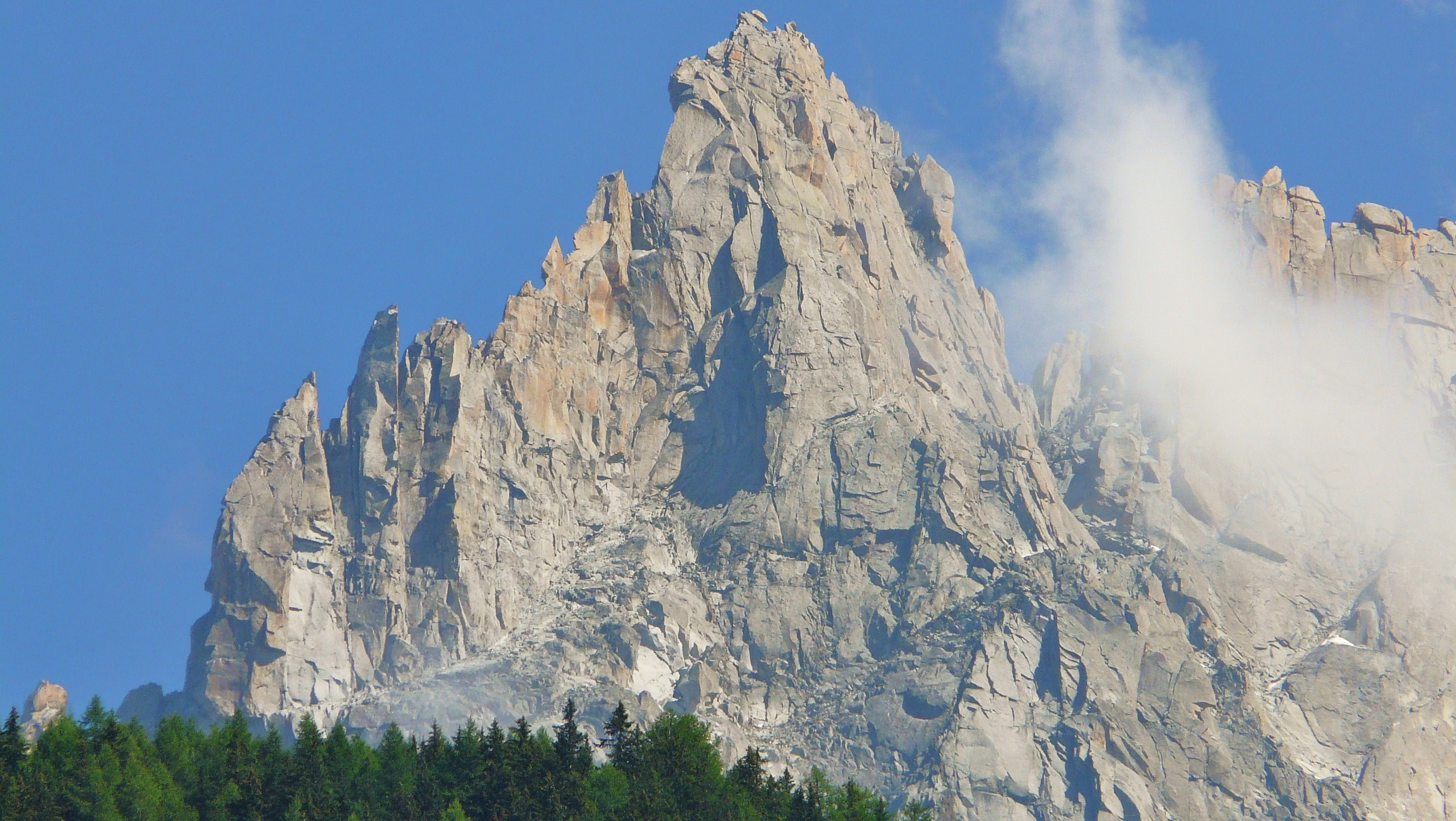

Highest point
- Elevation: 3,445 m (11,302 ft)
- Prominence: 122 m (400 ft)
- Isolation: 0.73 km (0.45 mi)
- Coordinates: 45°54′16″N 06°55′08″E

Geography
- Location within France
- Location: Haute-Savoie, France
- Parent range: Mont Blanc Massif

Climbing
- First ascent: 9 August 1885 by Henri Dunod and P. Vignon

The Aiguille des Grands Charmoz (3,445 m) is a mountain in the Mont Blanc Massif in Haute-Savoie, France.

== Geography ==
The granite spires of the Aiguille des Grands Charmoz are located between the Aiguille de l'M to the north and the Aiguille du Grépon to the south with the Mer de Glace to the east, it overlooks the Chamonix valley to the north-west. The Aiguille des Grands Charmoz is separated from the Aiguille du Grépon by the Charmoz-Grépon couloir.

== Climbing history ==
The first ascent was made on 9 August 1885 by Henri Dunod and P. Vignon with the guides J. Desailloux, F. Folliguet, F. and G. Simond who climbed the Charmoz-Grépon couloir.

The first ascent of the north-west top 3,435 m (11,270 ft) had been made five years earlier, on 15 July 1880, by Mummery with the guides Alexander Burgener and Benedikt Venetz, they had started up the Charmoz-Grépon couloir but had then moved left to tackle a line leading to what they thought was the highest point.

The Grands Charmoz-Grepon traverse is one of the classic routes on the Chamonix Aiguille.

The first ascent of the north face of the Grands Charmoz was made in 1931 by Willo Welzenbach and Willy Merkl. They endured "a long and sustained epic in atrocious weather". The two climbers started their ascent on 30 June but after a night on the climb they were caught out by bad weather and had to face a second night out before they were able to descend. On 5 July they returned to their previous high point and again became storm-bound high on the face, after enduring four days and nights in the storm they managed to reach the summit and then return to Montenvers, above Chamonix, where no one had expected them to survive the ordeal. By 1994 the Welzenbach route on the Charmoz was unclimbable in summer, having "been reduced to a sliver of ice high up on the face", little more than "a grotesque and suicidal heap of rubble".
