= Vancouver Island Exploring Expedition =

In 1864 the Vancouver Island Exploring Expedition explored areas of the Colony of Vancouver Island outside the capital of Victoria and settlements in Nanaimo and the Cowichan Valley that were then unknown. The expedition went as far north as the Comox Valley over four and one half months during the summer and fall of 1864. The result was the discovery of gold in one location leading to a minor gold rush, the discovery of coal in the Comox Valley, an historical record of contact with the existing native population, the naming of many geographic features and a series of sketches recording images of the time.

== Mission and personnel ==
The need for exploration of unsettled areas of Vancouver Island had been the subject of comment in the colonial press in the early 1860s but it was not until the new Governor, Arthur Edward Kennedy arrived in March 1864 that the project had a sponsor. In April 1864 he announced that the government would contribute two dollars for every dollar contributed by the public.

From his arrival in Victoria in May 1863, Robert Brown had been working in the colony as a seed collector for the British Columbia Botanical Society of Edinburgh on a meagre income. He had explored the Alberni Inlet including Sproat Lake (which he named) and Great Central Lake. He named some of the surrounding geographic features for his sponsors. Between May 28 and July 8 he explored from Barkley Sound to Kyuquot and Nootka Island. After returning to Victoria, he crossed the Strait of Juan de Fuca to Port Townsend, Port Angeles and Whidbey Island and went as far as Seattle. In September 1863 he travelled to Lilloett and New Westminster followed by a return trip to Port Alberni where he established the length of Great Central Lake. Although his seed collection disappointed his sponsors, the experience and the reputation he earned in Victoria was recognized on June 1, 1864 when he was appointed as commander of the Vancouver Island Exploring Expedition. Brown considered his mission to report on the topography, soil, timber and resources however his sponsors were more interested in whether gold would be found.

The group he assembled included Frederick Whymper who produced a series of drawings of the scenes observed during the expedition. Two members of the recently disbanded Royal Engineers, Peter John Leech (1826–99) who was second in command and John Meade were part of the group. There were two university graduates, Henry Thomas Lewis and Alexander Barnston. John Buttle (1838–1908), John Foley and Ranald MacDonald (1824–94) made up the rest. Following the resignation of John Foley, the VIEE Committee on July 30 decided that "two efficient miners" should be appointed as replacements. On August 30 Richard Drew and William Hooper were engaged. They added Tomo Antoine, the son of an Iroquois voyageur at their first stop in Cowichan. MacDonald was the oldest of the group at 40. Brown, the commander, was 22.

== Explorations ==
After arriving in Cowichan aboard HMS Grappler, the group proceeded up the Cowichan River and the length of Cowichan Lake where they divided into two groups. One, led by Leech, was to travel from the south side of the lake to Port San Juan. The other, led by Brown, followed the Nitinat River to the west coast to meet the Leech party at Port San Juan for fresh supplies which were to be brought in by boat from Victoria. Brown returned by boat to Victoria leaving Leech to lead the remaining group temporarily. While Brown was away, the group found gold at what would become Leechtown.

On August 1, the group continued. Brown went on to Nanaimo, then by boat to Comox and from there across the island to Alberni. While in the Comox Valley, Brown discovered coal. Members of expedition insisted that Browns River be named after him at the location where coal was found. Leech's group took a more difficult route across the island. The two groups met in Alberni in September. After exploring in that area, they crossed the island to the Qualicum River and then travelled by canoe to Nanaimo to board the Grappler. From there, they returned to Victoria where they arrived, as local celebrities, on October 21.

== Observations ==
Brown described the settlers he found in the Cowichan Valley, Chemainus, and Comox areas, who had arrived to pre-empt land under the Vancouver Island Land Proclamation of September 1862 (single men were allowed 100 acres (0.40 km^{2}), married men 150 acres (0.61 km^{2}) plus 10 acres (40,000 m^{2}) for each child under 18 after 2 years of occupation). Unlike some other observers, Brown described the residents as ill-suited to life as farmers, having come as a result of the Gold Rush. He described the few settlers then present as unenthusiastic and living in poverty.

What was described as a first class trail between Nanaimo and Comox had been completed in May 1863 but Joseph Despard Pemberton had scrapped the idea of turning the trail into a road because the Colony of Vancouver Island could not afford the $70,000 it was expected to cost. As a result, the road from Victoria was completed only as far as Chemainus. When Brown explored up the island in August 1864, he found the trail blocked by windfalls and washouts, although he did find one bridge remaining at the Qualicum River.

The motivation for support of the expedition was to find gold and promote Victoria, whose growth had stopped after the 1858 gold rush ended. Some gold had been found at the Goldstream River in 1863, and the expedition found some at Leechtown. The expedition also performed mapping and collected information on the mineral and agricultural potential of the island.

Brown's journals include a collection of native myths and legends and one of the earliest accounts of a potlach ceremony.

== See also ==
- Russian-American telegraph
- Adam Grant Horne
- Vancouver Island: Exploration, 1864 (Google eBook)
