= Frederick Whymper =

British artist and explorer

Frederick Whymper

Frederick Whymper (20 July 1838 in London – 26 November 1901) was a British artist and explorer.

== Biography ==
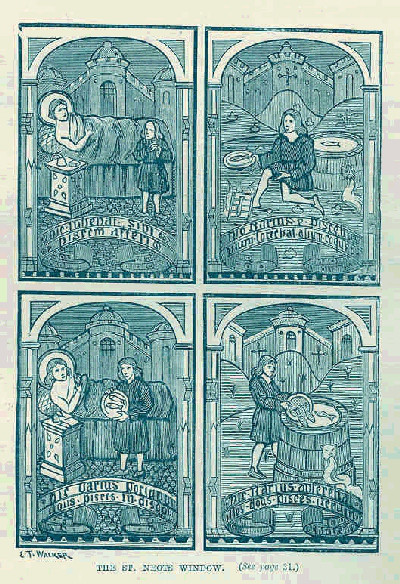
A stained glass window at Eynesbury, Cambridgeshire, as drawn by Frederick Whymper

Whymper was the eldest son of Elizabeth Whitworth Claridge and Josiah Wood Whymper, a celebrated wood-engraver and artist. His younger brother Edward Whymper was a renowned alpinist who made the first ascent of the Matterhorn in 1865.

In his youth, Whymper was a talented artist working to produce engravings for publication and having his landscapes on exhibit at the Royal Academy of Arts in London from 1859 to 1861.

He travelled to Victoria, British Columbia in 1862 and to the Cariboo in the following year. In 1864 he joined road builders in the area of Bute Inlet on the Pacific Coast, leaving shortly before the Chilcotin War.

Many of his early travels were by steamship; his drawings include volcanoes on Kamchatka and Alaskan glaciers. While in the far north, Whymper served on the Vancouver Island Exploring Expedition and the Western Union Telegraph Expedition (1865), spending the winter of 1866 at Nulato, Alaska with W.H. Dall and travelling up the Yukon River to Fort Yukon, where he witnessed the first American flag being raised over the new territory of Alaska.

In November 1867, Whymper arrived back in England where his account of his travels, Travel and Adventure in the Territory of Alaska, was published in 1868. In 1869, he went back to the United States, by way of New York City to San Francisco and worked on the staff of the newspaper Alta California. City directories describe him as an artist and mining engineer, and in 1871 he was a founding member of the San Francisco Art Association. He returned to England at some point, publishing The Heroes of the Arctic and their Adventures and The Sea: Its Stirring Story of Adventure, Peril and Heroism, prior to his death in London on 26 November 1901 by what is listed as "failure of the heart, probably due to indigestion, arising from sedentary pursuits", in his obituary.

Mount Whymper, north of Lake Cowichan in British Columbia, is named in honour of the early explorer, artist and writer. Another taller Mount Whymper in British Columbia is named after his brother Edward, who was the first to climb it.

== Sources ==
- Dall, William H. (1898). The Yukon Territory: The Narrative of W. H. Dall, Leader of the Expedition to Alaska in 1866–1868.
- Elms, "Lindsay (1996). Beyond Nootka: A Historical Perspective of Vancouver Island Mountains. Misthorn Press. ISBN 0-9680159-0-5.
- Gilmore, Berenice (1980). Artists Overland: A Visual Record of British Columbia, 1793–1886. Burnaby Art Gallery. Burnaby, B.C.
- Hayman, John (1972). "Frederick Whymper" in Dictionary of Canadian Biography. Vol. 10. University of Toronto Press. Toronto, Ontario.
- Whymper, Frederick (1868). Travel and Adventure in the Territory of Alaska. John Murray. London, England.
