= Albert F. Mummery =

English mountaineer and author (1855–1895)

Fred Mummery
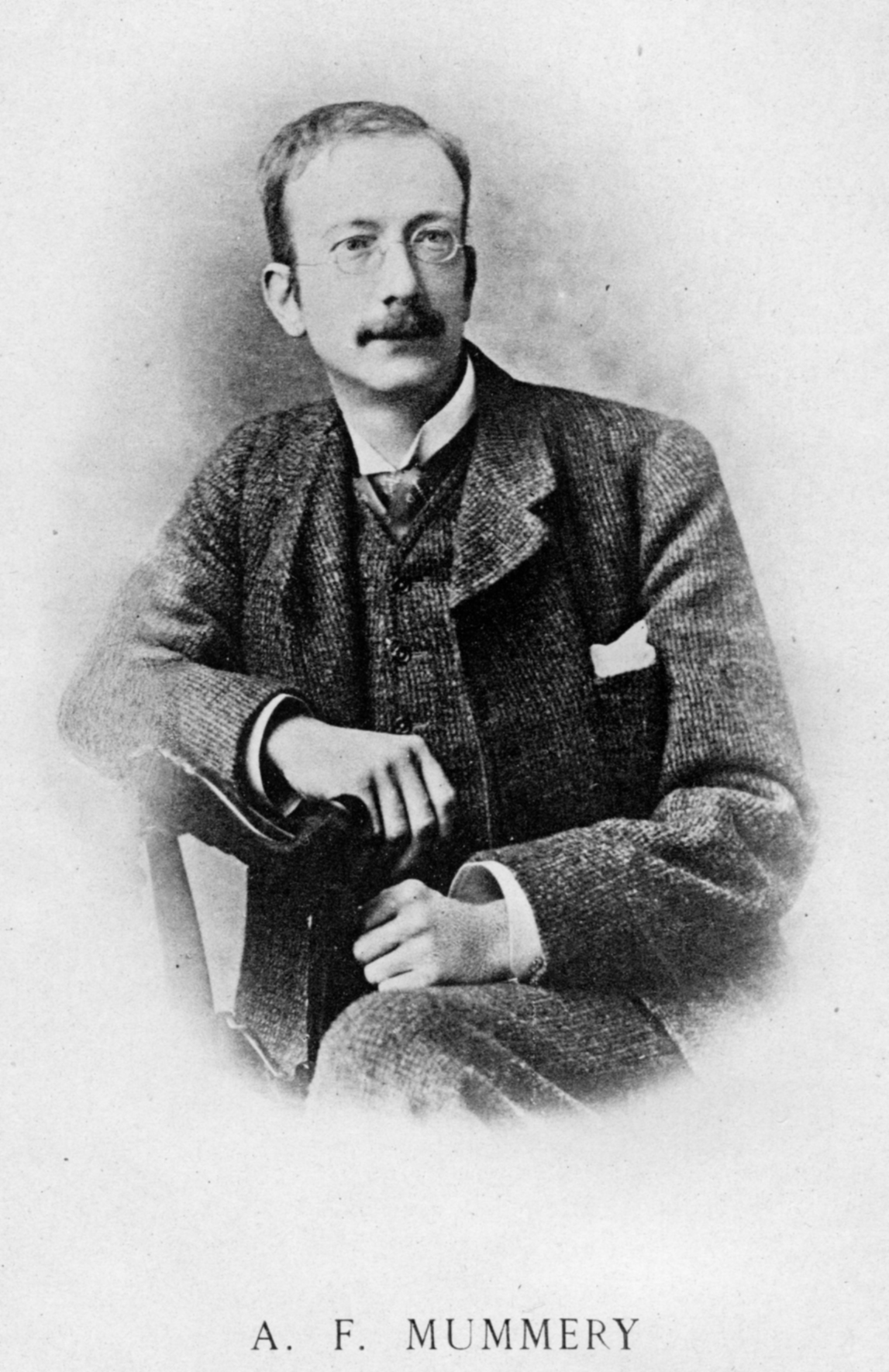
- Born: 10 September 1855; Dover, England
- Died: 24 August 1895 (aged 39); Nanga Parbat, British India
- Occupations: Mountaineer, author
- Spouse: Mary

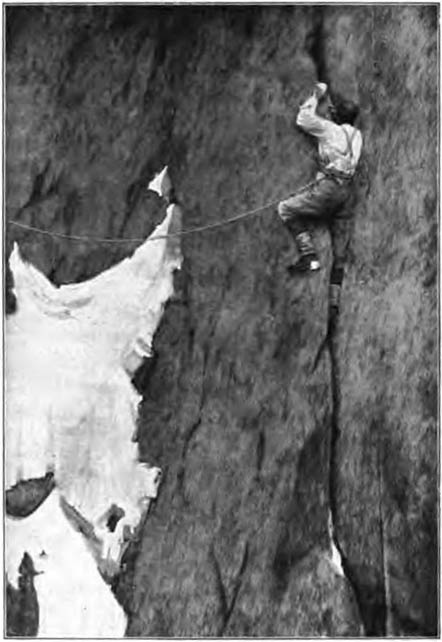
Albert F. Mummery, mountaineering

Albert Frederick Mummery (10 September 1855, Dover, Kent, England – 24 August 1895, Nanga Parbat), was an English mountaineer and author. Although most notable for his many and varied first ascents put up in the Alps, Mummery, along with J. Norman Collie, Geoffrey Hastings, and two Gurkhas are also the first men in recorded history to have attempted to summit one of the Himalayan eight-thousanders.

Their innovative, light-weight endeavour upon Nanga Parbat in 1895 proved ill-fated; Mummery and both Gurkhas died in an avalanche whilst reconnoitering the mountain's Rakhiot Face. The first man to summit on Nanga Parbat, the legendary Austrian mountaineer Hermann Buhl, described Mummery as "one of the greatest mountaineers of all time".

== Life ==
Mummery's father was a tanner and mayor of Dover. The tanning business was prosperous enough for Mummery to devote most of his energies to climbing and economics. He became a friend of J. A. Hobson, and they collaborated on The Physiology of Industry (1889), which argued that because of economies' tendencies towards over-saving - and this being a cause of depressions – the economy required intervention to achieve stability.

== Mountaineer ==
Mummery is best remembered for his pioneering efforts in mountaineering. Initially, he climbed with mountain guides, but with his companions William Cecil Slingsby, Geoffrey Hastings and J. Norman Collie he was part of the movement which revolutionized alpinism by the practice of guideless climbing. He invented the Mummery tent, a type of tent used in the early days of mountaineering.

He made a series of remarkable first ascents, most notably the Aiguille du Grépon (which features a crack named after him), the Dent du Requin, the Grands Charmoz, the Teufelsgrat on the Täschhorn, the Dürrenhorn and the Zmutt ridge of the Matterhorn, which he ascended on 3 September 1879 with the guides Alexander Burgener, J. Petrus and A. Gentinetta. In 1894, he led his friend, the young Duke of the Abruzzi, to the top of the Matterhorn by the same route, together with John Norman Collie.

Mummery occasionally climbed with his wife Mary Petherick, or with his friend Lily Bristow, who shared lodgings with Mummery's sister-in law for a period in the 1890s.

In 1880, Mummery and Burgener were repelled while trying to make the first ascent of the much-coveted Dent du Géant, being forced back by some difficult slabs. This provoked Mummery to exclaim prophetically: 'Absolutely inaccessible by fair means!'

In 1895, Collie, Hastings and Mummery were the first climbers to attempt the Himalayan 8,000 metre peak, Nanga Parbat, the ninth highest mountain in the world. On this pioneering lightweight expedition, the mountain claimed the first of its many victims, when Mummery and two Gurkhas, Ragobir Thapa and Goman Singh, fell and were killed by an avalanche while reconnoitering the Rakhiot Face. Their bodies were never found. The story of this disastrous expedition is told in J. Norman Collie's book From the Himalaya to Skye. In 1898, Collie named Mount Mummery in the Canadian Rockies after his climbing companion.

Mummery left behind a legacy of some of the most well-regarded routes in the Alps. His book My Climbs in the Alps and Caucasus, is considered as one of the enduring classics of mountaineering literature.

It has frequently been noticed that all mountains appear doomed to pass through the three stages: An inaccessible peak - The most difficult ascent in the Alps - An easy day for a lady.

— Albert Frederick Mummery, My Climbs in the Alps and Caucasus
