= Roche Faurio =

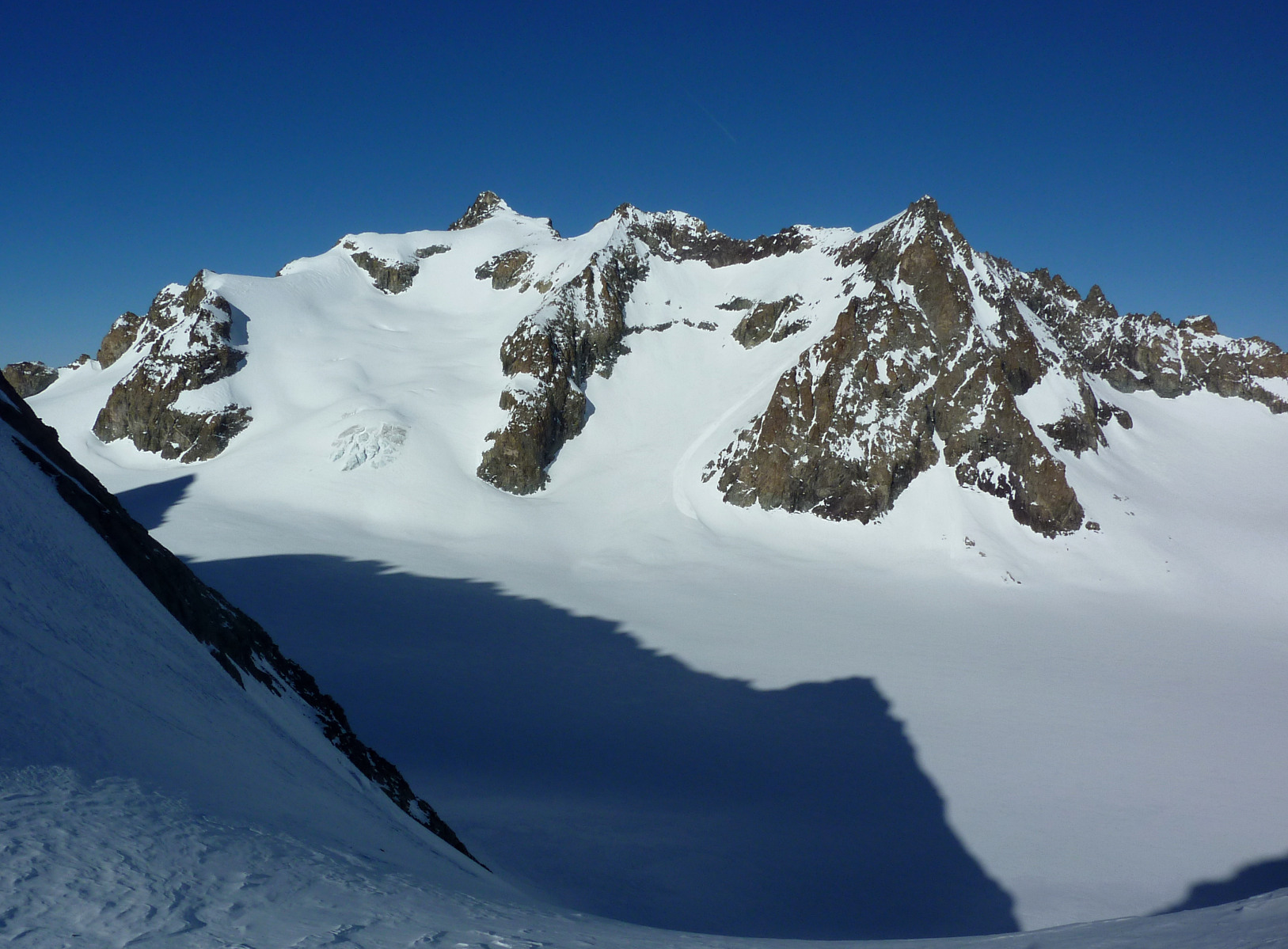
- Roche Faurio on the left

Highest point
- Elevation: 3,730 m (12,240 ft)
- Listing: Alpine mountains above 3000 m
- Coordinates: 44°56′30″N 6°21′26″E

Geography
- Location within Alps
- Location: Isère, France
- Parent range: Dauphiné Alps

Climbing
- First ascent: 1873

Roche Faurio is a mountain in the French Alps with a peak elevation of 3,730 metres (12,240 ft). It is part of the Massif des Écrins in the Dauphiné Alps in Isère, France

It lies in front of the north face of the Barre des Écrins adjacent to the Glacier Blanc. The mountain lies inside Écrins National Park. It is a popular summit with hikers, taking about four hours to climb from the Écrins Hut, and ski mountaineers.
