= Glacier Noir =

Glacier in France

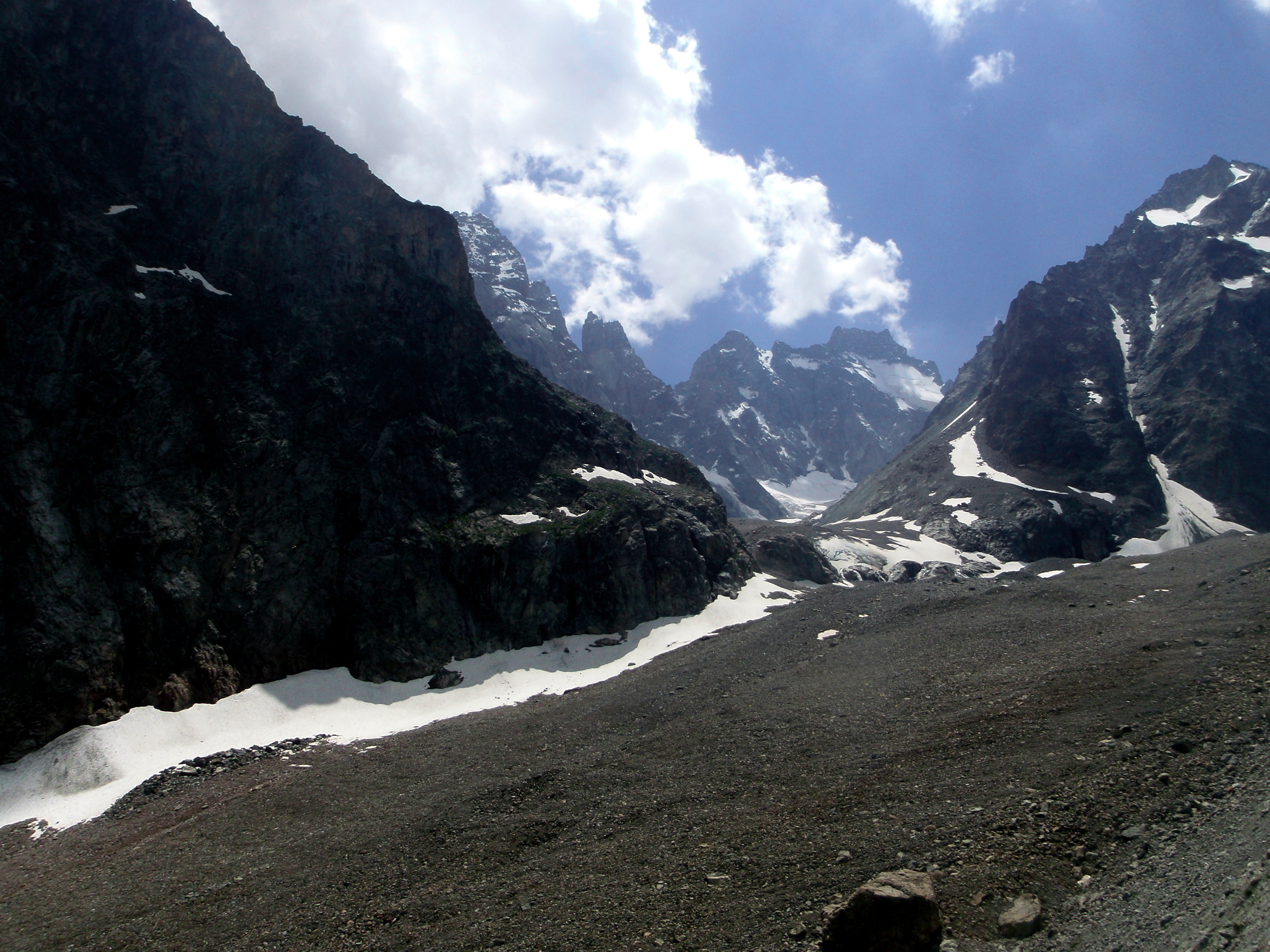
- The Glacier Noir with the Ailefroide in the background

- Location within France
- Type: Valley glacier
- Location: Hautes Alpes, France (Massif des Écrins, Western Alps)
- Coordinates: 44°54′54″N 6°23′0″E
- Area: 5.95 km^{2} (2.30 sq mi) (1965)
- Length: 5.5 km (3.4 mi) (1965)
- Highest elevation: 3,300 m
- Lowest elevation: 2,200 m

The Glacier Noir (French for "black glacier") is a glacier in the Massif des Écrins in the French Alps. It is located in the département of Hautes-Alpes.

== Geography ==
Of all the great glaciers in the Oisans region, the Glacier Noir is the one that descends furthest into the valley. This is thanks to favourable topography and the fact that the lower tongue of the glacier is entirely covered with ablation moraine. As a result, it is better screened from direct sunshine than, for example, its neighbour, the Glacier Blanc ("white glacier").

Until at least 1866 the Glacier Noir and Glacier Blanc were combined into a single glacial system above the Pré de Madame Carle. But whilst the foot of the Glacier Blanc has currently retreated to a height of around 2,400 m, the snout of the Glacier Noir descends a further 200 metres in height to about 2,200 m.

A glacier covered in moraine debris is generally referred to in French as a glacier noir.

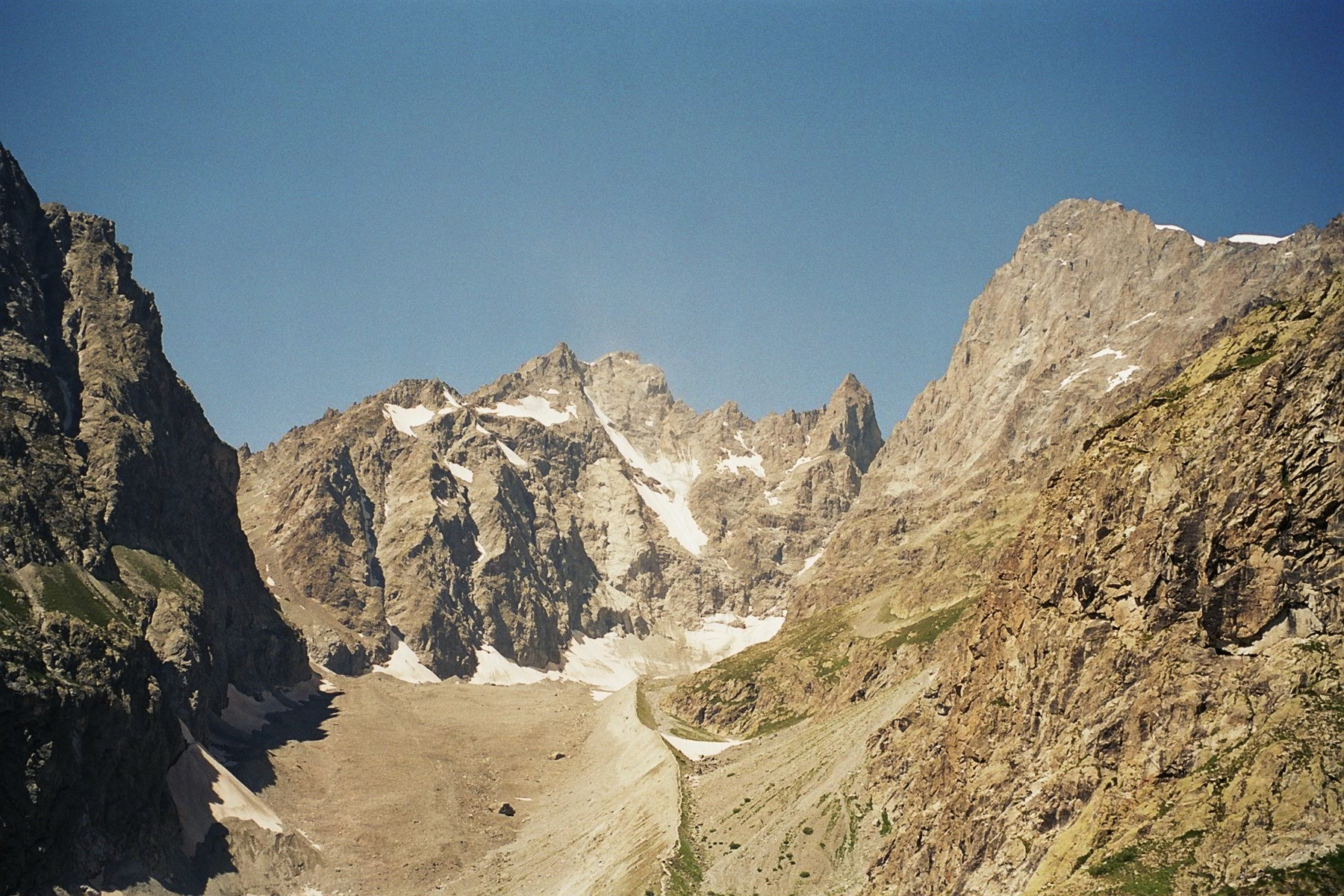
The Glacier Noir with Pic Coolidge and the Barre des Écrins

The Glacier Noir is fed from two high-altitude firn basins. The northern branch (branche septentrionale) is in turn fed from the bowl below the Col des Avalanches, at the foot of Pic Coolidge and the Barre des Écrins, the southwesternmost four-thousander of the Alps. From here it flows below the south face of the Crête de l'Encoula (also: Crête de l'Encula), a crest that runs from the Barre to the Pointe du Serre Subeyran. The great majority of the rubble that covers the lower section of the glacier is transported from its northern branch.

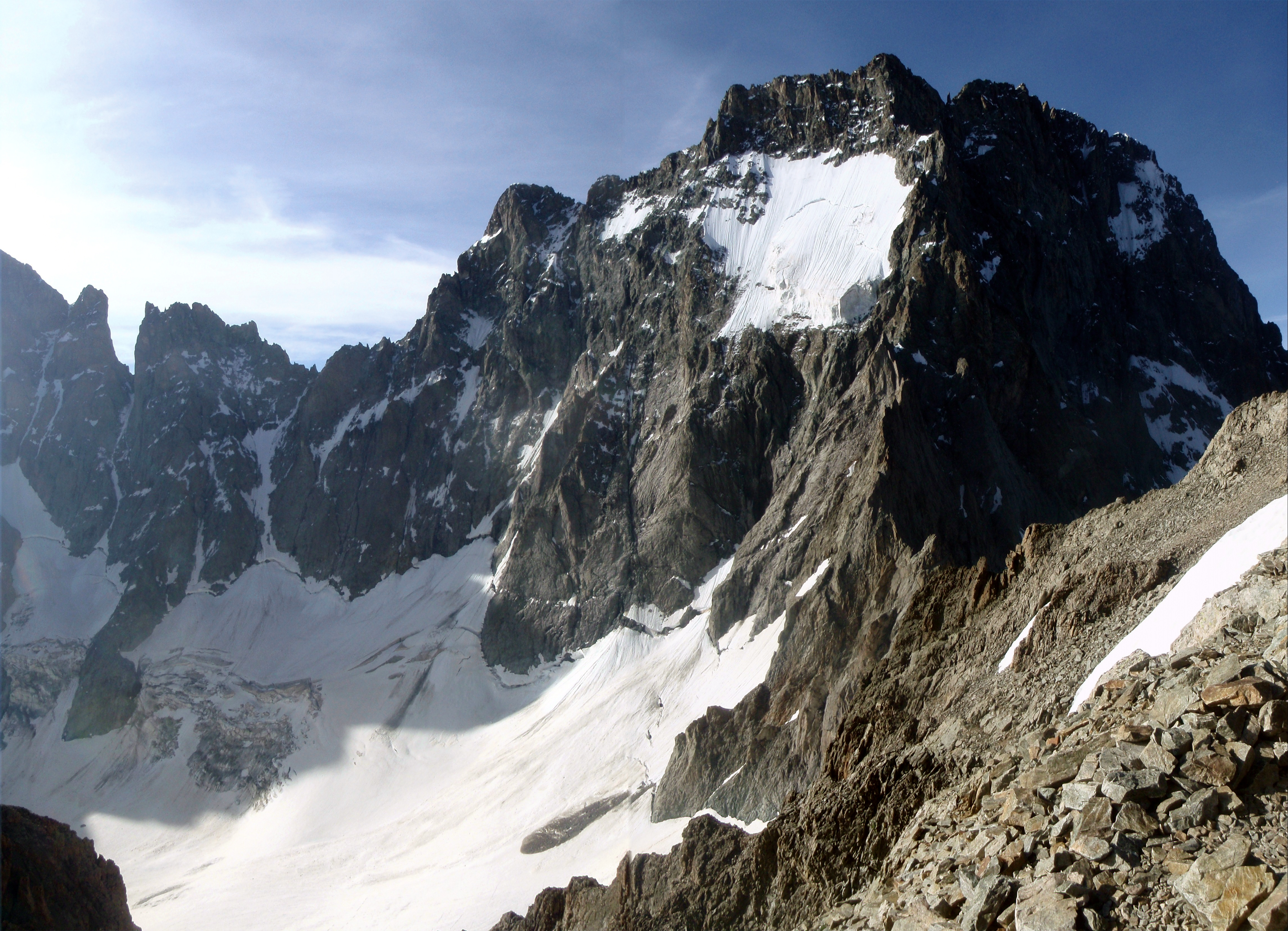
The Ailefroide (3,956 m) above the southern glacier branch

The southern branch (branche méridionale) originates between the faces of the Ailefroide and Pic Coolidge, below the Col de Coste Rouge (3,192 m) and the Col de la Temple (3,322 m). The steep north faces of the Ailefroide, Pic du Coup de Sabre and Pic Sans Nom tower 1,000 to 1,500 metres above the glacier. The arête, which runs over these peaks eastwards to Mont Pelvoux, is also called the Grand Muraille du Glacier Noir. Five summits along this crest (Ailefroide Central, Pointe Fourastier, Pic Sans Nom, Pointe Puiseux and Pointe Durand) exceed the 3,900-metre.

The two ice streams of the Glacier Noir merge at a height of over 2,400 m. However, the southern arm is about to retreat over the boundary between the lower basin and upper bowl, which will separate the glacier into distinct lower and upper sections. Currently the combined tongue of ice flows from its junction, descending another good 200 metres in height, and ends beneath the northern foothills of Mont Pelvoux. It is about 400 metres wide at this point and a high and steep lateral moraine towers over it on the left-hand (northern) side, across which a climbing path runs from the Pré de Madame Carle, above the village of Ailefroide.

Measurements are more difficult than on other glaciers as a result of the covering of moraine. In 1965 the glacier was about 5.5 km long from head to snout and had an area of just under 6 km^{2}. Due to its covering of moraine, variations in these dimensions are less than those of other glaciers of similar size that are not so covered.

The meltwaters of the Glacier Noir pass down the Torrent du Glacier Noir, the Gyr, the Gyronde, the Durance and finally the Rhône into the Mediterranean Sea.

== Access ==
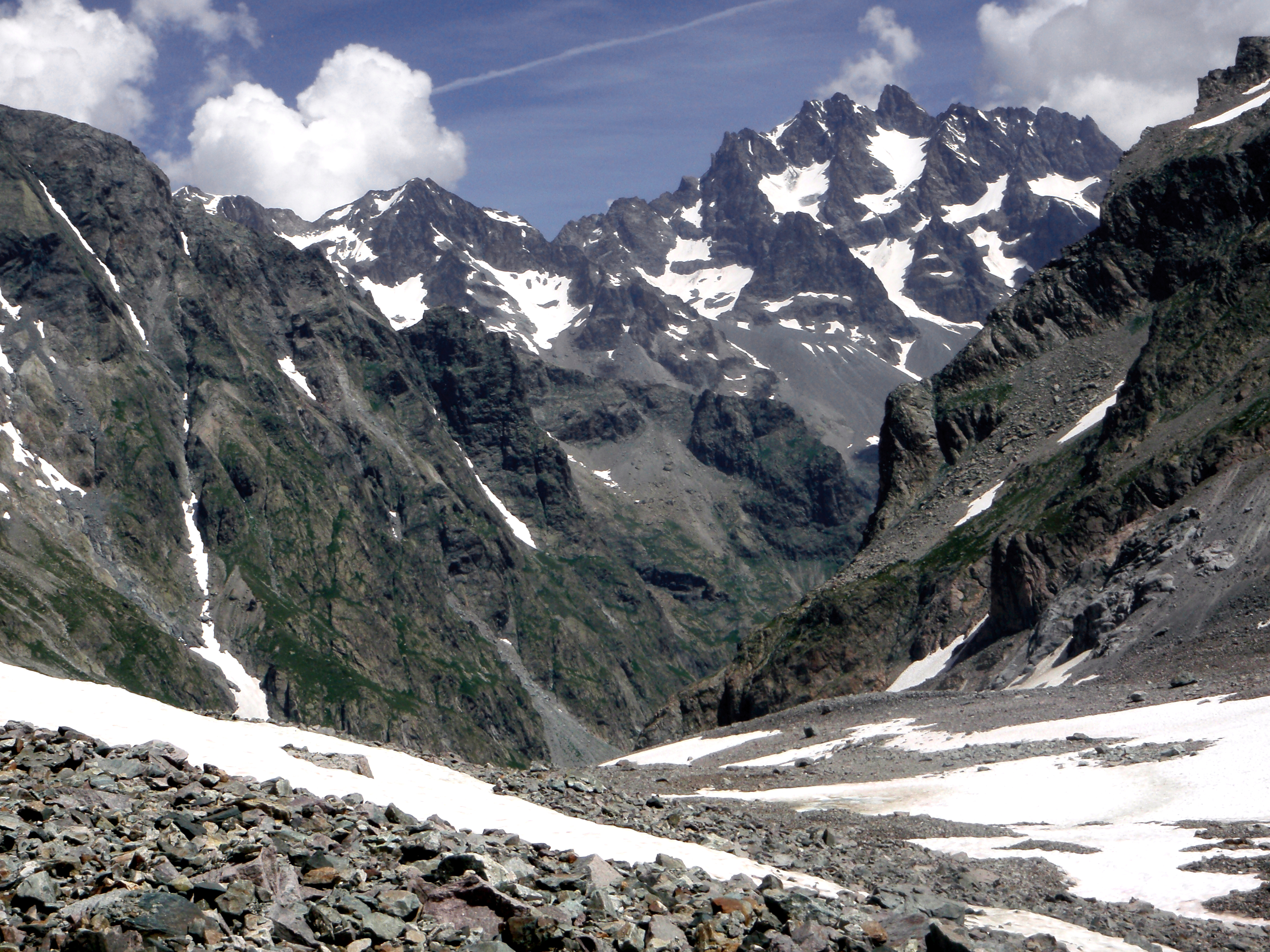
On the Glacier Noir, with the Montagne des Agneaux (background)

The glacier may be easily reached on foot from the hut of Refuge Cézanne at the Pré de Madame Carle, where the road from the climber's village of Ailefroide ends in the Vallouise at a large car park. Initially following the path to the Refuge du Glacier Blanc, it bears left where the paths fork and reaches the lateral moraine of the glacier on which there is a route high above the glacier on that side.

From La Bérarde, another alpinist centre in the Écrins Massif, the Col de la Temple offers a high, but comparatively easy crossing into the Vallouise for experienced glacier walkers. The climbing path runs over the southern branch of the Glacier Noir and then makes for the junction of both glacial arms before crossing the northern branch to the lateral moraine on the opposite side. The Refuge Temple-Écrins in the Haut Vénéon may be used as a base.

== Historic development ==
As already mentioned, the Glacier Noir and Glacier Blanc used to form a single glacial system. During the Small Ice Age the combined ice mass reached its maximum extent in 1815 and ended roughly at the height of the present-day Cézanne Hut (1,874 m). About a kilometre further down the valley is the old terminal moraine of Fontfroide, relic of an advance of the Glacier Noir and Glacier Blanc from the time before the 16th century. After the retreat of the glacier, vegetation gradually returned on the flat river meadows and created the majestic landscape of the Pré de Madame Carle.
