= Roche Méane =

Summit in the French Alps

Coordinates: 44.9703°N 6.3353°E

Roche Méane is a two-summit peak in the Massif des Écrins in the French Alps. It is located on the crest between Barre des Écrins (4,102 metres (13,458 ft)) and La Meije (3,983 metres (13,068 ft)). The west summit is 3,728 metres (12,231 ft) high and is called Pic Maître; it is on the border between the Provence-Alpes-Côte d'Azur region of the département of Hautes-Alpes and the Rhône-Alpes region of the département of Isère. The east summit is 3,712 metres (12,178 ft) high and is entirely within Hautes-Alpes. The two summits are located in the small massif of La Grande Ruine, the highest summit of which is that of Pointe Brevoort (3,765 metres (12,352 ft)), which is next to Roche Méane. Below the summits are rocky cliffs and three glaciers: the Clot des Cavales, the Grande Ruine glacier, and the Supérieur des Agneaux. In 1907 Baedeker described the mountain as a "very difficult" two-and-a-half-hour ascent from this last.

The Société des touristes du Dauphiné maintains a travellers' refuge on the crest, reached in four and a half hours from Alpe de Villar d'Arène.
