= History of the highest point in France =

The history of the highest point in France consists of expeditions to survey the highest summits in France and changes in the highest point of France due to territorial transfers.

== Expedition on the mont Pelvoux (1828) ==
In 1828, an expedition led by captain Durand is in charge of checking that the mont Pelvoux is the highest point of the massif des Écrins in the French Alps. They reached the pointe Durand, at 3932m, called at that time pic de la Pyramide, and they realised that the pic des Écrins, which is now called Barre des Écrins, is higher.

== Savoy annexion ==
With the Treaty of Turin in 1860, which expanded French Territory (by adding the Duchies of Savoy and Nice), the highest point becomes Mont Blanc, 4810m.
