= Pic Sans Nom =

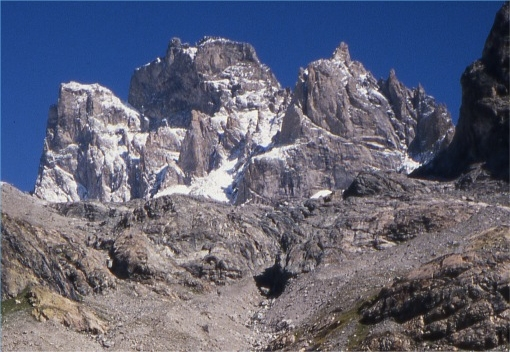
- Southern side of the Pic Sans Nom from the Sélé glacier

Highest point
- Elevation: 3,913 m (12,838 ft)
- Prominence: 340 m (1,120 ft)
- Isolation: 1.06 km (0.66 mi)
- Listing: Alpine mountains above 3000 m
- Coordinates: 44°53′36″N 6°23′00″E

Geography
- Location within France
- Location: Hautes-Alpes, France
- Parent range: Dauphiné Alps

Climbing
- First ascent: 10 July 1877 by J.-B. Colgrove, Richard Pendlebury and Gabriel and Josef Spectenhauser
- Easiest route: SE slopes, PD

The Pic Sans Nom (3,913 m) (Nameless Peak) is a mountain in the Massif des Écrins in the French Alps. It lies in the middle of the steep mountain mass that runs south-west from Mont Pelvoux to the Ailefroide.

Its steep and extensive northern precipices are bounded by the Glacier Noir; its southern slopes, providing the only relatively easy means of access, are bounded by the Glacier du Coup de Sabre and the Glacier de Sialouze. The Pic du Coup de Sabre (3,699 m) to its south-west is considered part of the Pic Sans Nom.

== See also ==
- List of mountains of the Alps above 3000 m
