= Ailefroide =

Mountain in France

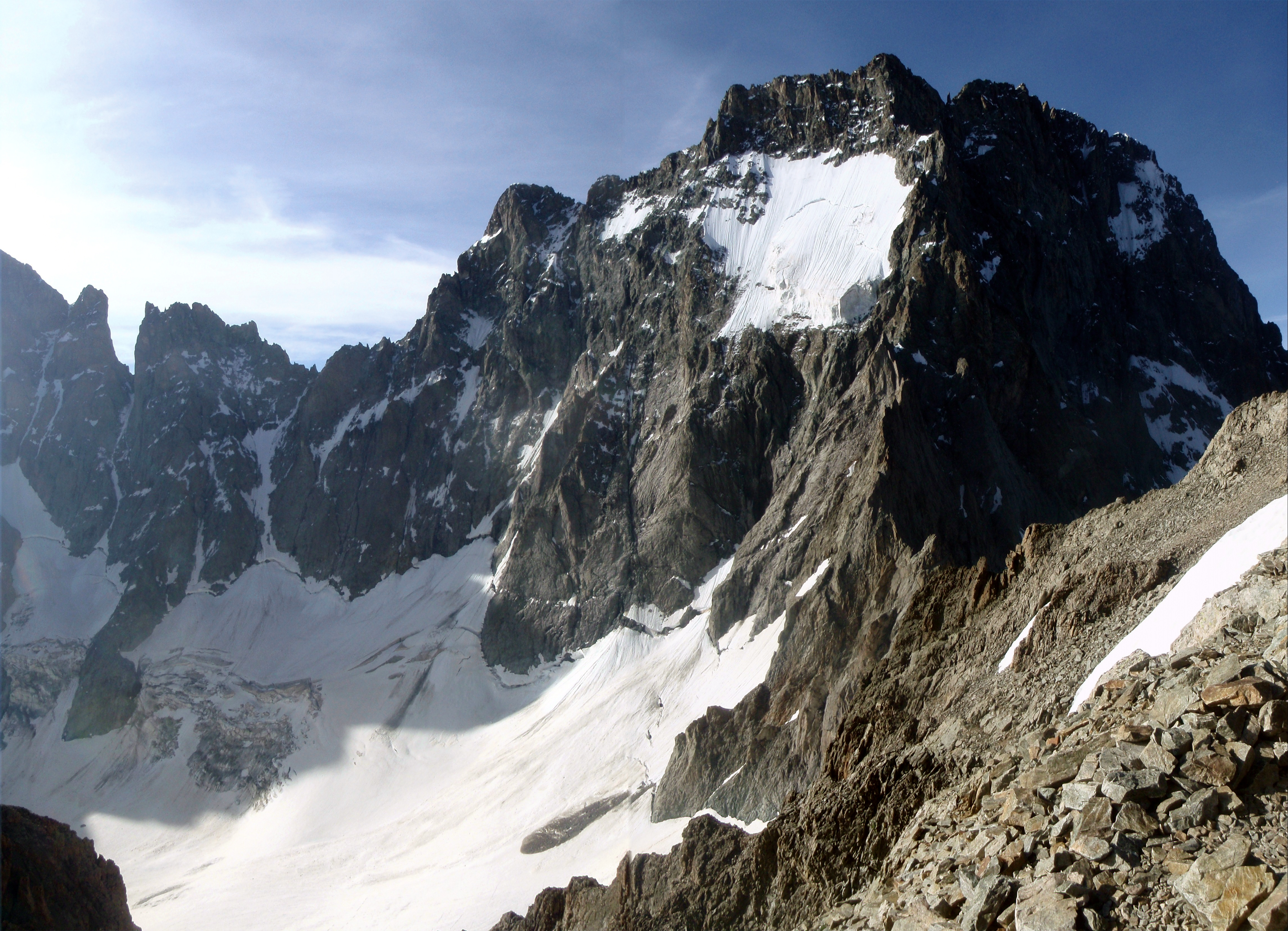
- North face of the Ailefroide above the southern branch of the Glacier Noir, seen from the Col de la Temple (3322m)

Highest point
- Elevation: 3,954 m (12,972 ft)
- Prominence: 762 m (2,500 ft)
- Isolation: 4.11 km (2.55 mi)
- Listing: Alpine mountains above 3000 m
- Coordinates: 44°53′06″N 6°21′22″E

Geography
- Location within France
- Location: Hautes-Alpes/Isère, France
- Parent range: Dauphiné Alps

Climbing
- First ascent: 7 July 1870 by W. A. B. Coolidge, Christian Almer and Ulrich Almer
- Easiest route: snow/rock climb

The Ailefroide (3,954 m) is a mountain in the Massif des Écrins in the French Alps, and is the third highest peak in the Dauphiné Alps after the Barre des Écrins and La Meije. It lies at the south-western end of the Mont Pelvoux–Pic Sans Nom–Ailefroide ridge.

There are three main summits on the mountain:

- L'Ailefroide Occidentale (3,954 m): first ascent by W. A. B. Coolidge with guides Christian Almer and Ulrich Almer on 7 July 1870
- L'Ailefroide Centrale (3,928 m): first ascent by Auguste Reynier, Pierre Gaspard (father), Christophe Clot and Joseph Turc on 8 August 1889
- L'Ailefroide Orientale (3,848 m): first ascent by J. Nérot, Emile Pic and Giraud-Lézin on 25 August 1880

== See also ==
- List of mountains of the Alps above 3000 m
