= Brèche de la Meije =

- Location within Alps
- Elevation: 3,357 m (11,014 ft)
- Traversed by: Glacier

Third Approach
- Location: Savoie, France
- Range: Dauphiné Alps
- Coordinates: 45°13′40″N 06°12′13.5″E

The Brèche de la Meije (el. 3357 m) is a high mountain pass in the Dauphiné Alps in Savoie in southeastern France.

It is in the massif of Écrins in the Écrins National Park.

It is an easy climb and an excellent starting course. The climb from the bivouac to the foot of the glacier of Etançons takes 2½ hour. From the foot of the glacier to the summit takes 1¼ hours.

It was first crossed by Edward Whymper with Michel Croz, A. W. Moore, Horace Walker, and Christian Almer in 1864, going from La Grave to La Bérarde.

== See also ==
- List of mountain passes
