= Têtes des Vautisse =

Coordinates: 44.7007°N 6.4851°E

Têtes des Vautisse is a mountain in the French Alps. Located in the Massif des Écrins, the mountain is 3,156 metres (10,354 ft) tall.
