= Le Taillefer =

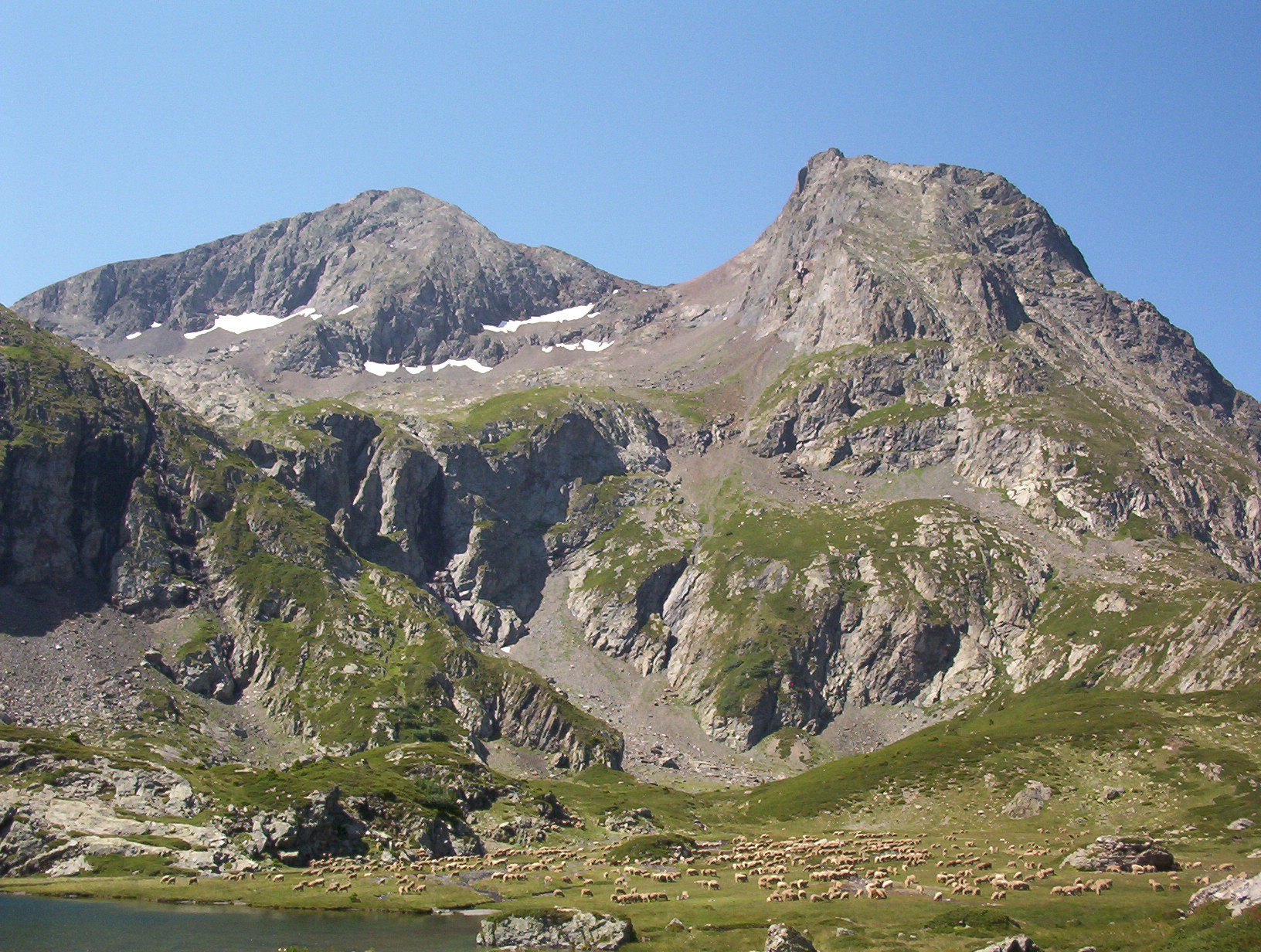

Highest point
- Elevation: 2,857 m (9,373 ft)
- Prominence: 1,490 m (4,890 ft)
- Coordinates: 45°02′22″N 5°55′27″E

Geography
- Location within Alps
- Location: Rhône-Alpes, France
- Parent range: Dauphiné Alps

Climbing
- First ascent: 1848 by Loupot

Le Taillefer is a mountain in the Dauphiné Alps, culminating at a height of 2,857 m (9,373 ft). It is located south-east of Grenoble, and is the highest mountain in the Taillefer Massif.
