= Roche de la Muzelle =

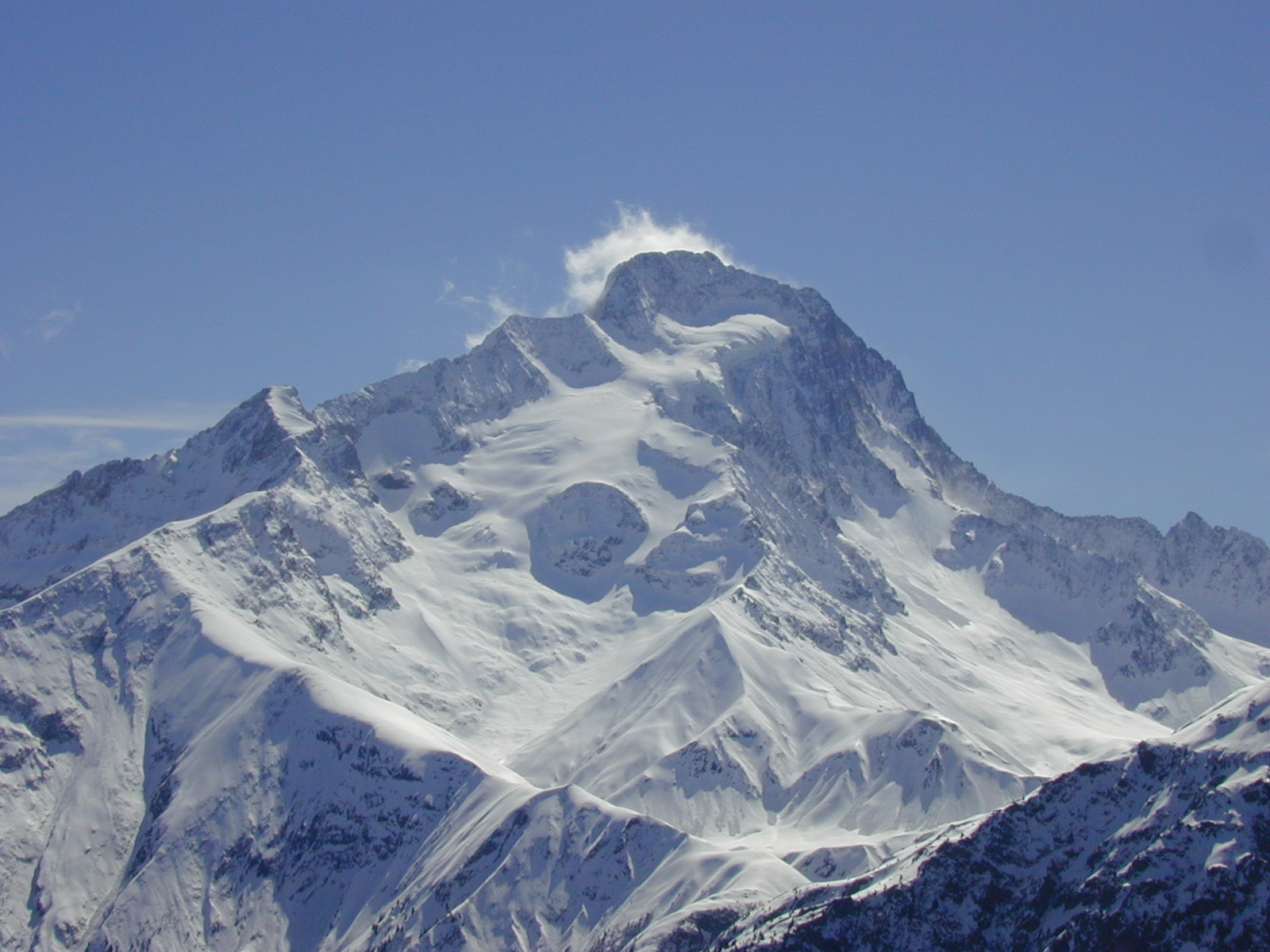
- North side of the mountain

Highest point
- Elevation: 3,465 m (11,368 ft)
- Prominence: 529 m (1,736 ft)
- Listing: Alpine mountains above 3000 m
- Coordinates: 44°55′52″N 6°06′19″E

Geography
- Location within France
- Location: Isère, France
- Parent range: Dauphine Alps

Climbing
- First ascent: 2 July 1875 by W. A. B. Coolidge with Ulrich and Christian Almer
- Easiest route: PD glacier/rock

The Roche de la Muzelle (3,465m) is the most western peak of the Massif des Ecrins. Located near Les Deux Alpes, the mountain - with its beautiful pyramid - dominates the resort from the south.

== Guides ==
- Le massif des ecrins - les 100 plus belles courses et randonnées, by Gaston Rebuffat
