= Le Piolit =

Mountain in the Alps

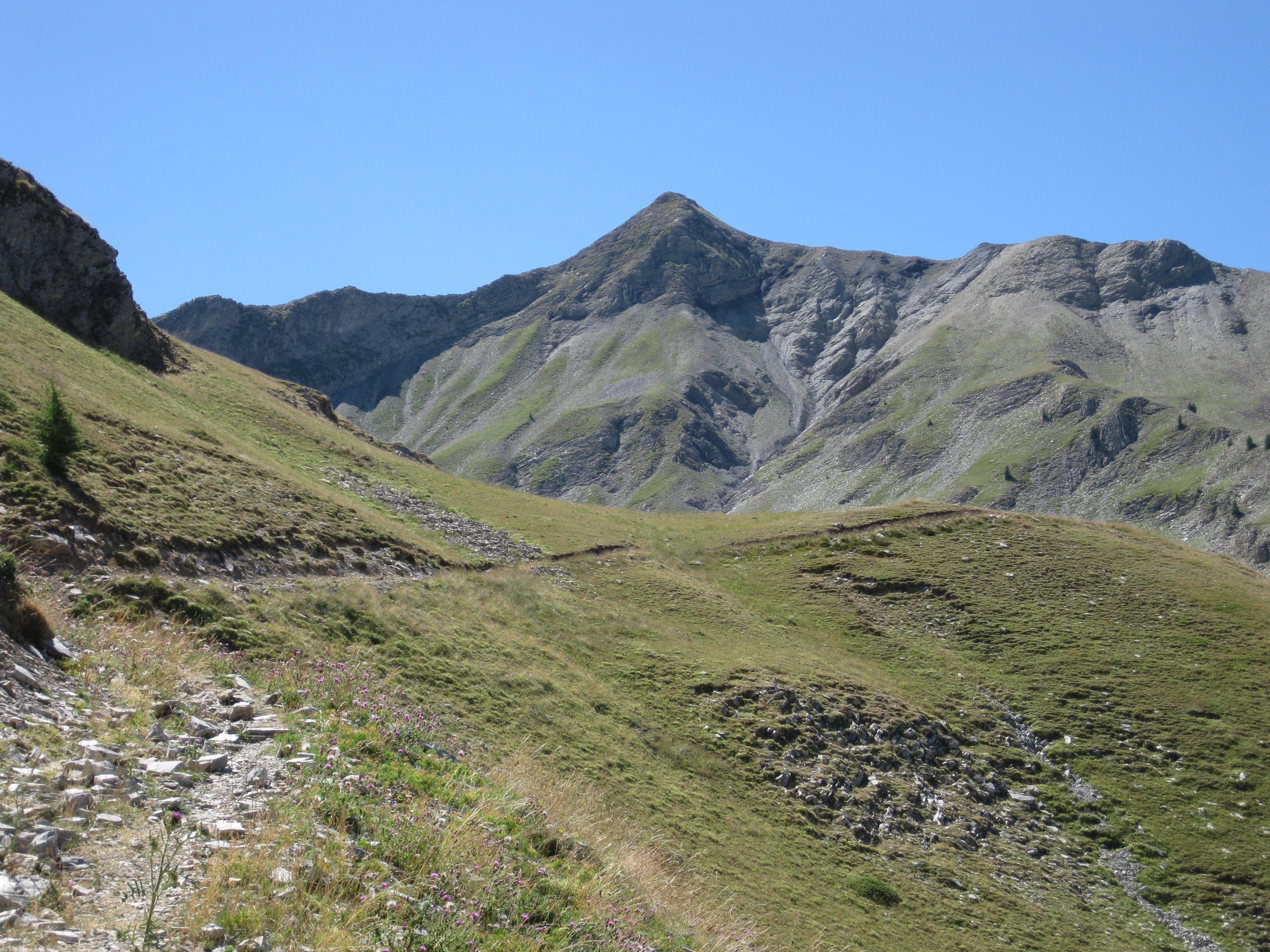
- Le Piolit, south view from Cabane de la Selle.

Highest point
- Elevation: 2,464 m (8,084 ft)
- Coordinates: 44°36′12″N 6°16′1″E

Geography
- Location within France
- Location: Hautes-Alpes, France

Le Piolit is a 2,464-metre mountain in the Dauphiné Alps close to the cities of Gap and Ancelle in the département of Hautes-Alpes in France.
