= Dauphiné Alps =

Group of mountain ranges in France

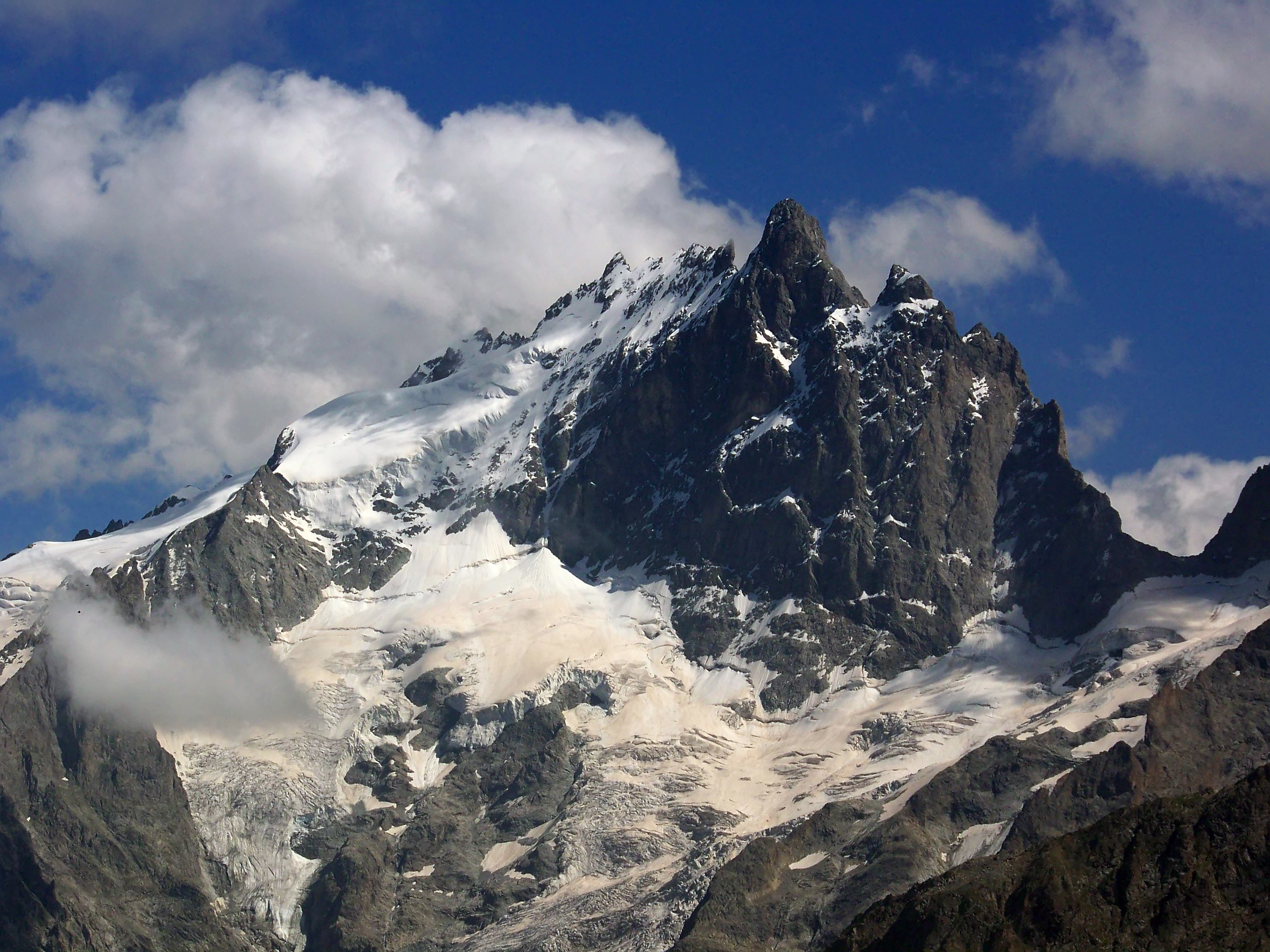
- La Meije seen from the Emparis plateau

Highest point
- Peak: Barre des Écrins
- Elevation: 4,102 m (13,458 ft)
- Coordinates: 44°55′23″N 6°21′36″E

Naming
- Native name: Alpes du Dauphiné (French)

Geography
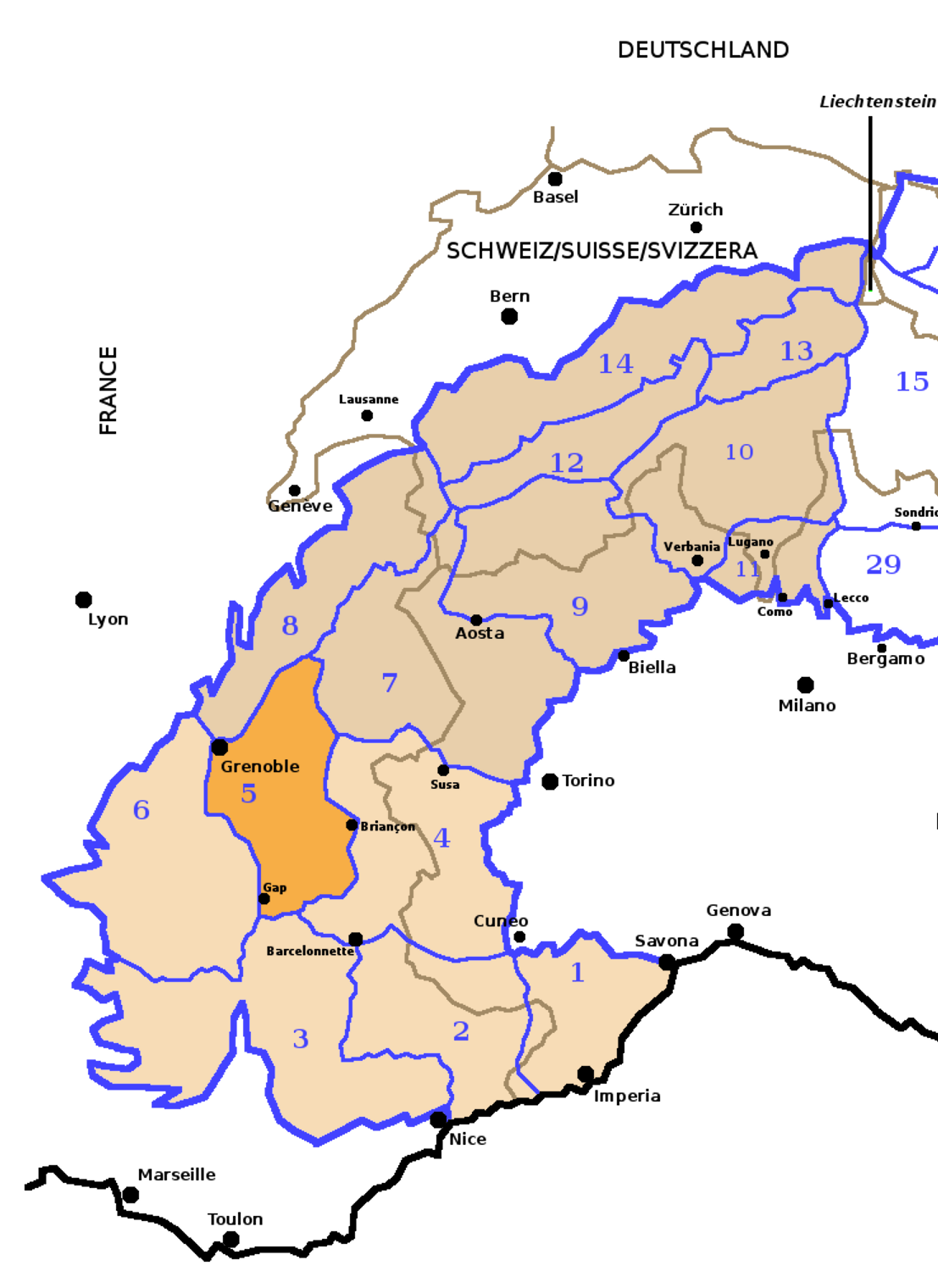
- Dauphiné Alps (section nr.5) within Western Alps
- Country: France
- Regions: Rhône-Alpes; Provence-Alpes-Côte d'Azur
- Rivers: Drac; Durance; Isère; Arc
- Parent range: Alps
- Borders on: Cottian Alps; Graian Alps; Savoy Prealps; Dauphiné Prealps; Provence Alps and Prealps

Geology
- Orogeny: Alpine orogeny

The Dauphiné Alps (Alpes du Dauphiné) are a group of mountain ranges in southeastern France, west of the main chain of the Alps. Mountain ranges within the Dauphiné Alps include the Massif des Écrins in Écrins National Park, Belledonne, Le Taillefer range and the mountains of Matheysine.

== Etymology ==
The Dauphiné (pronounced [dofine]) is a former French province whose area roughly corresponded to that of the present departments of Isère, Drôme, and Hautes-Alpes.

== Geography ==
They are separated from the Cottian Alps in the east by the Col du Galibier and the upper Durance valley; from the western Graian Alps (Vanoise Massif) in the north-east by the river Arc; from the lower ranges Vercors Plateau and Chartreuse Mountains in the west by the rivers Drac and Isère. Many peaks rise to more than 10,000 feet (3,000 m), with Barre des Écrins (4,102 m) the highest.

Administratively the French part of the range belongs to the French departments of Isère, Hautes-Alpes and Savoie.

The whole range is drained by the Rhône through its tributaries.

It has been proposed that the height of mountains in the Dauphiné Alps is limited by the erosion caused by small glaciers, causing a topographic effect called the glacial buzzsaw.

== Peaks ==
The chief peaks of the Dauphiné Alps are:

| Peak | Elevation | |
| Peak | m | ft |
|---|---|---|
| Barre des Écrins | 4,102 | 13,458 |
| Meije | 3,987 | 13,081 |
| Ailefroide | 3,954 | 12,972 |
| Mont Pelvoux | 3,946 | 12,946 |
| Pic Sans Nom | 3,913 | 12,838 |
| Pic Gaspard | 3,880 | 12,730 |
| Pic Coolidge | 3,756 | 12,323 |
| Grande Ruine | 3,754 | 12,316 |
| Le Râteau | 3,754 | 12,316 |
| Les Bans | 3,669 | 12,037 |
| Les Agneaux | 3,660 | 12,008 |
| Sommet des Rouies | 3,634 | 11,923 |
| Aiguille du Plat de la Selle | 3,596 | 11,798 |
| Olan | 3,564 | 11,693 |
| Pic Bonvoisin | 3,560 | 11,680 |
| Aiguilles d'Arves (highest point) | 3,514 | 11,529 |

| Peak | Elevation | |
| Peak | m | ft |
|---|---|---|
| Pic Bayle | 3,465 | 11,368 |
| Roche de la Muzelle | 3,459 | 11,348 |
| Sirac | 3,438 | 11,280 |
| Pic Felix Neff | 3,222 | 10,571 |
| Vieux Chaillol | 3,163 | 10,377 |
| Tete de Vautisse | 3,162 | 10,374 |
| Grand Pinier | 3,120 | 10,236 |
| Pic de Parieres | 3,050 | 10,007 |
| Mourre Froid | 2,996 | 9,829 |
| Grand Pic de Belledonne | 2,977 | 9,767 |
| Rocherblanc (Sept Laux) | 2,931 | 9,616 |
| Le Taillefer | 2,861 | 9,386 |
| Grande Tête de l'Obiou | 2,793 | 9,163 |
| Pic du Frêne | 2,810 | 9,219 |
| Grand Ferrand | 2,761 | 9,058 |
| Pic de Bure (Aurouse) | 2,712 | 8,898 |
| Le Piolit | 2,464 | 8,084 |

== Passes ==
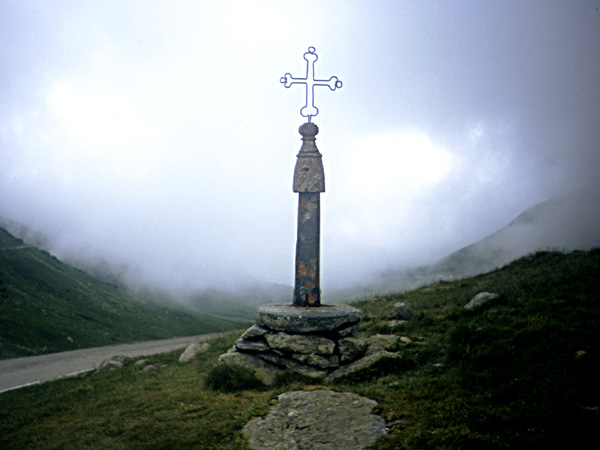
Col de la Croix de Fer

The chief passes of the Dauphiné Alps are:

| Name | Location | Type | Elevation | |
| Name | Location | Type | m | ft |
|---|---|---|---|---|
| Brèche de la Meije | La Bérarde to la Grave | snow | 3,300 | 10,827 |
| Brèche des Grandes Rousses | Allemont to Clavans | snow | 3,100 | 10,171 |
| Brèche de Valsenestre | Le Bourg-d'Oisans to Valsenestre | footpath | 2,634 | 8,642 |
| Col Bayard | La Mure to Gap | road | 1,246 | 4,088 |
| Col de la Casse Deserte | La Bérarde to La Grave | snow | 3,510 | 11,516 |
| Col de la Croix de Fer | Le Bourg-d'Oisans to Saint-Jean-d'Arves | road | 2,062 | 6,765 |
| Col de la Croix Haute | Grenoble to Serres and Gap | road, railroad | 1,167 | 3,829 |
| Col de la Lauze | Saint-Christophe-en-Oisans to La Grave | snow | 3,543 | 11,624 |
| Col de l'Alpe de Vénosc | Vénosc to Les Deux Alpes | bridle path | 1,660 | 5,446 |
| Col de la Muande | St Christophe to the Val Gaudemar | snow | 3,059 | 10,036 |
| Col de la Muzelle | St Christophe to Valsenestre | footpath | 2,500 | 8,202 |
| Col d'Arsine | La Grave to Le Monêtier-les-Bains | bridle path | 2,400 | 7,874 |
| Col de la Temple | La Bérarde to Vallouise | snow | 3,283 | 10,771 |
| Col de la Vaurze | Val Gaudemar to Valjouffrey | footpath | 2,600 | 8,530 |
| Col de l'Eychauda | Vallouise to Le Monêtier-les-Bains | bridle path | 2,429 | 7,969 |
| Col de l'Infernet | La Grave to Saint-Jean-d'Arves | footpath | 2,690 | 8,825 |
| Col de Martignare | La Grave to Saint-Jean-d'Arves | footpath | 2,600 | 8,530 |
| Col des Aiguilles d'Arves | Valloire to Saint-Jean-d'Arves | snow | 3,150 | 10,335 |
| Col des Avalanches | La Bérarde to Vallouise | snow | 3,511 | 11,519 |
| Col des Ecrins | La Bérarde to Vallouise | snow | 3,415 | 11,204 |
| Col des Prés Nouveaux | Le Freney to Saint-Jean-d'Arves | bridle path | 2,293 | 7,523 |
| Col des Quirlies | Saint-Jean-d'Arves to Clavans | snow | 2,950 | 9,678 |
| Col des Sept Laux | Allevard to Le Bourg-d'Oisans | bridle path | 2,184 | 7,165 |
| Col des Tourettes | Orcières to Châteauroux-les-Alpes | bridle path | 2,580 | 8,465 |
| Col de Val Estrete | Val Gaudemar to Champoléon | footpath | 2,620 | 8,596 |
| Col de Vallonpierre | Val Gaudemar to Champoléon | footpath | 2,620 | 8,596 |
| Col d'Orcières | Dormillouse to Orcières | bridle path | 2,700 | 8,858 |
| Col d'Ornon | Le Bourg-d'Oisans to La Mure | road | 1,360 | 4,462 |
| Col du Clot des Cavales | La Bérarde to La Grave | snow | 3,128 | 10,262 |
| Col du Galibier | Col du Lautaret to Saint-Michel-de-Maurienne | road | 2,658 | 8,720 |
| Col du Glacier Blanc | La Grave to Vallouise | snow | 3,308 | 10,853 |
| Col du Glandon | Bourg d'Oisans to La Chambre | road | 1,951 | 6,401 |
| Col du Goleon | La Grave to Valloire | footpath | 2,880 | 9,449 |
| Col du Lautaret | Briançon to Bourg d'Oisans | road | 2,075 | 6,808 |
| Col du Loup du Valgaudemar | Vallouise to the Val Gaudemar | snow | 3,112 | 10,210 |
| Col du Says | La Bérarde to the Val Gaudemar | snow | 3,136 | 10,289 |
| Col du Sele | La Bérarde to Vallouise | snow | 3,302 | 10,833 |
| Col du Sellar | Vallouise to the Val Gaudemar | snow | 3,067 | 10,062 |
| Col Emile Pic | La Grave to Vallouise | snow | 3,502 | 11,490 |
| Col Lombard | La Grave to Saint-Jean-d'Arves | snow | 3,100 | 10,171 |
| Pas de la Cavale | Vallouise to Champoléon | dirt road | 2,740 | 8,990 |

== Maps ==
- French official cartography (Institut Géographique National – IGN); on-line version: www.geoportail.fr
