= Grande Ruine =

Mountain in Hautes-Alpes, France

La Grande Ruine
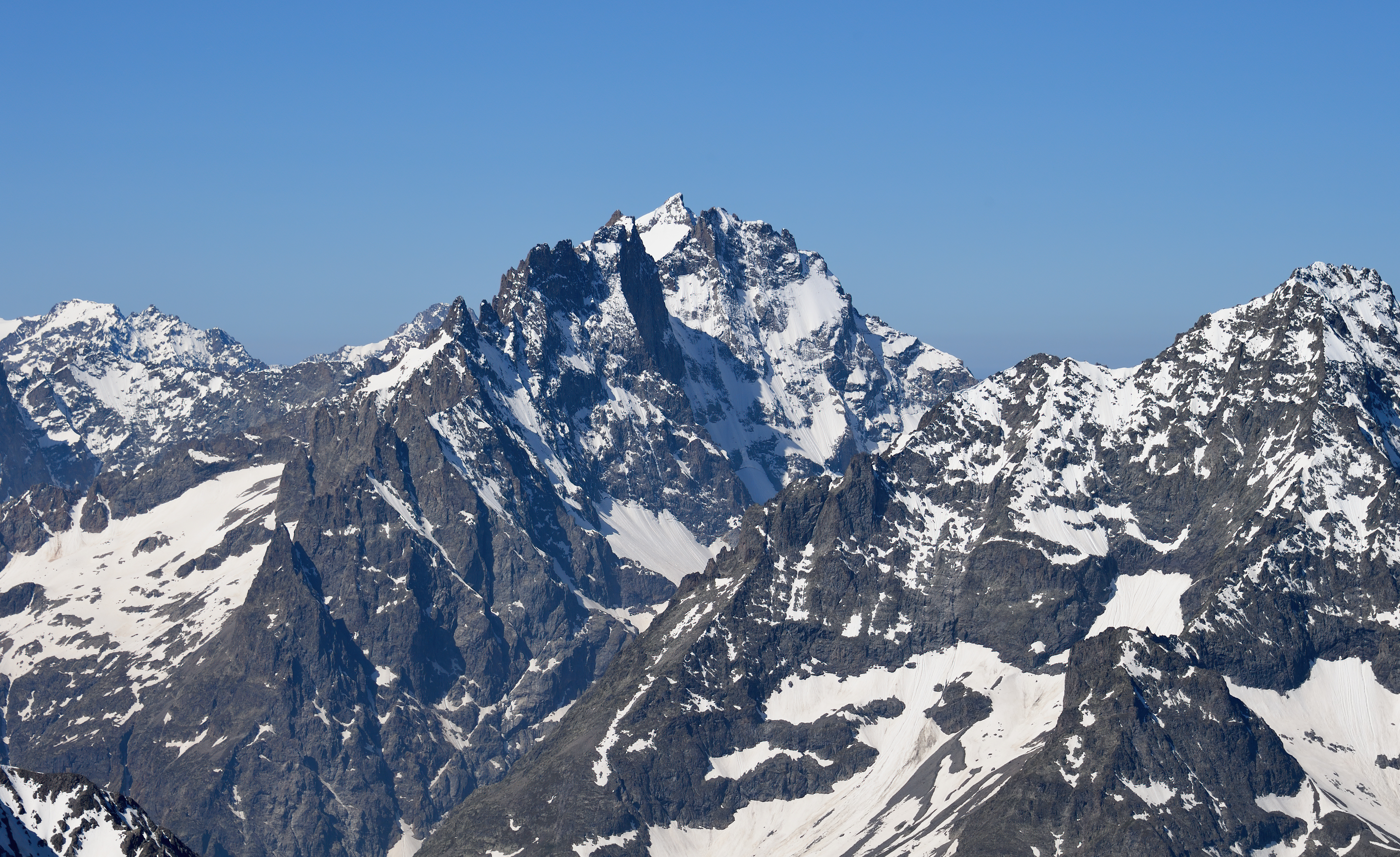
- Aerial view of the Grande Ruine

Highest point
- Elevation: 3,765 m (12,352 ft)
- Prominence: 496 m (1,627 ft)
- Isolation: 4.41 km (2.74 mi)
- Listing: Alpine mountains above 3000 m
- Coordinates: 44°58′02″N 6°19′47″E

Geography
- Location within Alps
- Location: Hautes-Alpes, France
- Parent range: Massif des Écrins

La Grande Ruine (3,765 m) is a mountain in Hautes-Alpes, France. It belongs to the Massif des Écrins in the Dauphiné Alps and is located in the heart of the wilderness of the Écrins National Park roughly halfway between its illustrious neighbours Barre des Écrins and Meije. The mountain has two different summits, the Pointe Brevoort at 3,765 m to the south and Pic Maître at 3,726 m to the north.

== Climbing ==
The normal route to the summit starts from the tiny village of Villar-d'Arêne near the Col du Lautaret. Despite its height and steepness the mountain is relatively easy to climb. The reward from the top is a great view across the Dauphiné Alps, which includes the mighty north face of the Barre des Écrins.
