= Pointe de l'Aiglière =

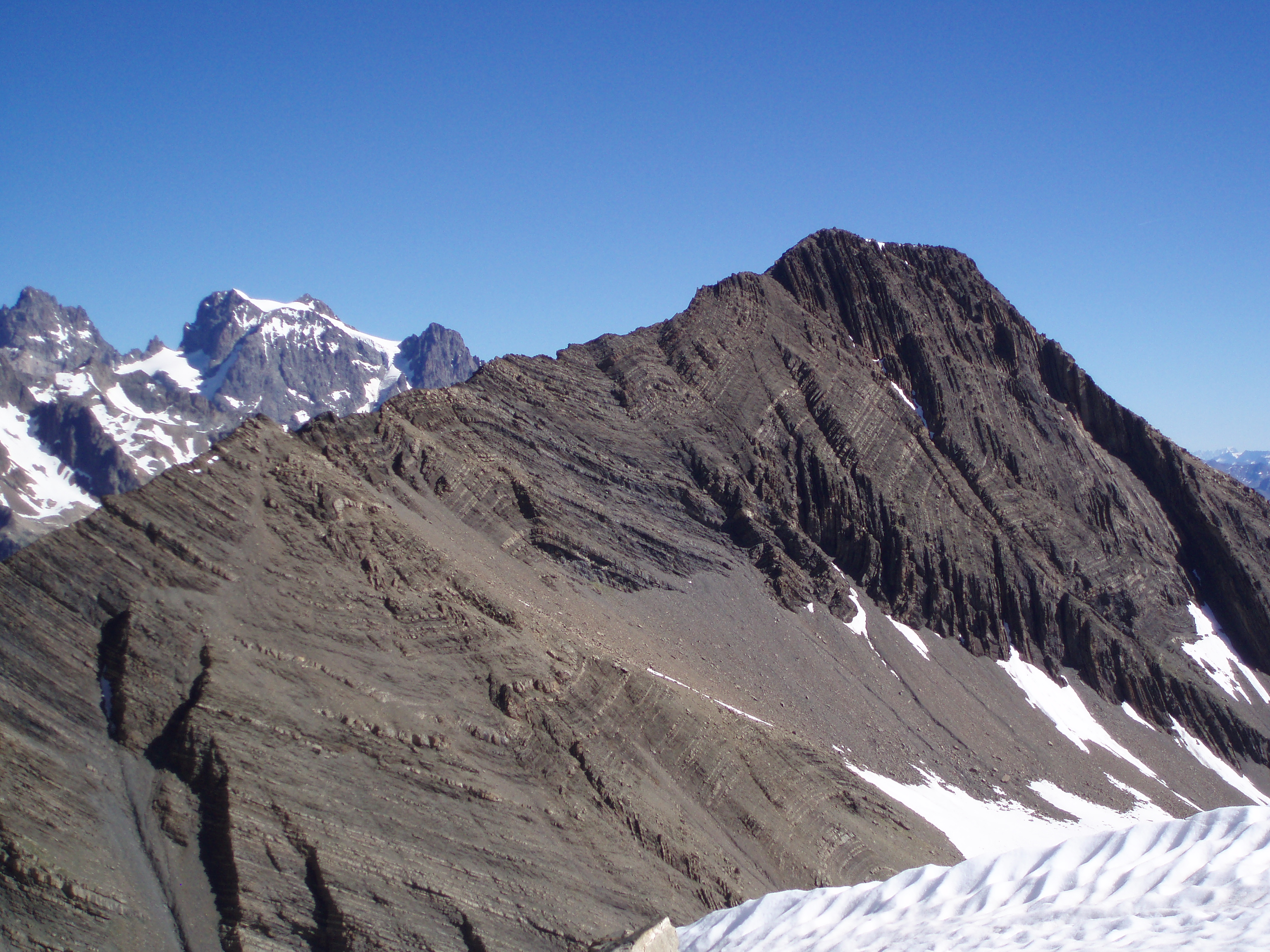

Highest point
- Elevation: 3,307 m (10,850 ft)
- Prominence: 557 m (1,827 ft)
- Listing: Alpine mountains above 3000 m
- Coordinates: 44°52′40″N 6°13′14″E

Geography
- Location within France
- Location: Hautes-Alpes, France
- Parent range: Massif des Écrins

Pointe de l'Aiglière is a mountain in the French Alps. Located in the Massif des Écrins, the mountain is 3,307 m tall.
