= Pic des Souffles =

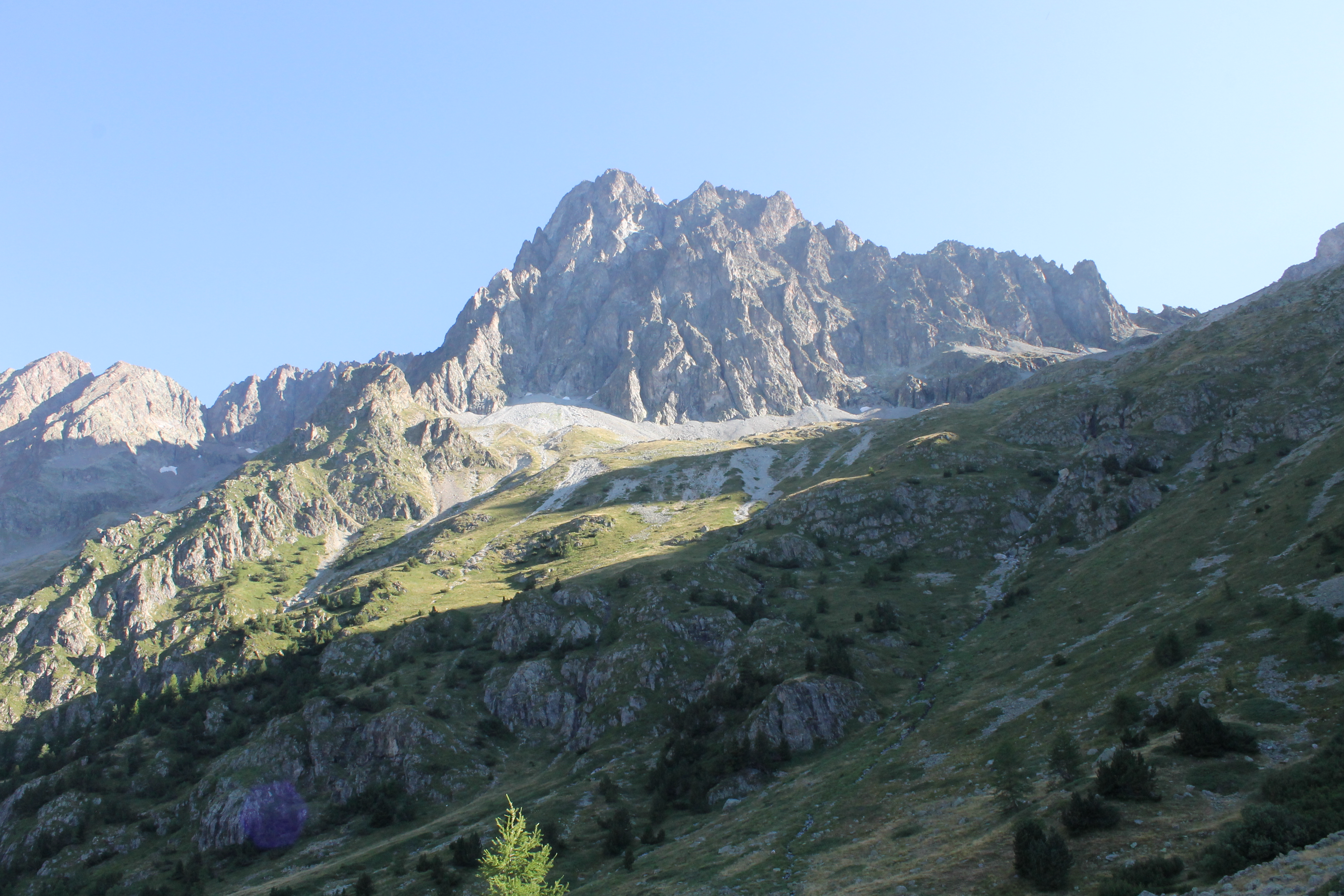
- Pic des Souffles

Highest point
- Elevation: 3,099 m (10,167 ft)
- Prominence: 437 m (1,434 ft)
- Listing: Alpine mountains above 3000 m
- Coordinates: 44°51′17″N 6°10′51″E

Geography
- Location within Alps
- Location: Hautes-Alpes, France
- Parent range: Massif des Écrins

Pic des Souffles is a mountain in the French Alps. Located in the Massif des Écrins, the mountain is 3,099 m tall.
