= Aiguille des Arias =

Mountain of the French Alps in Isère

Coordinates: 44°53′40″N 6°10′18″E

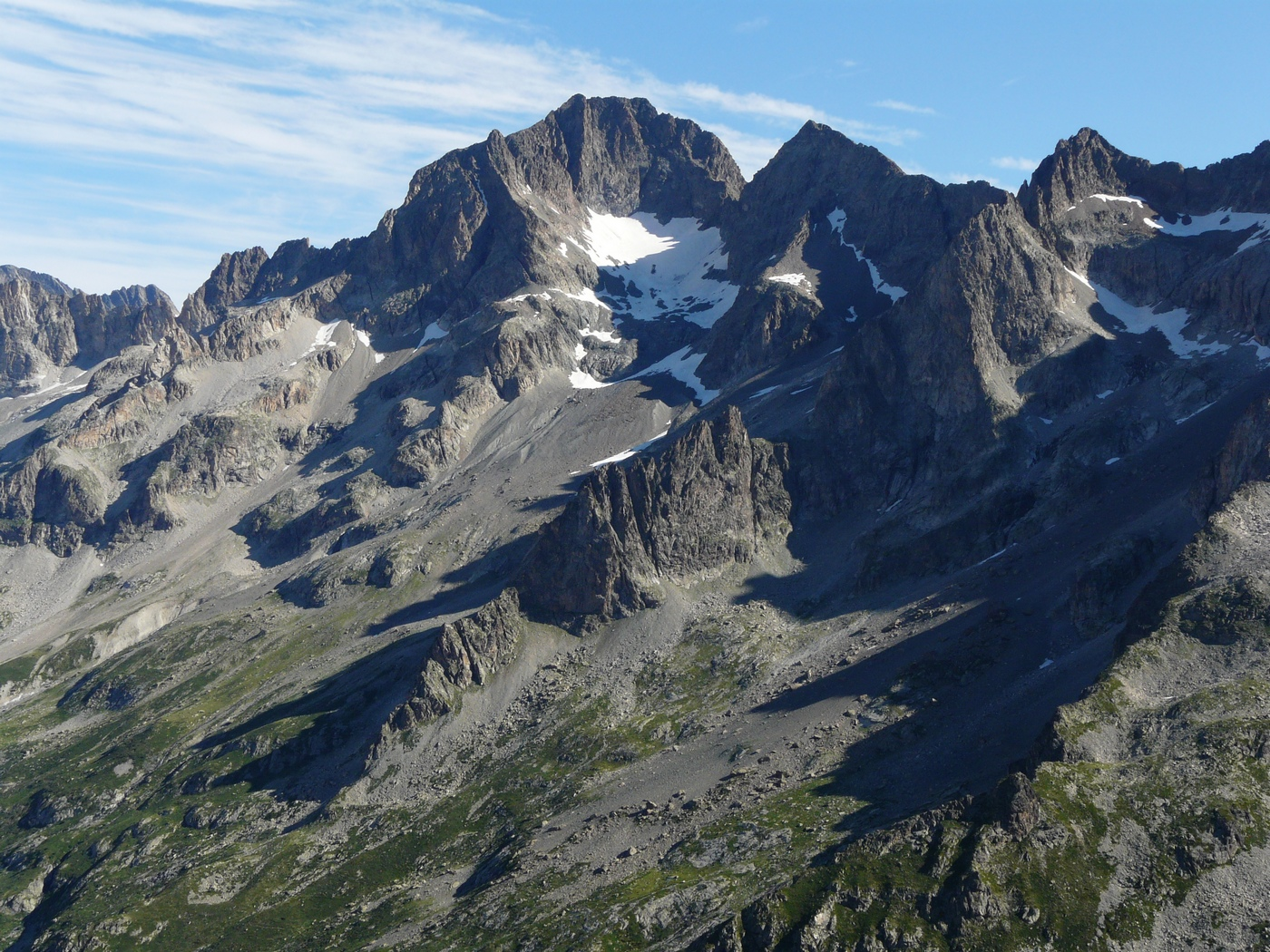
- Aiguille des Arias

Highest point
- Elevation: 3,402 m (11,161 ft)
- Prominence: 433 m (1,421 ft)
- Listing: Alpine mountains above 3000 m

Geography
- Location within Alps
- Location: Isère, France
- Parent range: Massif des Écrins

Aiguille des Arias is a mountain of the French Alps in Isère. Located in the Massif des Écrins, the mountain is 3,403 m tall.

The mirror of Fétoules is a lake that has reflection of Tête de Lauranoure (3323 m) to right Le Bec du Canard (3269 m) and the l'Aiguille des Arias (3403 m) in the center.
