= Le Rochail =

Mountain in the French Alps

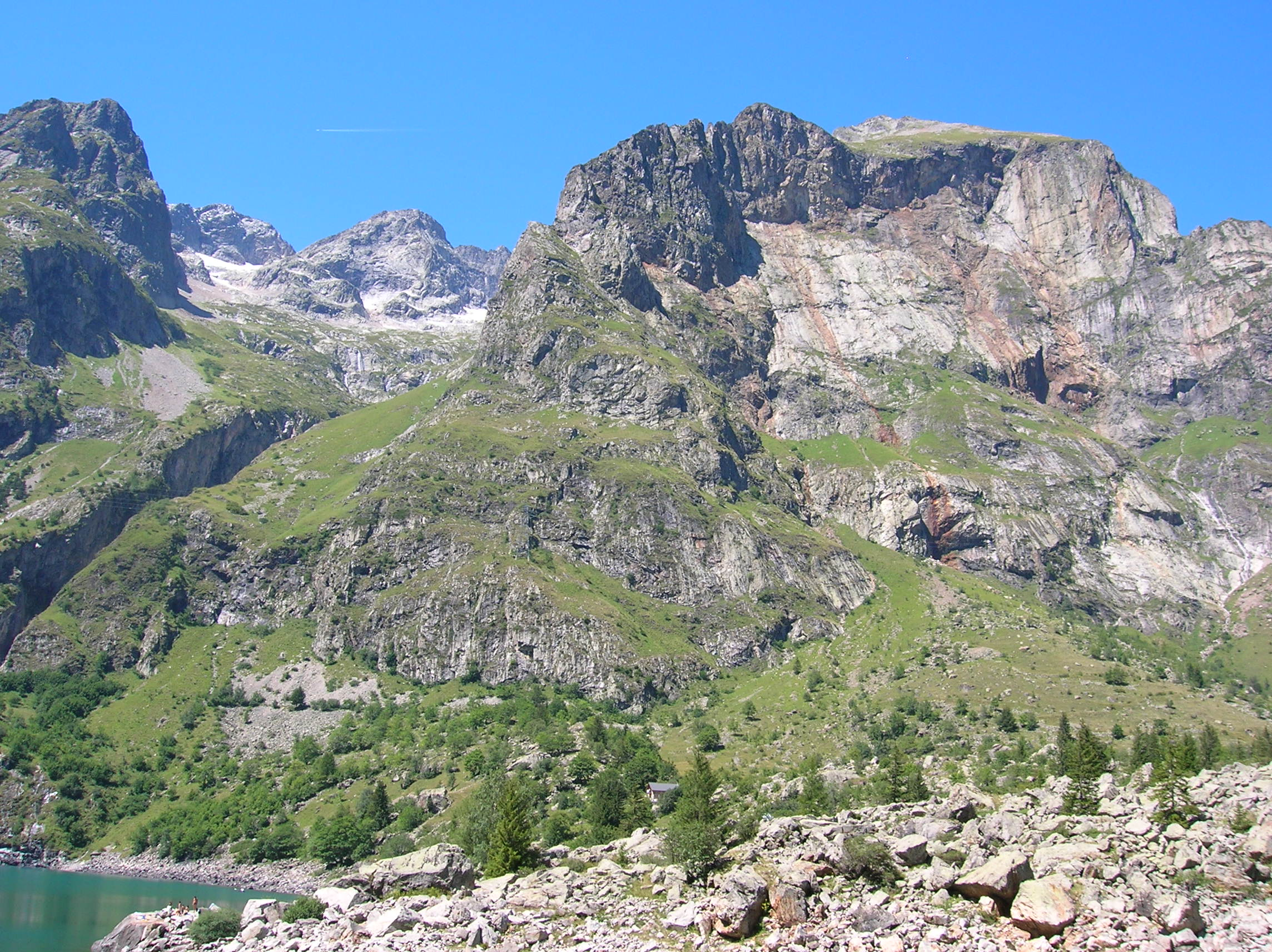
- Le Rochail (left) as seen from Lake Lauvitel

Highest point
- Elevation: 3,023 m (9,918 ft)
- Listing: Alpine mountains above 3000 m
- Coordinates: 44°58′48″N 6°01′52″E

Geography
- Location within France
- Location: Isère, France
- Parent range: Massif des Écrins

Le Rochail is a mountain in the French Alps. Located in the Massif des Écrins, the mountain has a summit elevation of 3,023 metres (9,918 ft). The mountain is situated within the Écrins National Park, one of Europe's largest high-altitude reserves.
