= Four-thousander =

Mountain summit at least 4,000 metres above sea level

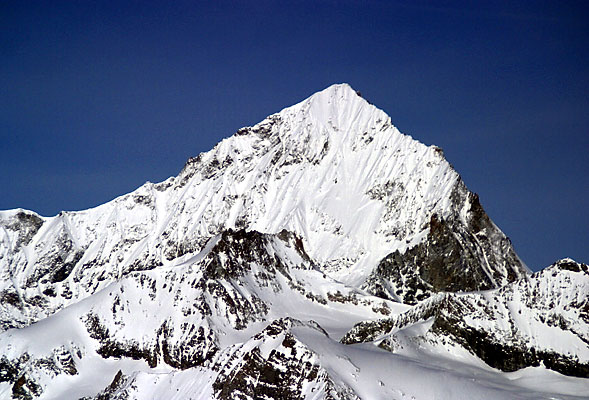
Dent Blanche (4,357 m)

A four-thousander is a mountain summit that is at least 4,000 metres above sea level. The term is popular among European mountaineers and climbers because the highest peaks in Europe fall into this category, and the summits of four-thousanders are popular in Europe as climbing goals. Although climbing these peaks does not require an expedition to be mounted (unlike the highest peaks in other continents), knowledge and experience of high altitude climbing is a pre-requisite for attempting these peaks.

There is no agreement over where the boundary is between Europe and Asia which is why there is a dispute over which continent the over 5,000 metres high Caucasus range is in. All other European four-thousanders are found in the Alps. The highest four-thousander is Mont Blanc at 4,810 m (15,780 ft), the lowest, at exactly 4,000 metres is the eastern summit of Les Droites.

The exact number of Alpine four-thousanders is unclear, because there are no commonly agreed criteria for mountains, summits and subpeaks. Officially, the International Mountaineering and Climbing Federation, UIAA, has declared 82 peaks as four-thousanders and 46 as four-thousander subpeaks, which are spread across three countries. In all 55 peaks lie entirely within one country, over 27 straddle a border but none is located at a tripoint. By the UIAA's definition, Switzerland has 48 four-thousanders, Italy has 35 and France 26.

The four-thousanders are found mainly in the Western Alps, in the ranges of the Bernese Alps (9), Dauphiné Alps (2) Graian Alps (29) and Pennine Alps (41). The only four-thousander in the Eastern Alps is Piz Bernina (4,049 m) in the Bernina Group.

== See also ==
- List of Alpine four-thousanders
- Two-thousander
- Three-thousander
- Eight-thousander
- Fourteener
