= Le Râteau =

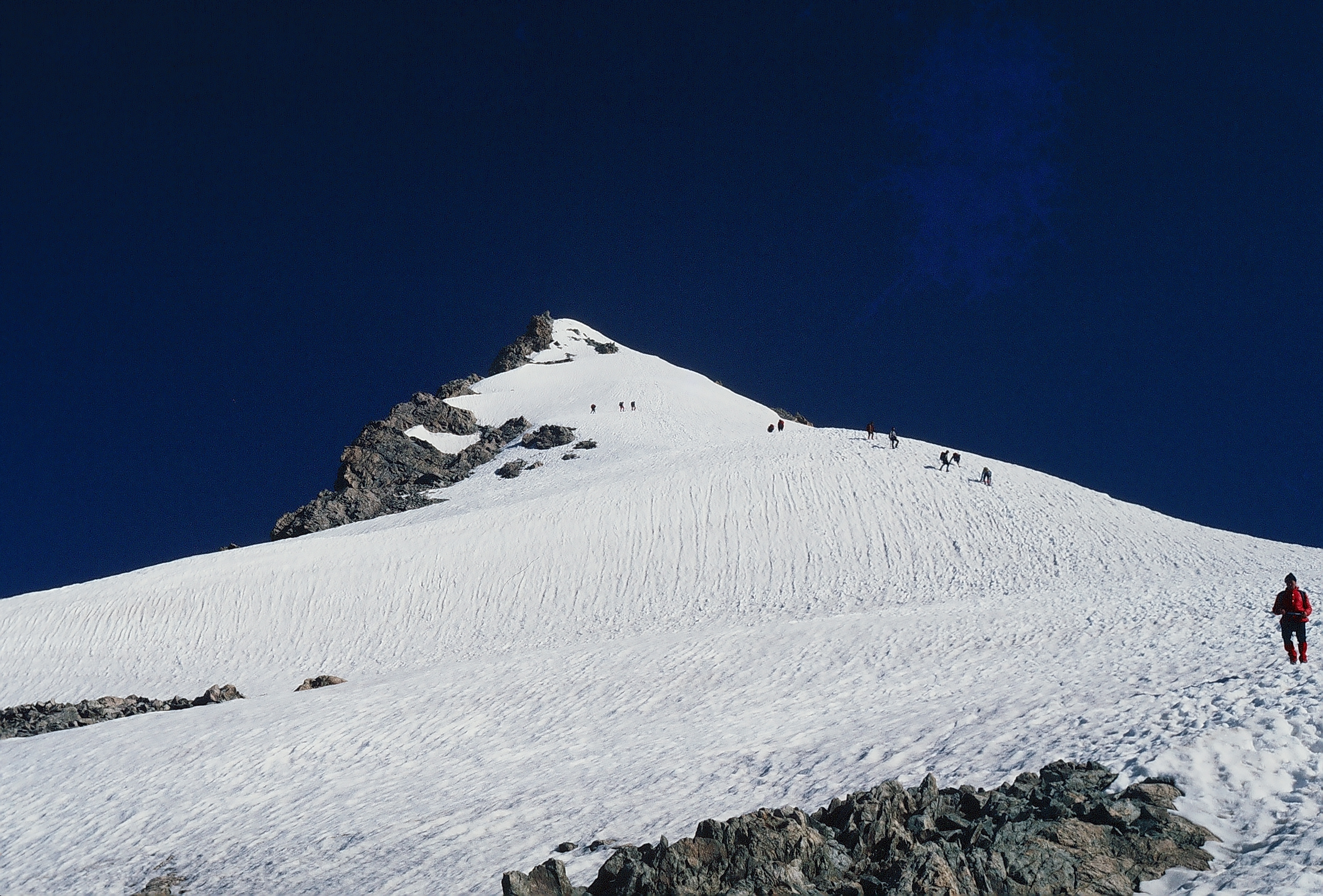
- The southern face of Le Râteau

Highest point
- Elevation: 3,809 m (12,497 ft)
- Prominence: 453.7 m (1,489 ft)
- Listing: Alpine mountains above 3000 m
- Coordinates: 45°0′2″N 6°17′1.1″E

Naming
- English translation: The Rake
- Language of name: French

Geography
- Location within France
- Location: Hautes-Alpes, France
- Parent range: Massif des Écrins, French Alps

Le Râteau is a mountain in the French Alps. Located in the Massif des Écrins, the mountain is 3,809 metres (12,497 ft) tall.

The mountain overlooks the valley of the Romanche river and the village of La Grave to the north. The summit is very close to Meije, which is separated by a ridge.

Le Râteau has the appearance of a rake or a comb with several teeth; the English translation of le râteau is "the rake". The mountain has two distinct peaks at its ends.

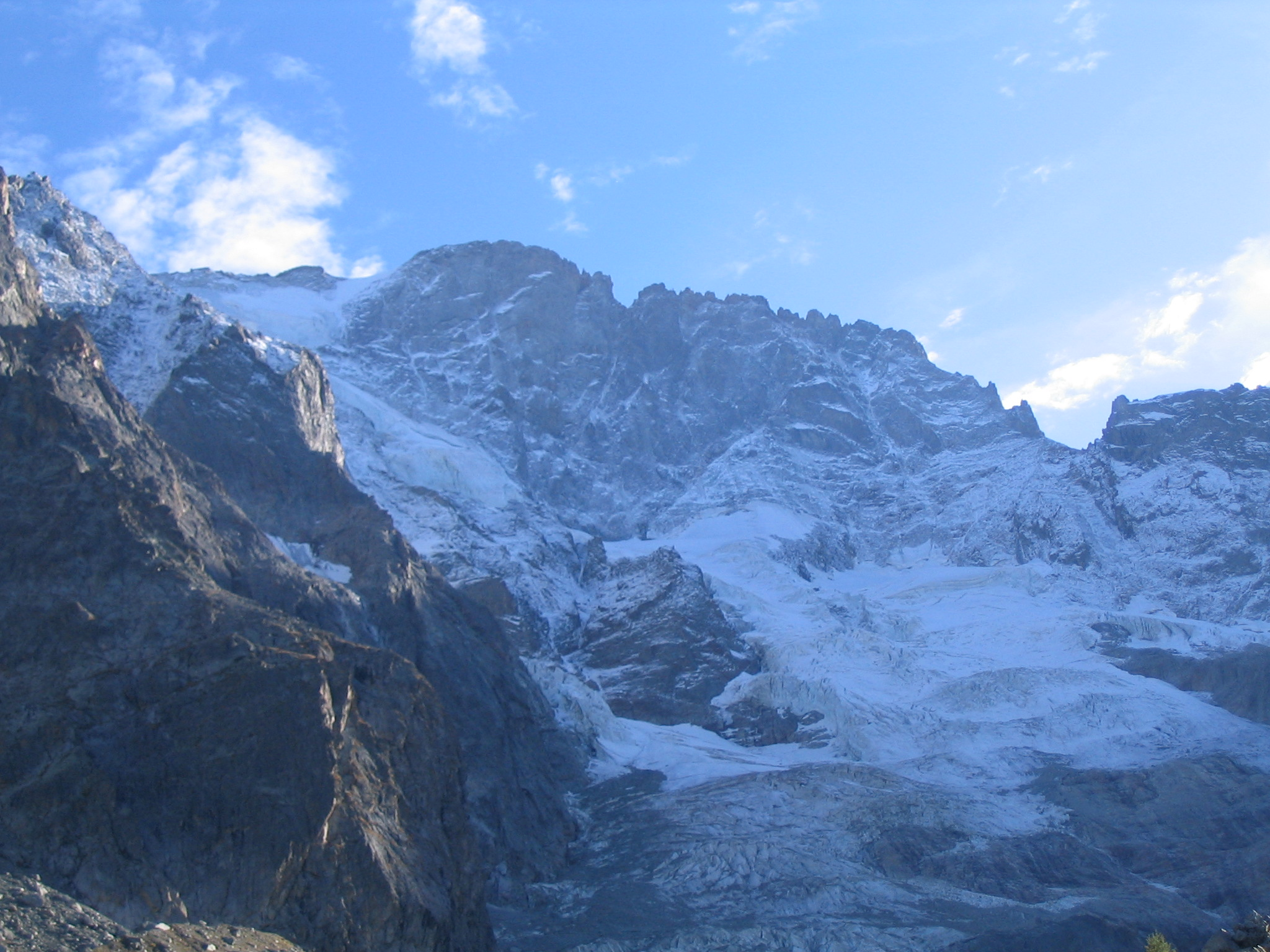
North face of le Râteau (September 2007)
