= Les Agneaux =

Mountain in France

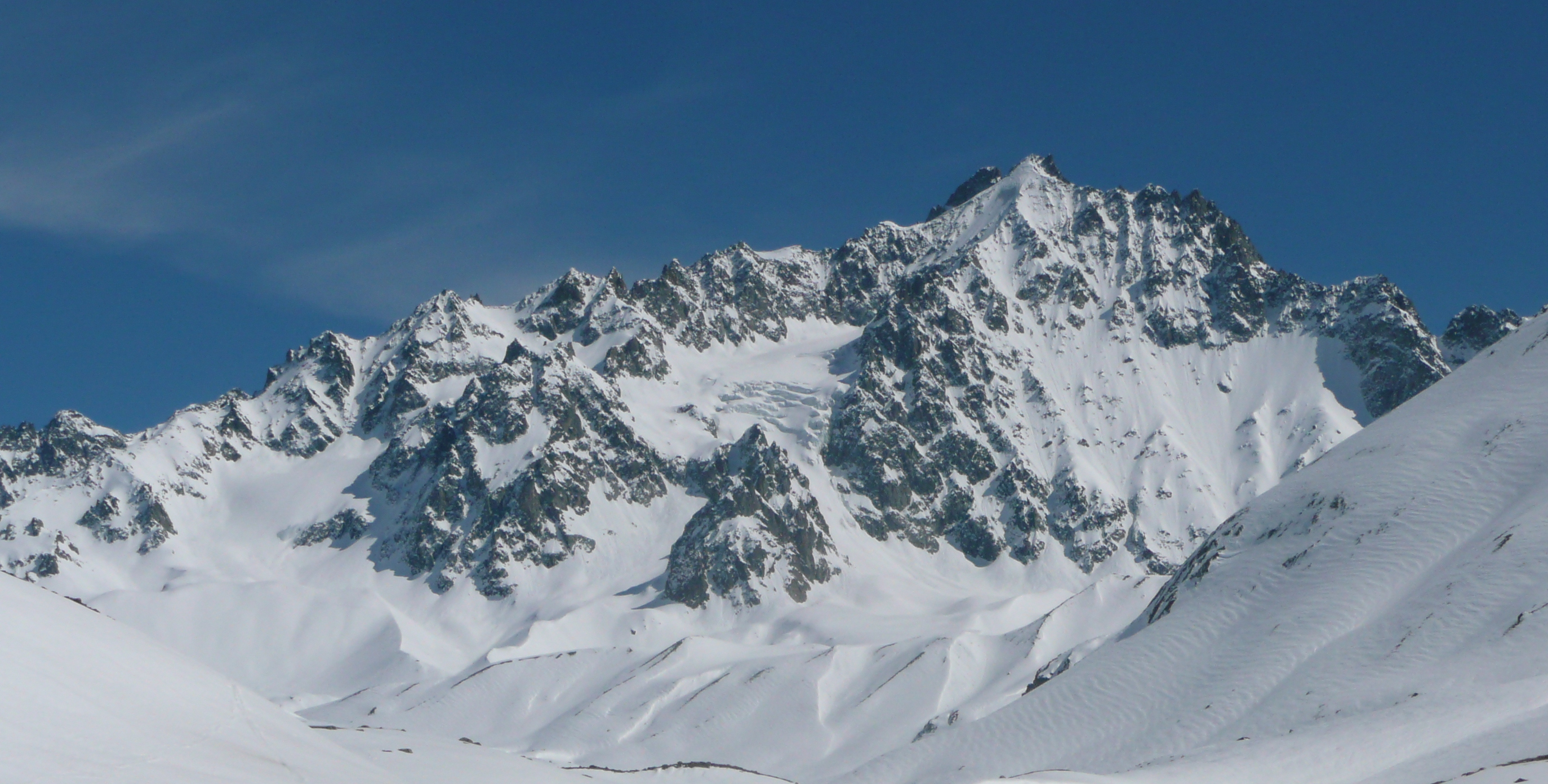
- The northwest face

Highest point
- Elevation: 3,664 m (12,021 ft)
- Listing: Alpine mountains above 3000 m
- Coordinates: 44°57′01″N 6°25′47″E

Geography
- Location within France
- Location: Hautes-Alpes, France
- Parent range: Massif des Écrins

Les Agneaux (French: [le.z‿a.ɲo]) is a mountain of the Massif des Écrins in Hautes-Alpes, France. Standing at 3,664 m (12,021 ft) in elevation, It is located in the commune of Pelvoux.

The tallest peak on the eastern side of the Écrins massif, the mountain has three different summits; the Agneau Blanc at 3,631 m, the northwest summit at 3,646 m, and the highest summit Agneau Noir. Two main ridges cross the mountain from north to south and from east to west.

Climbs usually start from the south and the view from the top takes in all the main Écrins summits.
