= Mont Pelvoux =

Mountain in the French Alps

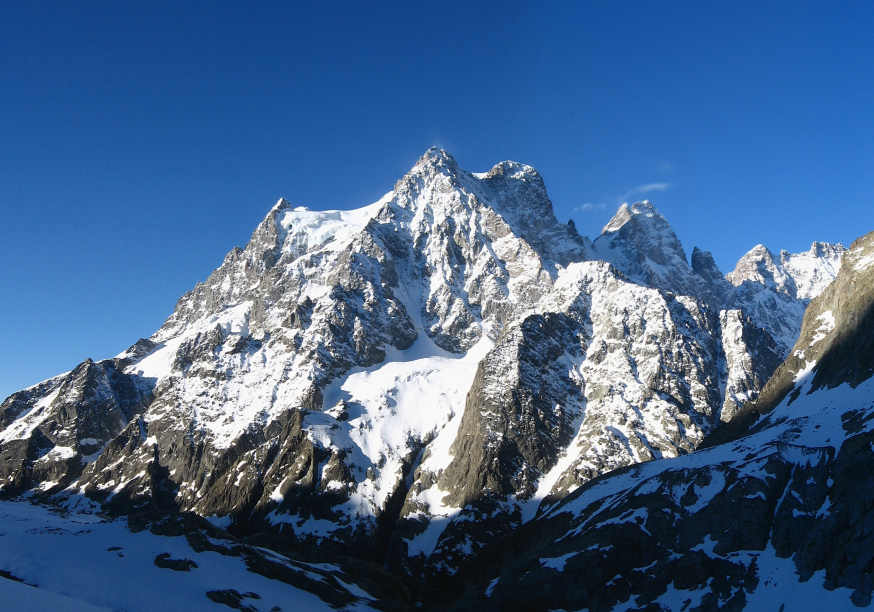
- North face of Mont Pelvoux

Highest point
- Elevation: 3,946 m (12,946 ft)
- Prominence: 448 m (1,470 ft)
- Listing: Alpine mountains above 3000 m
- Coordinates: 44°53′53″N 6°23′36″E

Geography
- Location within France
- Location: Hautes-Alpes, France
- Parent range: Dauphiné Alps

Climbing
- First ascent: Pointe Durand: 30 July 1828 by Captain Durand, A. Liotard and J. E. Matheoud; Highest point: 9 August 1848 by P. A. Barnéoud guiding Victor Puiseux

Mont Pelvoux (French: [mɔ̃ pɛlvu]) is a mountain in the Massif des Écrins in the French Alps. It stands 3,946 m (12,946 ft) in elevation.

For many years, Mont Pelvoux was believed to be the tallest mountain in the region, since the taller Barre des Écrins cannot be seen from the Durance valley.

The summit of the mountain is called Pointe Puiseux (French: [pwɛ̃t pɥizø]). There are three subpeaks:

- Pointe Durand (3,932 m (12,900 ft))
- Petit Pelvoux (3,753 m (12,313 ft))
- Trois Dents du Pelvoux (3,682 m (12,080 ft))

== Ascents ==
The first ascent of Mont Pelvoux was by Captain Durand and the two chamois hunters Alexis Liotard and Jacques-Etienne Matheoud on 30 July 1828. This party returned, with more people, to the summit in 1830. Both times they climbed the "Pointe Durand".

The highest point is named after the astronomer Victor Puiseux, who reached it first with his guide Pierre Antoine Barnéoud on 9 August 1848. Barnéoud had been the third guide in the 1830 re-ascent.

== See also ==
- List of mountains of the Alps above 3000 m
