= Massif des Écrins =

Mountain in France

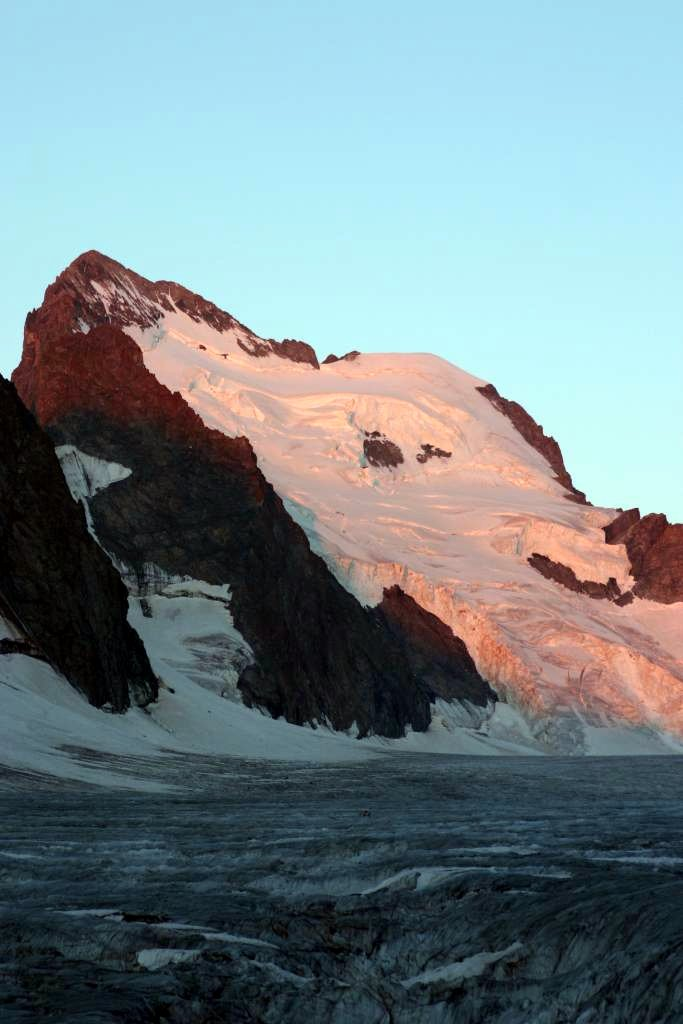
- The Barre des Écrins in early morning light, July 2006

Highest point
- Peak: Barre des Écrins
- Elevation: 4,102 m (13,458 ft)
- Coordinates: 44°55′23″N 6°21′36″E

Geography
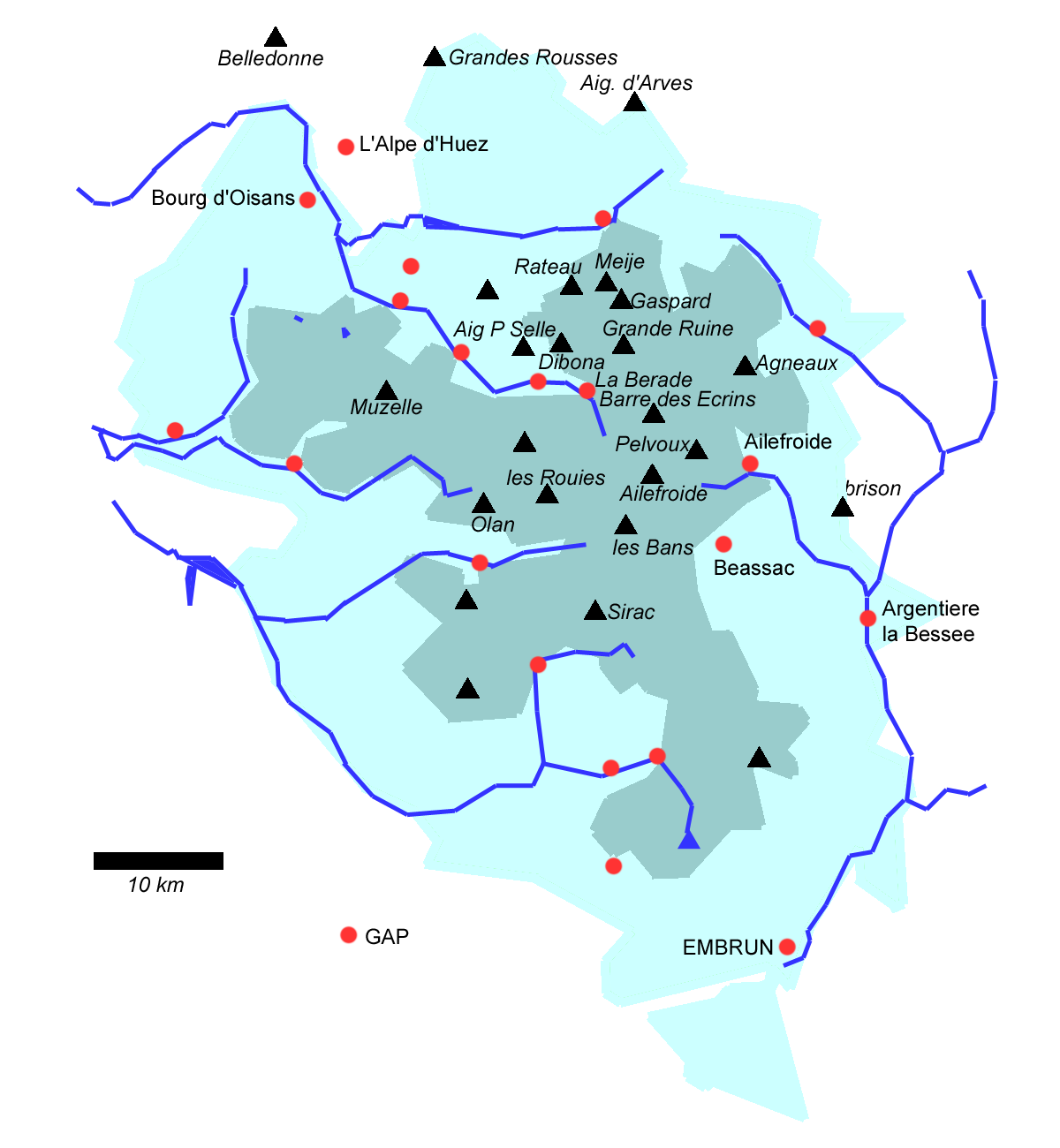
- Principal summits of the Écrins, together with the national park boundaries
- Country: France
- Parent range: Dauphiné Alps

Massif des Écrins (French: [ma.sif de.z‿e.kʁɛ̃]; Écrins Massif) is a massif in the French Alps. They form the core of Écrins National Park in Hautes-Alpes and Isère.

== Mountains ==
- Barre des Écrins, 4,102 m (13,458 ft)
- La Meije, 3,983 m (13,068 ft)
- Ailefroide, 3,954 m (12,972 ft)
- Mont Pelvoux, 3,946 m (12,946 ft)
- Pic Sans Nom, 3,913 m (12,838 ft)
- Pic Gaspard, 3,883 m (12,740 ft)
- Le Râteau, 3,809 m (12,497 ft)
- Pic Coolidge, 3,774 m (12,382 ft)
- La Grande Ruine, 3,765 m (12,352 ft)
- Roche Faurio, 3,730 m (12,240 ft)
- Pic Bourcet, 3,715 m (12,188 ft)
- Les Bans, 3,669 m (12,037 ft)
- Les Agneaux, 3,663 m (12,018 ft)
- Pic de la Grave, 3,628 m (11,903 ft)
- Pic de Neige Cordier, 3,614 m (11,857 ft)
- Aiguille du Plat de la Selle, 3,597 m (11,801 ft)
- Les Rouies, 3,589 m (11,775 ft)
- Olan, 3,564 m (11,693 ft)
- La Plaret, 3,564 m (11,693 ft)
- Pointe Piaget, 3,569 m (11,709 ft)
- Tête de l'Etret, 3,559 m (11,677 ft)
- Tête de Gandoliere, 3,544 m (11,627 ft)
- L'Encoula, 3,533 m (11,591 ft)
- Pointe des Arcas, 3,478 m (11,411 ft)
- Roche de la Muzelle, 3,465 m (11,368 ft)
- Pointe Guyard, 3,460 m (11,350 ft)
- Tête des Fétoules, 3,459 m (11,348 ft)
- Le Sirac, 3,440 m (11,290 ft)
- Tête du Rouget, 3,435 m (11,270 ft)
- Pic de Says, 3,421 m (11,224 ft)
- Grande Aiguille de la Bérarde, 3,419 m (11,217 ft)
- Aiguille des Arias, 3,403 m (11,165 ft)
- Pointe de l'Aiglière, 3,308 m (10,853 ft)
- Pointe Swan, 3,294 m (10,807 ft)
- Le Jandri, 3,288 m (10,787 ft)
- Tetes des Soulaures, 3,242 m (10,636 ft)
- Pointe de Rougnoux, 3,179 m (10,430 ft)
- Vieux Chaillol, 3,163 m (10,377 ft)
- Têtes des Vautisse, 3,156 m (10,354 ft)
- Pic Combeynot, 3,155 m (10,351 ft)
- Aiguille Dibona, 3,130 m (10,270 ft)
- Pic des Souffles, 3,098 m (10,164 ft)
- Tête de Dormillouse, 3,084 m (10,118 ft)
- Pointe des Estaris, 3,080 m (10,100 ft)
- Le Rochail, 3,023 m (9,918 ft)
- Aiguille de Cedera, 2,883 m (9,459 ft)
- Grun de Saint Maurice, 2,776 m (9,108 ft)

== Glaciers ==
- Glacier Blanc
- Glacier Noir
