= Barre des Écrins =

Mountain in France

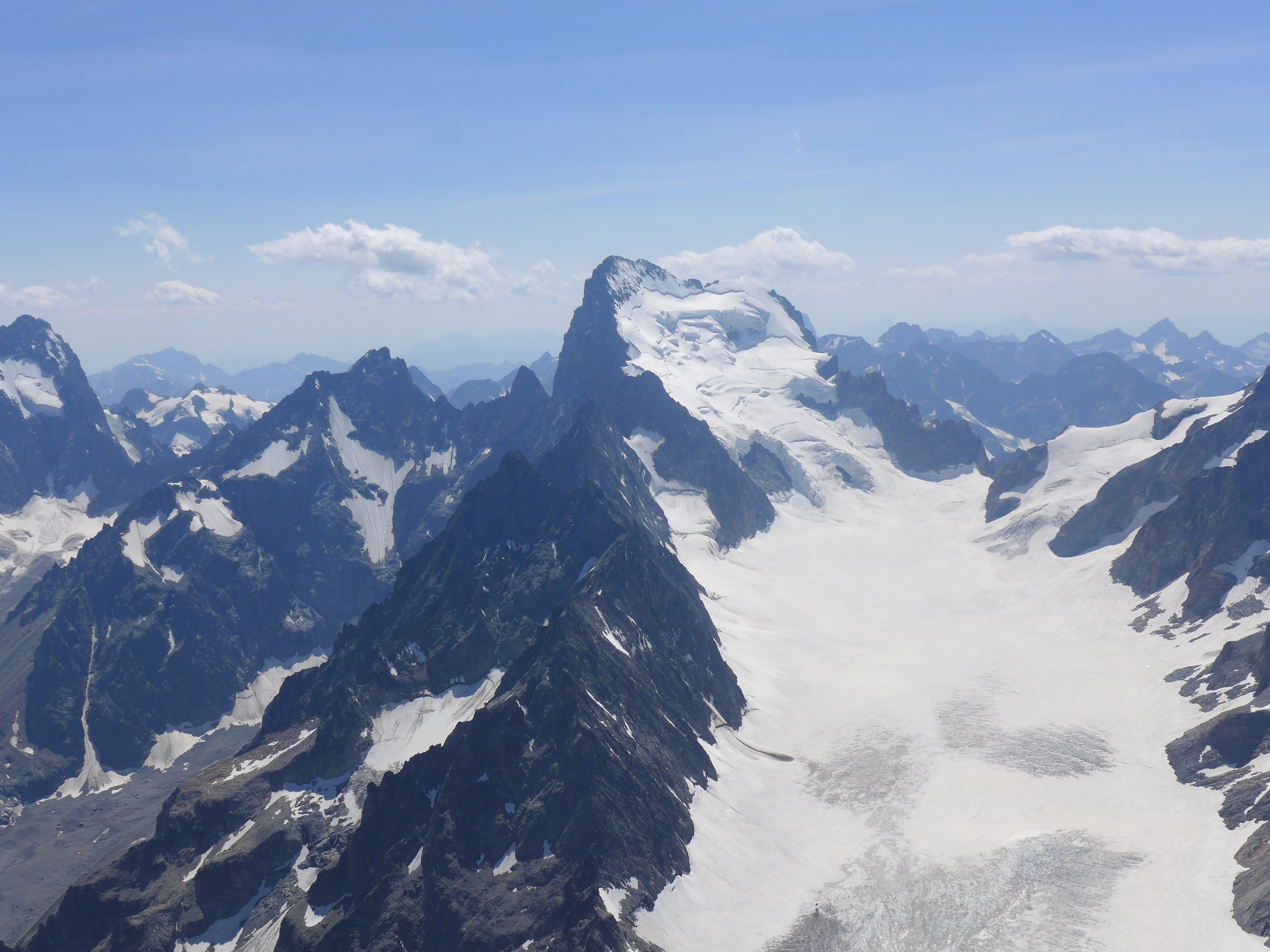
- The Barre des Écrins (4,102 m) in Hautes Alpes, France and the Glacier Blanc

Highest point
- Elevation: 4,102 m (13,458 ft)
- Prominence: 2,045 m (6,709 ft)
- Listing: Ultra
- Coordinates: 44°55′21″N 06°21′36″E

Geography
- Location within France
- Location: Hautes-Alpes, France
- Parent range: Dauphiné Alps

Climbing
- First ascent: 25 June 1864 by A. W. Moore, Horace Walker and Edward Whymper with guides Michel Croz, Christian Almer Senior and Christian Almer Junior
- Easiest route: snow/rock climb

The Barre des Écrins (French pronunciation: [baʁ dez‿ekʁɛ̃]) is a mountain in the French Alps with a peak elevation of 4,102 metres (13,458 ft). It is the highest peak of the Massif des Écrins and the Dauphiné Alps and the most southerly alpine peak in Europe that is higher than 4,000 metres. It is the only 4,000-metre mountain in France that lies outside the Mont Blanc Massif. Before the annexation of Savoy in 1860 it was the highest mountain in France.

== Geography ==
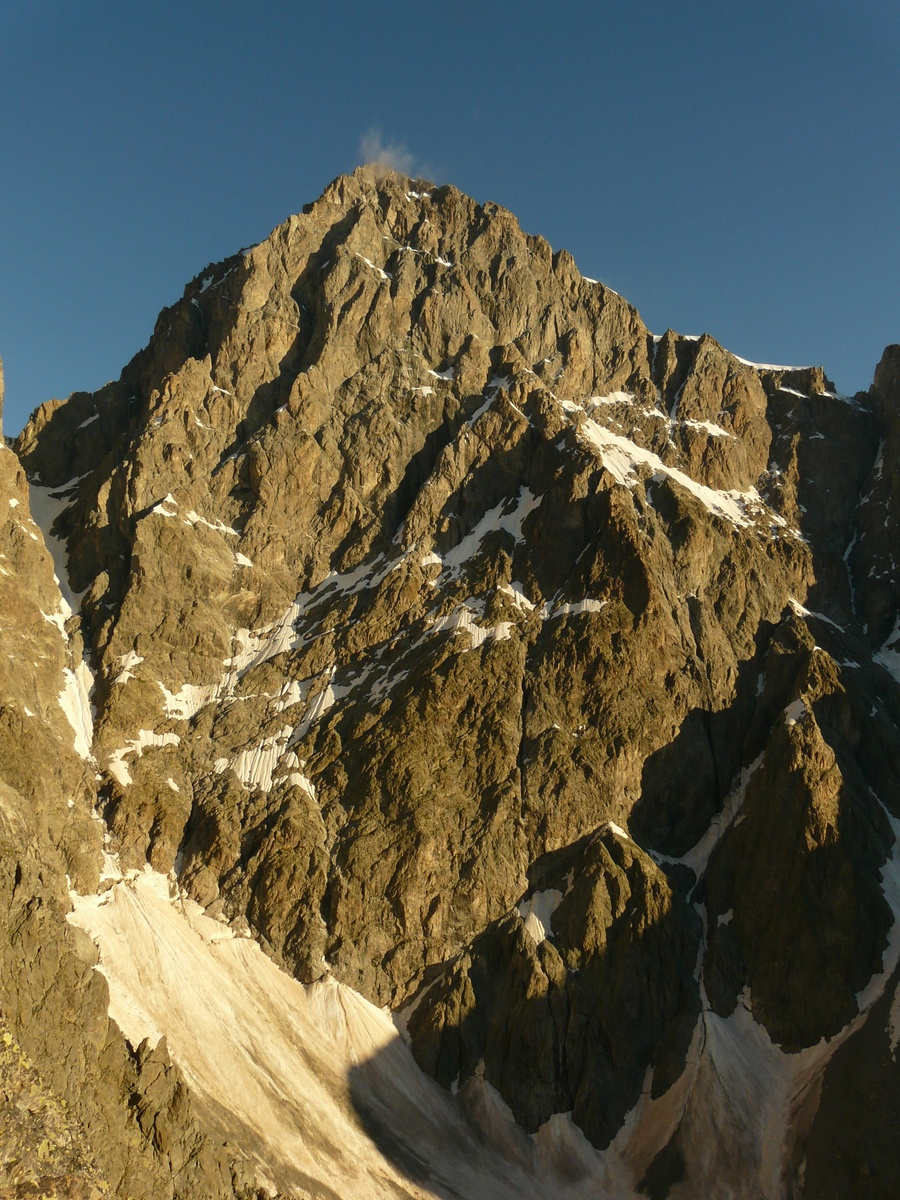
The south face of Barre des Écrins

=== Location ===
The Barre des Écrins is the highest peak in the Provence-Alpes-Côte d'Azur region including all of Occitania and the Southern Alps. It is located in the commune of Pelvoux and is situated near the Drainage divide between the Durance and the Vénéon. This divide passes 250 metres west of the summit, along the ridge that leads to the summit of the sub-peak Dôme des Écrins (4088 metres). The south face of the mountain is rocky while the north face is ice as it is the starting point of the Glacier Blanc.

The mountain is surrounded by four glaciers: to the north-west is the Bonne Pierre glacier, to the north-east the Glacier Blanc, to the south-west the Glacier du Vallon de la Pilatte, and finally in the south-east the Glacier Noir. It is separated from the Snow Dome of Écrins (4015 m) by the Lory Gap (3974 m) to the west, the Barre Noir (3751 m) by the Écrins Gap (3661 m) to the north-east and by Fifre (3699 m) via the Col des Avalanches (3499 m) to the south.

=== Geology ===
The mountain consists of migmatized gneiss, an acidic rock composed of quartz-feldspar. On the upper slopes there is an amphibolic face over the top of the migmatized gneiss forming the top. These formations overlap a large granite Pluton that forms the summit of Pelvoux.

== History ==
The Écrins were discovered by geographers belatedly in the 19th century when they were the highest point in France (Savoy being part of the Kingdom of Sardinia at that time). The mountains are actually located on the borders of the Oisans and Briançonnais with the highest point completely in Briançonnais. They were sometimes called "point of Arsines" by locals.

The Englishmen A. W Moore, Horace Walker, and Edward Whymper, guided by Michel Croz from Chamonix and Christian Almer from Switzerland, made the first ascent of the Barre des Écrins on 25 June 1864. They cut steps on the north face of the Barre until they reached the top of the eastern edge via the Whymper corridor. They then reached the top of this high ridge which was composed of very unstable rocks. Edward Whymper described the ascension in his book Scrambles Amongst the Alps in the Years 1860-69.

William Auguste Coolidge made the first direct climb up the north face of the Barre des Ecrins in July 1870 by cutting 500 steps.

The first ascent without a guide is credited to Frederick Gardiner in 1878 accompanied by Charles and Lawrence Pilkington on 19 July.

The southern face was climbed for the first time in 1880 by Pierre Gaspard together with Henri Duhamel. The south pillar, a part of the Black glacier ending at the top, was climbed for the first time in 1944 by the famous couple of climbers Jeanne and Jean Franco.

== Ascent ==
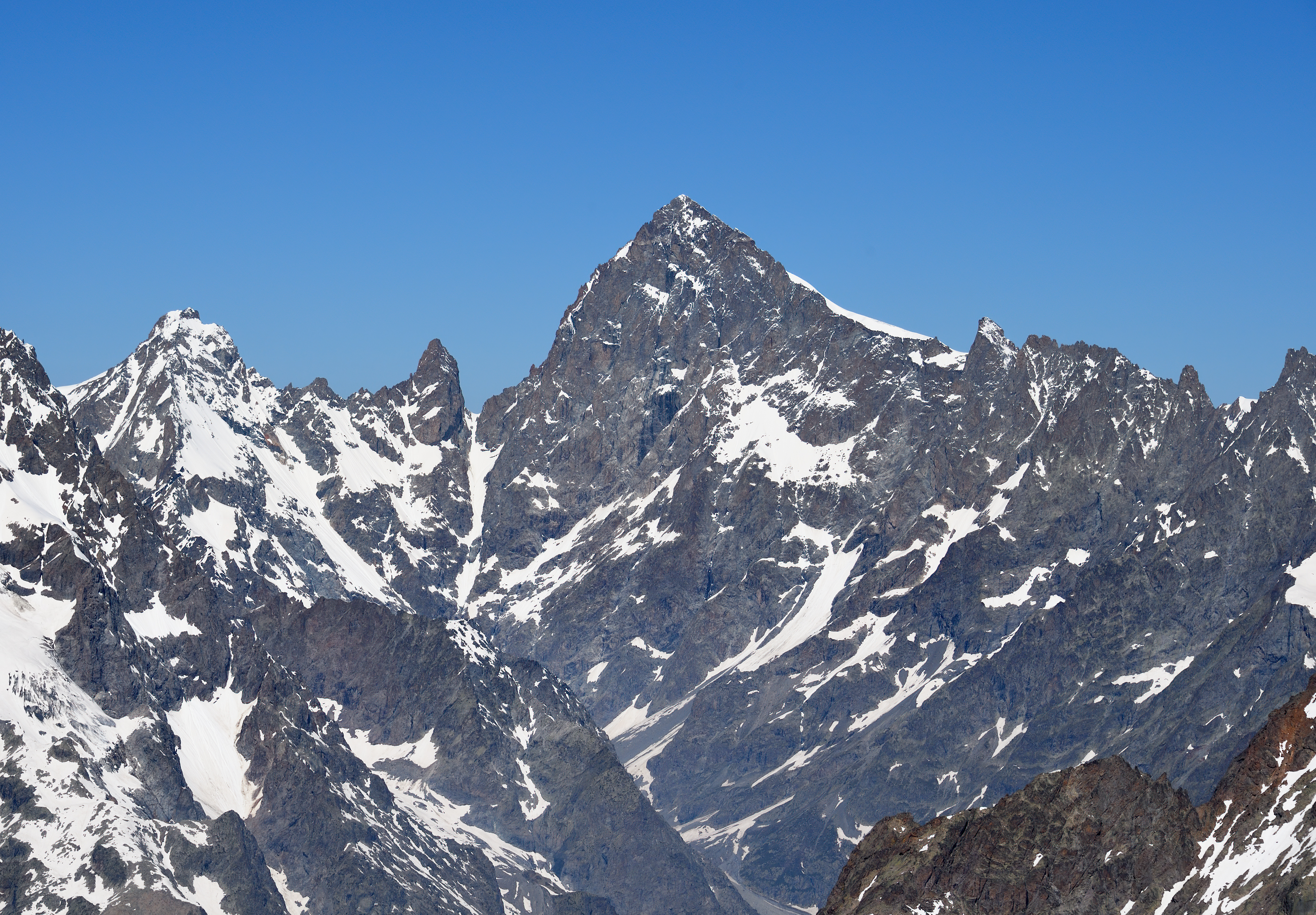
Aerial view of the Barre des Écrins from the east (at the center of the image) with Pic Coolidge, Le Fifre and Col des Avalanches (from left to right); the south-north traverse runs along the ridge to the left of Barre des Écrins

The Barre des Écrins attracts many climbers and has many routes to the top.

The mountain is traditionally scaled from the Pré de Madame Carle in the valley of Ailefroide. The normal route climbs the entire length of the Glacier Blanc. This is a much-used route, because it is the usual way to the Dôme des Écrins, one of the most easily climbed 4,000 m alpine peaks. It starts from the Refuge des Écrins and climbs the north face almost up to the Lory saddle (3,974 m), where the routes to the Dôme and the Barre divide. The ascent of the Barre continues by a rocky arête all the way to the summit. The guides from La Bérarde have equipped the Col des Écrins with cables allowing them to bring their clients to the summit.

Other more challenging routes to the summit exist, such as the South Face rated AD (Fairly Difficult). The quality of the rock on the mountain ranges from poor to average and especially on the South Face of the mountain the risk of rockfall is significant.

It is possible to climb the Direct Coolidge in late spring directly to the summit with crampons and an ice axe. Depending on snow conditions, this route can also be done on skis.

The south-north traverse of the Barre des Écrins bar is also one of the classic routes of the massif.

In summer it is possible to climb a steep path on the south face with the Pilier Sud being the most traveled route.

The record for an ascent on foot is 1 hour 55 minutes by Mathéo Jacquemoud in June 2012, starting from Pré de Madame Carle (1874 m) by the normal route of the Dôme and the Whymper corridor. He beat the old record by Hubert Fievet (2 hours 3 minutes in 1998).

The record for round-trip ski mountaineering is 2 hours 51 minutes by Nicolas Bonnet in 2009 from the Pré de Madame Carle.

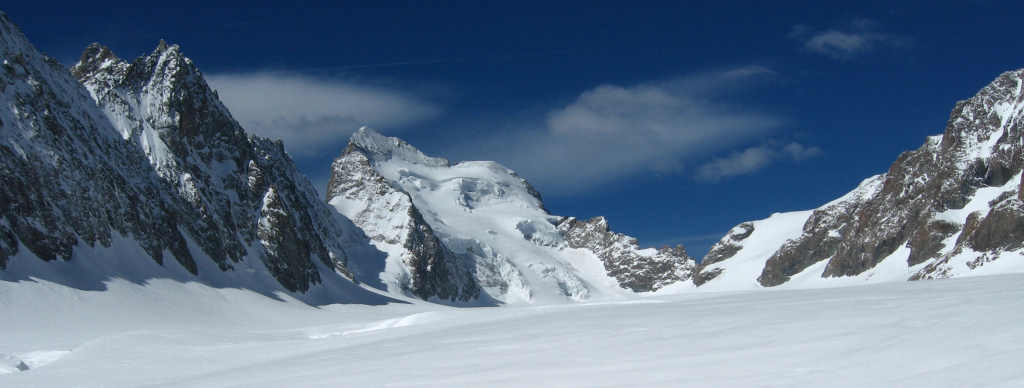
The Écrins and the Glacier Blanc

== Longest line of sight ==
The Barre des Écrins is the subject of the longest photographed and recognised line of sight on Earth. In July 2016, Marc Bret took a photograph of the mountain from the Pic de Finestrelles in the Pyrenees, some 443 km distant.

== See also ==
- List of 4000 metre peaks of the Alps
