= Hohstock =

Mountain in Switzerland

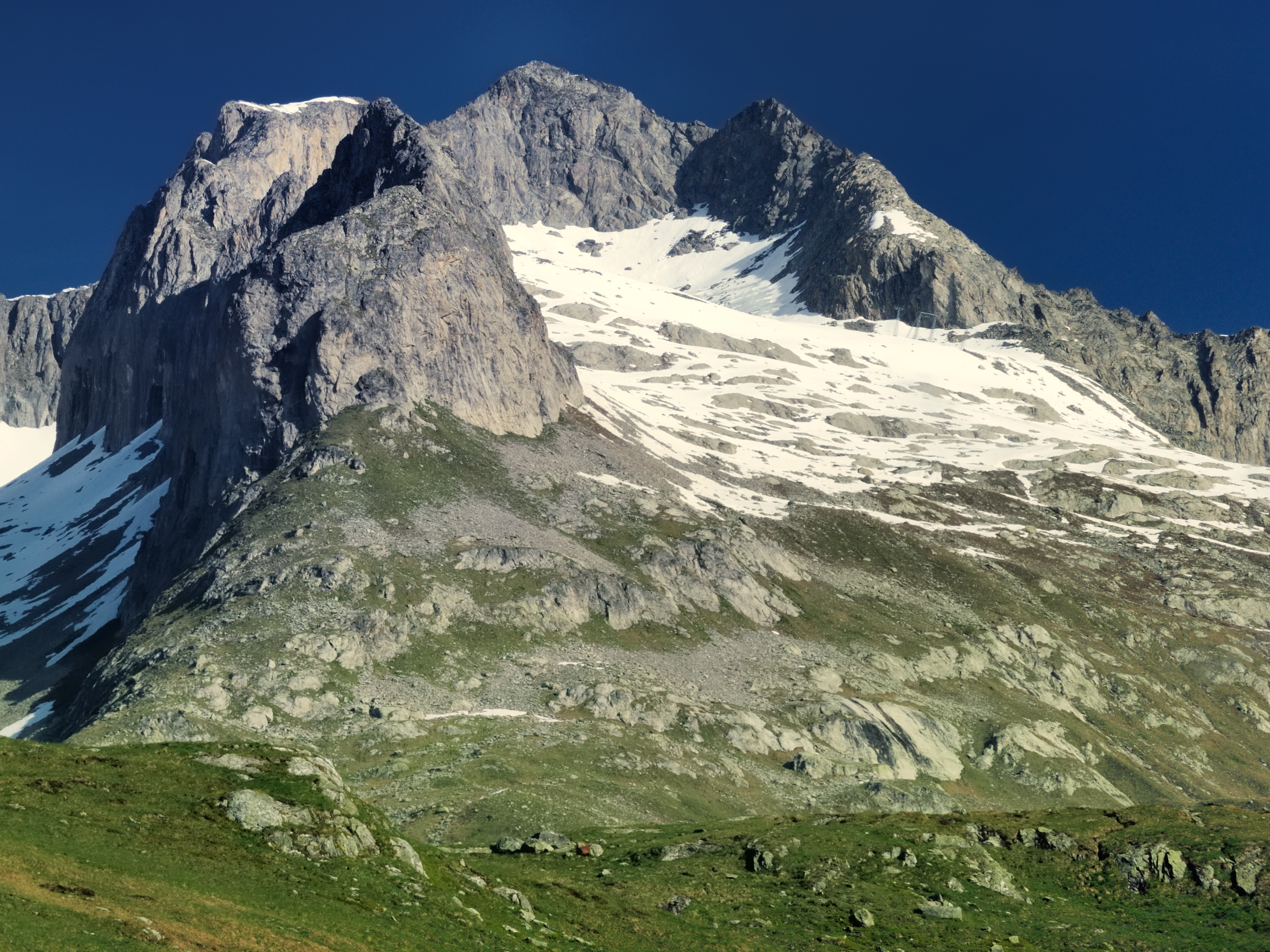
- The Hohstock from the south side

Highest point
- Elevation: 3,225 m (10,581 ft)
- Prominence: 51 m (167 ft)
- Parent peak: Bietschhorn
- Coordinates: 46°24′23″N 7°57′49″E

Geography
- Location within Switzerland
- Location: Valais, Switzerland
- Parent range: Bernese Alps

The Hohstock (3,225 m (10,581 ft) high) is a mountain of the Bernese Alps, located north of Belalp in the Swiss canton of Valais. It lies on the range east of the Unterbächhorn, between the valley of the Oberaletsch Glacier and the cirque of Belalp.

In winter the Hohstock is part of a ski area. A ski lift culminates at 3,118 m (10,230 ft) on its southeastern side. A 150-metre (490 ft) tunnel connects it to the slopes on the southwestern side.
