= Pic Coolidge =

Mountain in the French Alps

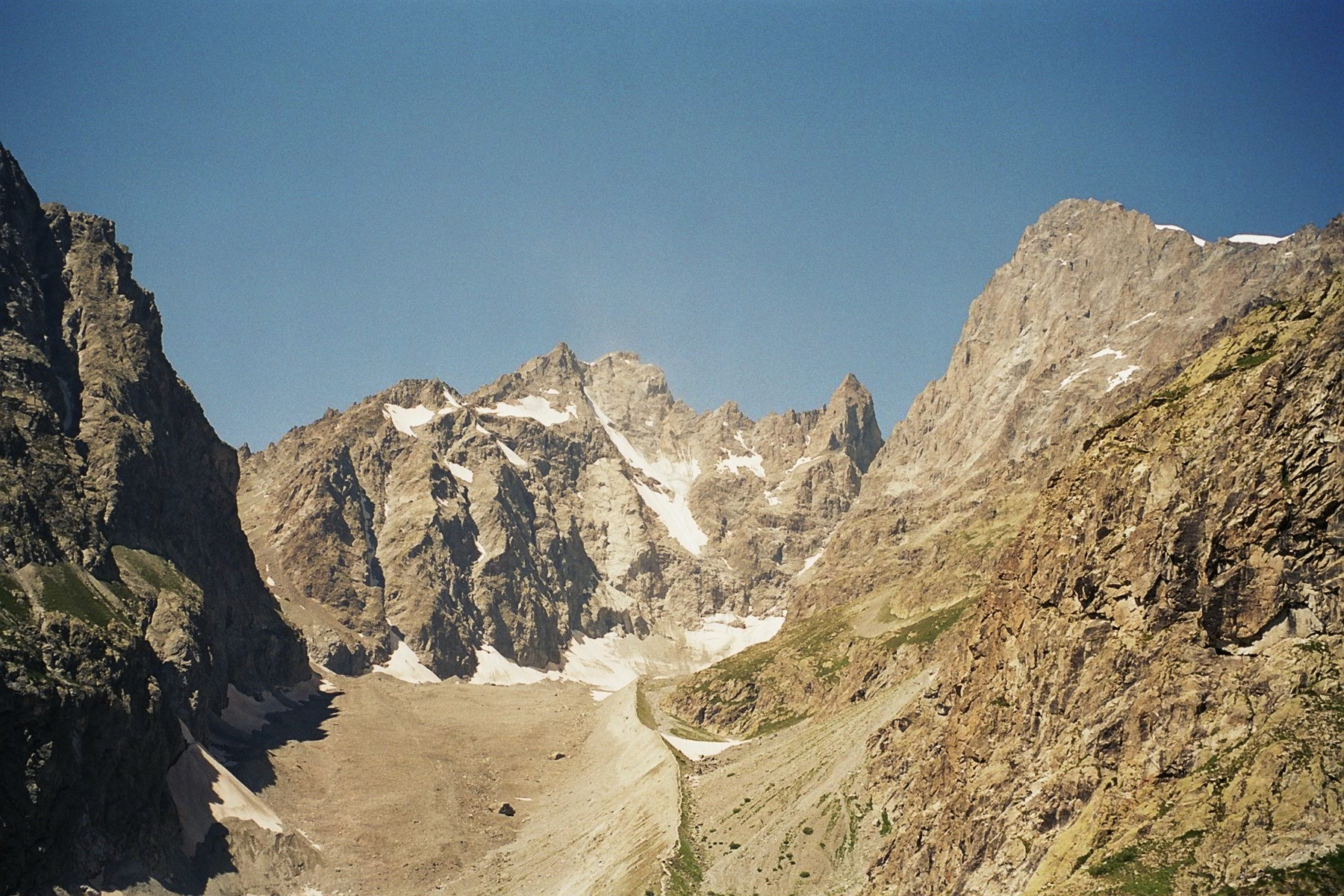

Highest point
- Elevation: 3,775 m (12,385 ft)
- Prominence: 288.4 m (946 ft)
- Coordinates: 44°54′38″N 6°21′25″E

Geography
- Location within France
- Location: Hautes-Alpes, France
- Parent range: Massif des Écrins

Pic Coolidge is a mountain in the French Alps, which forms part of the Massif des Écrins.

It bears the name of W. A. B. Coolidge, the first mountaineer to have climbed it on 14 July 1877 with his friend and Grindelwald guide Christian and Ulrich Almer, the latter's son. They made the ascent by a route different from the current Normal route. Previously, the summit was called Pointe des Verges.
