= Grandes Rousses =

Mountain range in the French Alps

- Aerial view from the southwest

Highest point
- Elevation: 3,465 m (11,368 ft)
- Parent peak: Pic Bayle
- Coordinates: 45°07′42″N 6°07′37″E

Geography
- Location within France Location within Auvergne-Rhône-Alpes
- Country: France
- Departments: Isère; Savoie
- Region: Auvergne-Rhône-Alpes
- Parent range: Dauphiné Alps

The Grandes Rousses (French pronunciation: [ɡʁɑ̃d ʁus]) is a massif in the French Alps located in the departments of Isère and Savoie. Oisans covers part of the massif.

== Geography ==
=== Location ===
The massif is oriented north–south. The eastern slope, although it is sometimes considered to extend to the Galibier and Télégraphe passes and therefore including the Arves Massif, is limited by the Arvan and Ferrand rivers. The Eau d'Olle rivers and therefore the Belledonne range to the west, and Romanche and the Écrins massif to the south form its other geographical limits.

=== Main summits ===
- Pic Bayle, 3,465 m (11,368 ft)
- Pic de l'Étendard, 3,464 m (11,365 ft)
- Pic Blanc, 3,323 m (10,902 ft)
- Cimes de la Cochette, 3,241 m (10,633 ft)
- Cime de la Barbarate, 3,226 m (10,584 ft)
- Cime du Grand Sauvage, 3,216 m (10,551 ft)
- Dôme de la Cochette, 3,041 m (9,977 ft)
- Pic de l'Herpie, 3,012 m (9,882 ft)
- Roc de la Balme, 2,872 m (9,423 ft)
- Cime de la Valette, 2,858 m (9,377 ft)
- Dôme des Petites Rousses, 2,810 m (9,220 ft)
- Rissiou, 2,622 m (8,602 ft)

=== Main glaciers ===
- Rousses glacier
- Sarenne glacier
- Quirlies glacier
- Saint-Sorlin glacier
- Barbarate glacier
- Malatres glacier

=== Main lakes ===
- Lac Blanc
- Lac des Quirlies
- Lac de la Fare
- Lac du Milieu
- Lac Besson
- Lac Noir
- Lac Carrelet
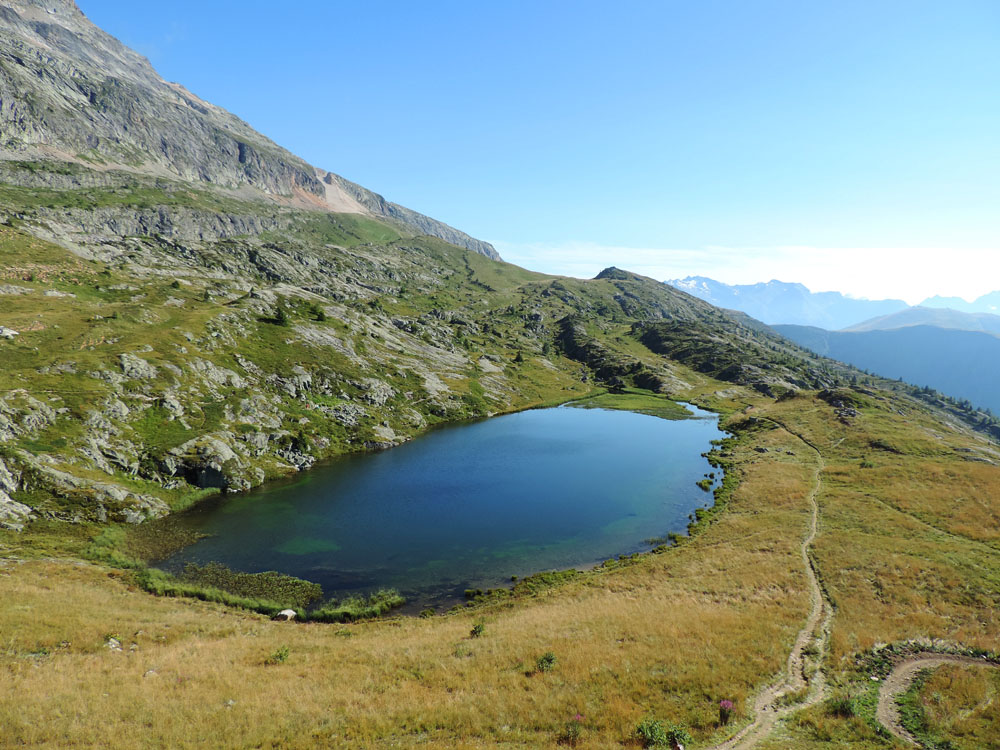
Lac Carrelet

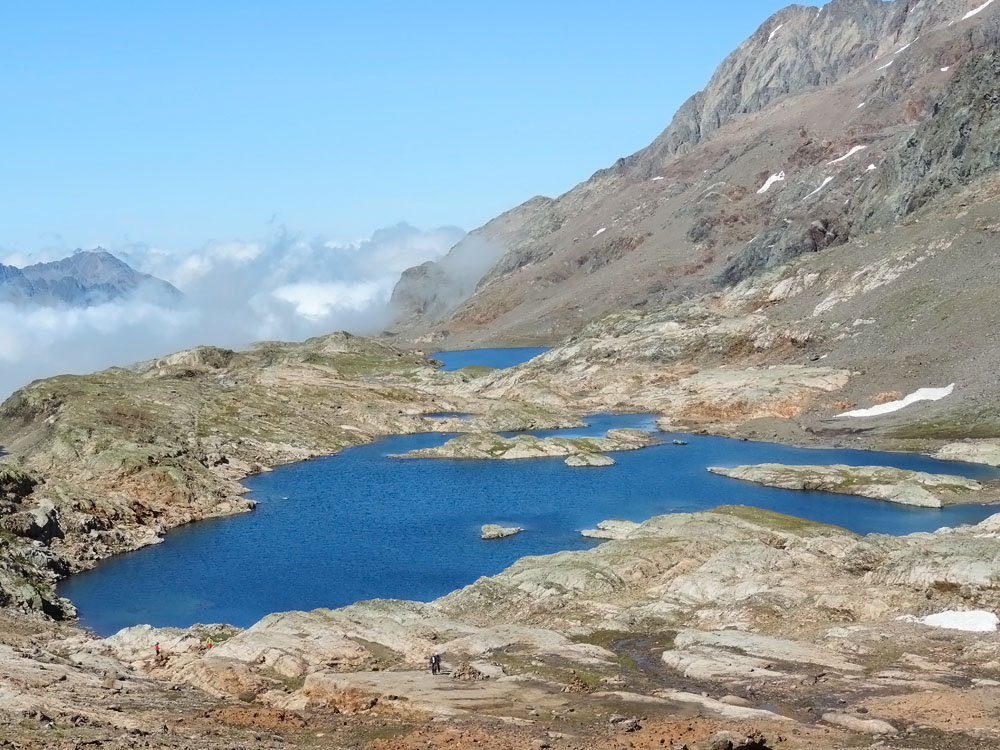
Lac du Milieu

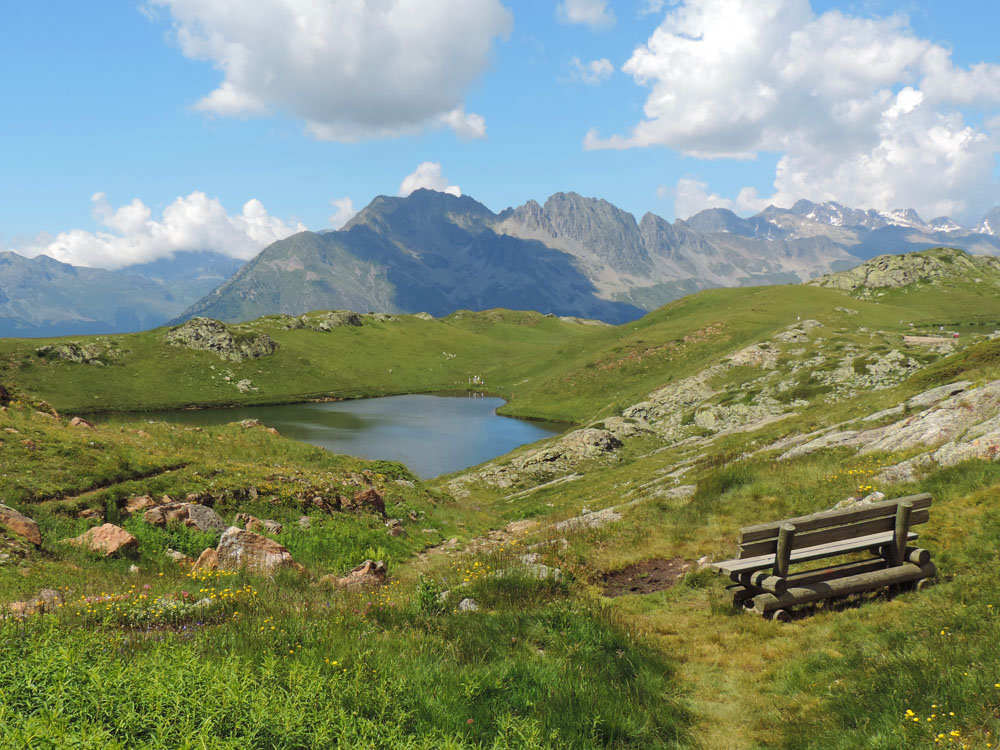
Lac Noir

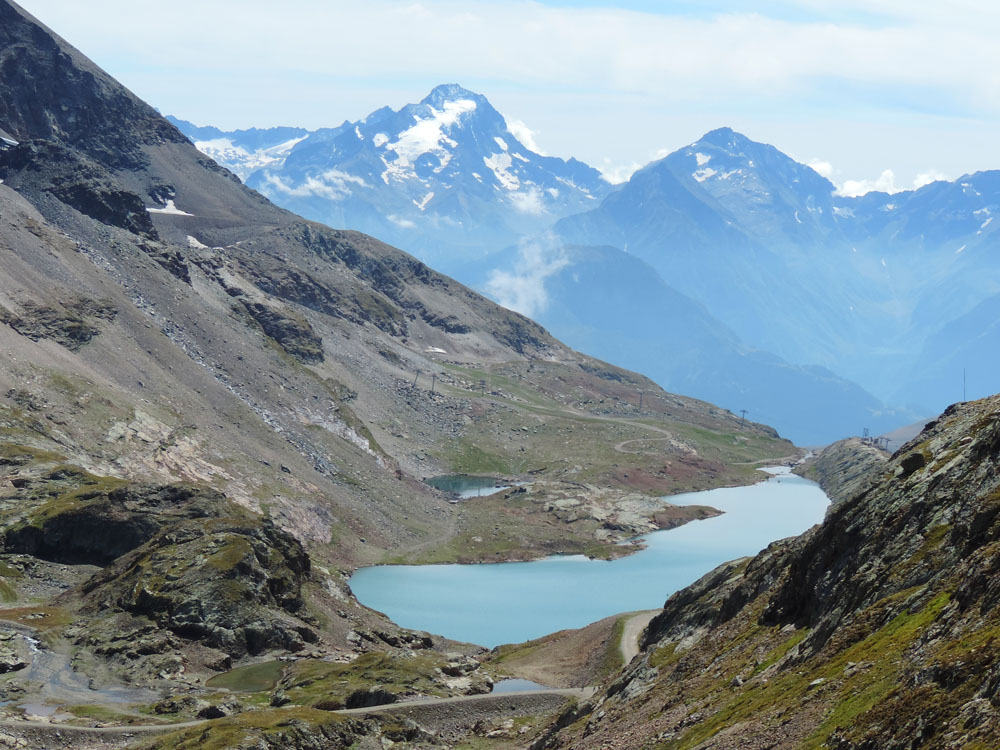
Lac Blanc

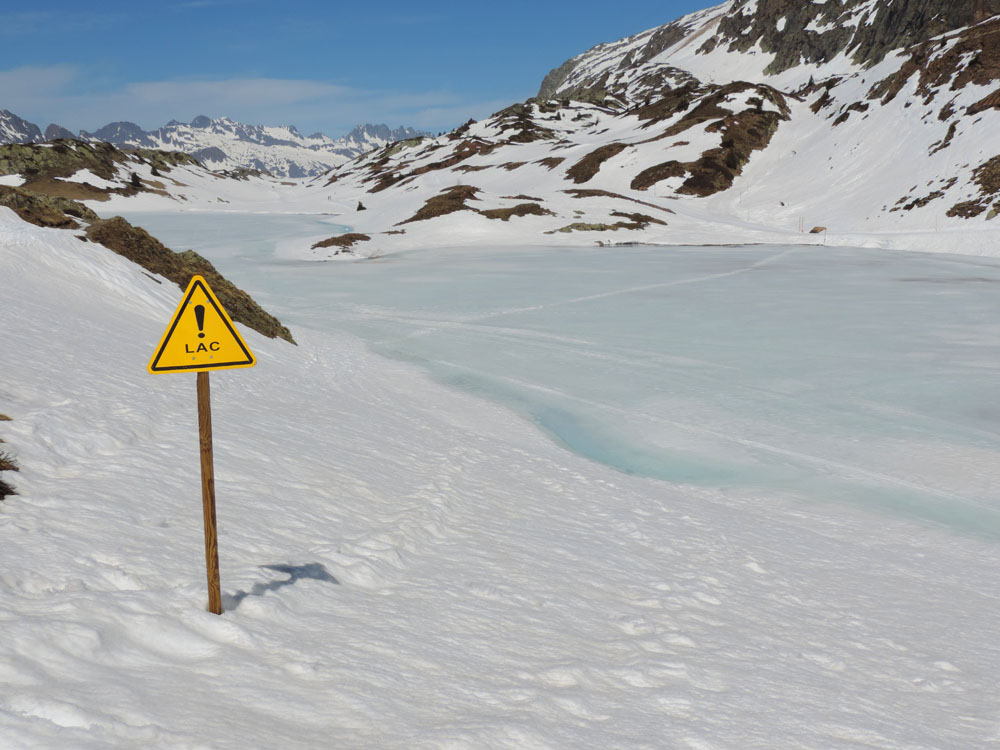
Lac Besson in winter

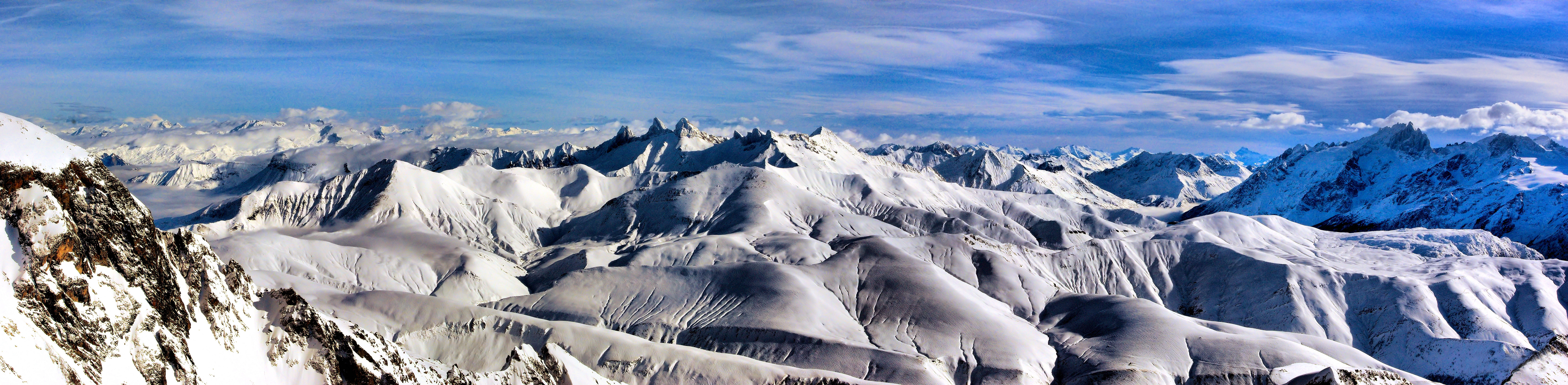
View from the Grandes Rousses massif towards the east with the Aiguilles d'Arves in the center

=== Geology ===
The Grandes Rousses Massif is a crystalline geological formation similar to the nearby Belledonne range. It forms a long, north–south oriented chain, appearing as a northern extension of the Écrins Massif. The massif is characterized by several north–south bands, many of which are separated by structural depressions from the late Hercynian period. These depressions, likely synclines or grabens, are filled with coal-bearing lands, some of which show Triassic deposits lying at 90 degrees.

== History ==
The Grandes Rousses Massif is dotted with numerous abandoned mines. The most notable site is Brandes-en-Oisans, a mining village that operated silver mines from the 12th to the 14th century. Located in the commune of Huez at an altitude of over 1,800 meters, Brandes-en-Oisans once had up to 80 buildings centered around a church. Although of moderate importance on a European scale, Brandes was of significant importance to the Dauphiné region.
