= Ulrich Almer =

Swiss mountain guide (1849–1940)

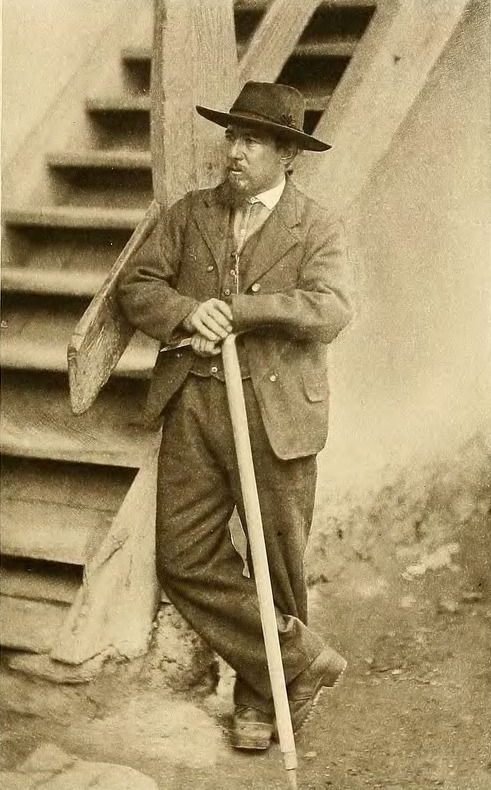
- Born: 8 May 1849; Grindelwald
- Died: 4 September 1940; Grindelwald
- Occupations: Mountain guide, mountaineer
- Parents: Christian Almer (father); Margaritha Kaufmann (mother)

Ulrich Almer (8 May 1849 in Grindelwald – 4 September 1940) was a Swiss mountain guide. He made many premieres in the Alps with his father Christian Almer, one of the great guides of the golden age of mountaineering, and was one of the first Swiss guides to visit the Caucasus.

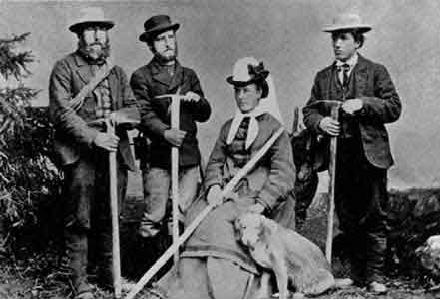
Christian Almer, Ulrich Almer, Meta Brevoort and William Coolidge in 1874.

== Biography ==
Ulrich Almer performed about fifteen premieres including those of the Aiguille de Blaitière and Aiguille de Triolet. In 1874, on the descent after an attempt at the south face of Mont Blanc, his roped party fell into a crevasse on the Brouillard glacier, JAG Marshal and Johann Fischer dying instantly; Ulrich Almer, unconscious but unharmed, managed to get out of the crevasse and joined Courmayeur. Thirty-eight years later, in 1912, during a descent of the Aletschhorn, it was the turn of Andreas Fisher, Johann Fischer's son, and the same guide, to be the victim of a fall in a crevasse. Ulrich Almer's reputation was definitely tarnished.

== Ascents ==
- 1870 - Premiere of Ailefroide with William Auguste Coolidge with Christian Almer and Ch. Gertsch, on 7 July
- 1873 - Premiere of the northern tip of the Aiguille de Blaitière with Thomas Stuart Kennedy, J. A. G. Marshall and Johann Fisher
- 1874 - Premiere of the aiguille de Triolet with J. A. G. Marshall and Johann Fisher, on 26 August
- 1874 - Attempt on the south face of Mont Blanc with J. G. A. Marshal and Johann Fisher, on 31 August. They had probably made in passing the first point of the point which will be called later pic Eccles
- 1875 - Premiere of the roche de la Muzelle with W. A. Coolidge and Christian Almer, on 2 July
- 1876 - Premiere of the western summit of Droites, with W.A. Coolidge and Christian Almer, on 18 July
- 1876 - First of the south-eastern ridge of Täschhorn with James Jackson
- 1877 - Pic Coolidge with William Auguste Coolidge and Christian Almer, on 14 July
- 1891 - First crossing of Meije in a west–east direction from the Grand Pic to the Doigt de Dieu with J.-H. Gibson and Fritz Boss
- 1883 - First ascent of the northwest ridge of the Schreckhorn via Andersongrat route with Aloys Pollinger, John Stafford Anderson and G. P. Baker
- 1884 - First crossing of the Breithorn with John Stafford Anderson and Aloys Pollinger, on 16 August, making in passing the first of the secondary summits of the Eastern Breithorn, the Breithornzwillinge and the Roccia Nera, considered today in the list of 82 Alpine summits over 4000 meters)
- 1888 - First ascent of the northern summit of Ushba (Caucasus) with John Garford Cockin
- 1888 - First ascent of Shkhara with J. Cockin and C. Roth
