= W. A. B. Coolidge =

American historian and mountaineer (1850–1926)

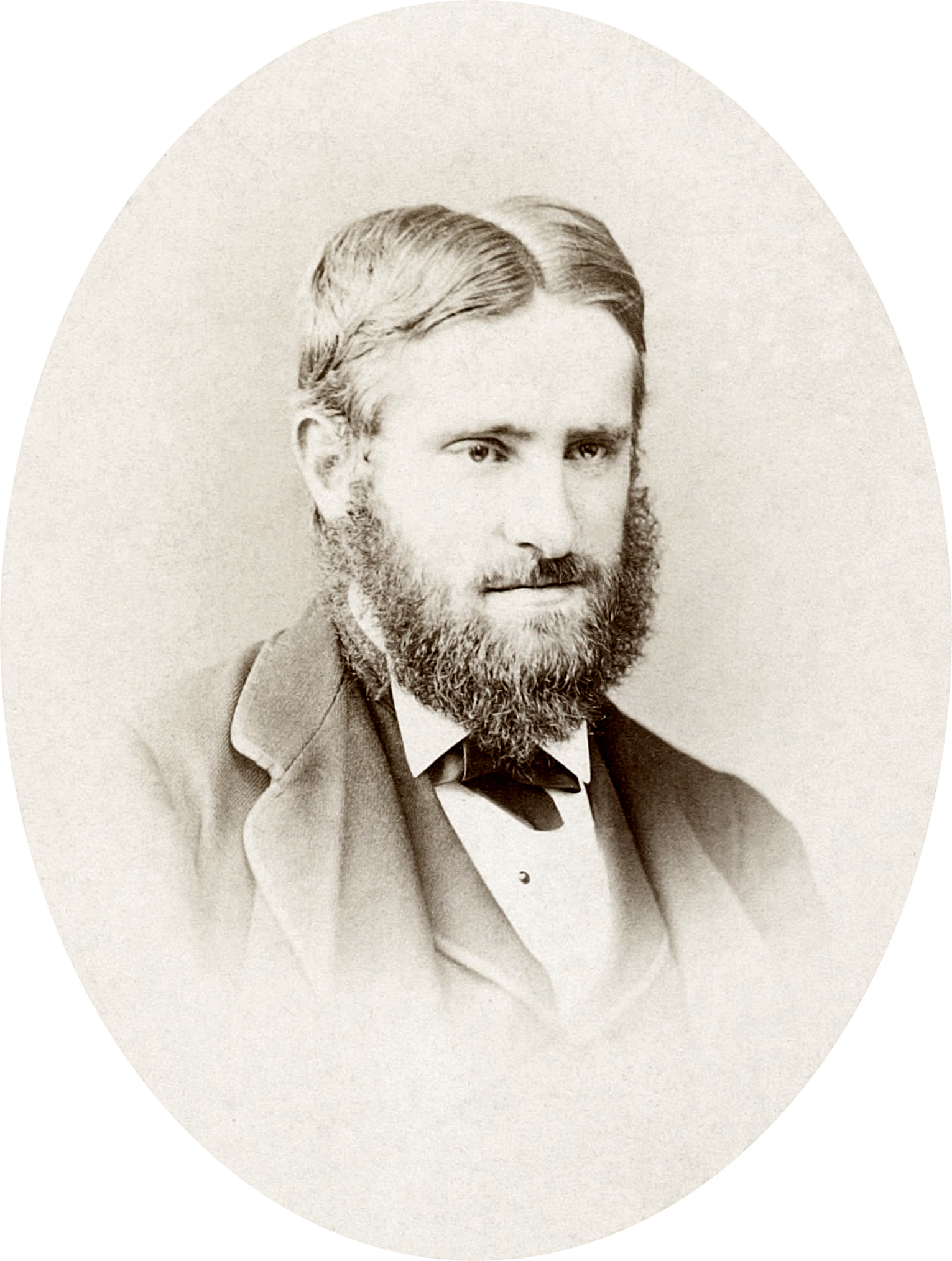
William Augustus Brevoort Coolidge

William Augustus Brevoort Coolidge (/ˈkuːlɪdʒ/; August 28, 1850 – May 8, 1926) was an American historian, theologian and mountaineer.

== Early life and education ==
William Augustus Brevoort Coolidge was born in New York City in 1850 as the son of Frederic William Skinner Coolidge, a Boston merchant, and Elisabeth Neville Brevoort, sister of James Carson Brevoort and Meta Brevoort. Coolidge studied history and law at St. Paul's School in Concord, New Hampshire, at Elizabeth College, Guernsey, and at Exeter College, Oxford. In 1870 at the age of twenty he was made a member of the Alpine Club (UK).

== Career ==
In 1875, he became a Fellow of Magdalen College, Oxford. From 1880 to 1881 he was professor of British history at Saint David's College in Lampeter. In 1883, age 33, he became a priest of the Anglican church.

Coolidge became one of the great figures of the so-called silver age of alpinism, making first ascents of the few significant peaks in the Alps that had not been climbed during the golden age of alpinism. On many of these climbs he was accompanied by his aunt, Meta Brevoort, and a pet dog, Tschingel, given to him by one of his guides, Christian Almer.

=== First ascents in the Alps ===
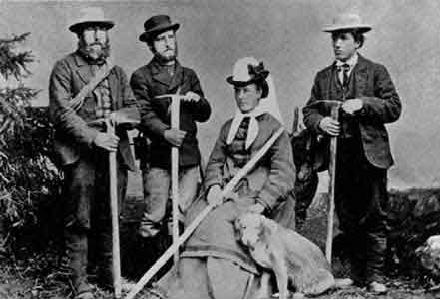
Christian Almer, Ulrich Almer, Meta Brevoort and William Coolidge in 1874.

- Piz Badile, 27 July 1867, with François Devouassoud and Henri Devouassoud
- Ailefroide, 7 July 1870, with Christian Almer and Ulrich Almer
- Central peak of La Meije, 1870, with Meta Brevoort and three guides
- Unterbächhorn, 1872
- First winter ascent of the Jungfrau, January 1874, with Christian and Ulrich Almer
- West summit of Les Droites, 16 July 1876, with Christian and Ulrich Almer
- Pic Coolidge, July 1877 with Christian and Ulrich Almer
- Les Bans, 14 July 1878, with Christian and Ulrich Almer
- Southern Peak of the Aiguilles d'Arves, 22 July 1878, with Christian and Ulrich Almer
- Monte Matto, 14 July 1879, with Christian and Ulrich Almer
- Aiguille de Chambeyron, 1879, with Christian Almer.
- Scherbadung, 1886
- Chüebodenhorn, 1892
- Pic des Houerts, 18 July 1881 with Christian Almer and Ulrich Almer

== Personal life and death ==
In 1885, at age 35 he moved to Grindelwald, Switzerland, where he died in 1926, age 76.

== Selected publications ==
- Swiss travel and Swiss guide-books. Longmans, Green, and co. 1889.
- The central Alps of the Dauphiny. 1892.
- Climbers' guides: Adula Alps of the Lepontine Range (T. Fisher Unwin, 1893)
- Walks and excursions in the valley of Grindelwald. J.H. Luf. 1900.
- The Alps in nature and history. E.P. Dutton and company. 1908.
- Alpine studies. Longmans, Green and co. 1912.
