= Pic de l'Étendard =

Mountain in France

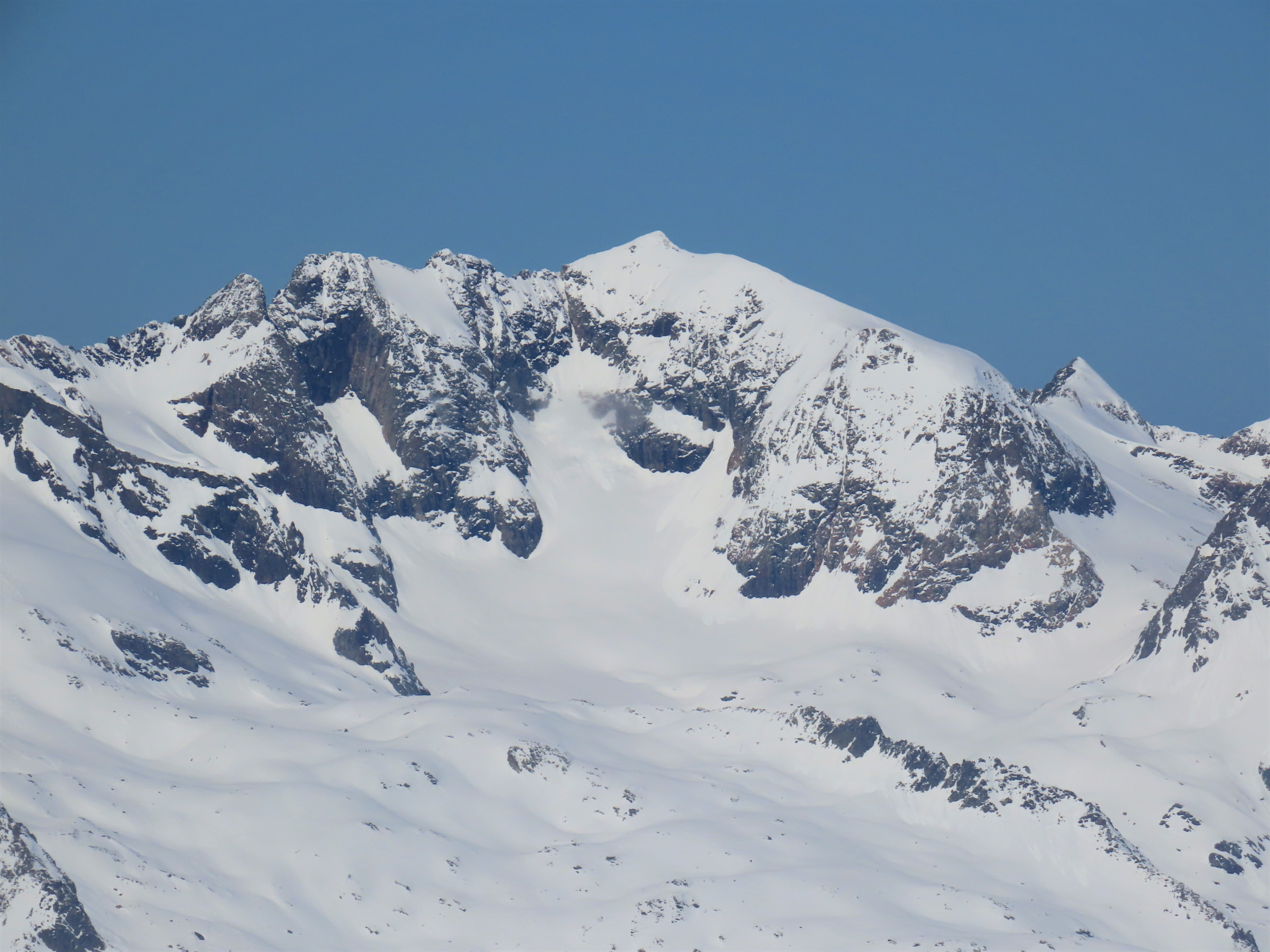
- South aspect

Highest point
- Elevation: 3,464 m (11,365 ft)
- Prominence: 181 m (594 ft)
- Parent peak: Pic Bayle
- Isolation: 1.97 km (1.22 mi)
- Listing: Alps above 3000 m
- Coordinates: 45°09′16″N 6°08′38″E

Geography
- Location within Alps Location within France
- Interactive map of Pic de l'Étendard
- Country: France
- Departments: Isère / Savoie
- Region: Auvergne-Rhône-Alpes
- Protected area: Écrins National Park
- Parent range: Alps; Dauphiné Alps

Geology
- Rock type: Gneiss

Climbing
- First ascent: 1863

Pic de l'Étendard is a mountain in the Auvergne-Rhône-Alpes region of France.

== Description ==
Pic de l'Étendard is a 3,464-metre-elevation (11,365-foot) summit in the Dauphiné Alps of the French Alps. It is the second-highest point of the Massif des Grandes Rousses, and only one metre lower than the highest point, Pic Bayle. The peak is located on the periphery of Écrins National Park and ranks as the sixth-highest peak in the park. Precipitation runoff from the mountain drains into tributaries of the Rhône. Topographic relief is significant as the summit rises 2,260 metres (7,415 feet) above Le Flumet valley in four kilometres (2.5 mi). The first ascent of the summit was achieved on August 6, 1863, by Thomas George Bonney, Michel Croz, William Mathews, George Mathews, and Joseph Basile Simond. The first winter ascent was made on December 26, 1897, by Louis Poncin and Édouard Sauvage. The toponym Pic de l'Étendard translates to English as "Standard Peak" or "Banner Peak."

== Climate ==
According to the Köppen climate classification system, Pic de l'Étendard is located in an alpine climate zone. Weather fronts are forced upward by the Alps (orographic lift), causing moisture to drop in the form of rain or snowfall onto the range. This climate supports the Barbarate, Quirlies, and Saint-Sorlin glaciers on the slopes of the peak.

== See also ==
- Climate of the Alps

== Gallery ==
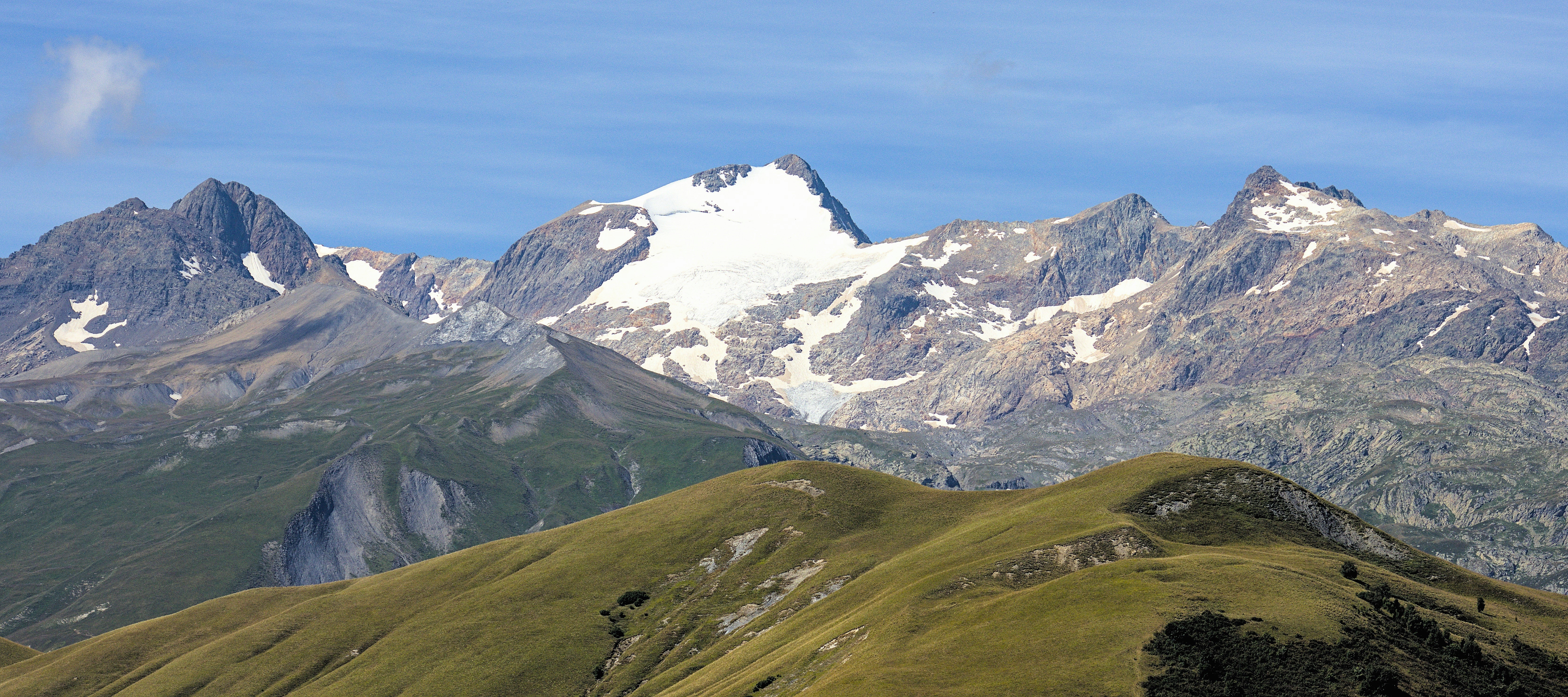
Northeast aspect

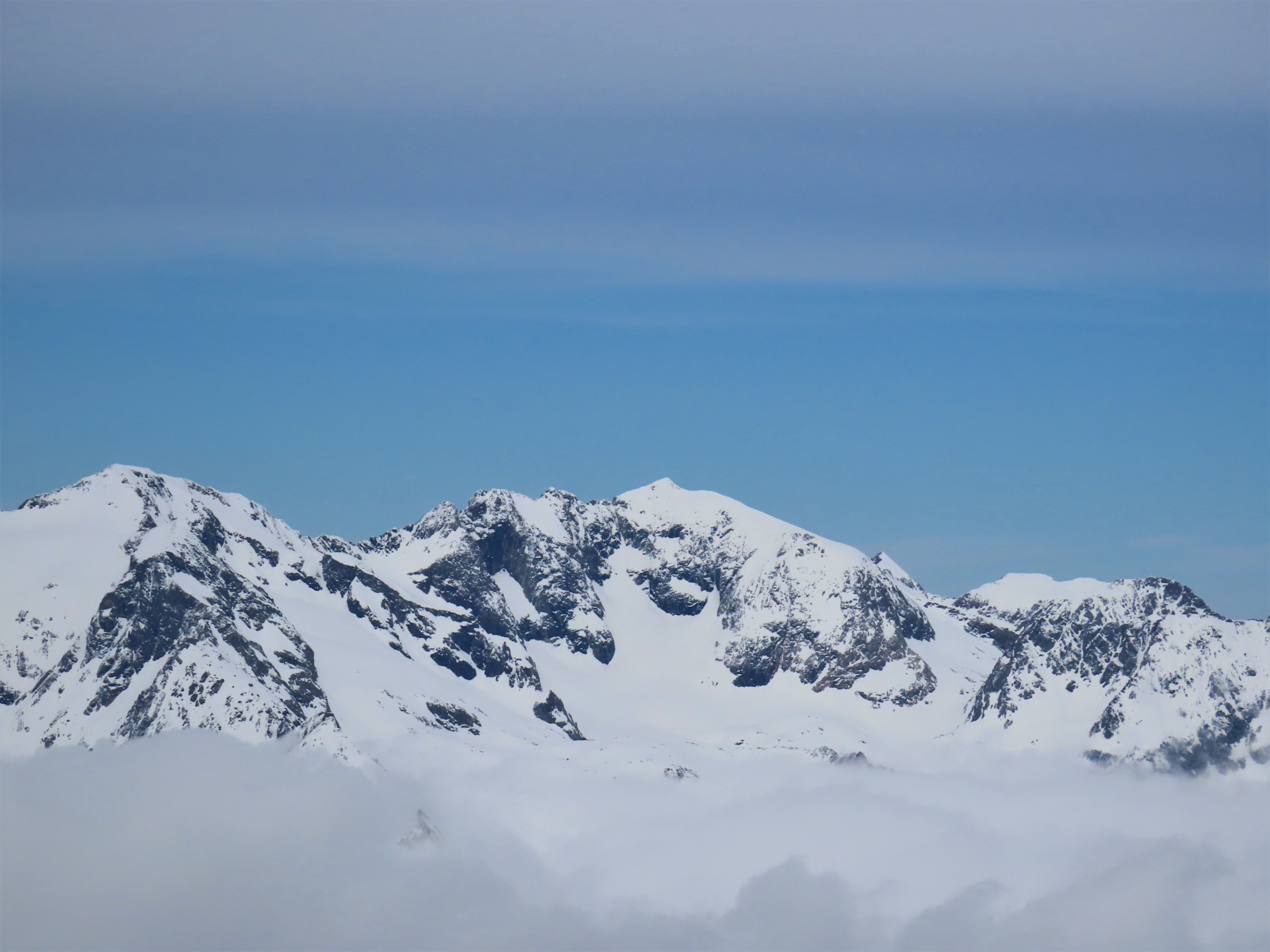
Pic de l'Étendard centered, Pic Bayle to left

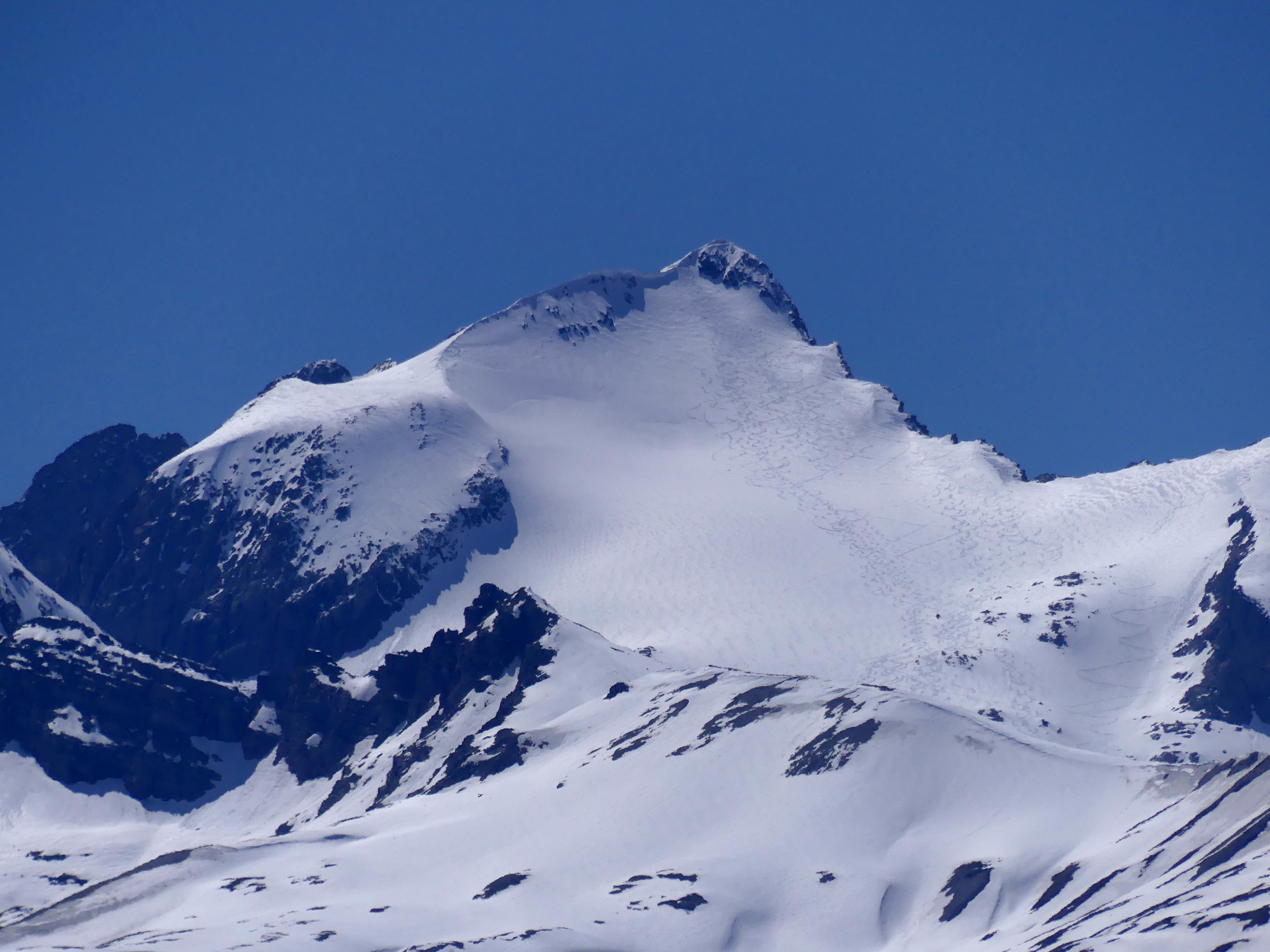
Northeast aspect of summit
