= Aiguilles d'Arves =

Mountain in France

Aiguilles d’Arves
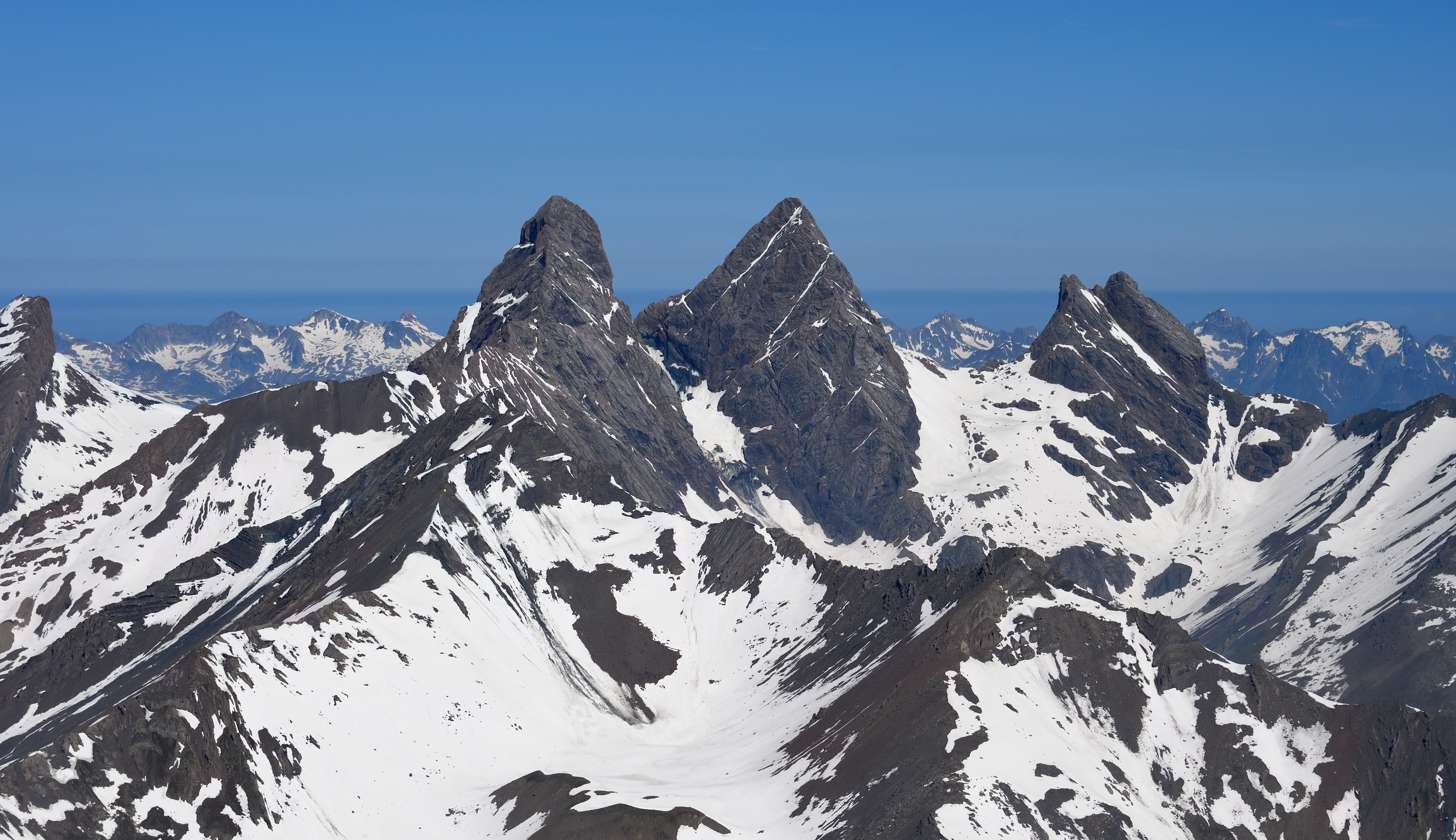
- The Aiguilles d'Arves, seen from the air from the southeast. From left to right: Aiguille Méridionale, Aiguille Centrale and Aiguille Septentrionale.

Highest point
- Elevation: 3,514 m (11,529 ft)(Aiguille Méridionale)
- Prominence: 1,429 m (4,688 ft)
- Listing: French Alps Peaks with 600 metres of Prominence (Rank #9); Alpine mountains above 3000 m
- Coordinates: 45°07′23″N 6°20′04″E

Geography
- Location within France
- Location: Savoie, France
- Parent range: Dauphiné Alps
- Topo map(s): TOP25 Series, Map 3435ET, Valloire, Aiguilles d'Arves, Col du Galibier, IGN

Climbing
- First ascent: Almer and Coolidge, 1878 (Aiguille Méridionale)
- Easiest route: rock/snow climb

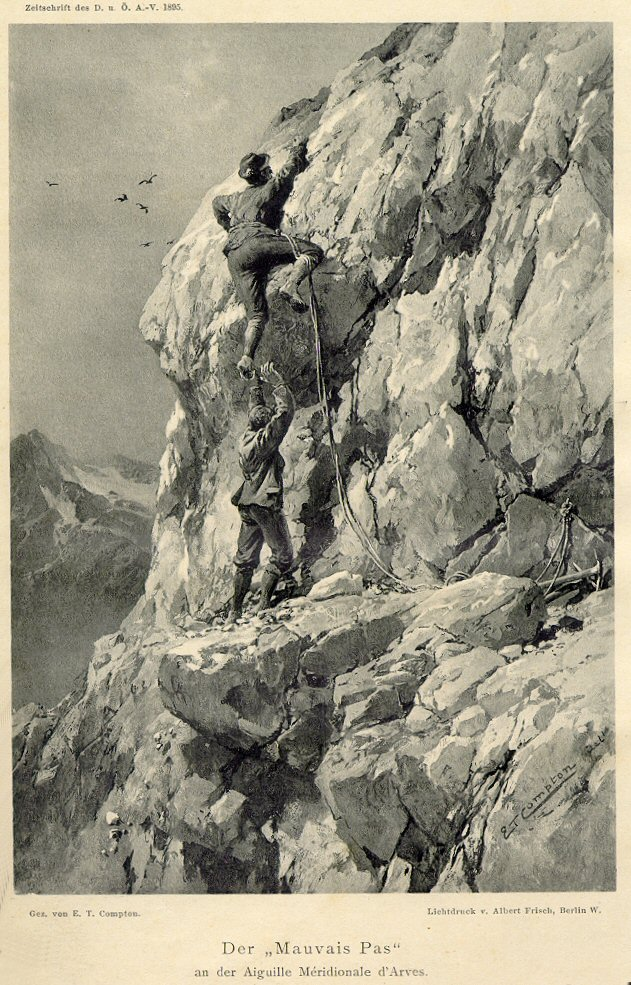
The 'bad step' on the Aiguille Méridionale d’Arves showing L. Purtscheller and Karl Blodig. Illustration by E.Compton, 1895.

The Aiguilles d’Arves (3,514 metres (11,529 ft)) is a mountain in the Arves Massif in the French Alps. The mountain, comprising three separate peaks (in French Aiguille), is the highest point of the massif, and is located in the department of Savoie.

== Geography ==
The summits that make up the Aiguilles d'Arves are described in the following table.

Name	Translation	Height	First ascent
L’Aiguille Meridionale	The Southern Needle	3,514 metres (11,529 ft)	Father and son Almer and W. A. B. Coolidge, 22 July 1878
L’Auguille Centrale	The Central Needle	3,513 metres (11,526 ft)	Pierre Alexis and Benoît Nicolas Magnin in 1839
L’Aiguille Septentrionale, Bec Nord	The Northern Needle	3,364 metres (11,037 ft)	Coolidge, father and son Almer, 23 July 1878
L’Aiguille Septentrionale, Bec Sud	The Northern Needle	3,358 metres (11,017 ft)	Meta Brevoort, Coolidge, father and son Almer, in 1873

For reasons apparent from the picture, Aiguille Septentrionale is also called the Tête de Chat (Cat Head).

== Ascents ==
The central peak of the Aiguilles d’Arves was first climbed by the brothers Pierre Alexis and Benoît Nicolas Magnin, from nearby Saint-Michel-de-Maurienne, on 2 September 1839. As evidence they built a cairn and left two Sardinian coins under a rock on the summit.

The southern summit was first climbed by the Swiss mountain guides Christian and Ulrich Almer and their American client, W. A. B. Coolidge from New York. During the 1870s and 1880s, Coolidge claimed a number of first ascents and worked extensively in the Dauphiné Alps. Earlier, the same party had climbed L’Auguille Centrale in 1874. On the summit, they found the cairn built by the Magnin brothers, but ascribed it to "a legendary chamois hunter". The day after their ascent of L’Aiguille Meridionale in 1878, Benoît Magnin informed them about his ascent 39 years prior.
