= Sparrhorn =

Mountain in Switzerland

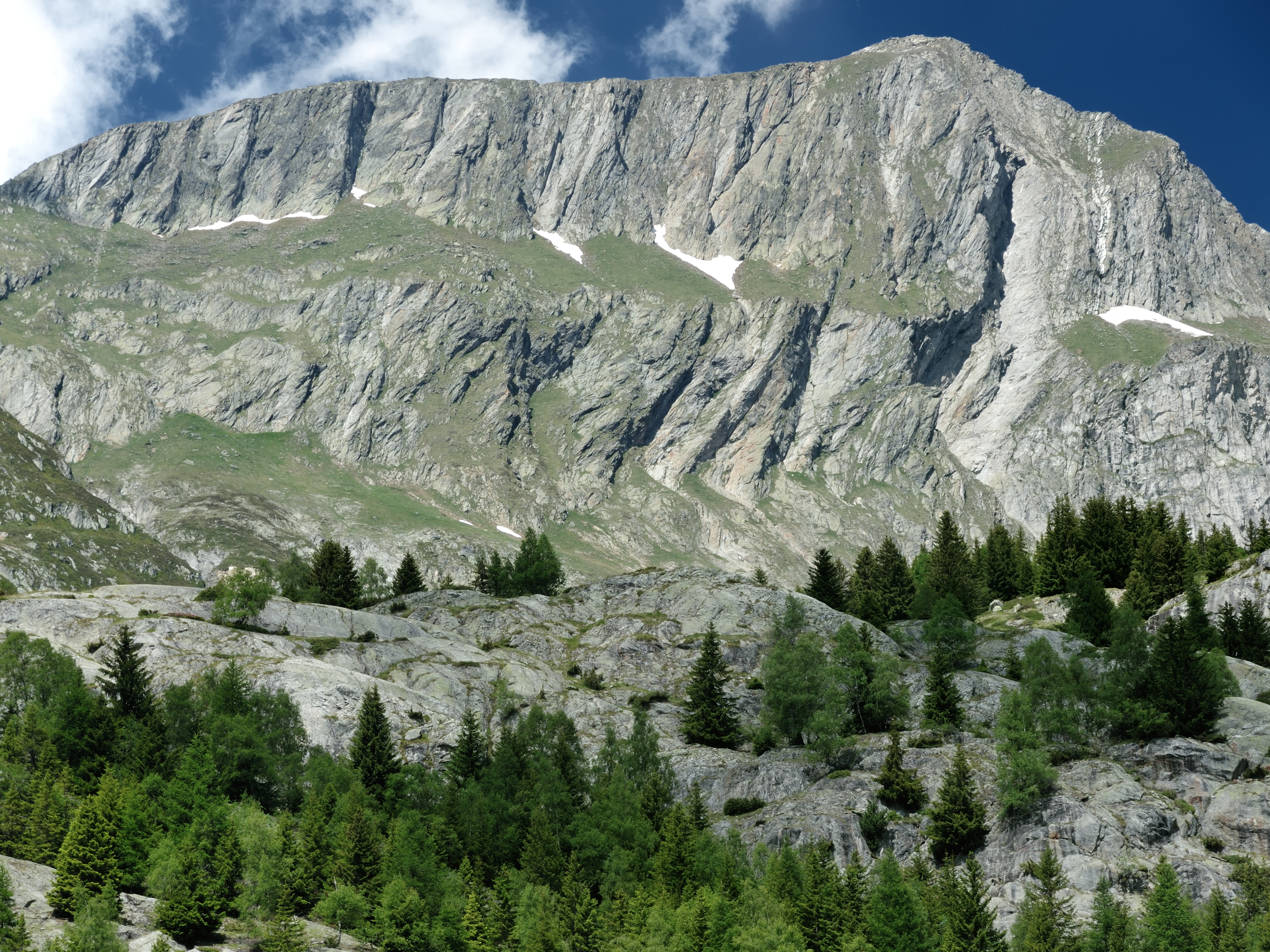
- The Sparrhorn from the east side

Highest point
- Elevation: 3,020 m (9,910 ft)
- Prominence: 20 m (66 ft)
- Coordinates: 46°24′15.7″N 7°59′2.9″E

Geography
- Location within Switzerland
- Location: Valais, Switzerland
- Parent range: Bernese Alps

The Sparrhorn (3,020 m) is a mountain of the Bernese Alps, located north of Belalp in the canton of Valais. It lies at the eastern end of the range located south of the Oberaletsch Glacier, west of the Aletsch Glacier.

From Belalp a trail leads to its summit.
