= Unterbächhorn =

Mountain in Switzerland

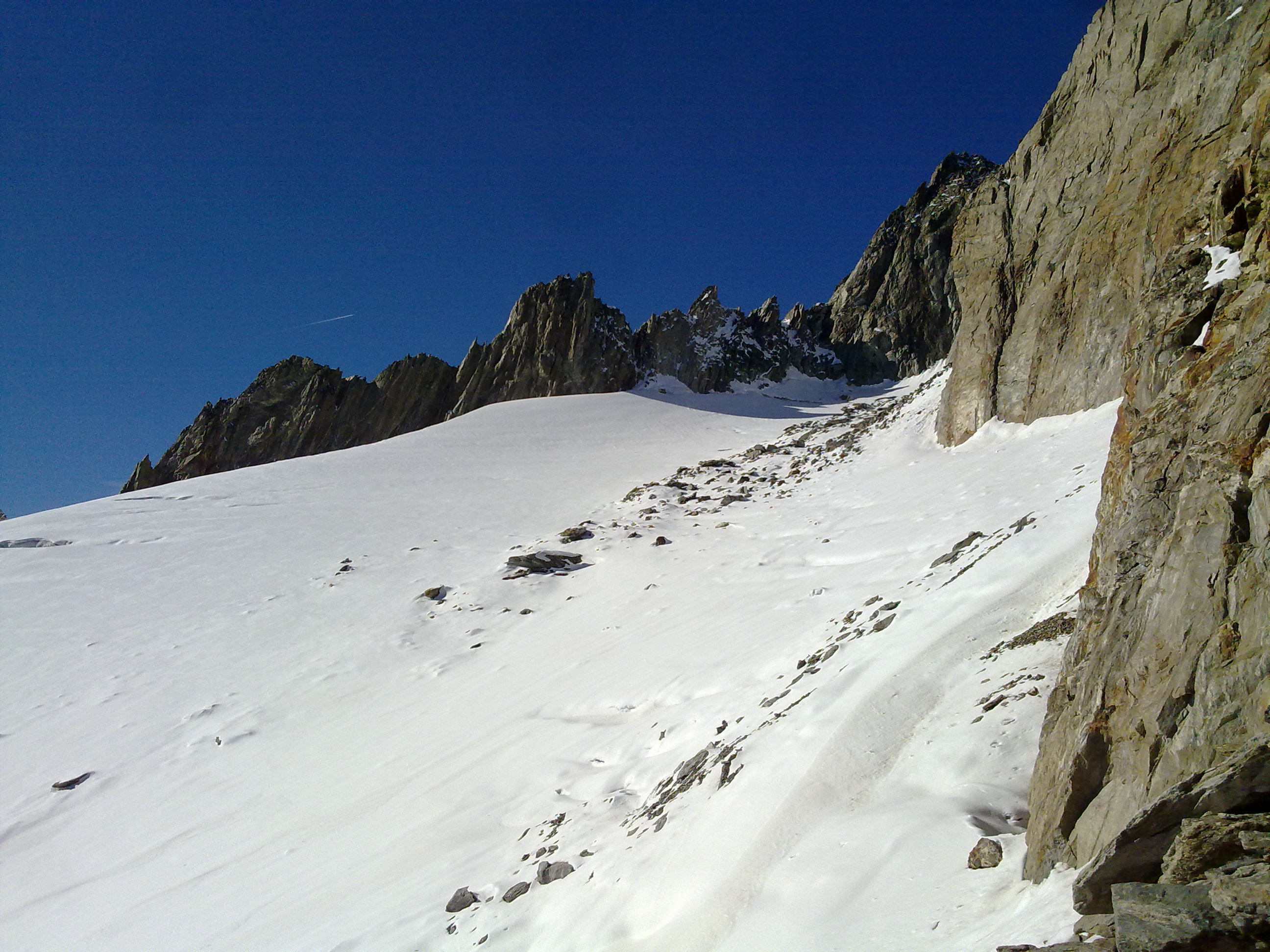
- View from the Unnerbächgletscher

Highest point
- Elevation: 3,620 m (11,880 ft)
- Prominence: 82 m (269 ft)
- Coordinates: 46°24′22″N 7°56′18″E

Geography
- Location within Switzerland
- Location: Valais, Switzerland
- Parent range: Bernese Alps

The Unterbächhorn is located in the Bernese Alps, southeast of the Nesthorn. The higher Northwest-Peak of the Unterbächhorn (3,620 m) lies on the ridge towards Nesthorn. The Southeast-Peak (3,554 m) is the highest summit overlooking Belalp in the canton of Valais.

At its south-eastern flanks lies a glacier named Unnerbächgletscher.
