= Les Bans =

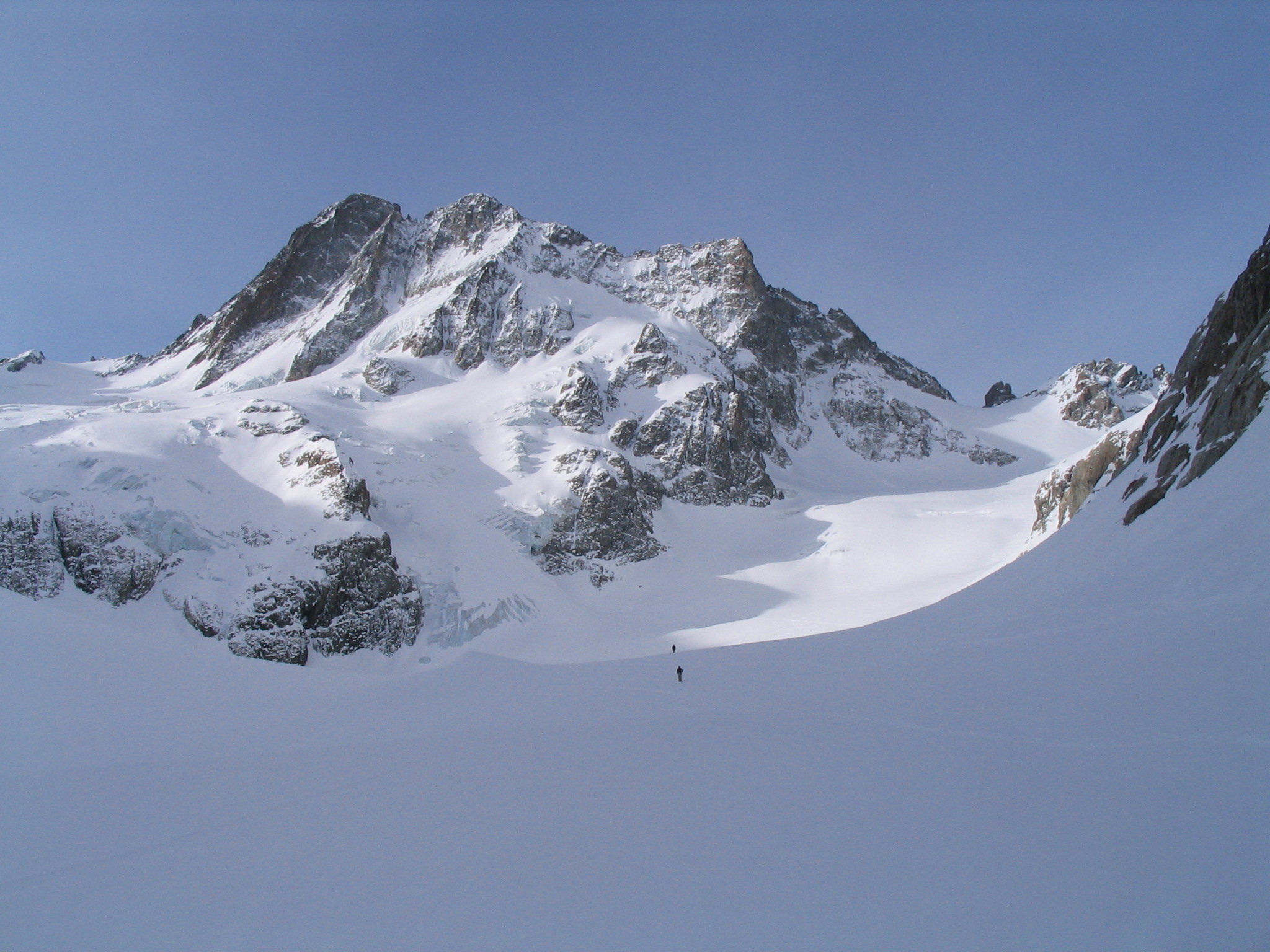
- North face of Les Bans at the head of the Vénéon valley

Highest point
- Elevation: 3,669 m (12,037 ft)
- Prominence: 362 m (1,188 ft)
- Listing: Alpine mountains above 3000 m
- Coordinates: 44°50′54″N 6°20′10″E

Geography
- Location within France
- Location: Hautes-Alpes/Isère, France
- Parent range: Dauphiné Alps

Climbing
- First ascent: July 14, 1878 by W. A. B. Coolidge, Christian Almer and U. Almer
- Easiest route: PD+ (glacier approach, rock scramble)

Les Bans (3,669 m) is a mountain in the Massif des Écrins in the Dauphiné Alps, first climbed by W. A. B. Coolidge, Christian Almer and U. Almer on July 14, 1878.

There are three main summits on the mountain:

- South summit 3,669 m
- North-west summit 3,630 m
- North summit 3,662 m

== Huts ==
- Chalet Hôtel du Gioberney (1,700 m)
- Les Bans hut (2,076 m)
- Pilatte refuge (2,580 m)

== Gallery ==
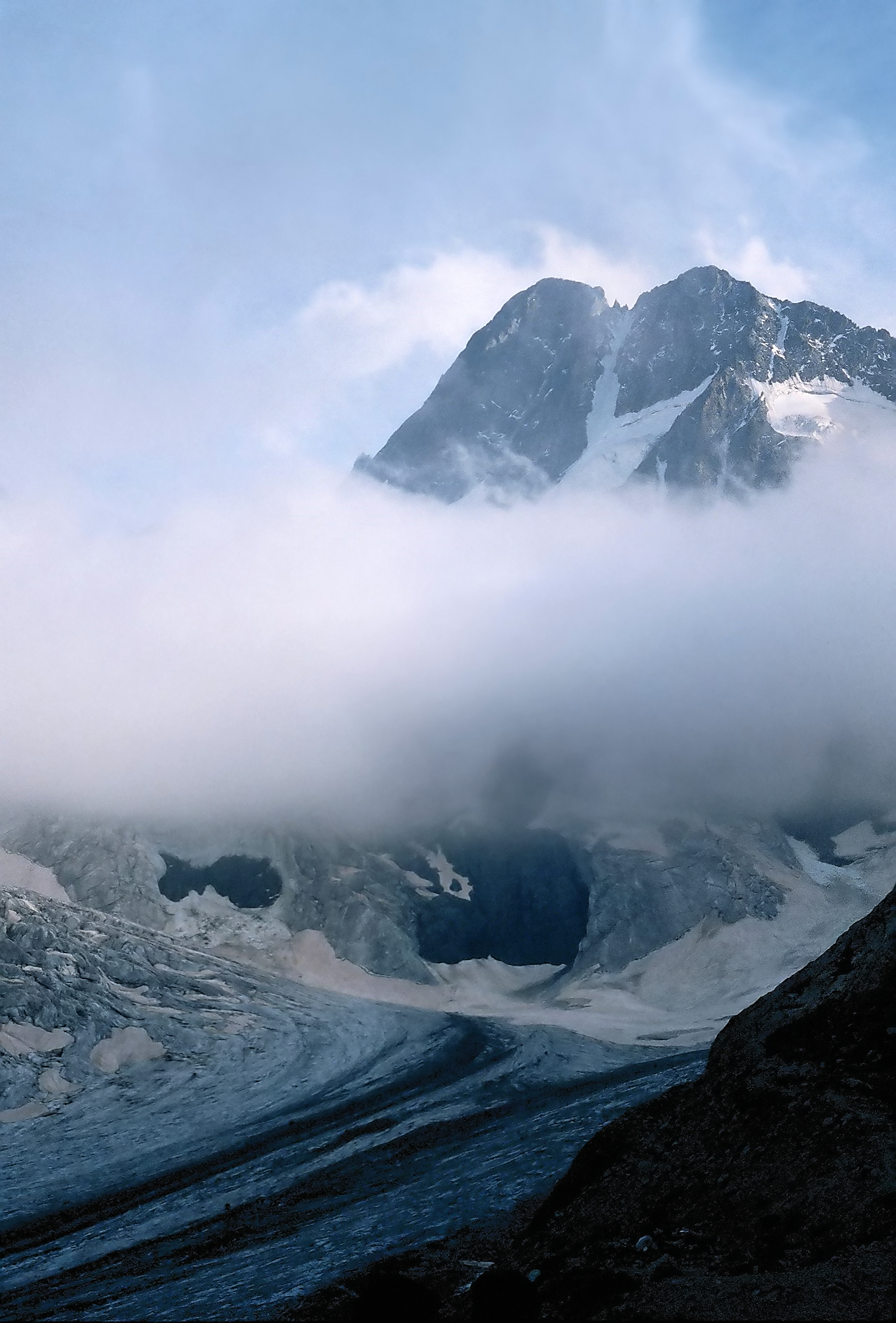
North face, from the Pilatte hut

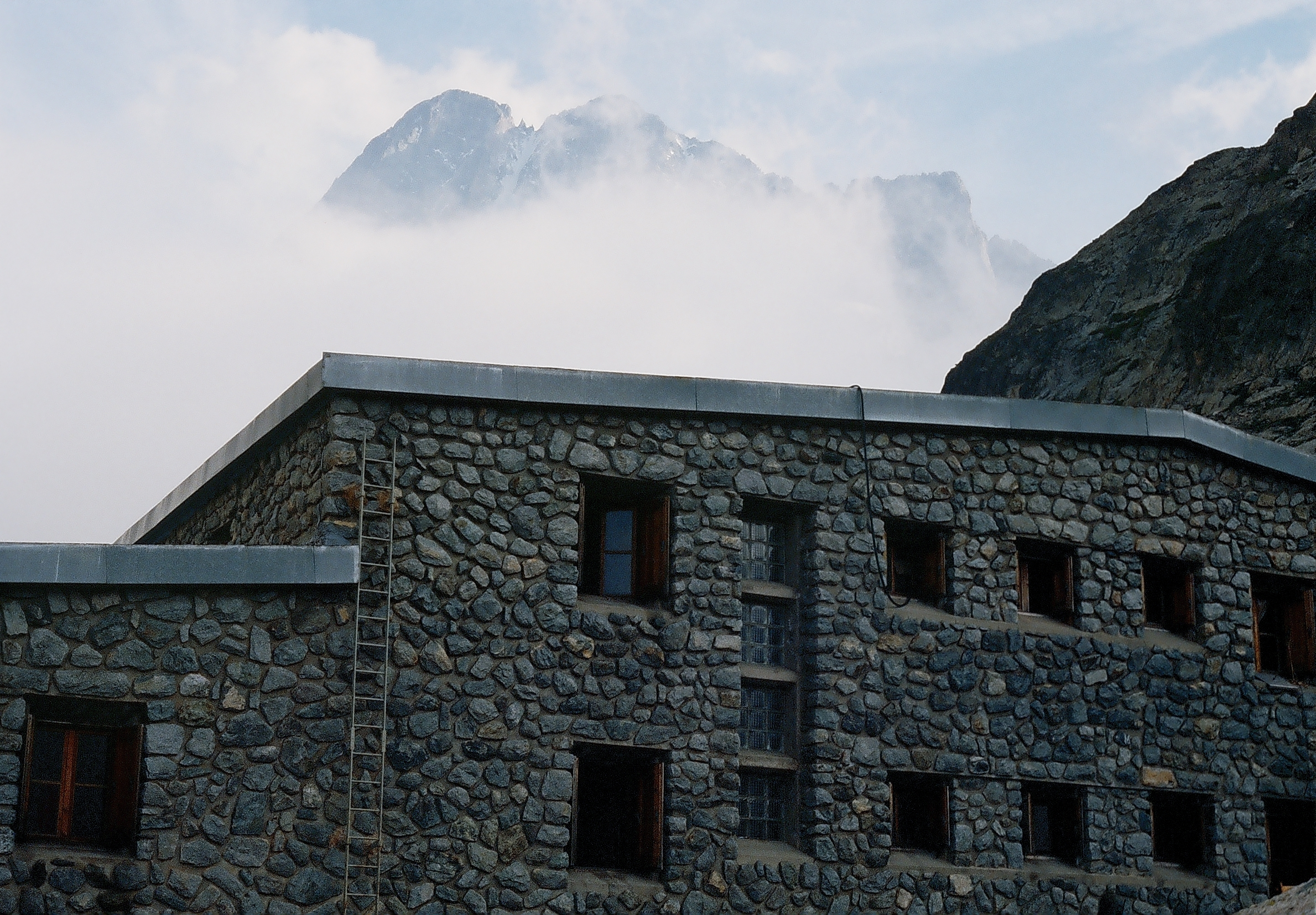
Pilatte hut, with the mountain in the background
