= Arves Massif =

Mountain range in the French Alps

Arvas Massif
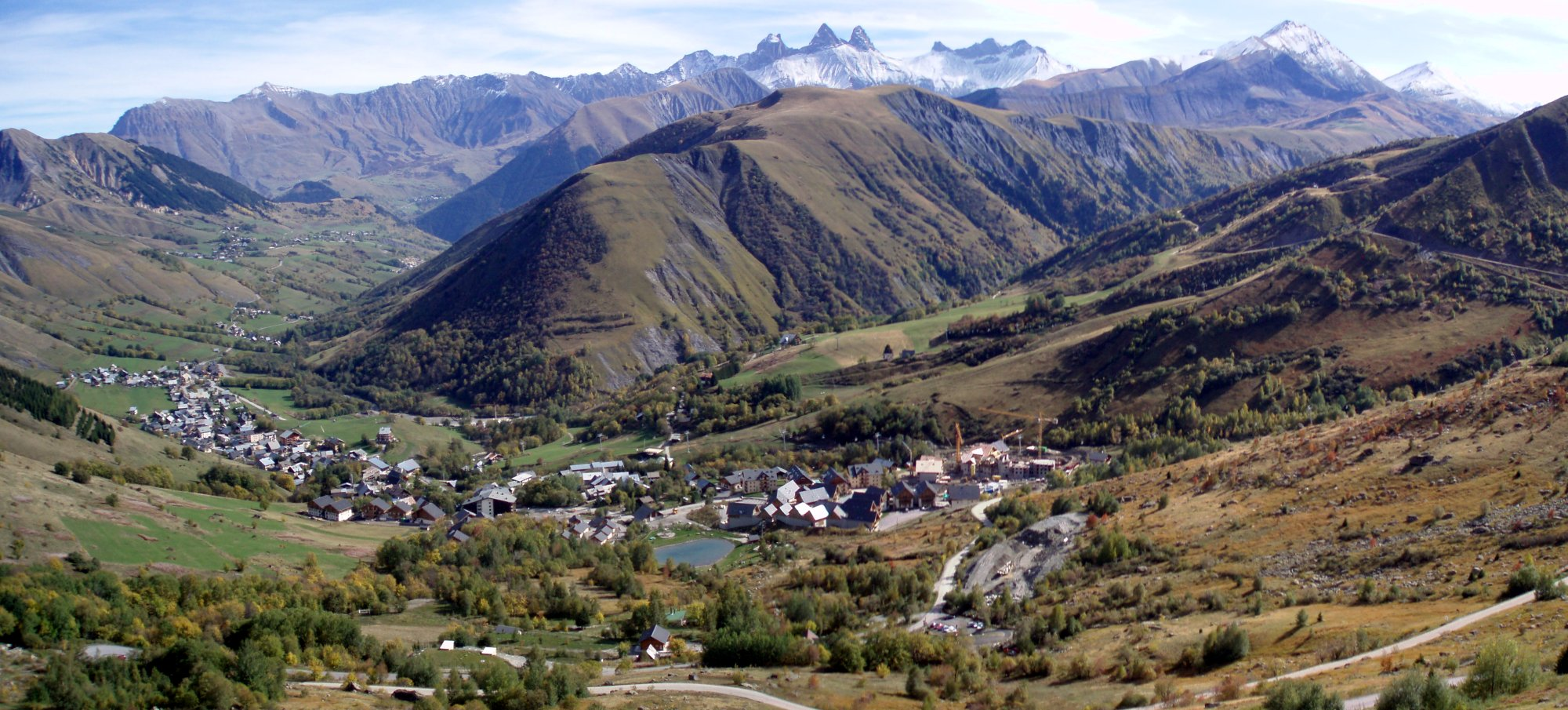
- The resort of Saint-Sorlin-d'Arves with the Aiguilles d'Arves in the background

Highest point
- Elevation: 3,514 m (11,529 ft)
- Parent peak: Aiguilles d'Arves
- Coordinates: 45°07′27″N 6°19′59″E

Naming
- Native name: Massif des Arves (French)

Geography
- Location within France Location within Provence-Alpes-Côte d'Azur
- Country: France
- Departments: Savoie; Isère; Hautes-Alpes
- Regions: Auvergne-Rhône-Alpes; Provence-Alpes-Côte d’Azur
- Parent range: French Alps

The Arves Massif (French: Massif des Arves, pronounced [masif dez‿aʁv]) are a massif in the French Alps located in the departments of Savoie, Isère and Hautes-Alpes. Oisans covers part of the massif.

== Geography ==
=== Location ===
Although often considered part of the Grandes Rousses massif, it is distinguished from it by the valley formed by the Arvan and Ferrand rivers to the west. To the south, separated by the Romanche river, lies the Écrins massif, to the east the Cerces massif, to the northeast the Arc valley (Maurienne) and the Vanoise Massif, and finally to the northwest the Belledonne range.

The massif is deeply incised by the Arvan River at the level of the commune of Albiez-Montrond, which flows from south to north, emptying into the Arc river at Saint-Jean-de-Maurienne.

=== Main summits ===
- Aiguilles d'Arves, 3,514 m (11,529 ft)
- Goléon, 3,427 m (11,243 ft)
- Aiguilles de la Saussaz, 3,361 m (11,027 ft)
- Bec de Grenier, 3,298 m (10,820 ft)
- Aiguille d'Argentière, 3,237 m (10,620 ft)
- Aiguille de l'Épaisseur, 3,230 m (10,600 ft)
- Pointe Salvador, 3,202 m (10,505 ft)
- Pic des Trois Évêchés, 3,116 m (10,223 ft)
- Pointe des Lauzettes, 3,053 m (10,016 ft)
- Pointe de Pierre Fendue, 3,037 m (9,964 ft)
- Pic du Mas de la Grave, 3,020 m (9,910 ft)
- Cime des Torches, 2,958 m (9,705 ft)
- Pic Blanc du Galibier, 2,955 m (9,695 ft)
- Pics de la Buffe d'en Haut, 2,933 m (9,623 ft)
- Grande Chible, 2,931 m (9,616 ft)
- Gros Grenier, 2,911 m (9,551 ft)
- Roche du Bonhomme, 2,891 m (9,485 ft)
- Mont Pellard, 2,882 m (9,455 ft)
- Cime de la Recoude (or Redoute), 2,882 m (9,455 ft)
- Tête des Travers, 2,869 m (9,413 ft)
- Pointe des Ratissières, 2,865 m (9,400 ft)
- Petit Galibier Ouest, 2,826 m (9,272 ft)
- Tête des Masses, 2,812 m (9,226 ft)
- Pointe d'Émy, 2,797 m (9,177 ft)
- Petit Agnelin, 2,717 m (8,914 ft)
- Crey Rond, 2,667 m (8,750 ft)
- Mont Falcon, 2,625 m (8,612 ft)
- Gros Têt ou cime du Rachas, 2,613 m (8,573 ft)
- Pointe des Chaudannes, 2,519 m (8,264 ft)
- Tête d'Albiez le Vieux, 2,470 m (8,100 ft)
- Casse Massion, 2,433 m (7,982 ft)
- Ouillon, 2,431 m (7,976 ft)
- Haute Paré, 2,373 m (7,785 ft)
- Pierre du Turc, 2,305 m (7,562 ft)
- Pointe du Corbier, 2,265 m (7,431 ft)
- Tête Bellard, 2,225 m (7,300 ft)
- Grand Truc, 2,209 m (7,247 ft)
- Mont Charvin, 2,207 m (7,241 ft)
- Pointe du Châtel, 2,202 m (7,224 ft)
