= Nesthorn =

Mountain in Switzerland

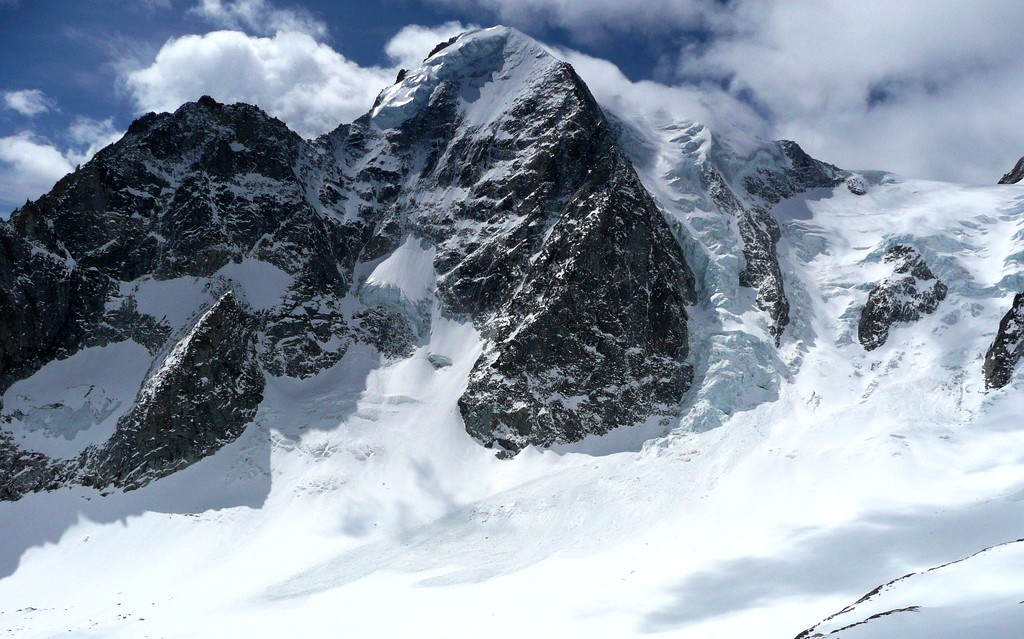
- North side

Highest point
- Elevation: 3,820 m (12,530 ft)
- Prominence: 658 m (2,159 ft)
- Parent peak: Bietschhorn
- Listing: Alpine mountains above 3000 m
- Coordinates: 46°24′48″N 7°55′33″E

Geography
- Location within Switzerland
- Location: Valais, Switzerland
- Parent range: Bernese Alps

Climbing
- First ascent: In 1865 by B. George and H. Mortimer with guides Ulrich and Christian Almer

The Nesthorn is a mountain in the Bernese Alps. It is located in the Swiss canton of Valais north of Brig. The mountain lies between the Oberaletsch Glacier on the north and east side and the Gredetschtal on the south side. It is part of the subrange of the Bernese Alps that culminates at the Aletschhorn.

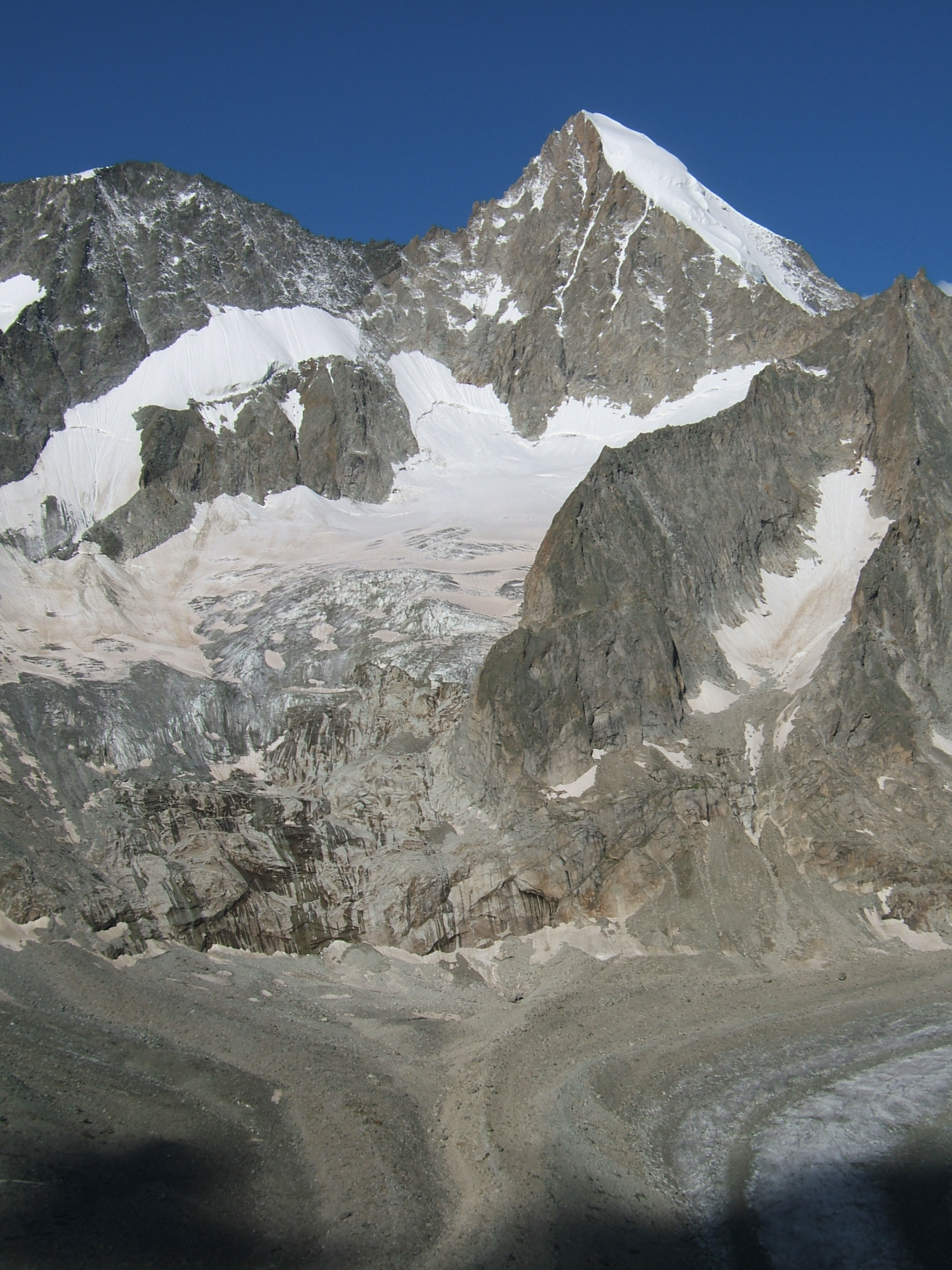
East side of Nesthorn

The Nesthorn was first ascended from Belalp in 1865 by B. George and H. Mortimer, with Christian Almer and his son. Passing the base of the peak nearly to the head of the west branch of the Beich Firn (tributary of the Oberaletsch Glacier), they had on their left a steep iceslope, broken in five places by protruding masses of rock. Ascending the steep channel between the two masses nearest the Nesthorn they reached the ridge overlooking the Gredetschtal, turned to the left, and crossing a minor peak, and attained the summit in 6 hours, exclusive of halts.

== See also ==
- List of mountains of Switzerland
