= Meta Brevoort =

American mountain climber (1825–1876)

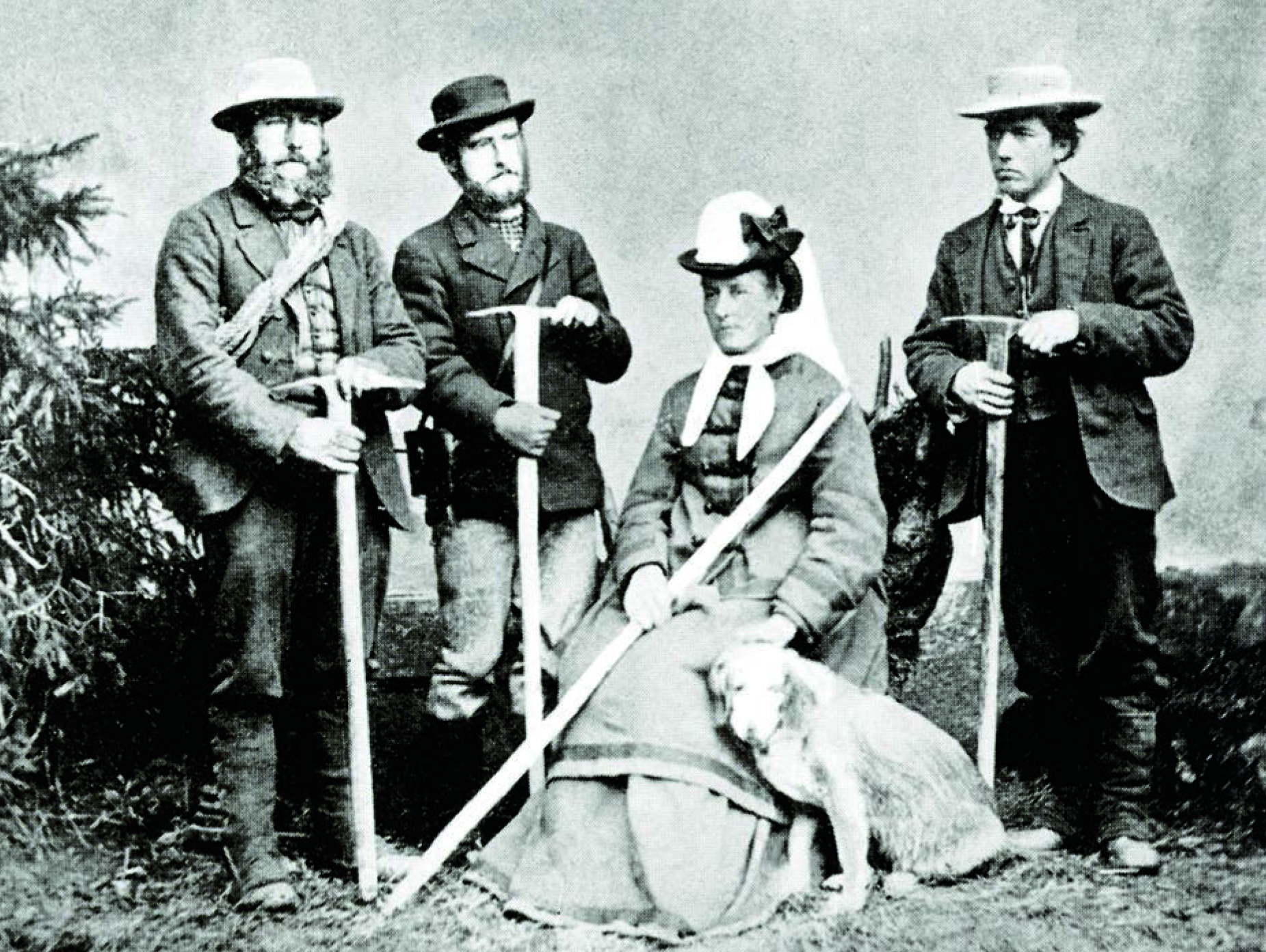
Meta Brevoort with the guides Christian Almer and his son Ulrich Almer to her left, and her nephew W. A. B. Coolidge to her right, c. 1874

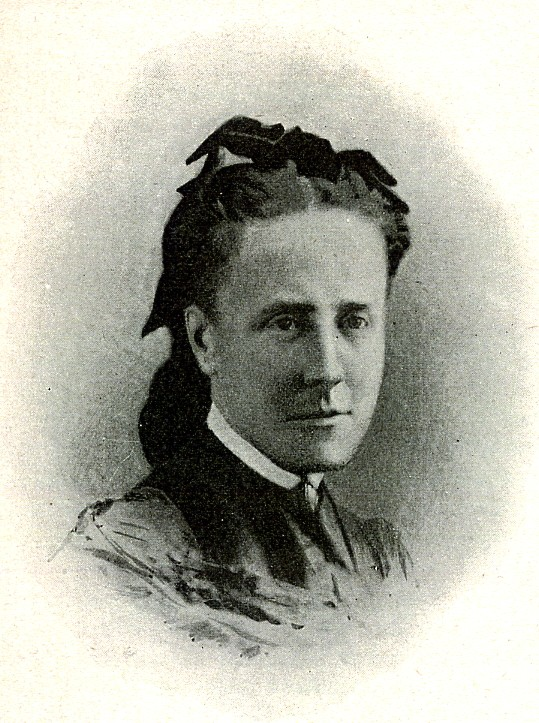
Meta Brevoort

Marguerite "Meta" Claudia Brevoort (November 8, 1825 – December 19, 1876) was an American mountain climber and pioneer in alpine history, known for her many first ascents and as a trailblazer in winter mountaineering.

In the Haut Dauphiné region, the highest peak of the Grande Ruine, the 3,765-meter-high Pointe Brevoort, was named after her.

== Early life ==
Brevoort was born on November 8, 1825, into New York high society and spent her early years at Couvent Sacré Coeur, a Paris convent school. During the summers, she accompanied her family to Switzerland, where she grew familiar with the Alps. It wasn’t until age 39 that she took up climbing.

After the death of her parents, Meta Brevoort returned to New York in 1848 and moved in with her sister. During this time, she volunteered at a hospital and helped care for her sister's children, particularly her nephew, William Augustus Brevoort Coolidge, with whom she would share a lifelong bond. After a doctor recommended mountain air for the sick boy, Brevoort traveled with William to the Bernese Oberland and Zermatt in 1865 and stayed.

== Mountaineering career ==
She was the one who introduced Coolidge to alpine mountaineering, a passion he would pursue with great success, eventually completing over 1,700 climbs in the Alps and becoming the most prominent alpine historian of the Victorian era. For more than a decade, Brevoort and Coolidge climbed together, usually accompanied by the Grindelwald mountain guide Christian Almer, and a lot of times, also by Almer’s son, Ulrich Almer.

She made a number of important ascents in the Alps in the 1860s and 1870s. She was the first human to climb Pic Central de la Meije (3973 m) in 1870. The same year she also made the first ascent on Eiger (3967 m) by the SouthEast ridge. First ascent by a woman on Silberhorn (3689 m) and the first winter ascent ever of Jungfrau (4158 m). She also was the first woman to traverse Matterhorn (4478 m) and did the first ascent by a woman of the Weisshorn (4506 m), Dent Blanche (4357 m) and Bietschhorn (3934 m).

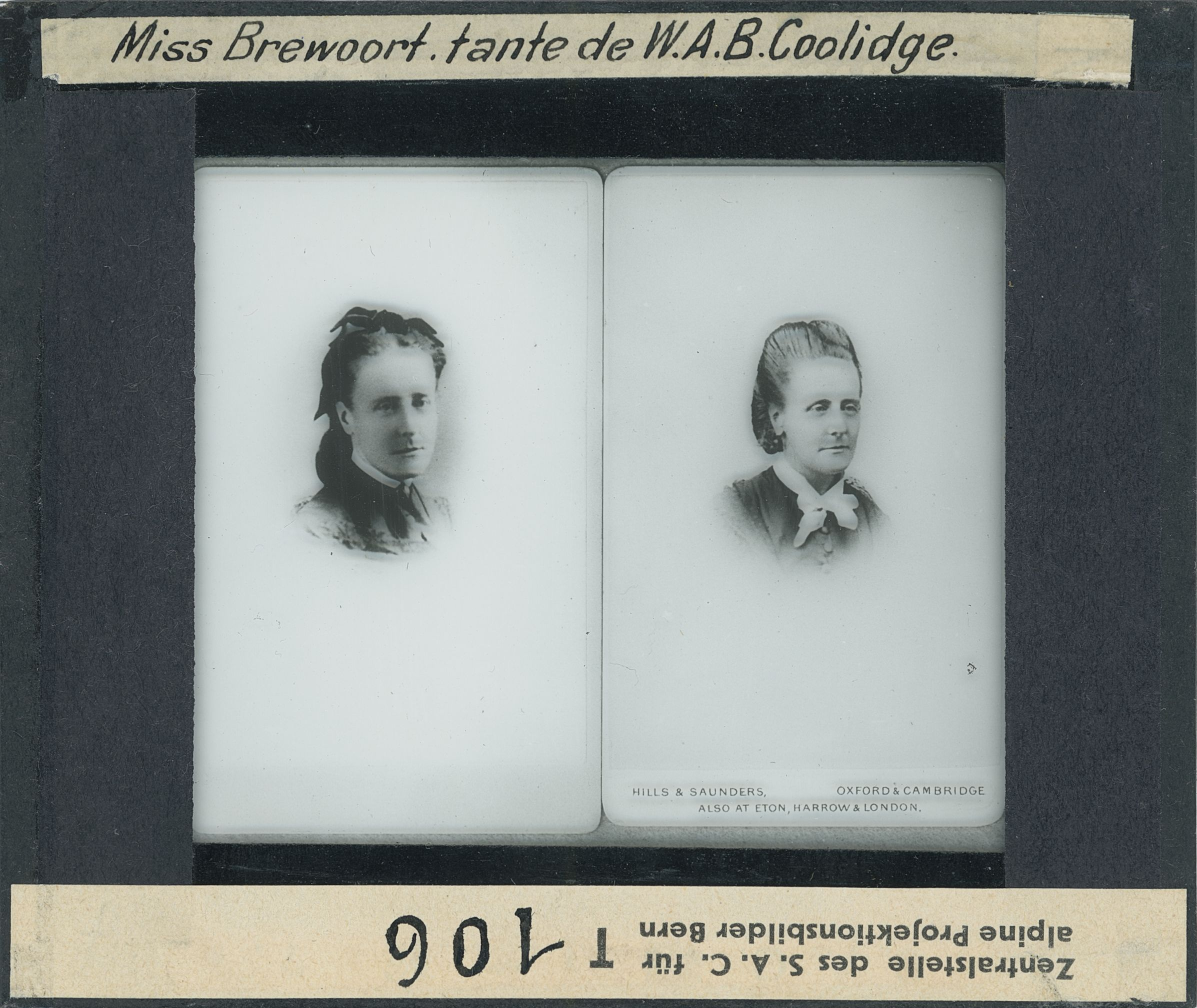
Meta Brevoort

== Dog Tschingel ==
After a failed attempt to climb Eiger, Christian Almer gifted Coolidge a dog named Tschingel (1865–1879) as a consolation. Tschingel became the most famous dog in alpine history, joining Meta, Coolidge, and the Almers on several major first ascents. Including being the first dog on the highest peak in the alps, the 4,808-meter high Mont Blanc. An event that was celebrated with cannon salute by the citizen and mountain guides of Chamonix.

In 1869, while descending from Monte Rosa, Meta Brevoort’s climbing party encountered representatives of the Alpine Club near Riffelberg. They were so enthusiastic about Tschingel that they elected her an honorary member on the spot “by acclamation”. Brevoort later described Tschingel as the only female member of the Alpine Club — an honour that was denied to Brevoort, one of the most famous female alpinists of her time, because the Alpine Club only accepted men until 1974.

== The Matterhorn ==
History has often remembered Meta, focusing on what were perceived as her greatest failures. Meta Brevoort’s two greatest alpine ambitions were to become the first woman to summit the Matterhorn and the first person to conquer the Meije in the Dauphiné.

Her role model and rival was Lucy Walker, who began her considerable mountaineering career at the age of 28, in 1859. In 1871, hearing that Brevoort planned an expedition to the Matterhorn, Walker quickly assembled a party that included the famous guide Melchior Anderegg and made the summit a few days before Brevoort arrived in Zermatt. Although Meta Brevoort missed out on her dream to be the first woman to climb the Matterhorn, she was not deterred. She waited for the right conditions on the mountain, and a few days after Walker's summit, she became the first woman to traverse the Matterhorn from Zermatt to Breuil-Cervinia.

== La Meije ==
Her second dream, to conquer La Meije, was even more daring. Edward Whymper, the man who had conquered the Matterhorn, had visited La Grave and declared La Meije unclimbable. La Meije was one of the last great alpine peaks to be climbed, and it remains a technically challenging climb to this day. Meta attempted the climb in 1870.

La Meije is composed of two main summits: an eastern summit and a western summit. The western summit, known as the Grand Pic de la Meije (or Pic Occidental), stands at 3,983 meters, while the eastern summit, known as Pic Central or Doigt de Dieu, reaches 3,970 meters, just slightly lower. From the valley, it’s difficult to discern which summit is higher. When Meta Brevoort and her team attempted to climb La Meije, they chose to ascend Pic Central, reaching it on June 28, 1870. However, upon arrival, they realized that the Grand Pic was the true summit. A knife-edged ridge separated their high point from the main summit—a ridge that, with the equipment of the time, was insurmountable and would remain unclimbed for many years. Although Meta did not reach the highest point of La Meije, she was the first to establish a route to Pic Central, an impressive achievement in itself.

She and Coolidge journeyed to the Dauphiné several times in order to attempt the Meije but encountered bad weather each trip. In 1876, she had her final opportunity for a first ascent, but, instead, stayed in the Oberland in order to give more money to her nephew, to support his efforts in the range.

Brevoort was the first female mountaineer to wear trousers, in contrast to Walker, who always wore dresses.

== Death ==
A few months later, on December 19, 1876, she died at her home in Dorking, England, where she lived with her niece. Her death was caused by rheumatic fever, resulting from a streptococcal infection. Her body was taken to Oxford, where she was buried in a grave in St Sepulchre's Cemetery, next to the grave of her sister, Mrs Coolidge.

== A list of Meta Brevoort's climbs ==
- 1865 Strahlegg 3482 m, Cima di Jazzi 3803 m, Theodul Pass 3295 m, Col du Géant 3356 m, Mount Blanc 4807 m, Niesen 2362 m
- 1866 Mont Buet 3096 m, Col d'Argentière 3552 m, Col du Sonadon 3503 m, Col d'Oren 3261 m, Col de Valpelline 3557 m
- 1867 Tschingel Pass 2787 m, Haute Route from Chamonix to Zermatt, Beichgrat 3294 m
- 1868 Wetterhorn 3690 m, Blümlisalphorn 3661 m, Balmhorn 3698 m, Zagenjoch 3042 m, Nesthorn 3821 m - 1. ascent by a woman, Mönchjoch 3650 m, Sparrhorn 3021 m
- 1869 Dômes de Miage 3673 m, Col de la Bérangère 3348 m - 1. traverse, Col du Mont Tondu 3105 m, Grandes Jorasses 4208 m - 1. ascent by a woman, Grand Combin 4314 m, Col du Moine 3418 m - 1. ascent, Monte Rosa 4634 m
- 1870 Col des Aiguilles d'Arves 3163 m, Pic Central de la Meije 3973 m - 1. ascent, Diablerets 3246 m, Brunegghorn 3833 m, Dom 4546 m
- 1871 Eigerjoch 3605 m, Mättenberg 3104 m, Eiger 3967 m - 1. ascent by SE ridge, Silberhorn 3689 m - 1. ascent by a woman, Jungfrau 4158 m - 1. winter ascent, Alphubeljoch 3772 m, Triftjoch 3540 m, Fusshorn 3701 m - 1. ascent, Matterhorn 4478 m - 1. traverse by a woman, Weisshorn 4506 m - 1. ascent by a woman, Dent Blanche 4357 m - 1. ascent by a woman, Bietschhorn 3934 m - 1. ascent by a woman
- 1872 Brèche de la Meije 3357 m - 1. ascent by a woman, Col de la Temple 3301 m, Aletschhorn 4194 m, Strahlegg 3482 m, Schreckhorn 4078 m, Mönch 4110 m, Jungfraujoch 3463 m, Unterbächhorn 3554 m - 1. ascent, Finsteraarhorn 4273 m, Agassizjoch 3747 m, Finsteraarjoch 3283 m, Wetterhorn 3690 m, Mittelhorn 3702 m, Gspaltenhorn 3426 m - 1. ascent by a woman, Doldenhorn 3638 m - 1. ascent by a woman, Gisighorn 3177 m - 1. ascent and guideless
- 1873 Aiguilles d'Arves Northern Needle 3358 m - 1. ascent, Col de la Loze 2304 m, Le Râteau 3809 m - 1. ascent from SE, Col des Écrins 3367 m - 1. traverse by a woman, Col du Glacier Blanc 3275 m - 1. traverse by a woman, Grande Ruine, Pointe Brevoort 3765 m - 1. ascent, Col de la Casse Déserte 3483 m - 1. traverse, Col de la Pilatte 3476 m- 1. traverse by a woman
- 1874 Wetterhom 3690 m - 1. winter ascent, Jungfrau 4158 m - 1. winter ascent, Mönchjoch 3650 m - 1. winter traverse, Col du Tour 3287 m, Mont Thuria 3646 m, Col des Aiguilles d'Arves 3163m, Fiescherjoch 3691 m - 1. traverse by a woman, Ochs 3895 m - 1. ascent
- 1875 Mont Blanc 4807 m (1. ascent of a dog, Tschingel), Kleines Schreckhorn 3494 m (1. ascent from southeast), Brèche de Valsenestre 2,598 m, Col du Vallon de Lanchâtra 3100 m (1. ascent and 1. traverse), Pointe Marguerite 4066m (1. ascent), Les Berches 3050 m, Col des Chamois 3200 m (1. traverse), Aiguille de Blaitière 3522 m, Aiguille Verte 4122 m
- 1876 Gross Fusshorn 3627 m (1. ascent and last climb of Meta and Tschingel)
