= Pic Bayle =

Mountain in France

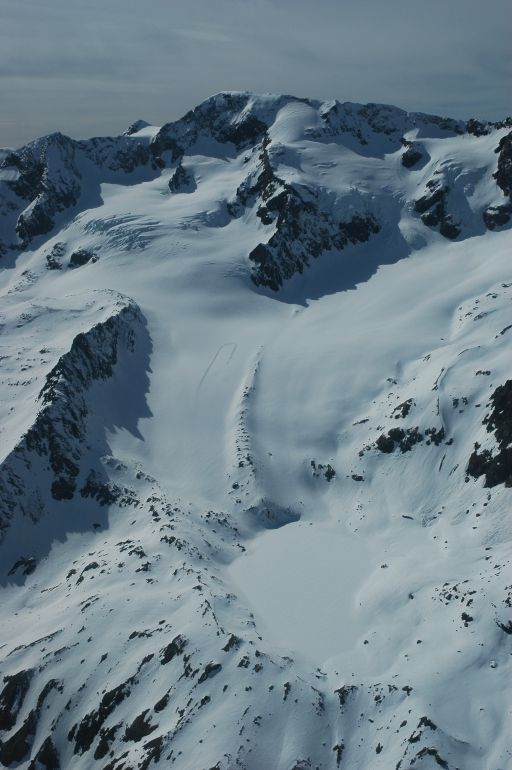
- Pic Bayle

Highest point
- Elevation: 3,465 m (11,368 ft)
- Prominence: 1,175 m (3,855 ft)
- Listing: Alpine mountains above 3000 m
- Coordinates: 45°08′17″N 6°08′09″E

Geography
- Location within Alps
- Location: Rhône-Alpes, France
- Parent range: Dauphiné Alps

Climbing
- First ascent: 1874 by Joseph Bayle

Pic Bayle is a summit in the Dauphiné Alps, culminating at a height of 3,465 m (11,368 ft), the highest point of the Massif des Grandes Rousses. It is above the resort of Alpe d'Huez.
