= Aiguille de Blaitière =

Mountain in France

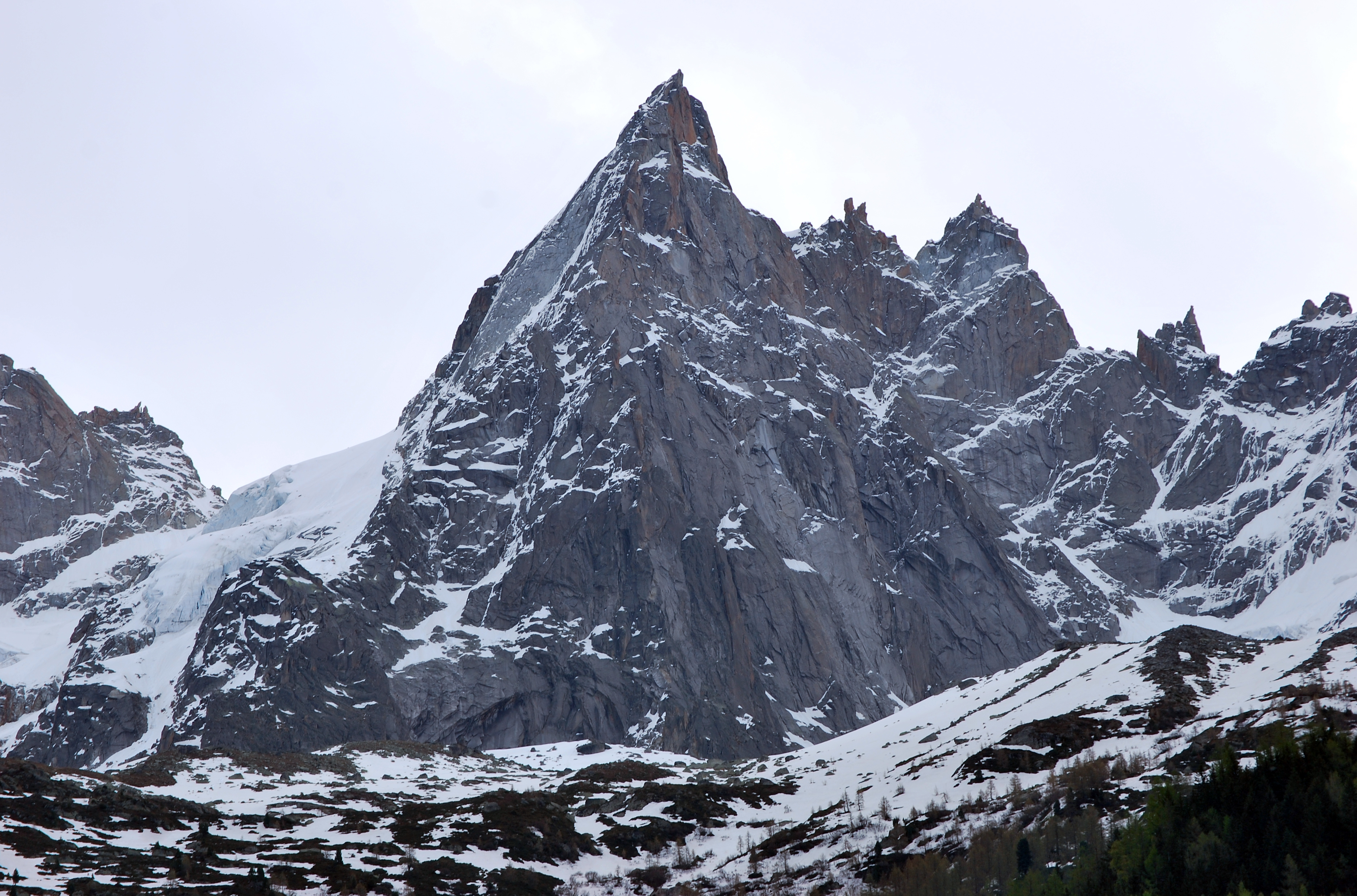

Highest point
- Elevation: 3,522 m (11,555 ft)
- Prominence: 149 m (489 ft)
- Coordinates: 45°53′57″N 06°54′47″E

Geography
- Location within France
- Location: Haute-Savoie, France
- Parent range: Mont Blanc Massif

Climbing
- First ascent: 6 August 1874 by E.R. Whitwell with C. and J. Lauener

The Aiguille de Blaitière (3,522 m) is a mountain in the Mont Blanc Massif in Haute-Savoie, France. The peak was first reached in 1874 by English mountaineers.

The mountain was used in the early 1900s as a base for the ascent of Mount Blanc itself.
