= Oberaletsch Glacier =

Glacier in Switzerland

- Oberaletschgletscher
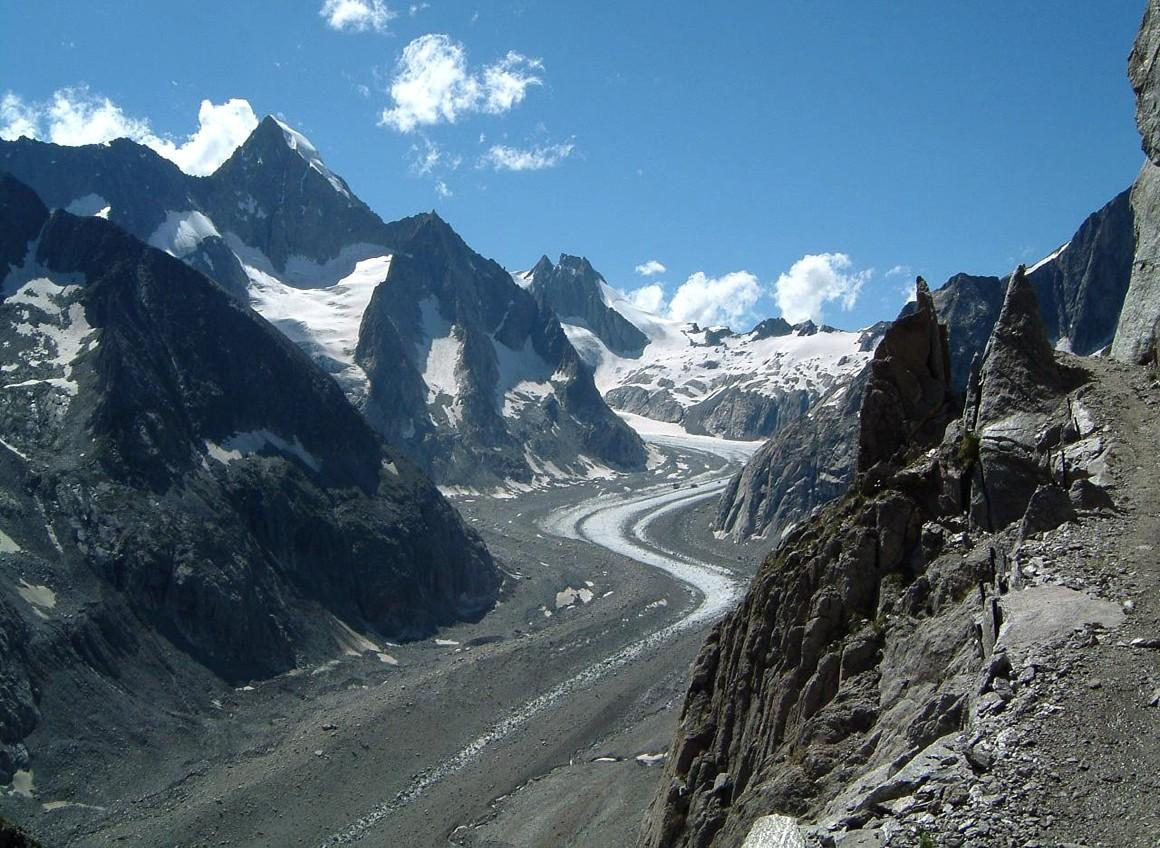
- Oberaletschgletscher and Nesthorn (left side)

- Location within Switzerland Location within Alps
- Interactive map of Oberaletsch Glacier
- Location: Valais, Switzerland
- Coordinates: 46°25′8″N 7°57′27″E
- Length: 9 km (5.6 mi)

The Oberaletsch Glacier (German: Oberaletschgletscher, meaning Upper Aletsch Glacier) is a valley glacier on the south side of the Bernese Alps, in the canton of Valais. It had a length of 9 km (5.6 mi) with an average width of just under 1 km (0.62 mi) and an area of about 22 km^{2} (8.5 sq mi) in 1973.

The Oberaletsch Glacier system consists of two approximately equal arms. The eastern one takes its starting point on the south western flank of the Aletschhorn at around 3,700 m (12,100 ft), and joins the western arm (Beichgletscher) in the valley at the foot of the Nesthorn. Then the glacier flows to the south-east towards the Aletsch Glacier without reaching it. The glacier tongue ends at around 2,150 m (7,050 ft). During the Little Ice Age in the middle of the 19th century the glacier was part of the Aletsch Glacier.

The Swiss Alpine Club Oberaletschhütte (2,640 m (8,660 ft)) is above the junction of the two glacier arms and has been accessible to hikers since 2005 with a new trail from Belalp.

== History ==
In December 2001, the area of the Oberaletsch Glacier, along with the Aletsch Glacier, was declared a UNESCO World Heritage Site.

== See also ==
- List of glaciers in Switzerland
- List of glaciers
- Retreat of glaciers since 1850
- Swiss Alps
