= Christian Almer =

Swiss mountain climber (1826–1898)

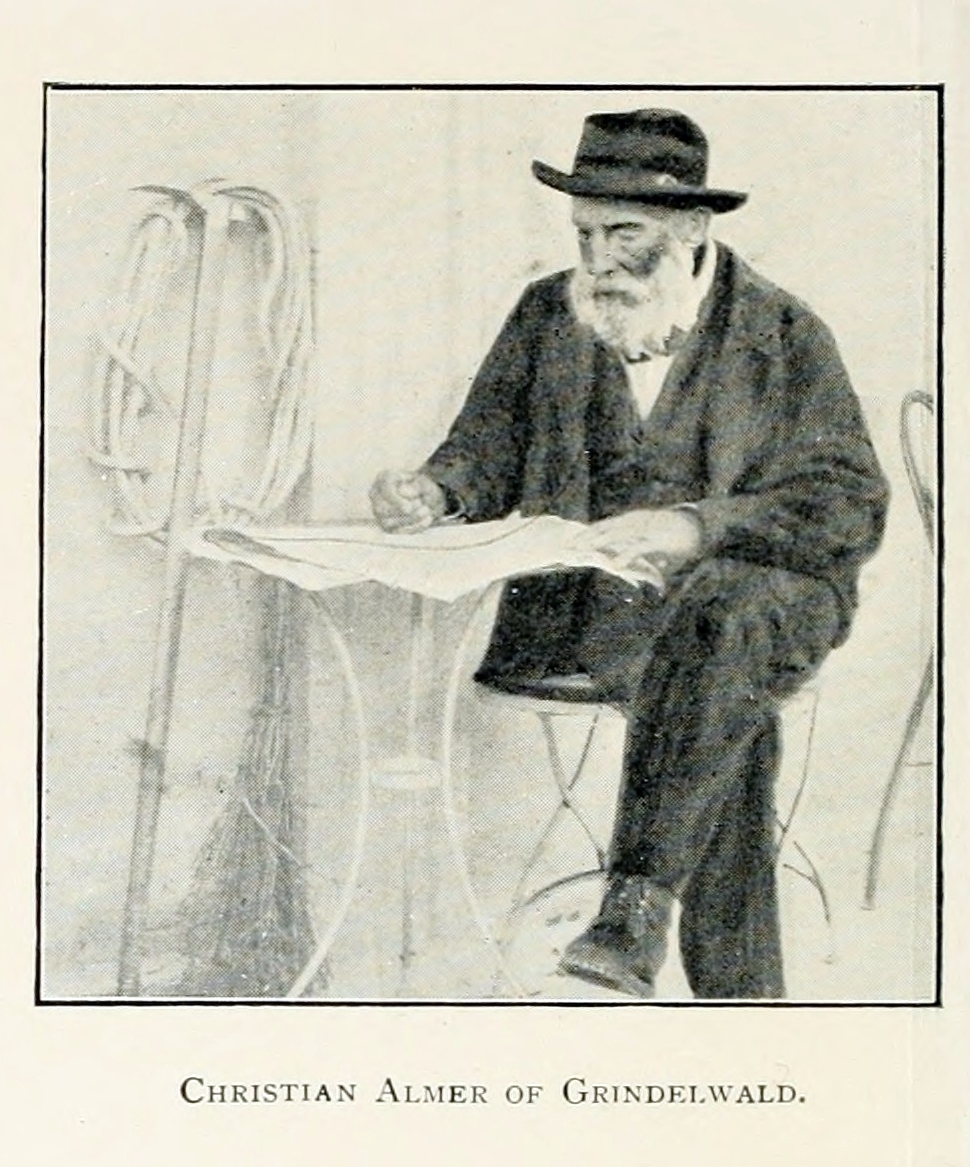
Christian Almer

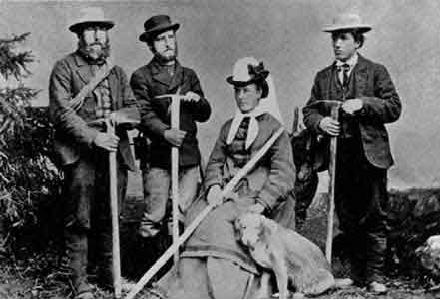
Christian and Ulrich Almer, Meta Brevoort and her nephew W. A. B. Coolidge

Christian Almer (29 March 1826 – 17 May 1898) was a Swiss mountain guide and the first ascensionist of many prominent mountains in the western Alps during the golden and silver ages of alpinism. Almer was born and died in Grindelwald, Canton of Bern.

== Life ==
During his lifetime, Christian Almer, like his contemporary Melchior Anderegg from Meiringen, was considered one of the best of the first generation of mountain guides. He guided his clients in the Bernese Alps, the Valais Alps, the Mont Blanc massif and the Dauphiné Alps. With his many first ascents or first winter ascents, he made a name for himself as a first-class alpinist of his time, guiding alpinists including Edward Whymper, W. A. B. Coolidge, Adolphus Warburton Moore, Leslie Stephen, and Gottlieb Samuel Studer.

Christian Almer was married to Margaritha Kaufmann from 1846. His son Ulrich Almer (8 May 1849 - 4 September 1940 in Grindelwald), with whom he went on many mountain trips together, also worked as a mountain guide.

Christian Almer spent the summers of his childhood and youth as a shepherd and goatherd. As early as the 1840s, he accompanied tourists on their first mountain climbs. His first guiding activity was a failed attempt to climb the Jungfrau, which he tried to reach on 13 September 1851 from Grindelwald via the Mönch. In 1854 he climbed all three Wetterhörner within one year. Four years later, he and Charles Barrington with Peter Bohren were the first people to stand on the Eiger summit, which at that time was considered as unclimbable as the Matterhorn in the Canton Valais.

After a winter ascent of the Jungfrau in early 1885, all of Almer's toes on his right foot had to be amputated. Nevertheless, he continued his guiding activities. In 1895, when he was almost 70 years old, he led a party over the Bietschhorn. He celebrated his golden wedding anniversary with his wife, two sons, and a daughter on 22 June 1896 on the Wetterhorn. The following year he ended his alpine career by climbing the Wetterhorn, the summit with which he had so much in common. His strength left him suddenly and quickly. Almer died on 17 May 1898 in Grindelwald.

== Climbing career ==
Almer gave his dog Tschingel to the 17-year-old W. A. B. Coolidge after a failed attempt on the Eiger.

I do not clearly recollect hearing of Tschingel till July 11, 1868. That month Almer had for the first time become guide to my aunt, the late Miss Brevoort, and myself. On July 8 we all three made our first high climb together (the Wetterhorn) and on July 11 started from Little Scheidegg for the ascent of the Eiger. But the rocks (as often) were glazed, and we had to retreat. This disappointed me bitterly, for I was not quite eighteen years of age [...] Almer sympathised much with me, and so, as we were walking down that afternoon to Grindelwald, tried to comfort me by promising to give me his dog Tschingel, as one of her sons, Bello by name, was now able to act as watchdog ...

== Golden wedding anniversary ==
Sheltering before their climb of the Wetterhorn at the Gleckstein hut in 1869. From left to right, front row: Almer’s wife, daughter, son, Christian Almer; back row: Dr. Huber, Almer’s son; Hans Kaufmann (tallest individual), and another porter.

On 20 and 21 June 1896 Almer and his wife Margaritha ("Gritli") celebrated their golden (50th) wedding anniversary by climbing the Wetterhorn:

The oldest of the Grindelwald guides, Christian Almer, well known to Alpine climbers, celebrated his golden wedding on Sunday in a novel way. Christian is seventy-four years of age, and his wife seventy-five. Accompanied by two of their younger sons and by the village doctor, the sturdy old couple made the ascent of the Wetterhorn, 12,150 ft high. Starting at a very early hour on Sunday morning, they reached the Wetterhorn Hut in the evening, their safe arrival there being made known to their fellow villagers by a signal light, which, shone in response to the many rockets fired by the sympathetic villagers below. Here the veteran climbers and their companions passed the night, and starting soon after midnight for the remainder of the ascent, they reached the summit at half-past six on Monday morning. A cloudless sky and magnificent panorama of the Oberland rewarded their courage and endurance. The aged couple returned safely to Grindelwald on Monday evening.

== First ascents ==
- 1857 Mönch (Bernese Alps)
- 1858 Eiger (Bernese Alps)
- 1862 Gross Fiescherhorn (Bernese Alps)
- 1864 Barre des Ecrins (Dauphiné Alps)
- 1865 Aiguille Verte (Mont Blanc Massif)
- 1865 Grand Cornier (Pennine Alps)
- 1865 Pointe Whymper on the Grandes Jorasses (Mont Blanc Massif)
- 1865 Nesthorn (Bernese Alps)
- 1867 Kleines Schreckhorn (Bernese Alps)
- 1870 Ailefroide (Dauphiné Alps)
- 1874 Mont Thuria, (Graian Alps)
- 1876 Les Droites west summit (Mont Blanc Massif)
- 1877 Pic Coolidge (Dauphiné Alps)
- 1878 Aiguille Arves Méridonale (Dauphiné Alps)
- 1878 Aiguille de l'Epaisseur (Dauphiné Alps)
- 1878 Les Bans (Dauphiné Alps)
- 1879 Aiguille de Chambeyron (Cottian Alps)
- 1881 Visolotto (Cottian Alps)
- 1884 Pointe de Soliette (Graian Alps)

== Death and Grave ==
Christian Almer died in Grindelwald on 17 May 1898. His gravestone reads:

Hier ruht der besten Führer einer CHRISTIAN ALMER geb. 29. März 1826. gest. 17. Mai 1898

Galt’s Berge zu bezwingen,
Gab’s keinen bessern Mann;
Wer mit dir stritt und siegte,
Dich nie vergessen kann.
Jetzt darfst du auf den Zinnen
Der ewige Berge stehn.
Wohin dich Christus führte.
Dort Freund auf Wiedersehn
Deine alten treuen Fahrgenossen.

Here rests one of the best guides CHRISTIAN ALMER born 25 March 1826, died 17 May 1898.

Were mountains to be conquered,
There wasn't a better man;
Whoever struggled with you and won,
Can never forget you.
Now you may stand on the summits
Of the eternal mountains.
Where Christ led you.
There friend goodbye.
Your old, loyal companions.
