= Belalp =

Village in Switzerland

Coordinates: 46°22′17″N 7°58′27″E

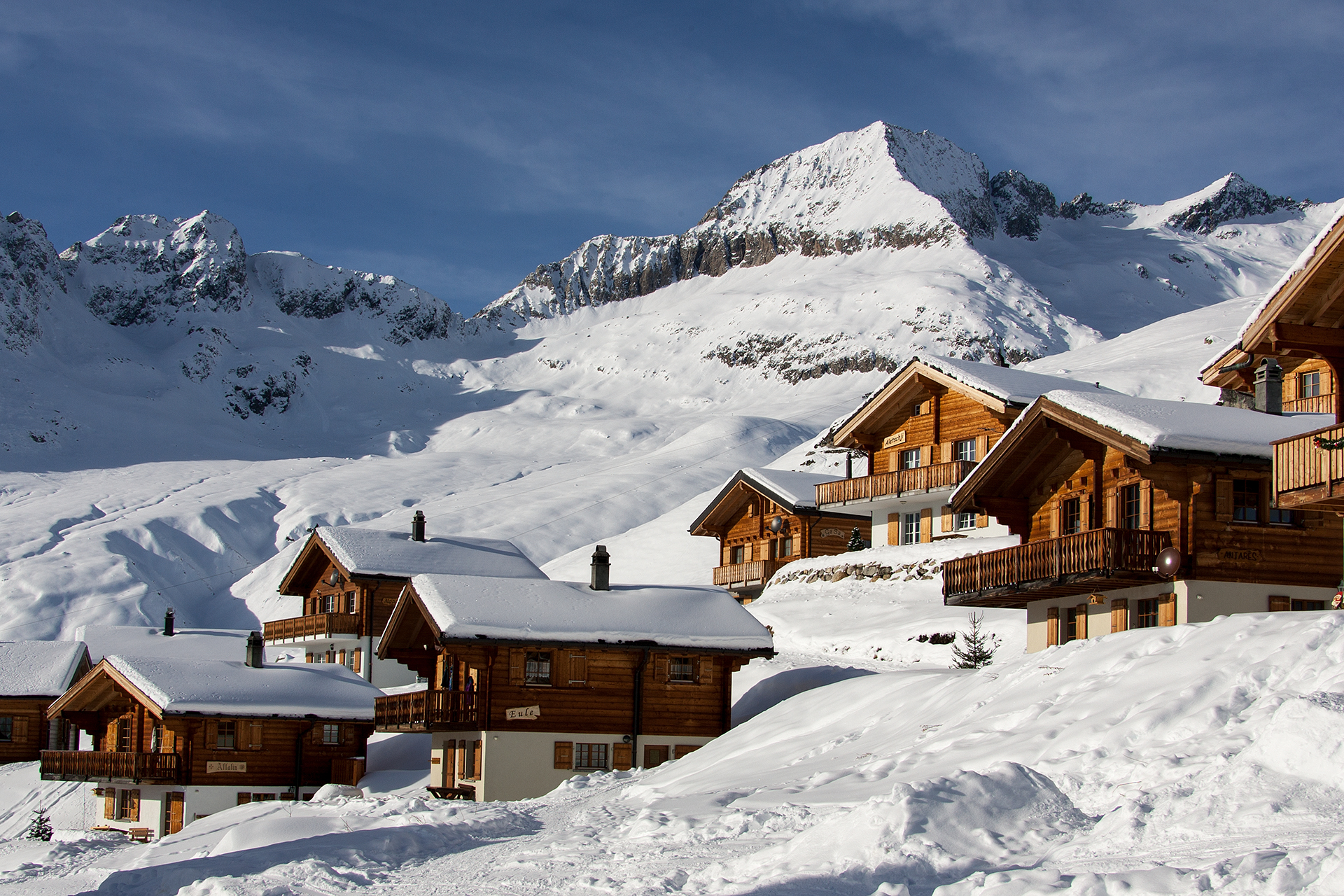
Belalp in winter

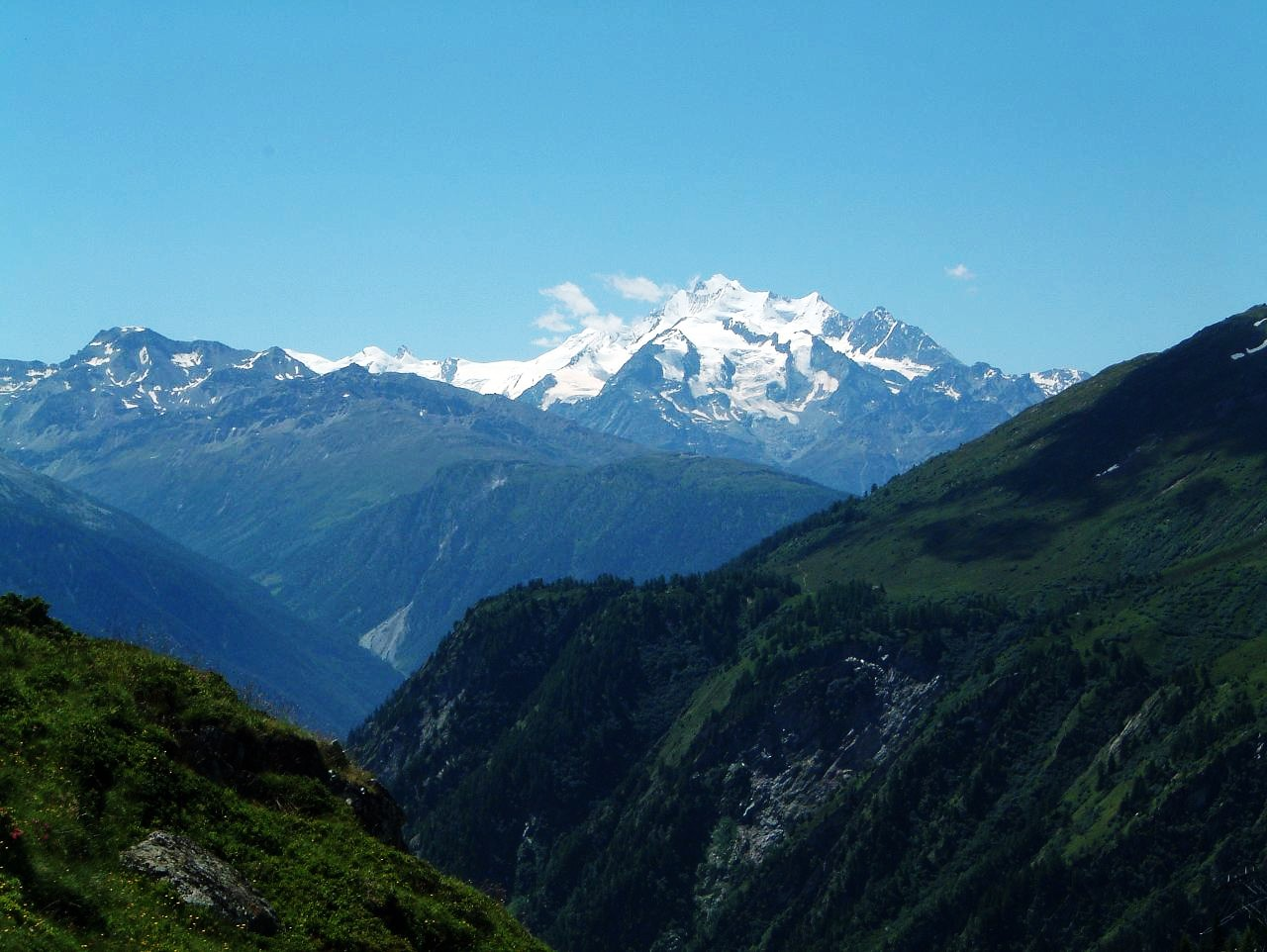
View of Dom from the region of Belalp

Belalp is a village and ski resort in the Swiss canton of Valais, situated at approximately 2,100 metres (6,900 ft) above sea level in the municipality of Naters. Because of its altitude, Belalp is a vantage point offering views of the Dom and Fletschhorn mountains and other peaks of the Pennine and Lepontine Alps. Close to the village are the summits of Nesthorn, Hohstock and Sparrhorn mountains.

Belalp is a car free village. It can be reached from Blatten bei Naters by cable car. With a length of 1,767 metres (5,797 ft), this rises 763 metres (2,503 ft) and can carry a maximum of 740 passengers per hour.

== Notable residents ==
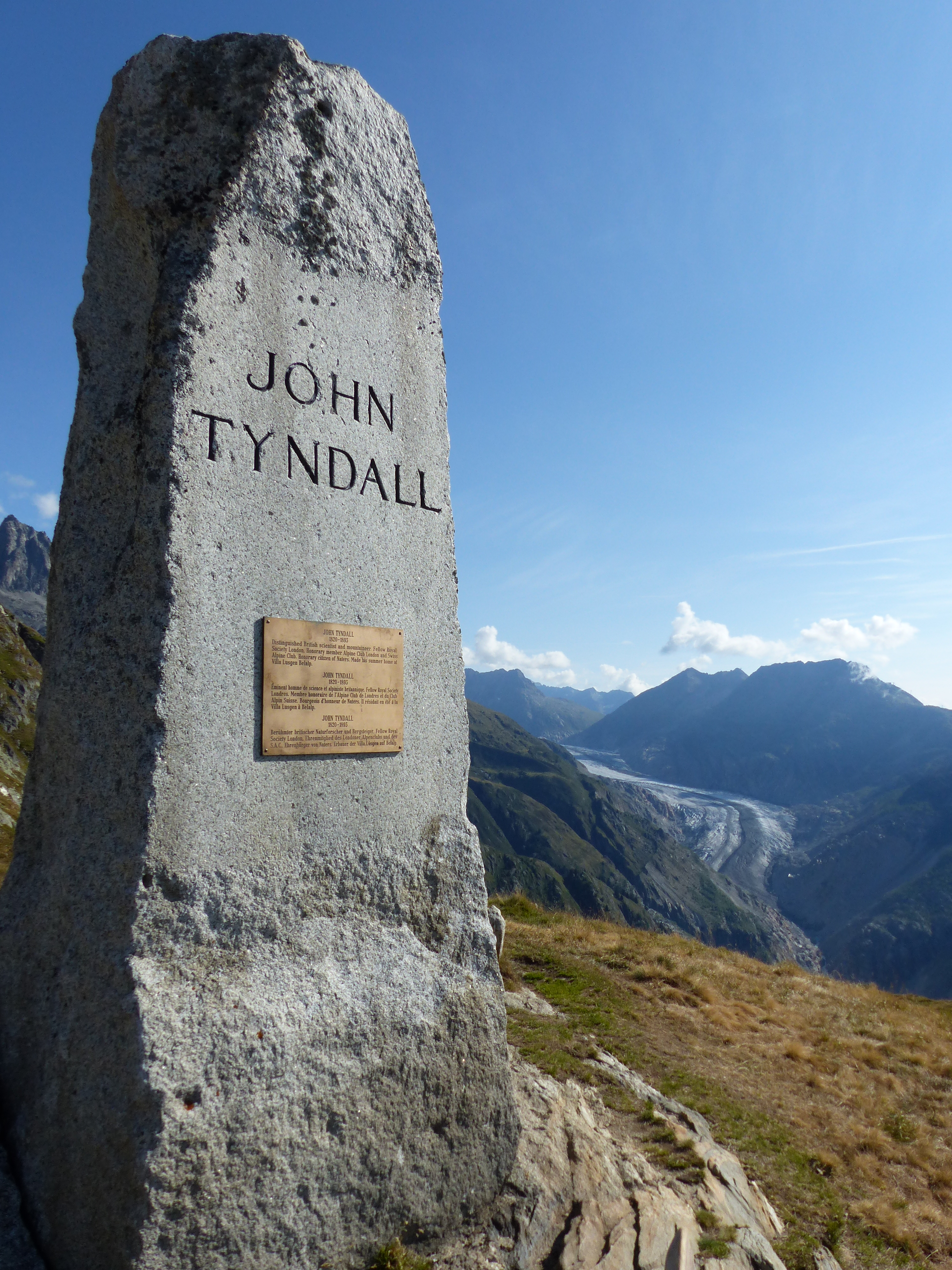
The memorial to John Tyndall, with the Aletsch Glacier in the background

The British and Irish physicist John Tyndall maintained a holiday home in the village from 1877. After his death in 1893, a memorial (the Tyndalldenkmal) was erected at an elevation of 2,340 metres (7,680 ft) on the mountain slopes above the village, and in sight of the Aletsch Glacier, his studies of which had originally brought him to the area.
