= Villa Maund =

Historic villa in Austria built for Sir John Oakley Maund

Coordinates: 47°17′13″N 10°2′58.5″E

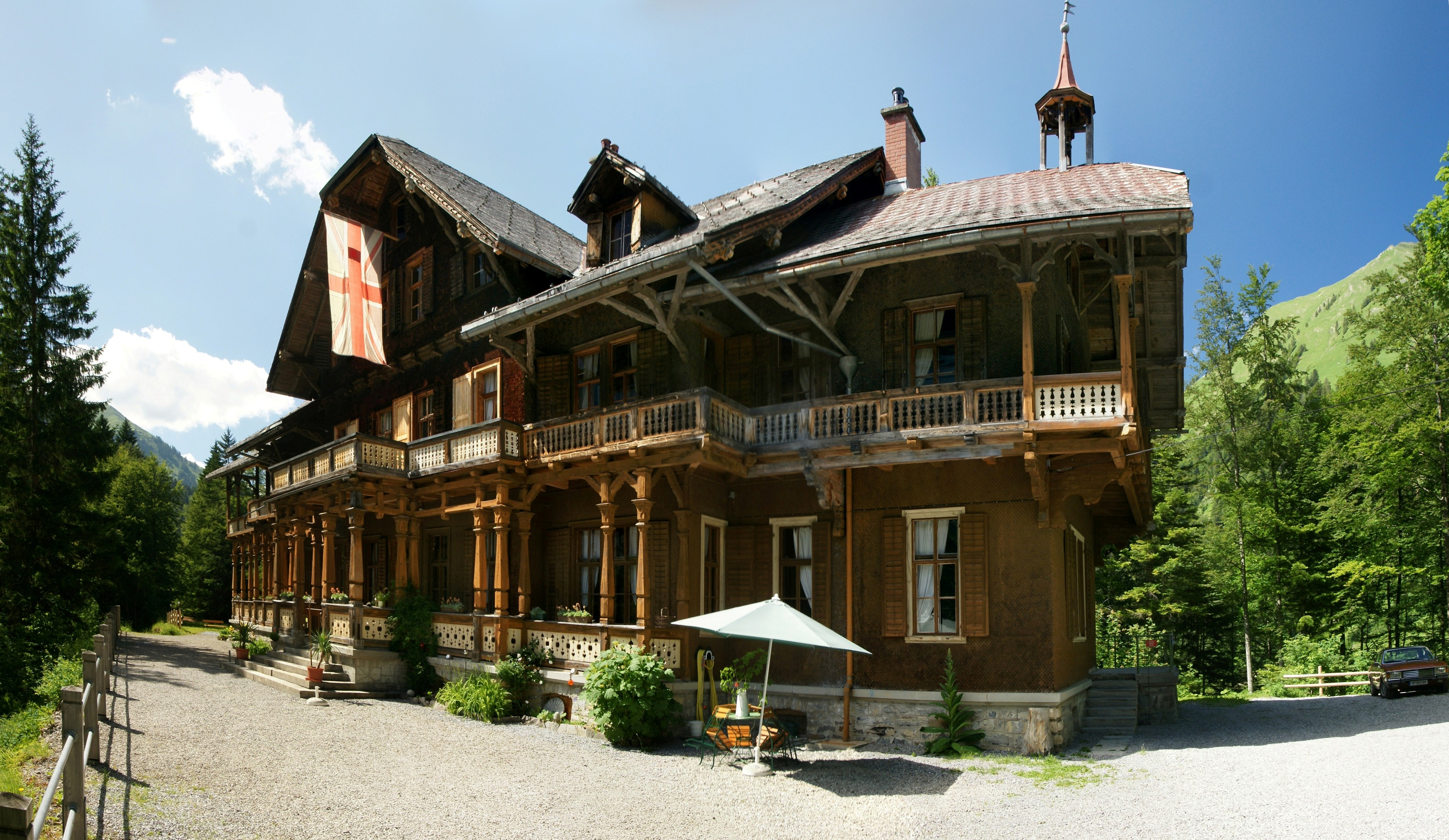
Villa Maund in 2009

Villa Maund is a villa in Schoppernau, Hopfreben in Vorarlberg, Austria, built for Sir John Oakley Maund (died 10 June 1902) between 1891 and 1895.

The German Crown Prince William of the House of Hohenzollern used the villa from 1908 as a hunting lodge. The current owner rents the building for events.

== History ==
The Villa Maund was a hunting lodge built on a spur of the Alps by the English banker and mountaineer Sir John Oakley Maund, one of the first to climb the east summit of the 4,000 metres (13,000 ft) high Les Droites in the Mont Blanc massif. After his death in 1902, it passed into the possession of his daughter Zoe Désirée Maund throughout the whole property, against the will of her mother Zoe Gertraud Maund, and was sold on 17 November 1931 to the Englishman Martin Holt for 750 pounds.

Many hunting parties used the villa, including the German Crown Prince William, who in 1908 was the first motorist in the Bregenzerwald. Other prominent guests over the years included Queen Elizabeth II. From 1995 to 2007 the Vorarlberg artist and campaigner Paul Renner lived in the Villa Maund. Among his guests were Zaha Hadid, Daniel Spoerri, Ferran Adrià, Günter Brus, Franzobel, Heinz D. Heisl and Eckart Witzigmann.

== Architectural history ==
The architect of Villa Maund was William Morris, the English painter, architect, poet, artisan, engineer and printer. In 1888 he had built two similar-looking houses for John Oakley Maund in the Anglo-Scottish cottage style in Weggis on Lake Lucerne in Switzerland. His pattern books (plans, elevations, etc.) can still be seen in the Kunsthaus Zurich.

Master carpenter Johann Anton Strolz from Schröcken was responsible for the construction. Also instrumental in the building was master carpenter Bishop Pius, of Schiffwirt in Au, Vorarlberg. The topping-out ceremony was held in 1892; the villa in the English country style was completed in 1895. The interior of the villa was built entirely by Bregenzerwald craftsmen.

The widow Zoe Gertraud Maund built a small power plant with a dam in 1923, the generator of which delivered direct current to the villa for 47 years.

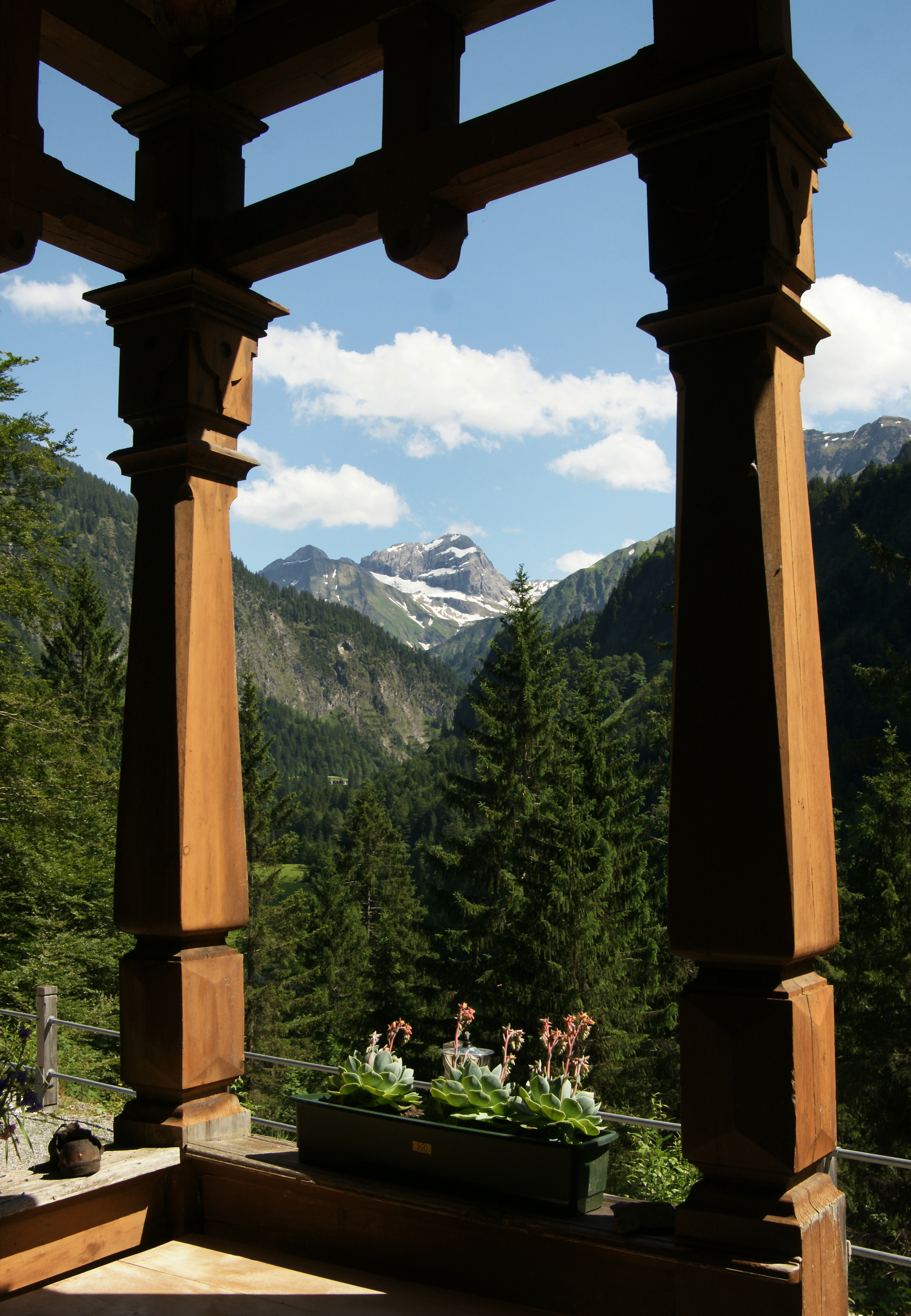
The veranda of Villa Maund with the Mohnenfluh seen in the distance (2009)

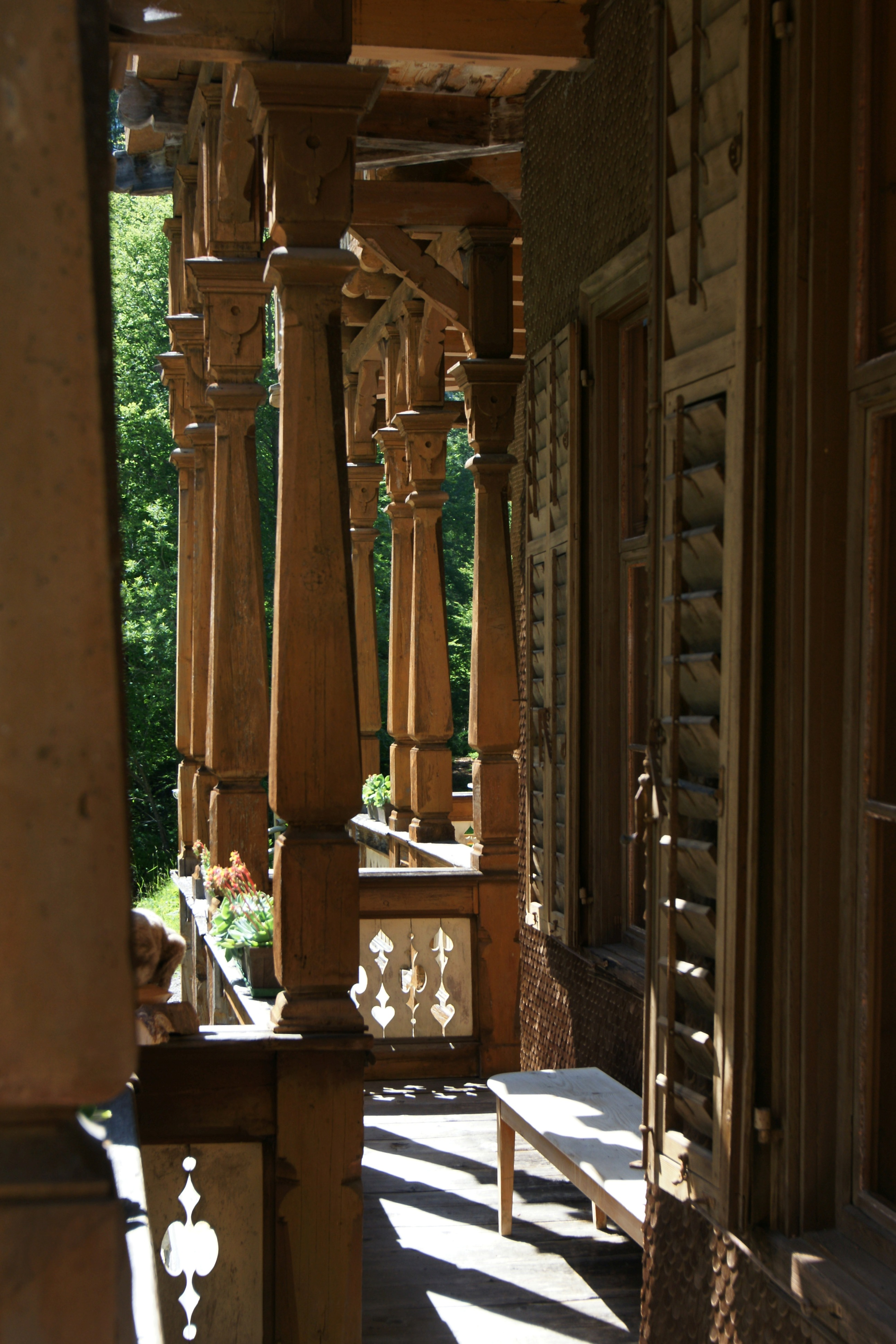
Another view of the veranda of Villa Maund (2009)

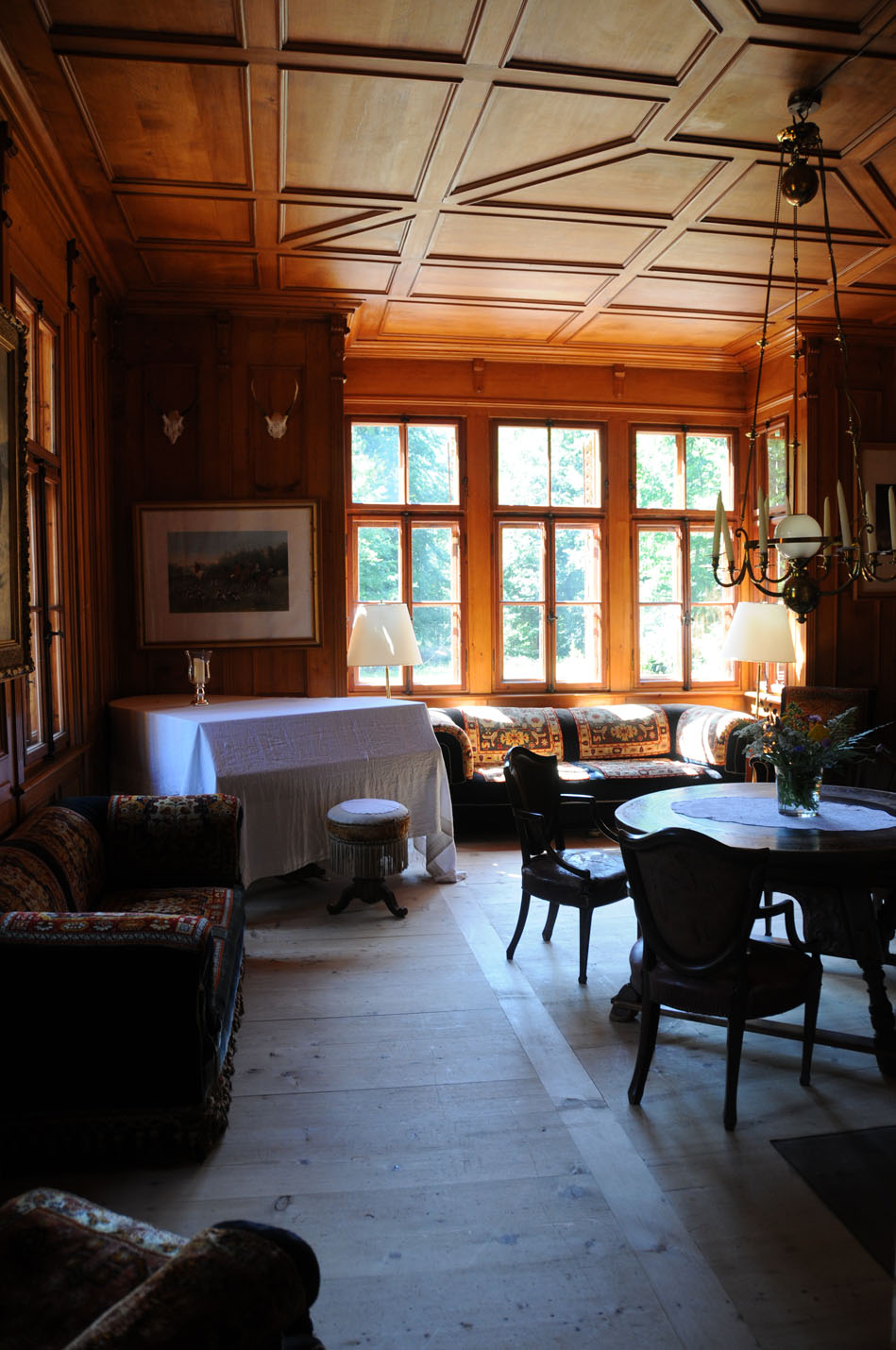
Interior of Villa Maund (2008)

== Hunting ==
Bears and mountain goats lived in Bregenzerwald in the 14th century. The original Maund hunting ground covered the area of Schoppernau, Hopfreben and Schröcken. Today the former territory is divided into many different parcels.

=== Hunting parties ===
After the first hunt in 1895 (Alexander Kennedy, James Fairholm, B. Montgomery, Zoe Gertraud Maund and Lady Carolina Hamilton), Crown Princess Cecilie regularly leased Villa Maund with her husband, Crown Prince Wilhelm, for hunting from 1908 until the end of World War II.

During Cecilie's stay in 1943 she confided to the chief hunter, Theodore Hammerle, that there were "ordentlich viel Schmuck bei sich, welcher hier versteckt werden sollte" ("tidy lots of jewelry with them, which should be hidden here").

== Bibliography ==
- Gästebuch der Villa Maund. 1895.
- Protokollbuch des Vorsäß Hinter-Hopfreben.
- Wilhelm (v. Hohenzollern), Crown Prince (1912). Aus meinem Jagdtagebuch. Stuttgart/Berlin: Deutsche Verlags-Anstalt.
