= John Oakley Maund =

English banker, entrepreneur, and mountaineer

Sir John Oakley Maund (26 May 1846 – 10 June 1902) was an English banker, stockbroker, entrepreneur, hunter and mountaineer during the silver age of alpinism.

== Personal life ==
Maund was born in Laverstock, Wiltshire, the son of William Herbert Maund and Lucy Maund. He served in the Royal Marine Artillery, reaching the rank of lieutenant. In July 1867, he married Mary Emily Baring, daughter of long-time Member of Parliament and Lord of the Treasury Major Henry Bingham Baring. She had been divorced in 1864 from Sir Richard Lewis Mostyn Williams-Bulkeley, 11th Baronet, with whom she had a son; Bulkeley had divorced her for adultery allegedly committed with Lieutenant-Colonel Henry Armitage of the Coldstream Guards. Mary died on 18 February 1887. Maund subsequently married Zoe Gertrude Dudgeon (1868–1935), who outlived him and in 1927 became the second wife of the businessman Vincent Caillard. Maund was known for his quick temper.

== Mountaineer ==
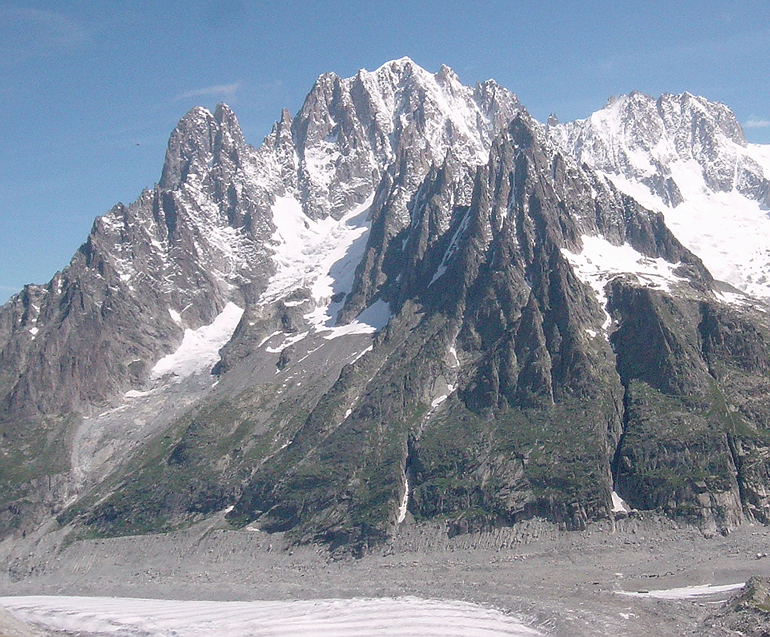
Les Droites (far right), the Aiguille du Dru (far left) and the Aiguille Verte (center)

John Oakley Maund was a mountaineer during the period known as the silver age of alpinism in the second half of the 19th century, and a prominent member of the Alpine Club. He weighed 13.5 stone (189 lb; 86 kg) at the height of his mountaineering career.

From 3 to 5 August 1874, Maund made the third attempt to ascend the main summit of the Meije (Massif des Ecrins in the Dauphiné Alps) via the north ridge with guides Jean Martin and Johann Jaun. The party had to halt the next day due to bad weather; however, the climb was shown to be perfectly feasible.

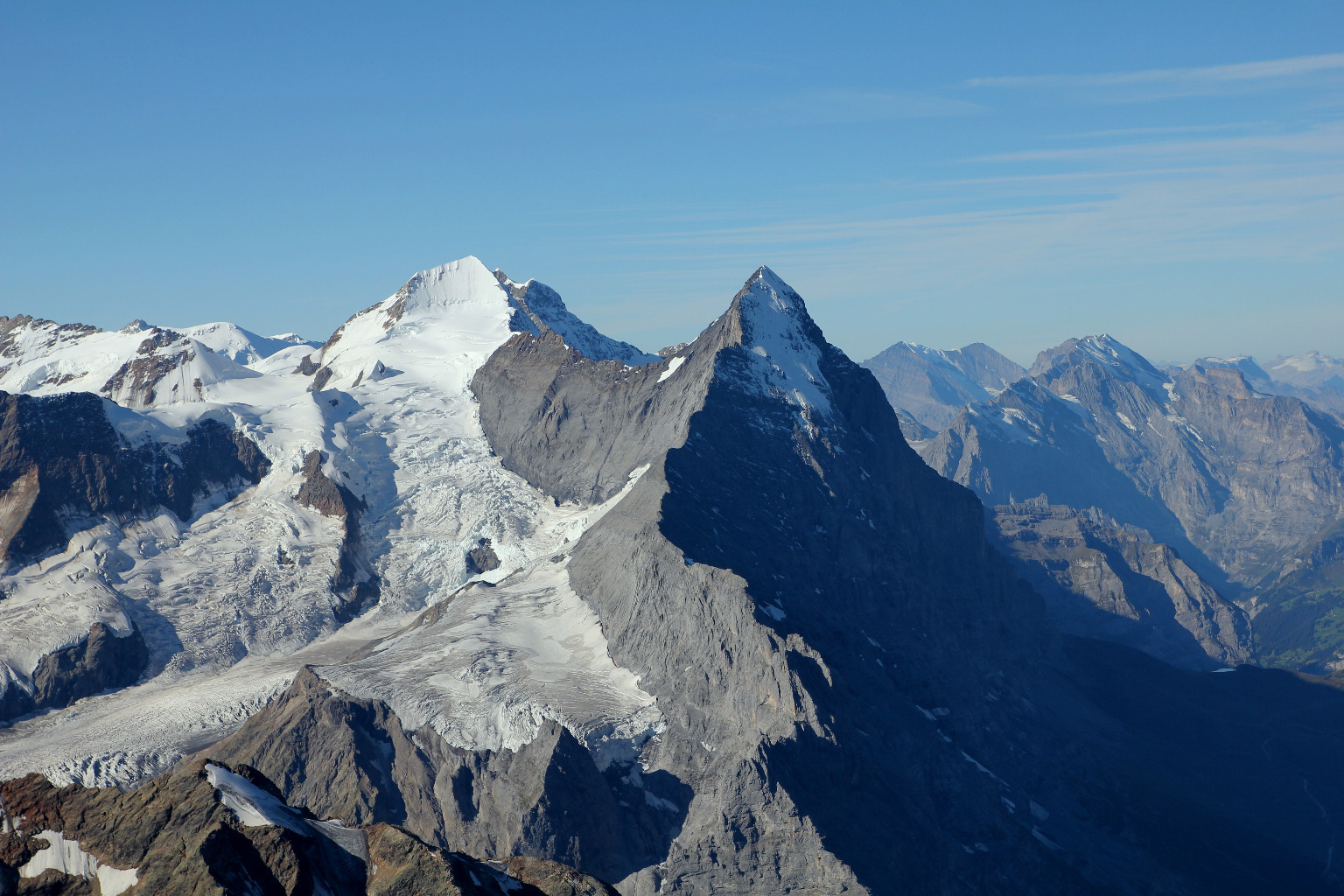
The Mittellegi Ridge (centre, dividing light and shade) leading to the summit of the Eiger

In 1876 Maund made three first ascents in eight days in the Mont Blanc massif. On 31 July 1876 he ascended the Cordier Couloir on the north face of the 4,122 metres (13,524 ft)-high Aiguille Verte with Thomas Middlemore, Henri Cordier and guides Jakob Anderegg, Andreas Maurer and Johann Jaun. The route was not repeated until 1924, and according to Helmut Dumler is "one of the most respected achievements in the history of mountaineering, for the 900m couloir is set at an angle of up to 56°". Claire Engel notes that the party were all nearly obliterated by rockfall while they were crossing the bergschrund. The following week, on 4 August 1876, he ascended the Cordier route on the north face of Les Courtes, again with Thomas Middlemore, Henri Cordier and guides Jakob Anderegg, Andreas Maurer and Johann Jaun, followed by the 7 August 1876 first ascent of the east summit of Les Droites (the lowest of the Alpine 4000ers) with Thomas Middlemore, Henri Cordier and guides Johann Jaun and Andreas Maurer. This ascent was not without incident. In an article in the Alpine Journal Maund wrote:

... we heard a roar far above and on looking up saw two enormous rocks coming with great bounds straight for us. We made a rush across the couloir as fast as we could go, as one touch from such blocks would have been instant annihilation. Cordier slipped and fell, dragging Middlemore down with him. I anchored and went flat on my face, as did Maurer, who was next in front of me. There was a rush of wind followed by a shower of snow, and the rocks were past!

In 1881, on 31 July, he attempted the Mittellegigrat (north-east ridge) of the Eiger, with J. Baumann, Johann Jaun, Andreas Maurer and Emile Rey. This party reached the big step on the ridge, which is now surmounted with the aid of a fixed rope. The ridge was finally ascended in 1925 by Maki Yūkō, Fritz Amatter, Fritz Steuri and Samuel Brawand.

== Entrepreneur ==
Several sources indicate that Maund played an entrepreneurial role in the turbulent period of the British development of the southern part of Africa in the area that later became Rhodesia (Zimbabwe):

In June 1889, about five months before the founding of the British South Africa Company, the "Exploring Company Limited" was registered in London, holding a quarter of the shares of the Rudd-Rhodes Concession. Maund sat on the Board of Directors, with Alfred Beit, Cecil Rhodes, George Cawston and Lord Gifford. The main goal was "the development of the Bechuanaland Protectorate and the countries lying to the North".

In December 1896, the second general meeting of the British West Chartered Company was chaired by Maund. The press transcript shows that the company was working for the development of the mining industry in South Africa and for the rapid northwards extension of the Bechuanaland railway.

== Hunter ==
Maund was a member of English high society and enjoyed going hunting in the Bregenz Forest in Au, Vorarlberg, Austria. In 1888 he leased the hunting cooperative of Au, and finally the entire hunt to the rear of the Bregenz Forest with the forest areas of Schoppernau, Hopfreben and Schröcken by the village of Baad in Kleinwalsertal.

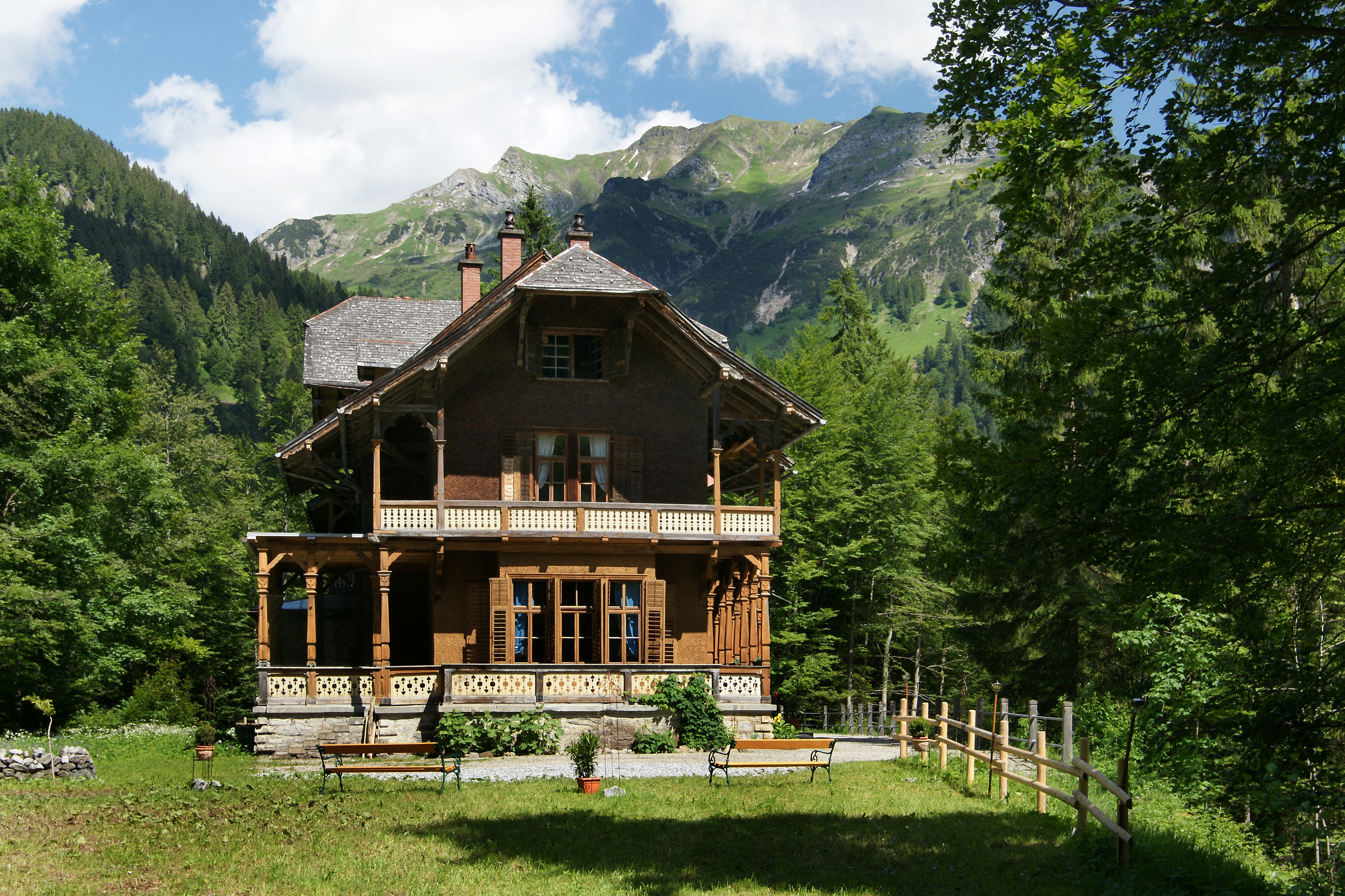
Villa Maund from the west, below the Heiterberg

In the 1890s he bought a secluded site in the municipality of Schoppernau, Hopfreben in the foothills of the Alps, where he built a hunting villa in the English country style, which is known to this day as Villa Maund. The architect was William Morris, the English painter, poet, artisan, engineer and printer, who had built two similar-looking houses for Maund in 1888 in the Anglo-Scottish cottage style in Weggis on Lake Lucerne in Switzerland. After the completion of the building in 1892, the first hunting party used the villa in 1895.

== Publications ==
- Maund, J. Oakley (May 1876). Freshfield, Douglas W (ed.). "Mountain Misadventures". The Alpine Journal: A Record of Mountain Adventure and Scientific Observation. VII (LII). London: Longmans, Green, and Co.: 409–421.
- Oakley Maund (November 1877). Freshfield, Douglas W (ed.). "The Aiguille Verte from the Argentière Glacier". The Alpine Journal: A Record of Mountain Adventure and Scientific Observation. VIII (LVIII). London: Longmans, Green, and Co.: 289–300.
