= Middlemore (disambiguation) =

Middlemore is a southern suburb of Auckland, New Zealand.

Middlemore may also refer to:

- Middlemore Hospital, a hospital in Middlemore, New Zealand
- Middlemores Saddles, horse saddles, bicycle saddles and accessories company formerly based in Birmingham, England

== People ==
- Middlemore (surname)
