= Henri Cordier (mountaineer) =

French mountaineer

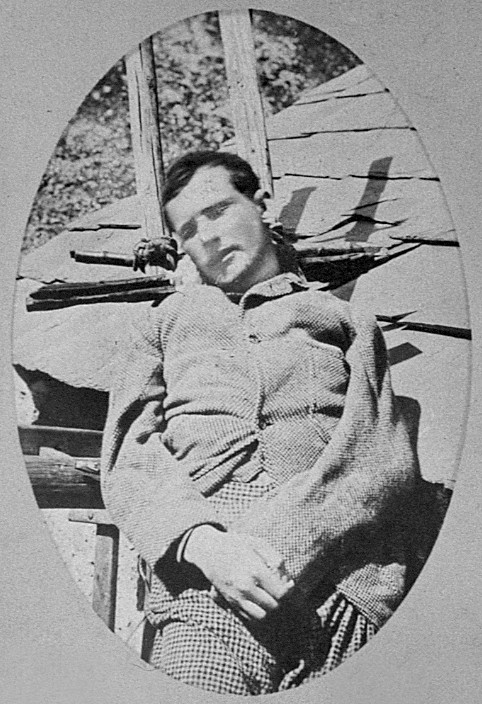
- Henri Cordier's corpse, photographed by Henry Duhamel
- Born: 1856; Bagnères-de-Bigorre, France
- Died: 7 June 1877 (aged 20–21); Le Plaret, France
- Other name: Henry Cordier
- Education: École Libre des Sciences Politiques
- Occupation: Mountaineer
- Years active: 1874–1877
- Relatives: Louis Cordier (grandfather), Louis Ramond de Carbonnières (great-uncle)

Henri Cordier or Henry Cordier (1856 – 7 June 1877) was a French mountaineer. In his short two-year career, he became the first Frenchman to reach the level of the English members of the Alpine Club, in the silver age of alpinism in the second half of the 19th century, which was dominated by the development of mountaineering in the Alps. With some of the Alpine Club's mountain guides and mountaineers, he led significant first ascents in the Mont Blanc massif and in the Dauphiné Alps (the Massif des Écrins).

== Biography ==
A grandson of geologist Louis Cordier and a great-nephew of politician and scientist Louis Ramond de Carbonnières, Henri Cordier pursued studies at the École Libre des Sciences Politiques, founded in 1872, where he received high honors. He was first attracted by the Pyrenees, to which he traveled in 1874, before visiting the Swiss Alps the following year. His brief Alpine career combined talent and audacity. In the 1876 season he succeeded in making eleven first ascents. He claimed to have climbed the western peak of the Meije that year, but was subsequently forced to retract the claim.

== Major ascents ==
- 1874 - Mont Perdu, Vignemale and pic du Midi d'Ossau
- 1876 - Attempt at la Meije (then one of the last virgin peaks), on the north face by les Corridors, with guides Jakob Anderegg, Andreas Maurer and J. Bouillet (of la Grave), 21 June
- 1876 - Aiguille du Plat de la Selle with guides Jakob Anderegg and Andreas Maurer, 28 June
- 1876 - South arête of Le Râteau with Jakob Anderegg and Andreas Maurer, 3 July
- 1876 - Southeast arête of Finsteraarhorn with Jakob Anderegg and Kaspar Maurer, 15 July
- 1876 - Couloir Cordier on the northeast face of the Aiguille Verte with Thomas Middlemore, John Oakley Maund and guides Jakob Anderegg, Andreas Maurer and Johann Jaun, 31 July. This steep snow and ice climb was not repeated until 1924
- 1876 - Voie Cordier on the north face of Les Courtes with Thomas Middlemore, John Oakley Maund and guides Jakob Anderegg, Andreas Maurer and Johann Jaun, 4 August
- 1876 - Les Droites (east summit, highest point at 4,000 metres (13,000 ft)), with Thomas Middlemore, John Oakley Maund and guides Johann Jaun and Andreas Maurer, 7 August
- 1876 - Attempt at the north arête of Piz Bernina, which Cordier declared "absolument impossible" (it was climbed two years later), with Thomas Middlemore and guides Johann Jaun and Kaspar Maurer, 12 August
- 1877 - New attempt at la Meije by the glacier of Tabuchet with Jakob Anderegg and Andreas Maurer, 1 June
- 1877 - Le Plaret, with Jakob Anderegg and Andreas Maurer, 7 June

== Accident ==
Descending from Le Plaret, the group left the glacier, successfully passed the crevasse zone, unroped and ate a meal. Afterwards, Cordier went ahead. In front of his horrified companions, he performed a standing glissade down a steep snow slope above the glacial torrent of La Clause below the surface. The snow surface broke suddenly and Cordier was carried away by the white water under the ice and drowned. Jakob Anderegg was lowered into the twelve-foot hole on a rope, but could find no trace of Cordier and nearly suffocated before being pulled up. According to Henri Béraldi, Cordier had very poor eyesight, but refused glasses due to vanity. As he amused himself by slipping on the snowy slope, he was alerted by his guides and replied, "Ne vous inquiétez pas, je vais m'arrêter sur ce rocher noir" ("Do not worry, I'll stop on the black rock"). Unfortunately for Cordier, the rock in reality was a hole.

Cordier's body was recovered the next morning forty feet below the location of his disappearance. The corpse was photographed by Henry Duhamel at La Bérarde. Henri Cordier was 21 years old.

== Legacy ==
In memory of Henri Cordier, the Pic de Neige Cordier, located above the Glacier Blanc in the Massif des Ecrins, was named after him. It was climbed for the first time on 3 August 1877 by Paul Guillemin, Émile Pic, and Pierre Estienne. Cordier also gave his name to posterity in two first-routes, which he had executed in 1876 with Thomas Middlemore, John Oakley Maund and guides Jakob Anderegg, Andreas Maurer and Johann Jaun: the Cordier Couloir on the North Face of the Aiguille Verte and the Cordier route on the north face of Les Courtes (both in the Mont Blanc massif).

== Bibliography ==
- Cordier, Henry (1877). "Courses nouvelles dans les Alpes suisses" [New routes in the Swiss Alps.]. Annuaire du Club Alpin Français (in French).
- Cordier, Henry (August 1877). Freshfield, Douglas W (ed.). "Ascension du Finsteraarhorn par le Rothhornsattel". The Alpine Journal. VIII (LVII). London: Longmans, Green, and Co.: 262–269.
- Freshfield, Douglas W., ed. (August 1877). "The Death of M. Cordier". The Alpine Journal. VIII (LVII). London: Longmans, Green, and Co.: 284–286.
- Oakley Maund (November 1877). Freshfield, Douglas W (ed.). "The Aiguille Verte from the Argentière Glacier". The Alpine Journal. VIII (LVIII). London: Longmans, Green, and Co.: 289–300.
- Duhamel, Henry (1885). "À propos du piolet d'Henry Cordier". Annuaire du Club Alpin Français (in French). (Description of the accident and discussion)
