= Franz Michael Felder =

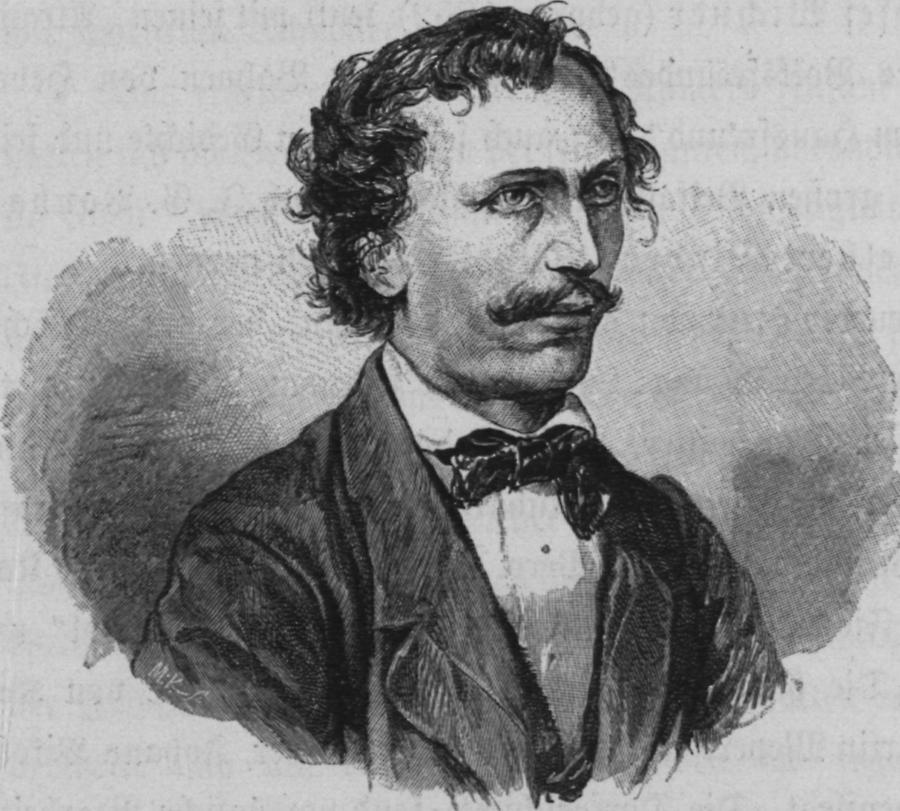
- Portrait by Wilhelm Hecht
- Born: 13 May 1839; Schoppernau
- Died: 26 April 1869 (aged 29); Schoppernau
- Occupations: Social reformer, writer, farmer
- Organization: Vorarlberg'sche Partei der Gleichberechtigung (1867/68)
- Spouse: Anna "Nanni" Katherina Moosbrugger
- Children: 5

Franz Michael Felder (13 May 1839 – 26 April 1869) was a social reformer, author and farmer from Vorarlberg (Austria).

== Life ==
Born in Schoppernau, Vorarlberg Franz Michael Felder grew up in very simple mountain farming circumstances. Having lost his father early on, he and his mother eked out a meagre existence on the small family farm. Felder was faced with a series of fateful setbacks (including the loss of vision in one eye as a result of medical malpractice). During his short life he was astonishingly productive and left behind a rich legacy of social projects and literary works. Already in his younger years he became critically aware of the two main social and economic evils facing the farmers of the Bregenzerwald: Their abject dependence on those who controlled the sales and pricing of dairy products – specifically cheese products – and the ideological conditioning of a church bent on keeping its parishioners uneducated. His socially critical novels and stories, written in the tradition of Jeremias Gotthelf, centered largely around village life, with strong tendencies towards literary and poetic realism. Felder achieved fame and recognition when the publishing house Hirzel in Leipzig brought out his novels "Sonderlinge" and "Reich und Arm".

In the 19th century a large part of the Bregenzerwald population lived from cheese production. The dairy economy in the second half of this century was dominated by the so-called Käsegrafen (literally "Cheese Barons") – export and import monopolists who manipulated dairy production and prices by purchasing and selling large quantities of milk. In fact, they completely controlled the market for milk and cheese. In the 1860s the reactionary regional church had begun supporting these powerful Käsegrafen, the most prominent of whom was Gallus Moosbrugger. The farmers and peasants, on the other hand, continued to live in poverty, often deeply in debt to the Cheese Barons and dependent on their whims for a meagre livelihood.

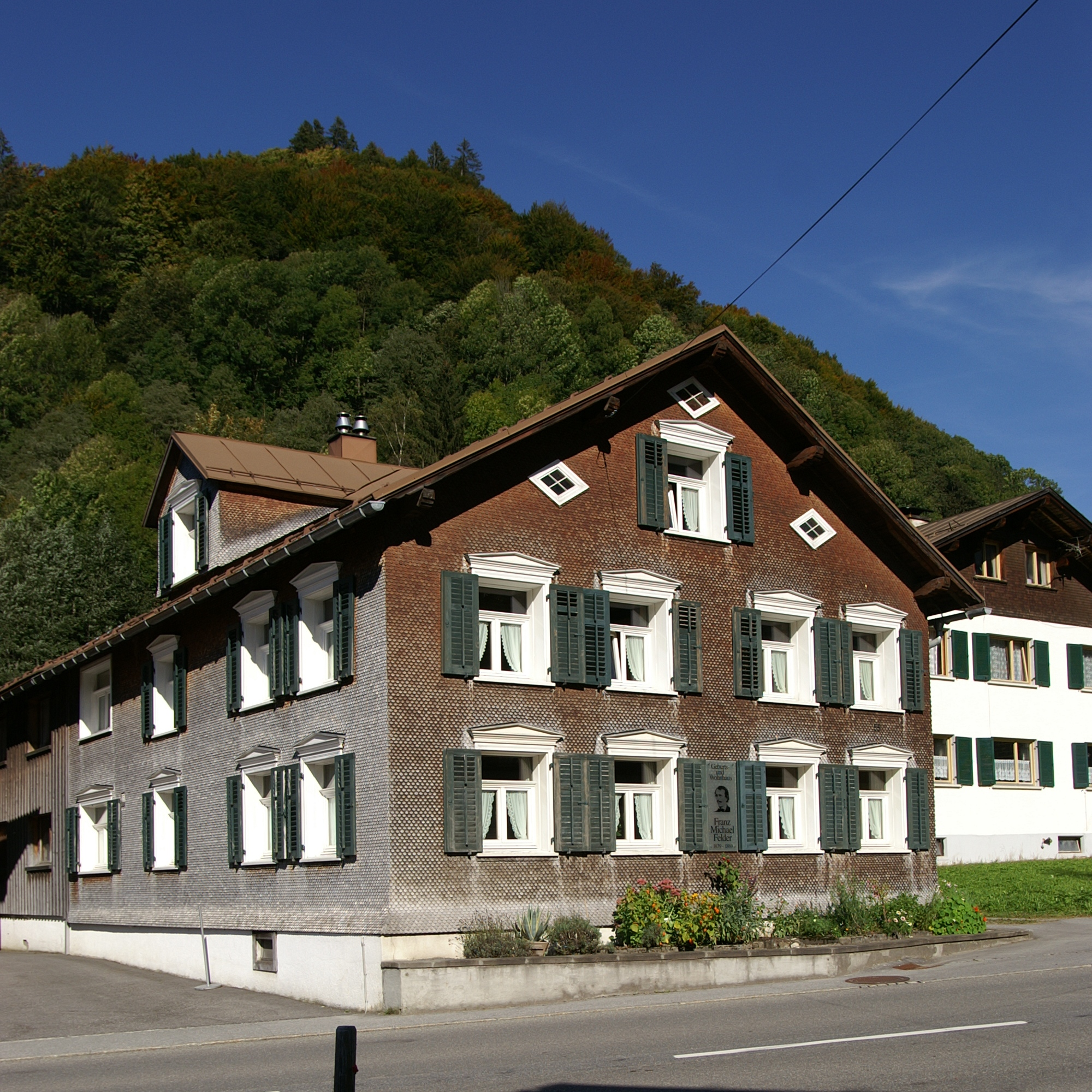
House of Felder's birth in Schoppernau

Himself a farmer and social activist, Franz Michael Felder became an untiring opponent of these Käsegrafen, hoping to break their monopoly on the dairy products trade in the Bregenzerwald. Seeking to alleviate the poverty of the dairy farmers, he advocated a fair distribution of taxes and established a cheese trade association in the form of a dairy cooperative, as well as an insurance company to protect the farmers' livestock. His private home housed a newspaper reading room, a small public library, and it also became a meeting place for discussing church policies. Together with his brother-in-law Kaspar Moosbrugger (1830–1917), Felder founded the "Vorarlberg'sche Partei der Gleichberechtigung" (Vorarlberg Party for Equality) in 1866. The party members demanded, among other things, universal and secret voting rights (also for women) and the establishment of a workers' association. Apart from the frictions between Felder, the Käsegraf Gallus Moosbrugger, and the church (conflict situations frequently arose with the regional ultramontane clergy, Felder had many other enemies. Many of the villagers called him a heretic, "red republican", Freemason and antichrist. He was forced to flee from Schoppernau several times.

On 4 February 1861 Felder married his long-time acquaintance Anna Katherina Moosbrugger, known as "Nanni". Seven years later, in 1868, she died suddenly, after a short illness, leaving him behind with their five children (Jakob, Kaspar, Hermann, Martin and Katherina). Seven months later, on 26 April 1869, Franz Michael Felder died of tuberculosis at age 29 in his birth house in Schoppernau. A few months before his death he had written his autobiography, Aus meinem Leben. In the decades after his death, arguments and controversies arose about his legacy. For example, the 1875 unveiling of his monument in the local cemetery upset many of the local villagers.

== Works ==
- Nümmamüllers und das Schwarzokaspale. Lindau: Stettner 1863
- Sonderlinge. Leipzig: Hirzel 1867
- Reich und Arm. Leipzig: Hirzel 1868
- Aus meinem Leben, 1869 (published 1904)

== Museum ==
The Franz Michael Felder museum is located in Schoppernau, Felder's place of birth. It displays his life as author and social reformer by means of quotations, photographs and texts.
