= Charpoua Hut =

Mountain refuge in Haute-Savoie, France

Coordinates: 45°55′27″N 6°57′19″E

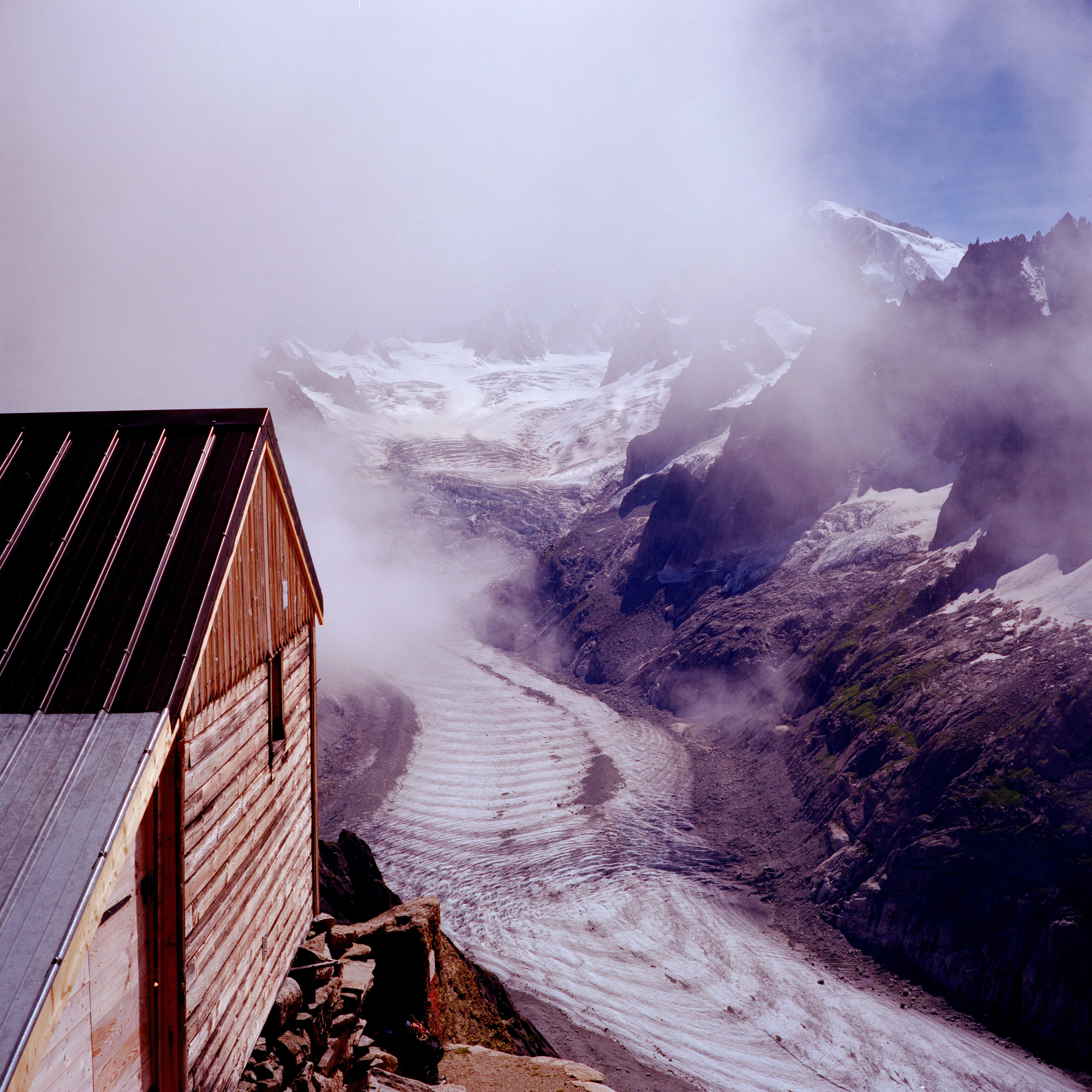
- Interactive map of the Charpoua Hut area

General information
- Elevation: 2,841 m (9,321 ft)
- Year built: 1904
- Owner: Compagnie des Guides de Chamonix

Website
- refugecharpoua.wixsite.com/refugecharpoua

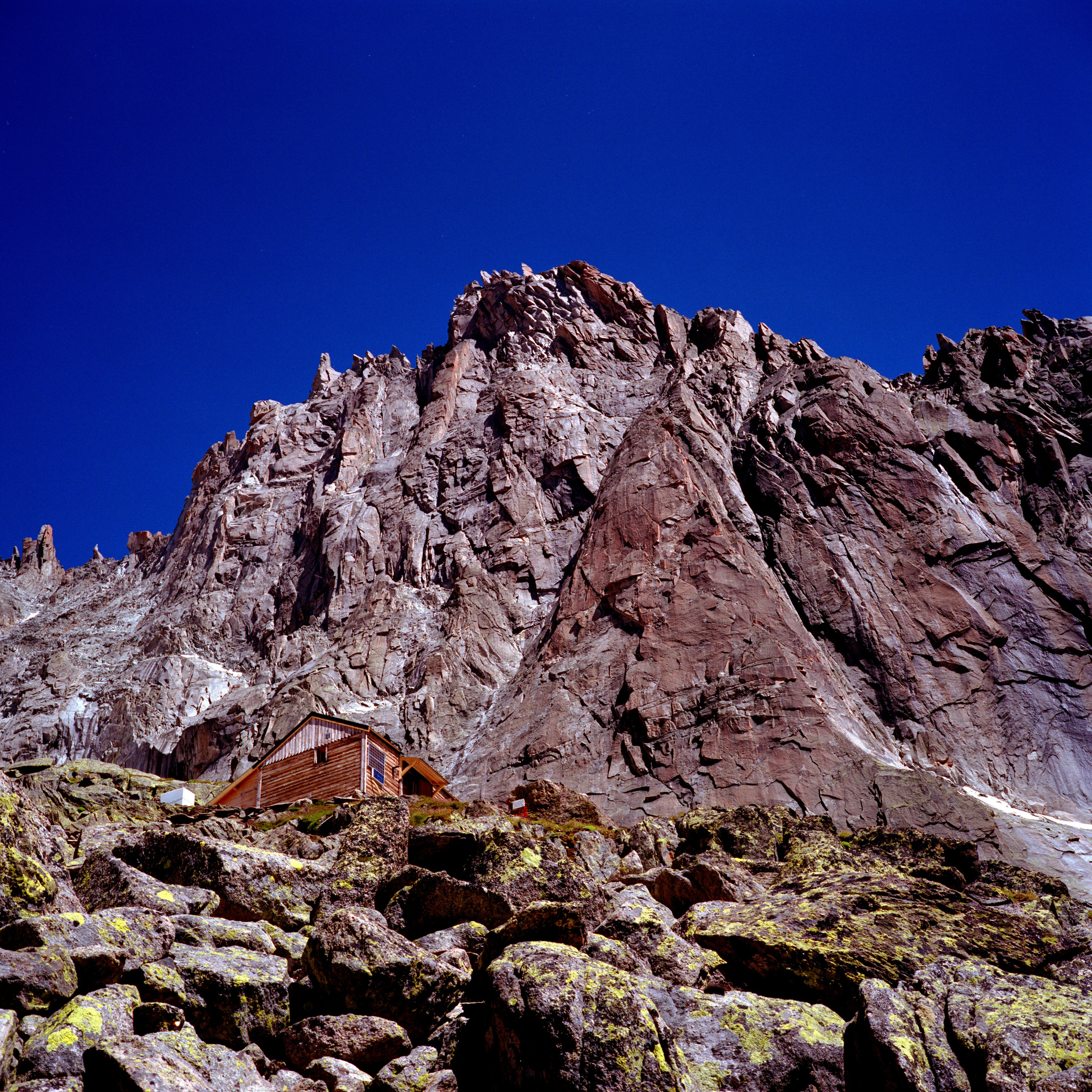
Charpoua Hut, below Aiguille Verte

The Charpoua Hut (French: Refuge de la Charpoua) is a refuge in the Mont Blanc massif in the Alps. Built in 1904, it is located above the north bank of the Mer de Glace under the southwest side of the Aiguille Verte at an altitude of 2,841 meters above sea level.

The old wooden hut was closed in 2022 and is scheduled to be rebuilt, with a planned reopening in 2023.

== History ==
It was constructed between 1903 and 1904 on a rocky spur situated south of the Aiguille du Dru and the Aiguille Verte.

== See also ==
- List of mountain huts in the Alps
