= Vorarlberg School =

Group of architects based in Austria

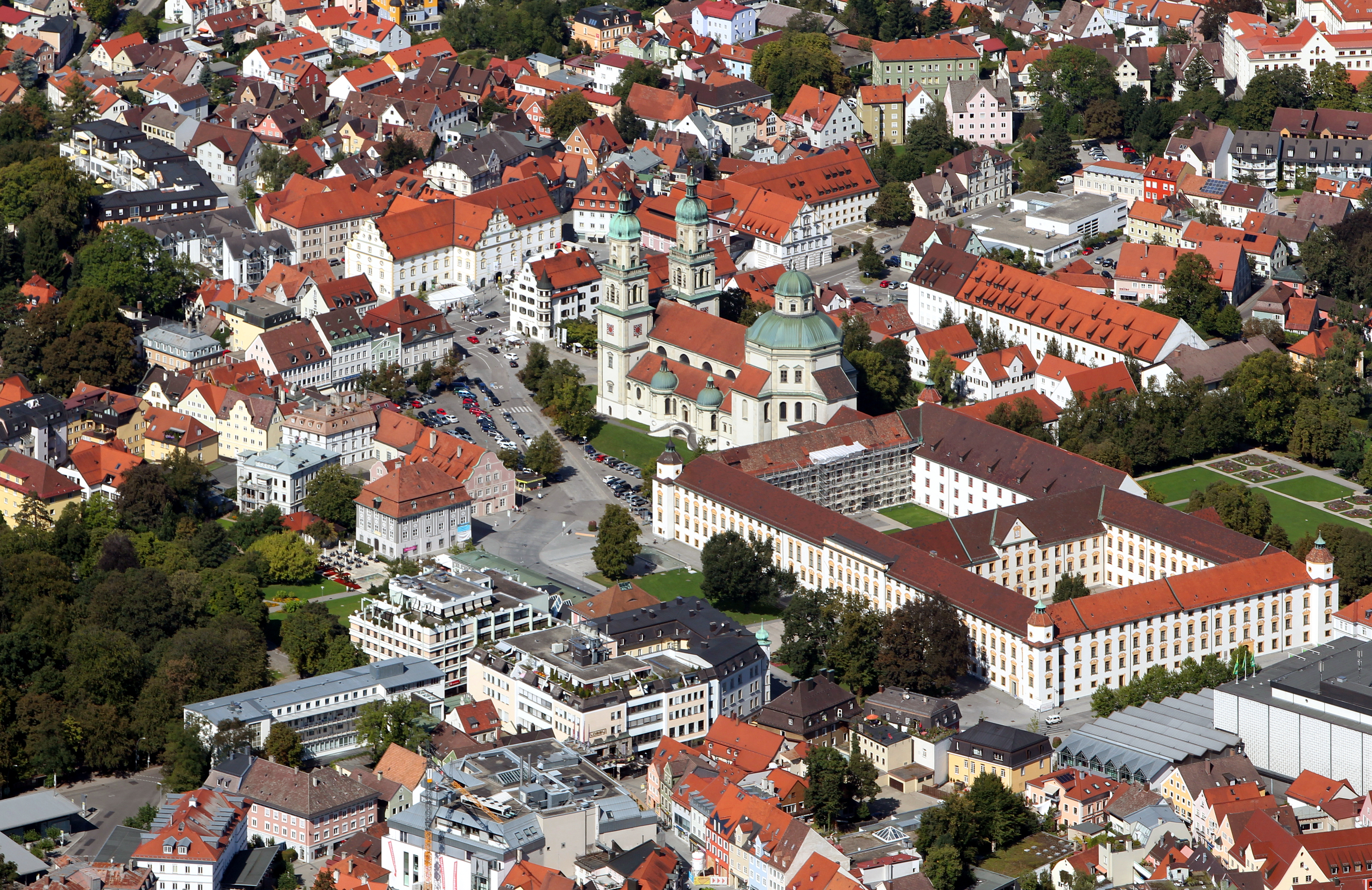
The Collegiate Church of St. Lorenz, Kempten (Germany)

The Vorarlberg School of Architecture (German: Vorarlberger Schule) or Guild of Au (German: Auer Zunft) refers to a group of architects and builders founded in 1657 by Johann Michael Beer in the town of Au im Bregenzerwald in Vorarlberg (Austria).

The school remained active in southern Germany and Switzerland until the end of the 18th century. Its most important members came from the Beer (for example Franz Beer), Moosbrugger and Thumb families (for example Peter Thumb). The Vorarlberg School developed a distinct design for churches known as Vorarlberger Münsterschema. The school is notable for its skillful blending of buildings (most of which are abbeys) with the surrounding landscape.

== Museum ==
In 2021, the Museum of Baroque Master Builders in Au was opened. It is located in the renovated "Kurathus".

The museum deals with the founding history of the Auer Zunft and the work of the Baroque master builders and also with the contemporary design competence of the members of the Au craft guild. Topics such as thinking in cooperatives, quality awareness and the model of supra-regional transfer of skills are highlighted. In addition, the Baroque master builder museum tells a piece of local and regional history.
