= Franz Beer =

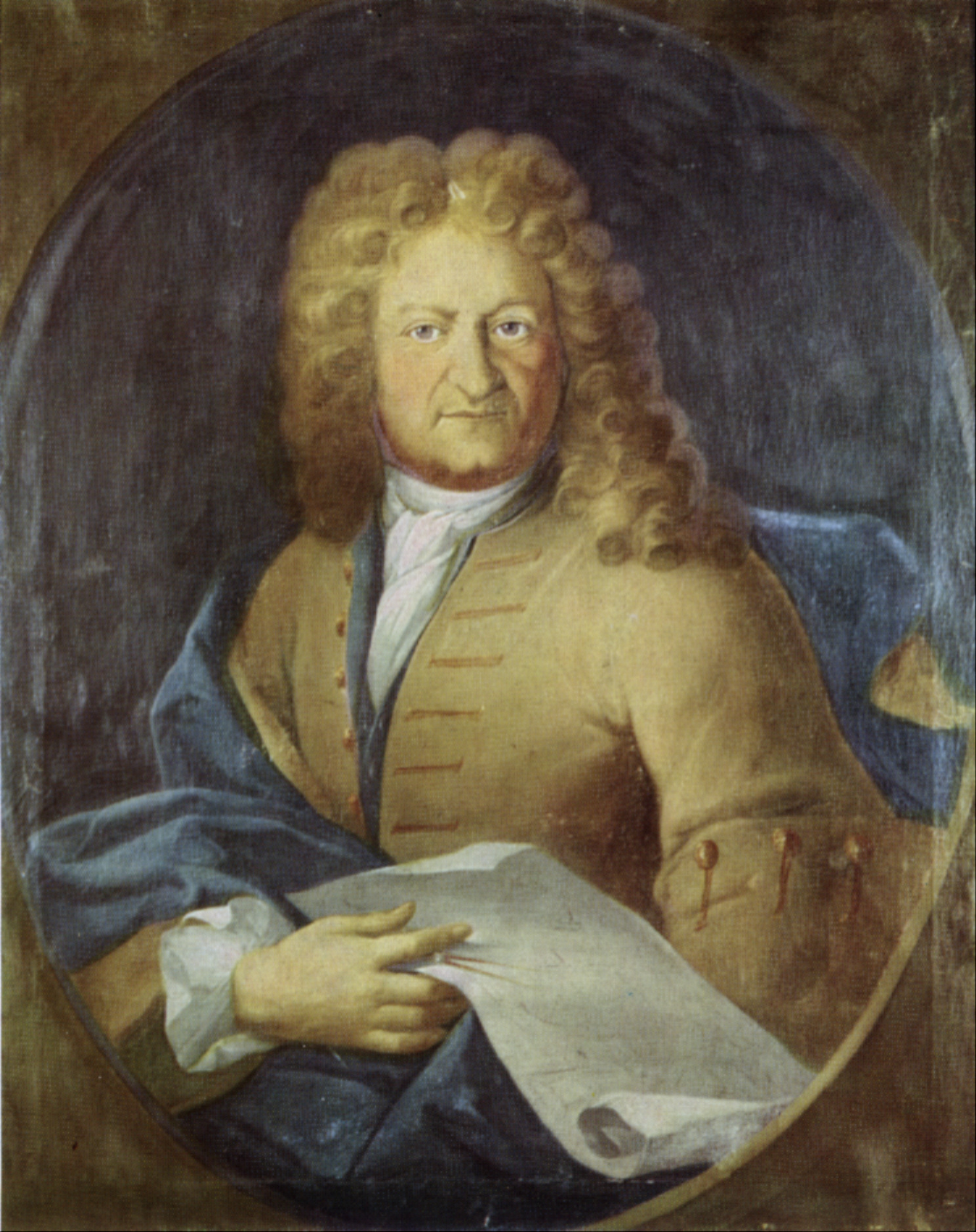
Franz Beer, ca. 1711/1715

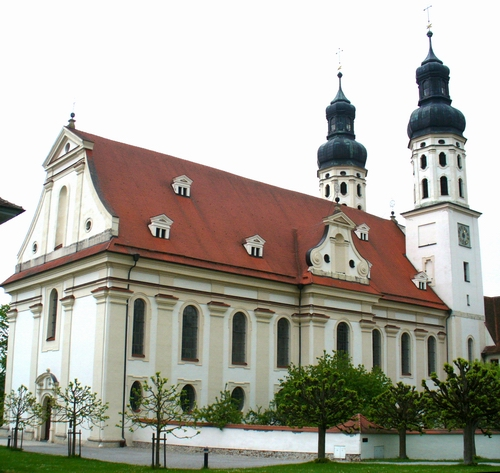
Marchtal Abbey, church

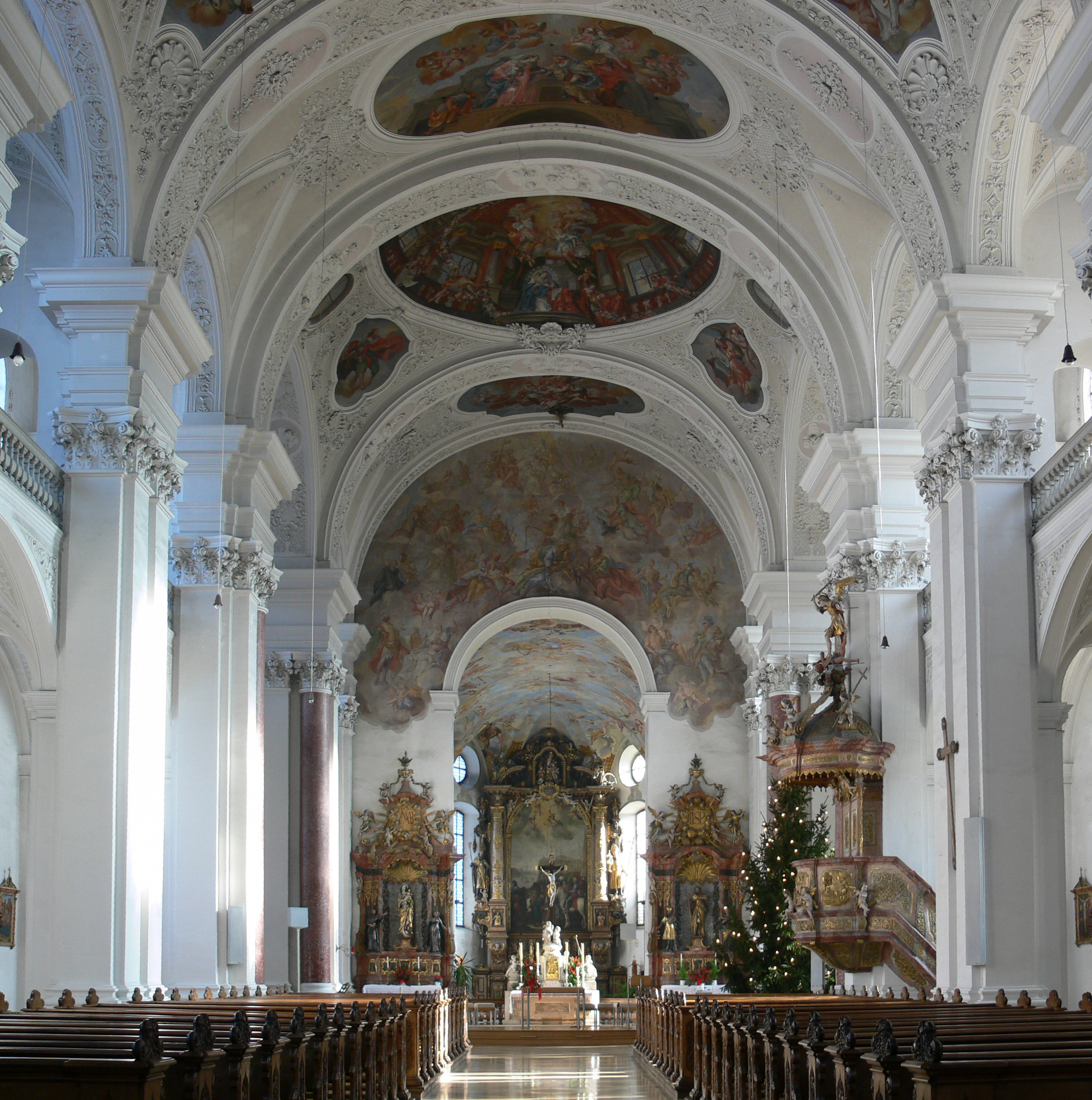
Interior of abbey church at Weissenau

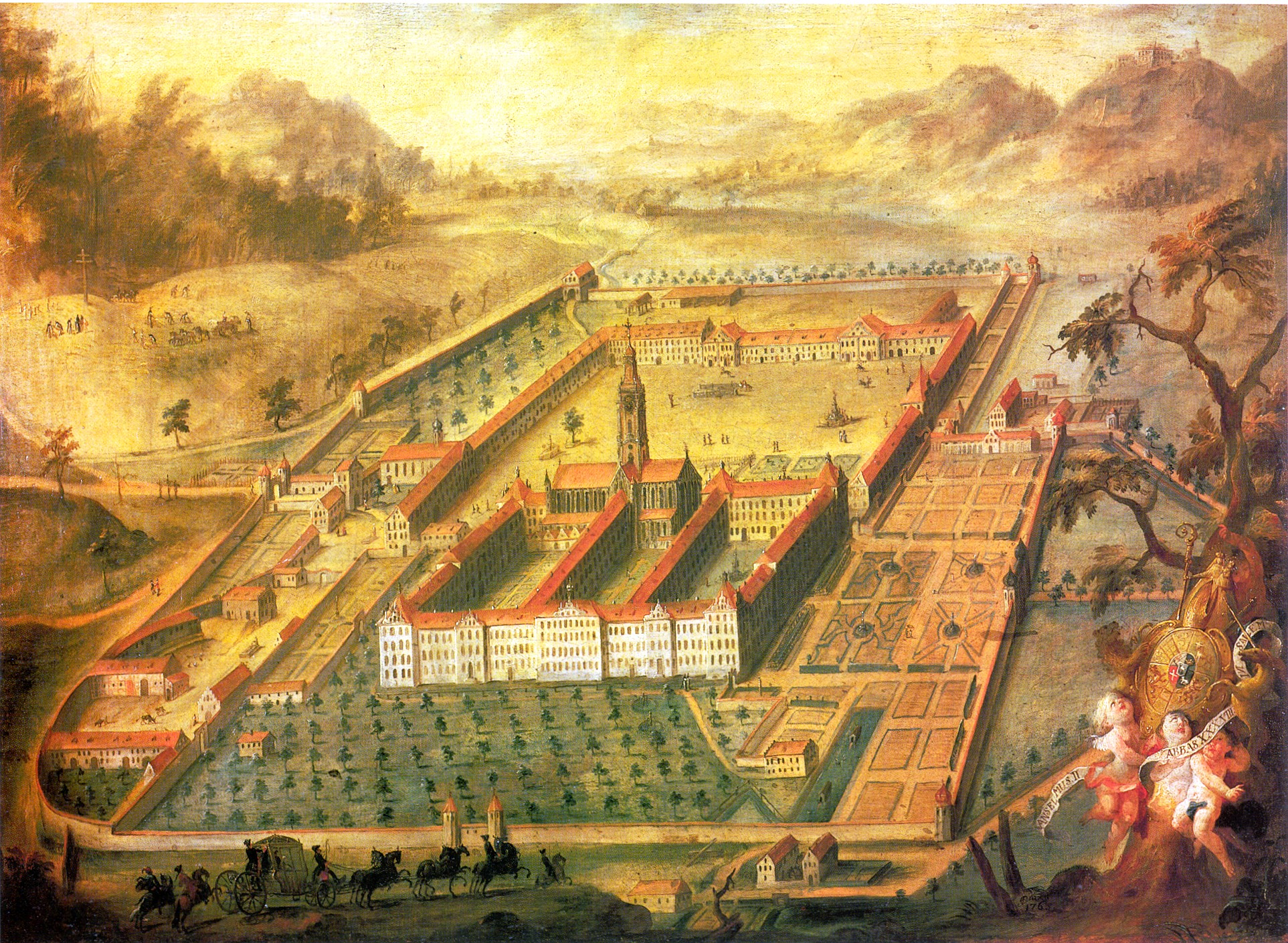
Salem Abbey ca. 1765

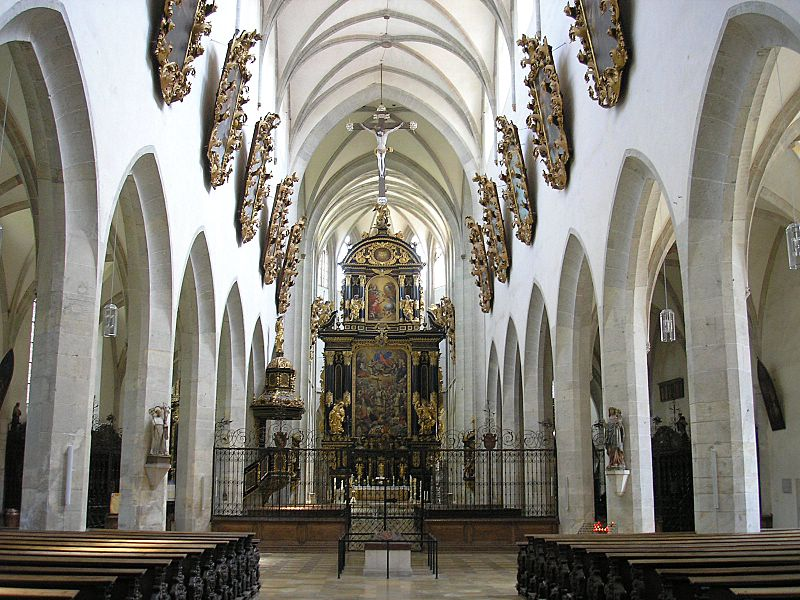
Kaisheim Abbey, interior of church

Franz Beer (3 July 1659 – 19 January 1726), also known as Franz Beer von Blaichten, was an architect during the Baroque period, mainly working on church buildings at monasteries in southern Germany, chiefly in Upper Swabia, and Switzerland. His son Johann Michael Beer also was an architect.

Born in Au im Bregenzerwald in Vorarlberg, Beer was apprenticed to Michael Thumb. His first major project was the monastery church at Marchtal Abbey near Obermarchtal which he completed after the death of Thumb in 1690, together with the latter's son, Christian Thumb, also an architect. He also had the churches at Rheinau Abbey and the monastery of Saint Urban, both in Switzerland, built. Amongst other projects, he was involved in the construction of the churches at Weingarten Abbey, which started in 1717, and Weissenau Abbey from 1717 until 1724.

Together with Michael Thumb, Christian Thumb and Kaspar Moosbrugger, he was one of the main representatives of the so-called Vorarlberg School of architecture (Auer Zunft), which continued the Roman Baroque ideal of long edifices with galleries and mainly two bell towers.

In 1722, he was ennobled and took the name Franz Beer, Edler von Blaichten.

He died in the Austrian town of Bezau.

== Works ==
- Marchtal Abbey, abbey church.
- Rheinau Abbey, abbey church.
- Saint Urban's Abbey, abbey church.
- Weingarten Abbey, abbey church.
- Salem Abbey, reconstruction of the monastery 1697-1710, including a chapel in nearby Stefansfeld.
- Hauterive Abbey, from 1715
- Kaisheim Abbey, from 1716
- Gengenbach Abbey, reconstruction of the monastery and bell tower 1690-1722.
- Weissenau Abbey, reconstruction of the church 1717-1723/
