= Thomas Middlemore =

English mountaineer

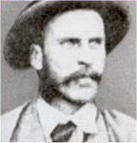
Thomas Middlemore

Thomas Middlemore (1842 – 16 May 1923) was an English mountaineer who made multiple first ascents during the silver age of alpinism. His audacity earned him a reputation as the enfant terrible within the Alpine Club. He was also the head of the Middlemores Saddles leather goods company in Birmingham, England, after the retirement of his father, William Middlemore, in 1881. Thomas Middlemore had taken over the management of the company in 1868 and established a bicycle saddle factory in Coventry.

== Mountaineering ==
The north-east face of the Aiguille Verte, with the Cordier Couloir marked in purple

In August 1870 Middlemore climbed Monte Rosa, the Strahlhorn and the Wetterhorn with guide Jakob Anderegg of Meiringen while qualifying for membership of the Alpine Club. In 1872 he made a traverse of the Matterhorn together with Frederick Gardiner and the guides Jean-Joseph Maquignaz, Johann Jaun and Peter Knubel of St. Niklaus in the canton Valais.

According to Claire Engel, Middlemore was one of the first alpinists to climb routes in the Alps of an unprecedented degree of difficulty and danger:

Middlemore's crossing of the Col des Grandes Jorasses made his Alpine Club colleagues realize that mountaineering had found a new mode of expression. With his guide, Jaun, and their porter he spent his time dodging falling stones ... One wonders here at the extraordinary lack of foresight displayed by both Middlemore and his guide, or at the indifference to the most elementary rules of prudence.

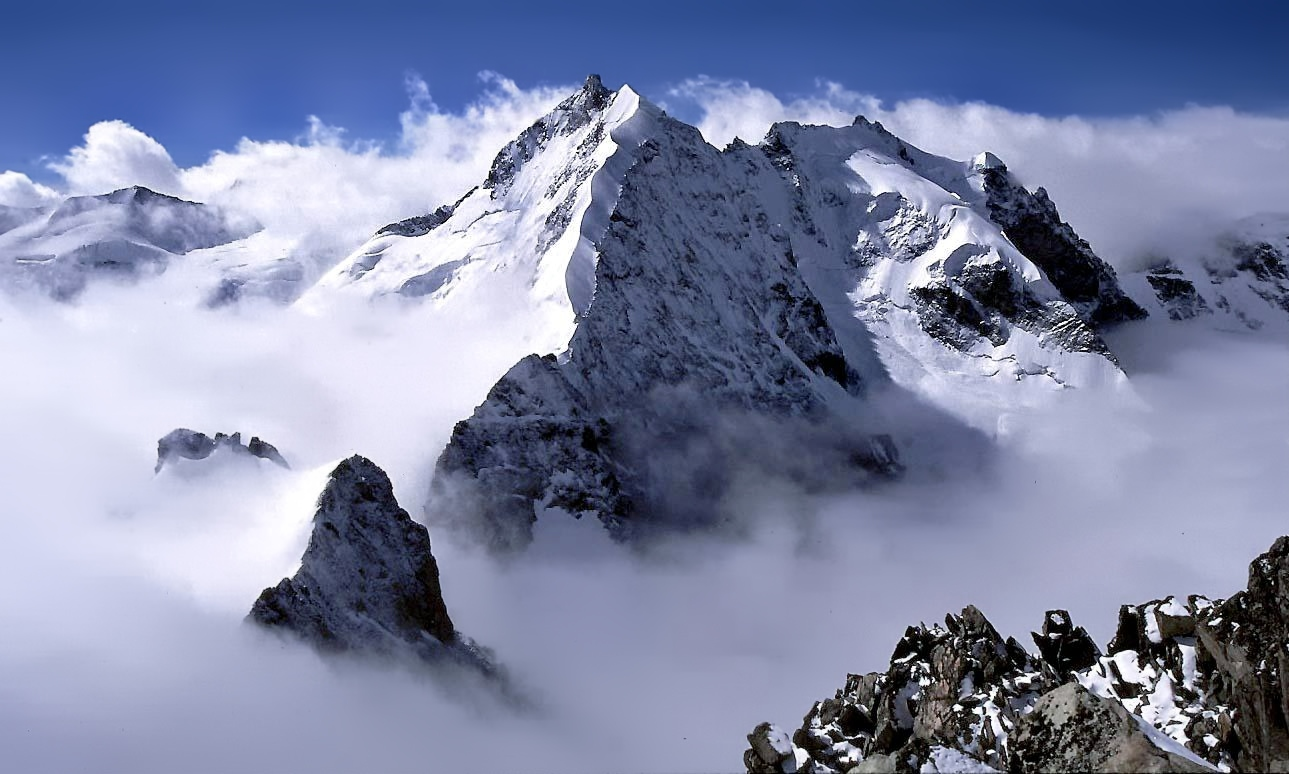
Piz Bernina. Middlemore made the first ascent of the celebrated Biancograt (centre)

The ethics of employing a guide and then taking him into an area where there was significant objective danger created a considerable controversy at the time.

On 31 July 1876 Middlemore made the first ascent of the north-east face of the Aiguille Verte by what is now known as the Cordier Couloir with the London stockbroker John Oakley Maund, the Chamonix guide Henri Cordier, Grindelwald guides Johann Jaun, Andreas Maurer, and Jakob Anderegg. The route was not repeated until 1924, and according to Helmut Dumler is "one of the most respected achievements in the history of mountaineering, for the 900m couloir is set at an angle of up to 56°". Engel notes that the party were all nearly obliterated by rockfall while they were crossing the bergschrund.

On 7 August 1876 Middlemore and Maund, together with Henri Cordier, Jaun and Maurer, made the first ascent of one of the last remaining unclimbed 4000m summits of significance in the Alps: the east (and higher) summit of Les Droites. Again, their ascent was not without incident. In an article in the Alpine Journal Maund wrote:

... we heard a roar far above and on looking up saw two enormous rocks coming with great bounds straight for us. We made a rush across the couloir as fast as we could go, as one touch from such blocks would have been instant annihilation. Cordier slipped and fell, dragging Middlemore down with him. I anchored and went flat on my face, as did Maurer, who was next in front of me. There was a rush of wind followed by a shower of snow, and the rocks were past!

Two days later Middlemore, Cordier and Maund left Chamonix for Pontresina in the Bernina Range. Maund, suffering from poisoning having drunk from a can with a soldered brass nozzle, stayed behind in Geneva. Although Middlemore was himself ill, he made a number of important first ascents from his base in Pontresina with Maurer, Cordier and Jaun, starting with the first ascent of the serpentine Biancograt ("White ridge") on Piz Bernina on 12 August 1876, the Monte Rosso di Tschierva (a first ascent) and Piz Roseg from the Tschierva Glacier. On the first ascent of Piz Roseg's north ridge on 18 August Middlemore's foot was injured by a loose stone, causing him to faint from pain; Jaun prevented him from falling.

== Later life ==
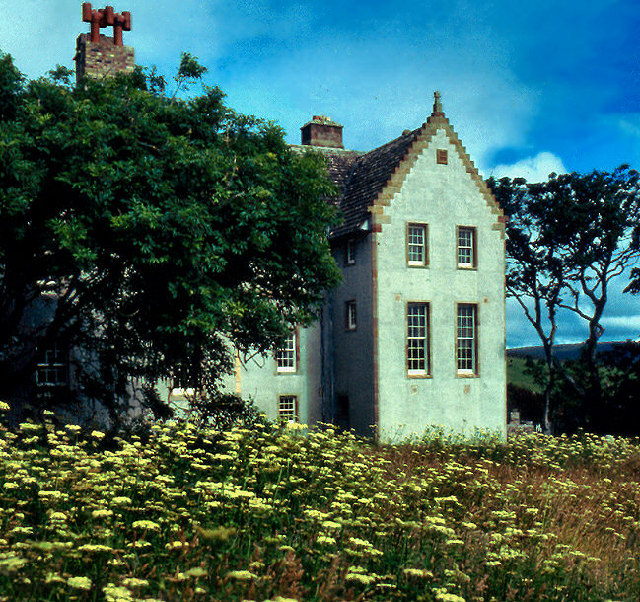
Melsetter House, Hoy, Orkney

Middlemore's father died in 1889, and Middlemore inherited the company outright. By this time Middlemore and his wife, Theodosia, were prominent figures in Birmingham. Middlemore sold the leather business in 1896. In 1898 he purchased the Melsetter Estate in the Orkney Islands of Scotland. The 40,000-acre estate included the island of Hoy and the smaller islands of South Walls, Fara and Rysa. Middlemore commissioned architect William Lethaby, a prominent figure in the Arts and Crafts Movement, to rebuild Melsetter House.

Middlemore died of pneumonia at Melsetter on 16 May 1923. His wife, Theodosia Middlemore, died in 1944.

== First ascents ==
- 1873: Aletschjoch (and a new route on the Aletschhorn)
- 20 July 1873: Schalihorn with Johann Jaun and Christian Lauener
- 1874: Traverse of the Col des Grandes Jorasses with Johann Jaun and Joseph-Marie Rey
- 31 July 1876: Cordier Couloir on the Aiguille Verte with John Oakley Maund, Henri Cordier, Johann Jaun, Kaspar Maurer and Jakob Anderegg. This steep snow and ice climb was not repeated for forty-eight years
- 4 August 1876: Les Courtes with Henri Cordier, John Oakley Maund, Jakob Anderegg, Johann Jaun and Andreas Maurer, by the north face (Voie Cordier)
- 7 August 1876: Les Droites with John Oakley Maund, Henri Cordier, Johann Jaun and Andreas Maurer
- 12 August 1876: Biancograt on Piz Bernina (as far as Piz Alv) with Henri Cordier, Johann Jaun and Kaspar Maurer
- 18 August 1876: North ridge of Piz Roseg with Henri Cordier, Johann Jaun and Kaspar Maurer

== Publications ==
- Middlemore, Thomas (1866). "The Birmingham Saddlery Trade". In Timmins, Samuel (ed.). The Resources, Products, and Industrial History of Birmingham and the Midland Hardware District: A Series of Reports, Collected by the Local Industries Committee of the British Association at Birmingham, in 1865. British Association for the Advancement of Science. Committee on Local Industries. London: Robert Hardwicke. pp. 463–476.
- Middlemore, T. (May 1877). Freshfield, Douglas W (ed.). "Expeditions from the Tschierva Glacier". The Alpine Journal: A Record of Mountain Adventure and Scientific Observation. VIII (LVI). London: Longmans, Green, and Co.: 198–203.
- Middlemore, Thomas (1886). "Saddlery Trade". Handbook of Birmingham. British Association for the Advancement of Science. Birmingham: Hall and English. pp. 348–352.
