= Pic de Neige Cordier =

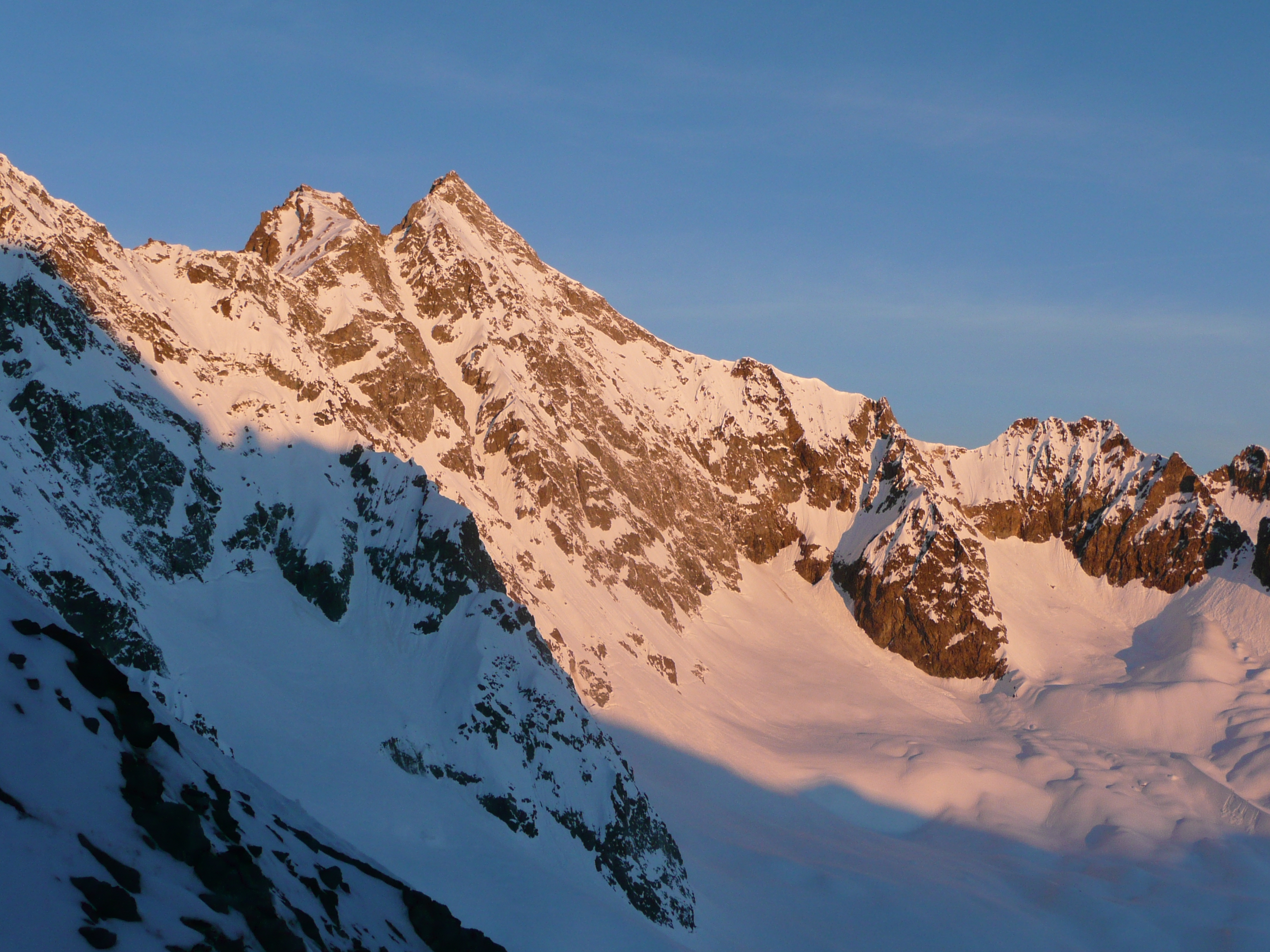
- East face, April 2008

Highest point
- Elevation: 3,614 m (11,857 ft)
- Prominence: 136.5 m (448 ft)
- Coordinates: 44°57′22″N 6°23′20″E

Geography
- Location within France
- Location: Hautes-Alpes, France
- Parent range: Massif des Écrins

Climbing
- First ascent: 3 August 1877

Pic de Neige Cordier is a mountain in the Massif des Écrins range, located in the Hautes-Alpes département of France. The mountain is named after the French alpinist Henri Cordier.

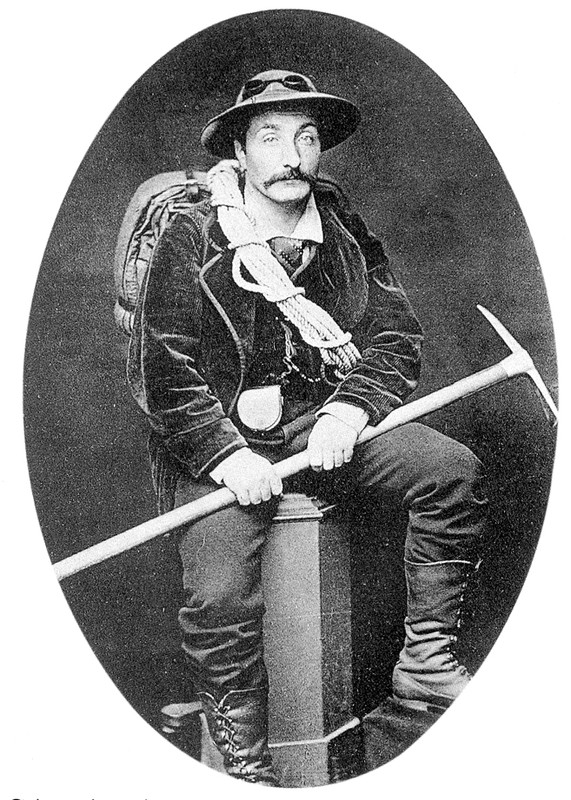
Paul Guillemin

== First ascent ==
The first ascent of Pic de Neige Cordier was made on 3 August 1877 by French climber Paul Guillemi along with Émile Pic and Pierre Estienne.

== 2011 accident ==
On 26 June 2011 a British hiker discovered the bodies of six climbers around 2,700 m (8,858 ft) while following a similar route taken by the group on the previous day. The local mayor, Xavier Cret, told the AFP news agency that the six mountaineers had been roped together in two groups and they have appeared to have died as the result of a mixed avalanche of snow and rocks. A local official stated that the victims included two men and three women between 42 and 64 and a 16-year-old boy. Police reported that the climbers appeared to have died while making an ascent in good weather.
