= Middlemores Saddles =

Middlemores (Coventry) Ltd
- Traded as: Richard Middlemore & Sons, William Middlemore, Middlemore And Lamplugh, Middlemores (Coventry) Ltd
- Industry: Leather goods, mainly saddlery
- Founded: Early 1800s
- Founder: Richard Middlemore
- Defunct: 1991
- Fate: Dissolved
- Headquarters: Birmingham, Birmingham and Coventry, Coventry, England
- Key people: Richard Middlemore, William Middlemore, James Middlemore, Thomas Middlemore
- Products: Bicycle saddles, horse saddles, harnesses, military ammunition pouches and belts, cigar cases

Middlemores Saddles was a horse saddles and accessories company based in Birmingham, England, with origins dating to the early nineteenth century. After several name changes they ended their time as a bicycle saddle and accessories company in Coventry in the late twentieth century. The company had a trading period that can be documented to at least 160 years; making it one of the most longevous companies to operate in England.

== History ==
The origins of Middlemores Saddles go back to when Richard Middlemore had a company at 31 Holloway Head, Birmingham. On 31 December 1831 Richard Middlemore & Sons was dissolved and debts paid off by his sons William (1802-1887) and James Middlemore (1807-1891) and the company started again as William Middlemore.

The sons had joint control until 1841 when William took over by mutual consent. Their brother Richard, 1804–1891, chose medicine to become an eye surgeon. William's son, John, (1844-1924) worked with them but later became an MP and Baronet, a title his son William Hawkslow Middlemore (1908-1987) inherited.

The factory supplied horse saddles and accessories to the military in the pre-motorised days. A House of Lords Select Committee survey into wages paid by such contracted companies found William Middlemore paid the best wages. In 1860 they employed 400 workers being one of the largest employers in the UK.

William retired in 1881 and another son, Thomas Middlemore (1842–1923), who was also a well-known mountain climber, became head of the company.

Thomas retired in 1896 and in 1898 purchased the Melsetter Estate on the Orkney Islands. Also in 1896, the firm William Middlemore joined Lamplugh & Co. to become Middlemore & Lamplugh Ltd. this was after buying an additional factory at 89 Little Park Street, Coventry, to make bicycle saddles and accessories.

In 1920 the company was liquidated, the Holloway Head factory absorbed by D. Mason & Sons Ltd, Birmingham and the Coventry bicycle saddle division becoming a separate company Middlemores (Coventry) Ltd. A 1920 advert shows them as 'Middlemores (Coventry) Ltd (late Middlemore & Lamplugh Ltd)'.

After 1920 saddles had a sidestamp with the brand name 'Middlemores' and a rear badge with the brand name 'Middlemore', depending on the model they had either or both. In 1953, they expanded to Torrington Avenue, Coventry. During this period former racing cyclist/manager Bob Thom worked at Middlemores.

The Little Park Street factory continued on after the Torrington Avenue purchase but was forced to close in 1961 due to the council's compulsory purchase order of various buildings in the street for them to be demolished for their redevelopment plans.

Examples of models are the tri-sprung B3 and for sportier bicycles the B89 and narrower, cutaway-sided version, the B89N. The B89N, has a nosepiece with a patent number 20242/60 stamped onto it, this was applied for in 1960 and granted in 1961. A former worker recalled how they made a saddle for Princess Margaret.

Middlemores also made rebadged saddles for at least two bicycle companies. For Moulton they were named the M89 and had a rear badge in metal with the name "Moulton". For the "Viscount" range of bikes made by "Trusty of England" they had a Trusty/Viscount sidestamp and a plastic rear badge with "Viscount".

The company existed, at least on paper, until 21 May 1991 when an extraordinary general meeting took place at 141 Great Charles Street, Birmingham, where it was decided that due to debt the company could no longer continue in business and would voluntarily be liquidated.
