= Louis Cordier =

French geologist, petrograph and mineralogist

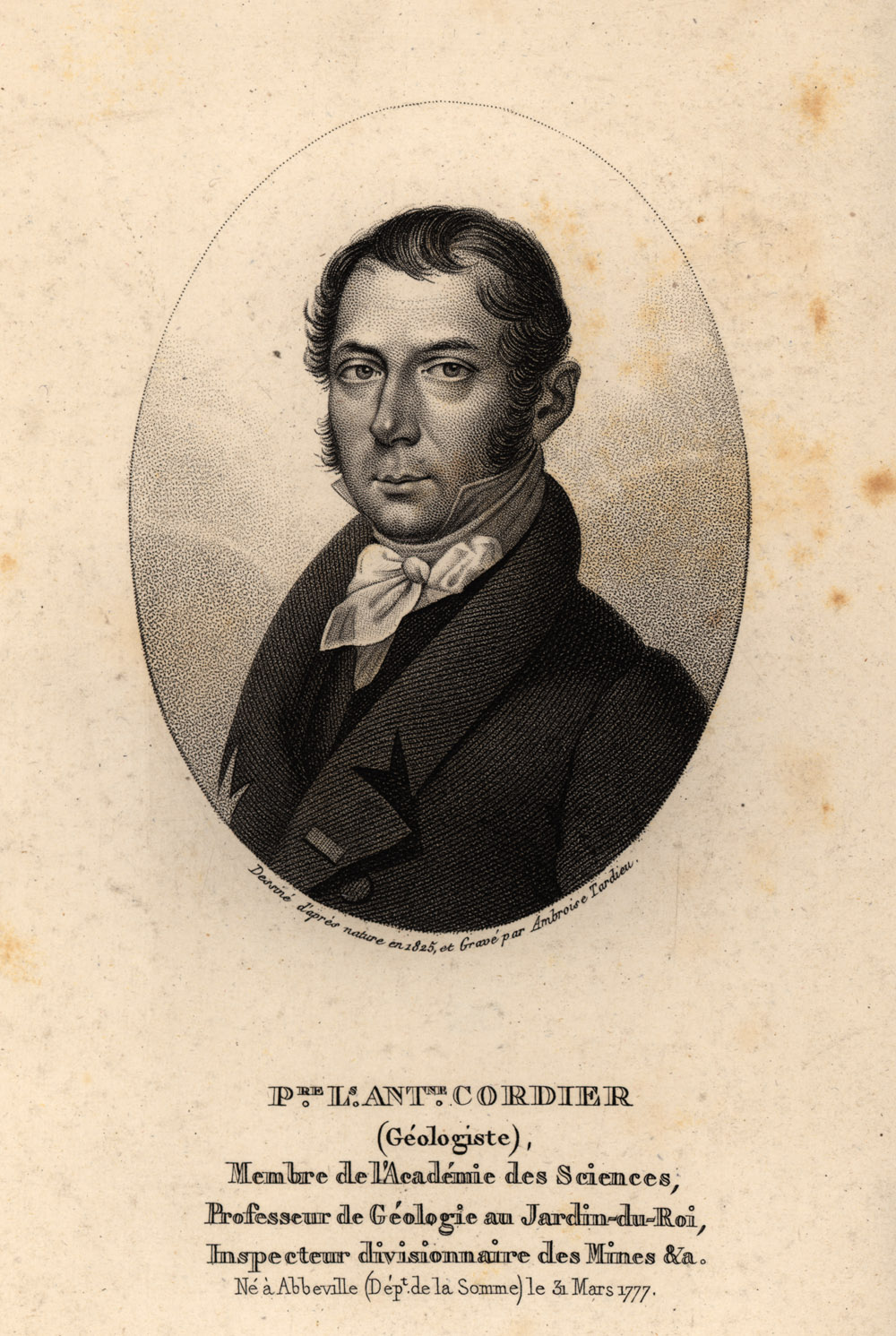
- Portrait by Ambroise Tardieu (1825)
- Born: 31 March 1777; Abbeville
- Died: 30 March 1861 (aged 83)
- Occupations: Geologist; Mineralogist
- Employer: Muséum national d'histoire naturelle

Pierre Louis Antoine Cordier (French pronunciation: [pjɛʁ lwi ɑ̃twan kɔʁdje]; 31 March 1777 – 30 March 1861) was a French geologist and mineralogist, and a founder of the French Geological Society. He was professor of geology at the Muséum national d'histoire naturelle in Paris from 1819 to 1861, and was responsible for the development of the geological gallery in the museum.

== Family ==
Cordier was born in Abbeville in 1777 to a family of English origin. In 1817 he married Cécile Borgella, a niece and pupil of Louis Ramond de Carbonnières. Together they had four sons and six daughters.

== Career ==
Cordier entered the École des mines in 1794 and followed the well-known courses of Louis Nicolas Vauquelin (1763–1829), René Just Haüy (1743–1822) and Déodat Gratet de Dolomieu (1750–1801).

He gained his "diplôme d'ingénieur" in 1797 and followed Dolomieu first on an expedition to the Alps, then as a scientist on Napoleon's expedition to Egypt from 1798 to 1799. Arriving in Alexandria, Cordier immediately began his researches into the country's mineralogy and geology, with particular focus on the formation of the Nile valley. On Dolomieu's taking ill, both of them attempted to return to France. Although Cordier was taken prisoner in Taranto, subsequently being transferred to Messina in Sicily, he was freed after three months in captivity as a result of Dolmieu's intervention and returned to France. In 1802 he published Mémoire sur le mercure argental, and in 1808 Description du dichtoïte, which revealed his deep interest in mineralogy. Cordier rose to the position of "ingénieur en chef" in 1809 and in 1816 he published his account of basalt: Sur les substances minérales dites en masse, qui servent de base aux roches volcaniques.

In 1822 he was elected to the French Académie des sciences. In 1830 he was appointed maître des requêtes in the Conseil d'État. In the same year he participitated in the foundation of the French Geological Society (the Société géologique de France). In 1832 he became inspector-general of mines in the south-west of France and in 1837, "conseiller d'État". He was made Commander of the Légion d'honneur in 1837, then Grand Officer in 1859; In 1839 he was made a Peer of France.

=== Muséum national d'histoire naturelle ===
Cordier started work at the Muséum national d'histoire naturelle in 1819, when he succeeded Barthélemy Faujas de Saint-Fond (1741–1819) to the chair of geology. Cordier held this position until his death in 1861.

He was appointed director of the museum three times (from 1824 to 1825, from 1832 to 1833, and from 1838 to 1839) and was responsible for the creation of the "Galerie de géologie" in the museum. During his stewardship the collection grew from 1,500 specimens in 1819 to 200,000 in 1861, the year of his death in Paris. He made 51 geological journeys during his life, collecting specimens from within France (the Pyrenees, Languedoc, Maine, the Ardennes, the Vosges, Saxony and the Auvergne) as well as Tuscany, Liguria and the Alps. Many of the rocks that formed part of the museum's collection were sent to him from various continents by colleagues and friends. By 1844 Cordier had classified 337 types of rock.

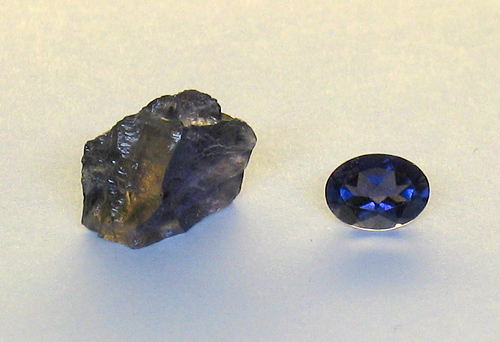
A rough specimen of cordierite, showing dichroism (left); a cut stone (right)

== Commemoration ==
Cordierite, a magnesium iron aluminium cyclosilicate, is named after him.

== Bibliography ==
- Bertand, M. J., 'Notice historique sur Pierre-Louis-Antoine Cordier, Inspecteur general des mines, Membre de l'Académie des Sciences', Annales des Mines, 9th series, vol. 27, 1895
