= Les Droites =

Mountain in the Mont Blanc massif in the French Alps

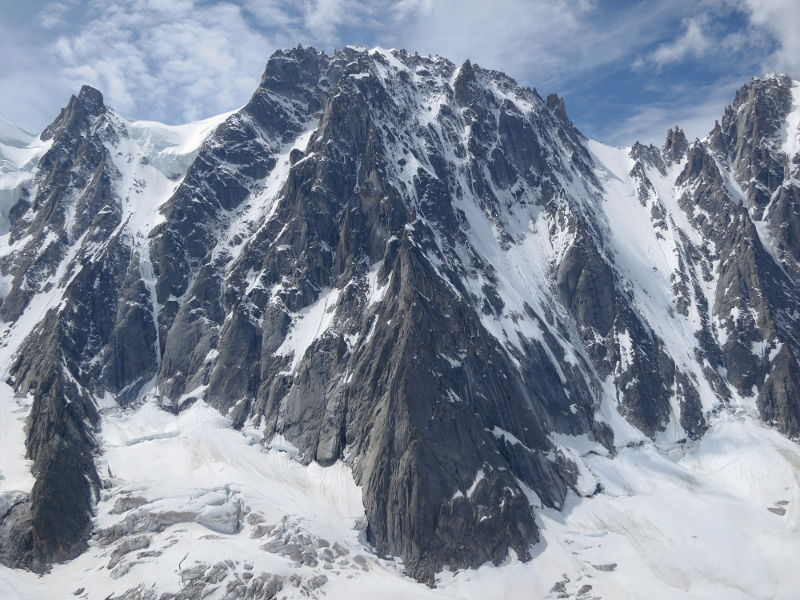
- The north side of Les Droites

Highest point
- Elevation: 4,000 m (13,123 ft)
- Prominence: 204 m (669 ft)
- Parent peak: Aiguille Verte
- Coordinates: 45°55′59″N 6°59′21″E

Geography
- Location within France
- Location: Haute-Savoie, France
- Parent range: Graian Alps

Geology
- Mountain type: Granite

Climbing
- First ascent: 7 August 1876 by Thomas Middlemore and John Oakley Maund with guides Henri Cordier, Johann Jaun and Andreas Maurer
- Easiest route: East ridge (Glacier approach, then rock climb, AD)

Les Droites (4,000 metres (13,123 ft)) is a mountain in the Mont Blanc massif in the French Alps and is the lowest of the 4000-metre peaks in the Alps. The mountain has two summits:

- West summit (3,984 m), first ascent by W. A. B. Coolidge, Christian Almer and Ulrich Almer on 16 July 1876
- East summit (4,000 m), first ascent by Thomas Middlemore and John Oakley Maund with Henri Cordier, Johann Jaun and Andreas Maurer on 7 August 1876

The north face of the mountain rises some 1,600 m from the Argentière basin at an average angle of 60°, and is the steepest face on the 10-km-long ridge that stretches from the Aiguille Verte to Mont Dolent. The first route to be made on it was via the central couloir on the north-east flank by Bobi Arsandaux and Jacques Lagarde on 31 July 1930. The north spur was first climbed in 1972 by French alpinist Nicolas Jaeger. The dangers of climbing this face were highlighted on an episode of the Discovery Channel documentary series I Shouldn't Be Alive.

== Huts ==
- Refuge d' Argentière (2,771 m)
- Refuge du Couvercle (2,687 m)

== See also ==
- List of 4000 metre peaks of the Alps
- List of mountains of the Alps above 3000 m
