= Schoppernau =

- Municipality
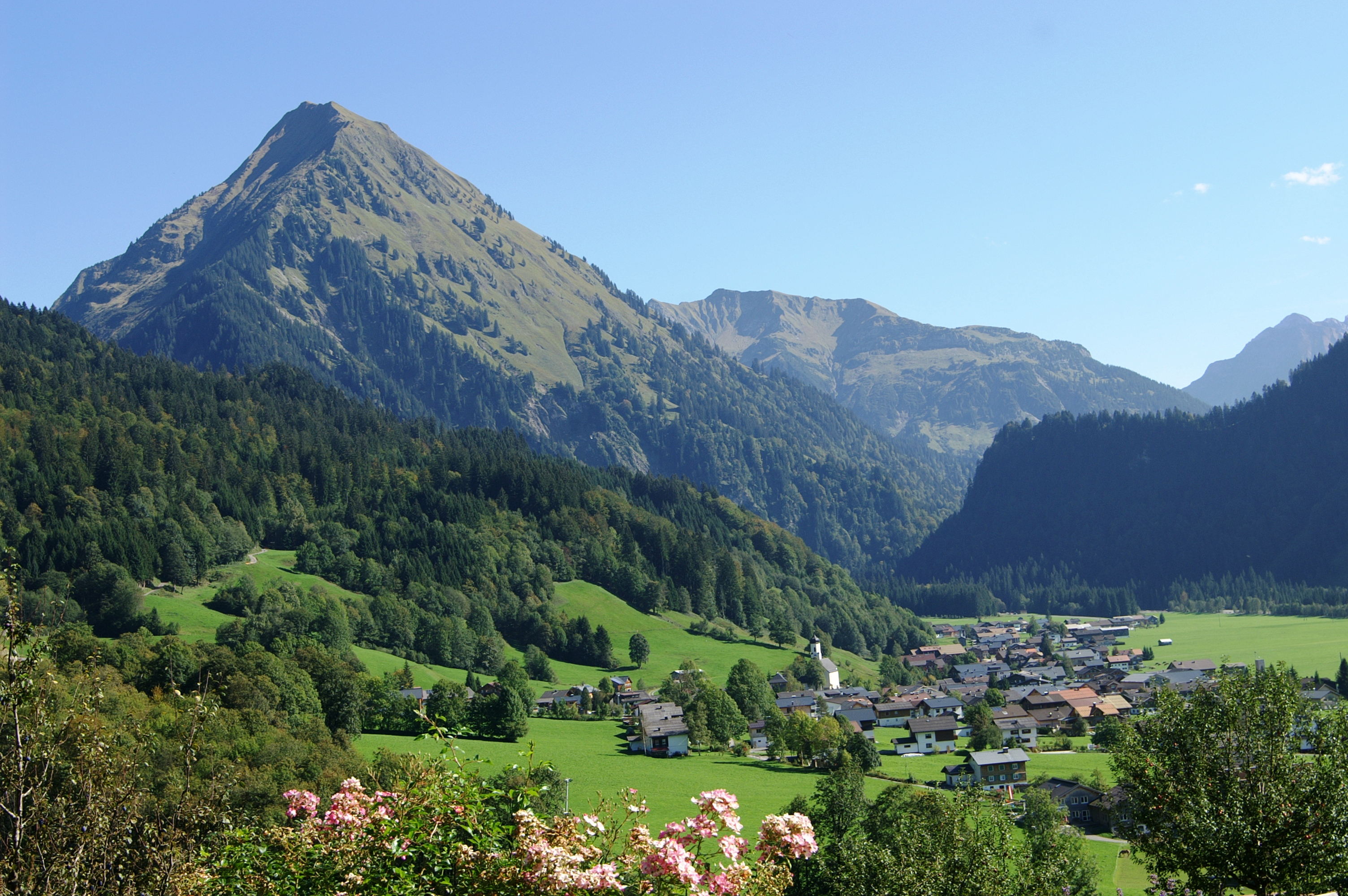

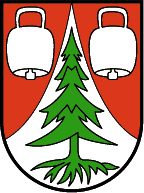
- Coat of arms

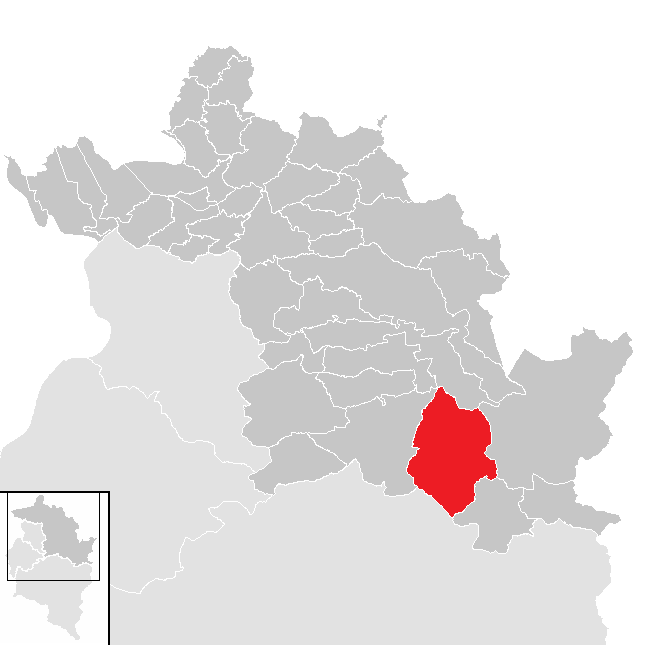
- Location in the district

- Location within Austria
- Coordinates: 47°18′48″N 10°01′03″E
- Country: Austria
- State: Vorarlberg
- District: Bregenz

Government
  - Mayor: Walter Beer

Area
  - Total: 47.64 km^{2} (18.39 sq mi)
- Elevation: 852 m (2,795 ft)

Population (2018-01-01)
  - Total: 950
  - Density: 20/km^{2} (52/sq mi)
- Time zone: UTC+1 (CET)
  - Summer (DST): UTC+2 (CEST)
- Postal code: 6886
- Area code: 05515
- Vehicle registration: B
- Website: www.au-schoppernau.at

Schoppernau is a town in the Bregenzerwald Region (Bregenz district) of the Austrian state of Vorarlberg. Schoppernau has an area of 47.64 km^{2}.

== Population ==
Historical population
| Year | Pop. | ±% |
|---|---|---|
| 1869 | 486 | — |
| 1880 | 456 | −6.2% |
| 1890 | 445 | −2.4% |
| 1900 | 504 | +13.3% |
| 1910 | 601 | +19.2% |
| 1923 | 541 | −10.0% |
| 1934 | 535 | −1.1% |
| 1939 | 531 | −0.7% |
| 1951 | 712 | +34.1% |
| 1961 | 662 | −7.0% |
| 1971 | 785 | +18.6% |
| 1981 | 885 | +12.7% |
| 1991 | 897 | +1.4% |
| 2001 | 905 | +0.9% |
| 2011 | 923 | +2.0% |

== History ==
Until the 10th century, Schoppernau seems to have been pristine forest. Schoppernau and Au were the last villages to be settled in the Bregenzerwald. Early on, the land in and around Schoppernau was probably used primarily as pastureland for sheep. The surrounding terrain was probably used as pastureland for sheep, as the name ("Schappernouw" = Schafau = sheep meadow or mead) indicates. The neighboring village of Au showed similar developments.

=== Coat of arms ===
The Schoppernau coat of arms has been in use since 12 March 1930. It is red with a bronze frame, showing a silver mountain summit in the background. In the middle there is a green uprooted spruce, with two silver cow bells to the left and right.

== Culture ==
Schoppernau is part of the Bregenzerwald Umgang (literally "Bregenzerwald Walking Tour"). This walking tour offers insights into the architecture and community planning of 12 traditional villages in the Bregenzerwald. While walking over various landscapes, visiting public buildings, homes and everyday objects, walkers gain a comprehensive overview of typical Bregenzerwald architectural styles as they developed throughout the ages. The nine buildings chosen for the walking tour in Schoppernau include the Alpine Cheese Dairy (Bergkäserei), several farmhouses, an old sawmill, the fire department, and the primary school.

The 19th century half-timbered farmhouses in Schoppernau present many typical features of the unique Bregenzerwald farm architecture, particularly their joined timber beams sealed with moss.

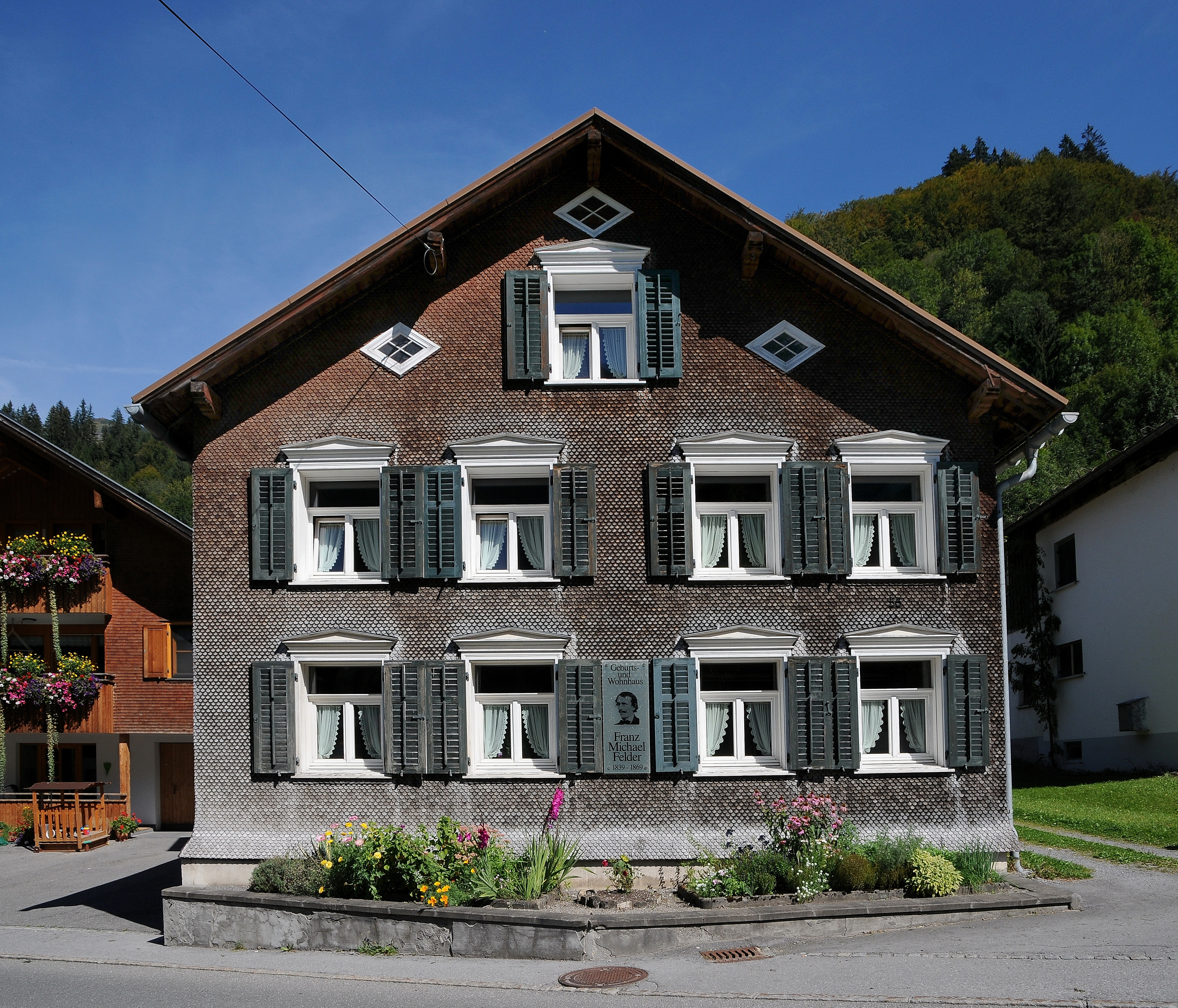
Franz Michael Felder's birth place in Schoppernau

Exhibits in the Franz Michael Felder Museum present the life, times and work of Franz Michael Felder, author, farmer and social reformer, one of the most prominent historical personalities of the Bregenzerwald.

The parish church Schoppernau was built in 1710 by the architect Johann Brenner von Gräsalp (1664-1749). In 1838, an organ was installed. In 1917, all four church bells were taken down and their metal was used in the war effort World War I.

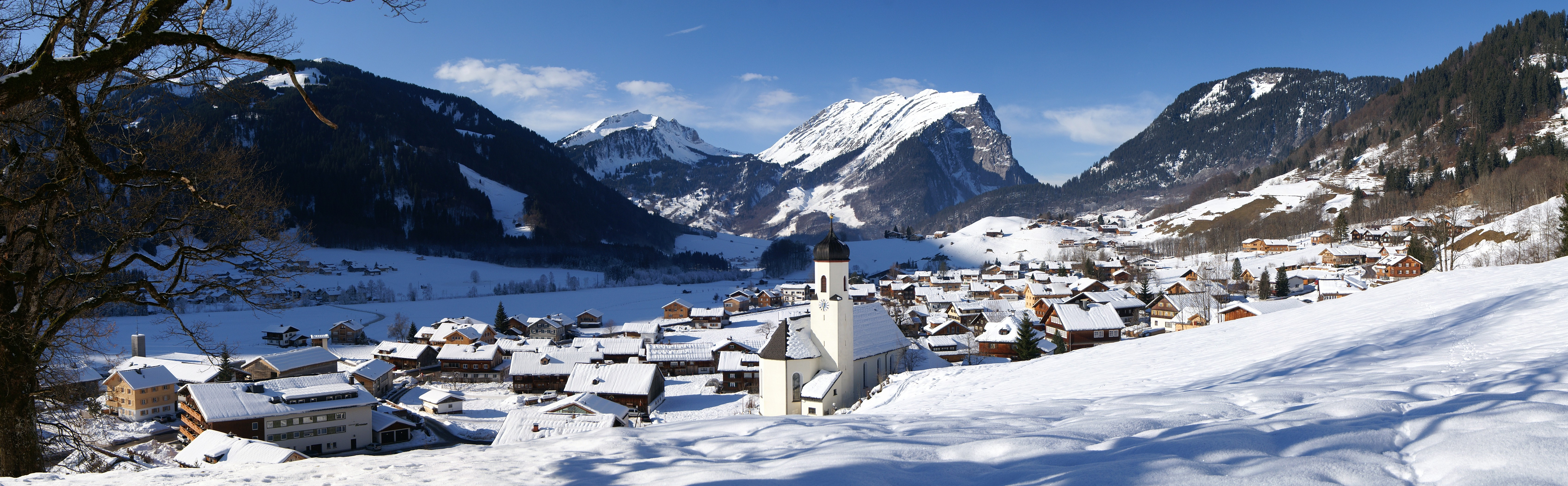
Panoramic view of Schoppernau

== Climate ==
Climate data for Schoppernau (1981–2010)
| Month | Jan | Feb | Mar | Apr | May | Jun | Jul | Aug | Sep | Oct | Nov | Dec | Year |
|---|---|---|---|---|---|---|---|---|---|---|---|---|---|
| Record high °C (°F) | 16.0 (60.8) | 17.5 (63.5) | 21.7 (71.1) | 24.5 (76.1) | 29.9 (85.8) | 32.6 (90.7) | 34.0 (93.2) | 33.4 (92.1) | 29.3 (84.7) | 25.3 (77.5) | 23.1 (73.6) | 19.2 (66.6) | 34.0 (93.2) |
| Mean daily maximum °C (°F) | 0.5 (32.9) | 3.1 (37.6) | 7.6 (45.7) | 12.0 (53.6) | 17.4 (63.3) | 20.0 (68.0) | 22.3 (72.1) | 21.6 (70.9) | 17.8 (64.0) | 13.5 (56.3) | 5.8 (42.4) | 1.2 (34.2) | 11.9 (53.4) |
| Daily mean °C (°F) | −4.1 (24.6) | −2.9 (26.8) | 1.0 (33.8) | 5.1 (41.2) | 10.6 (51.1) | 13.8 (56.8) | 15.8 (60.4) | 14.9 (58.8) | 11.2 (52.2) | 7.1 (44.8) | 0.9 (33.6) | −2.8 (27.0) | 5.9 (42.6) |
| Mean daily minimum °C (°F) | −7.7 (18.1) | −7.0 (19.4) | −3.2 (26.2) | 0.5 (32.9) | 4.9 (40.8) | 8.2 (46.8) | 10.3 (50.5) | 10.0 (50.0) | 7.0 (44.6) | 3.2 (37.8) | −2.4 (27.7) | −6.0 (21.2) | 1.5 (34.7) |
| Record low °C (°F) | −28.0 (−18.4) | −23.8 (−10.8) | −23.3 (−9.9) | −10.6 (12.9) | −4.9 (23.2) | −1.0 (30.2) | 1.5 (34.7) | 1.6 (34.9) | −2.2 (28.0) | −11.5 (11.3) | −19.8 (−3.6) | −21.0 (−5.8) | −28.0 (−18.4) |
| Average precipitation mm (inches) | 135 (5.3) | 126 (5.0) | 161 (6.3) | 134 (5.3) | 172 (6.8) | 225 (8.9) | 265 (10.4) | 251 (9.9) | 175 (6.9) | 126 (5.0) | 149 (5.9) | 153 (6.0) | 2,073 (81.6) |
| Average snowfall cm (inches) | 93 (37) | 88 (35) | 84 (33) | 39 (15) | 5 (2.0) | 1 (0.4) | 0 (0) | 0 (0) | 0 (0) | 6 (2.4) | 54 (21) | 90 (35) | 459 (181) |
| Average relative humidity (%) (at 14:00) | 82.3 | 69.3 | 58.9 | 52.1 | 53.7 | 56.6 | 57.9 | 59.1 | 60.6 | 64.0 | 79.4 | 85.6 | 65.0 |
Source: Central Institute for Meteorology and Geodynamics

Climate data for Schoppernau (1971–2000)
| Month | Jan | Feb | Mar | Apr | May | Jun | Jul | Aug | Sep | Oct | Nov | Dec | Year |
|---|---|---|---|---|---|---|---|---|---|---|---|---|---|
| Record high °C (°F) | 16.0 (60.8) | 17.5 (63.5) | 21.7 (71.1) | 24.0 (75.2) | 28.0 (82.4) | 31.6 (88.9) | 34.0 (93.2) | 32.3 (90.1) | 29.6 (85.3) | 25.3 (77.5) | 23.1 (73.6) | 19.2 (66.6) | 34.0 (93.2) |
| Mean daily maximum °C (°F) | 0.8 (33.4) | 3.3 (37.9) | 7.4 (45.3) | 11.0 (51.8) | 16.7 (62.1) | 19.0 (66.2) | 21.4 (70.5) | 21.1 (70.0) | 17.8 (64.0) | 13.1 (55.6) | 5.4 (41.7) | 1.4 (34.5) | 11.5 (52.7) |
| Daily mean °C (°F) | −3.8 (25.2) | −2.6 (27.3) | 1.0 (33.8) | 4.4 (39.9) | 10.1 (50.2) | 12.9 (55.2) | 15.2 (59.4) | 14.6 (58.3) | 11.1 (52.0) | 6.7 (44.1) | 0.6 (33.1) | −2.6 (27.3) | 5.6 (42.1) |
| Mean daily minimum °C (°F) | −7.3 (18.9) | −6.6 (20.1) | −3.2 (26.2) | −0.1 (31.8) | 4.4 (39.9) | 7.5 (45.5) | 9.8 (49.6) | 9.7 (49.5) | 6.7 (44.1) | 2.7 (36.9) | −2.8 (27.0) | −5.9 (21.4) | 1.2 (34.2) |
| Record low °C (°F) | −28.0 (−18.4) | −23.8 (−10.8) | −24.2 (−11.6) | −12.0 (10.4) | −7.0 (19.4) | −1.0 (30.2) | 1.5 (34.7) | 0.2 (32.4) | −2.4 (27.7) | −9.1 (15.6) | −19.8 (−3.6) | −24.4 (−11.9) | −28.0 (−18.4) |
| Average precipitation mm (inches) | 129.8 (5.11) | 114.9 (4.52) | 137.5 (5.41) | 133.6 (5.26) | 148.2 (5.83) | 223.2 (8.79) | 247.4 (9.74) | 211.8 (8.34) | 152.3 (6.00) | 120.7 (4.75) | 145.6 (5.73) | 143.1 (5.63) | 1,908.1 (75.12) |
| Average snowfall cm (inches) | 96.7 (38.1) | 83.7 (33.0) | 90.5 (35.6) | 42.8 (16.9) | 5.9 (2.3) | 0.5 (0.2) | 0.0 (0.0) | 0.0 (0.0) | 0.1 (0.0) | 5.9 (2.3) | 54.9 (21.6) | 101.2 (39.8) | 482.2 (189.8) |
| Average precipitation days (≥ 1.0 mm) | 12.3 | 11.0 | 13.4 | 13.5 | 14.5 | 16.9 | 16.2 | 15.8 | 12.4 | 11.0 | 12.2 | 12.9 | 162.1 |
| Average relative humidity (%) (at 14:00) | 80.4 | 69.6 | 58.8 | 54.4 | 54.6 | 57.3 | 58.0 | 58.4 | 59.4 | 64.0 | 78.2 | 83.2 | 64.7 |
Source: Central Institute for Meteorology and Geodynamics

== Trivia ==
In Vorarlberg, Austria, Schoppernau is known for the song "Vo Mello bis ge Schoppornou" (Alemannic: From Mellau to Schoppernau), by the Bregenzerwälder band Holstuonarmusigbigbandclub.

== Personalities ==
- Franz Michael Felder (1839–1869)
- Walter Strolz (born 1927)

== See also ==
- Horizon Field
