= Au, Vorarlberg =

Au
- Municipality
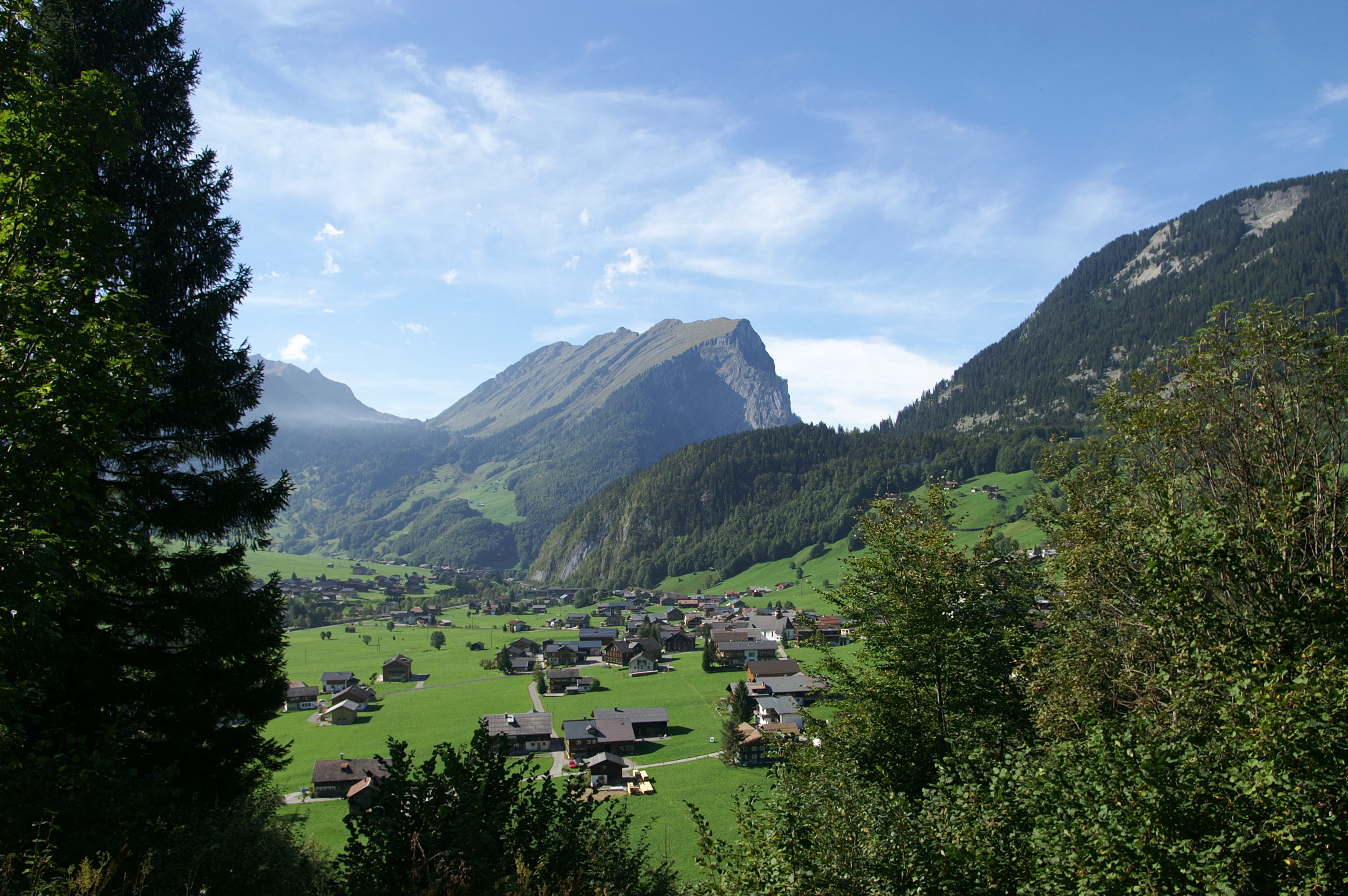

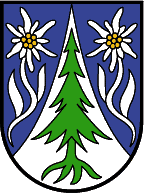
- Coat of arms

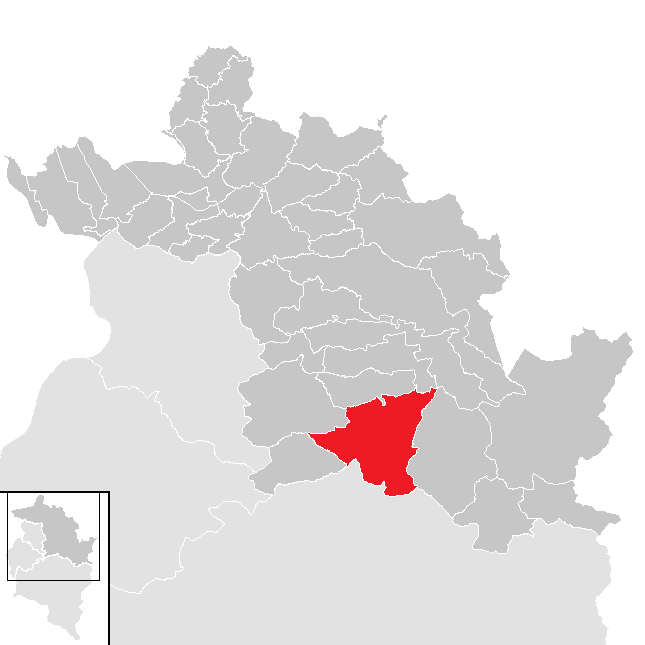
- Location in the district

- Location within Austria
- Coordinates: 47°19′00″N 09°59′00″E
- Country: Austria
- State: Vorarlberg
- District: Bregenz

Government
  - Mayor: Ing. Andreas Simma (Auer Liste)

Area
  - Total: 44.91 km^{2} (17.34 sq mi)
- Elevation: 800 m (2,600 ft)

Population (2018-01-01)
  - Total: 1,736
  - Density: 38.66/km^{2} (100.1/sq mi)
- Time zone: UTC+1 (CET)
  - Summer (DST): UTC+2 (CEST)
- Postal code: 6883
- Area code: 05515
- Vehicle registration: B
- Website: www.au-schoppernau.at

Au (German pronunciation: [aʊ]; Alemannic German: Ou) is a town in the Bregenz Forest in Vorarlberg (Austria).

== Geography ==
The town belongs to the Bregenz Forest, is part of the district of Bregenz, and lies in the Upper Bregenz Forst.

40 percent of its 45 km^{2} area is covered with forest, 34.4% of the area is used as alpine pasture (Almwirtschaft) and for other forms of alpine agriculture.

The town itself is unlike most others in the area, as it has no real center. Au is an example of a scattered village (German: Streudorf). It consists of several districts: Am Stein, Argenau, Argenstein, Argenzipfel, Jaghausen, Kreuzgasse, Lebernau, Lugen, Lisse, Rehmen, Schrecken, and Wieden.

The town hall is located in Argenau, but the parish church is located in Jaghausen. The district of Rehmen also has its own church.

The river Bregenzer Ach, the largest river in the region, flows through Au and divides it into two parts: The one part is called Schattseite (meaning “shady side”), and consists of the districts of Argenau, Argenzipfel and Wieden; the other part is called Sonnseite (meaning “sunny side”) and consists (mainly) of Rehmen and Schrecken. Alongside the river runs the L200 road, which is the main route through the Bregenz Forest.

=== History ===
The name "Au" likely derives from the Old High German word ouwa, meaning "river meadow" or "floodplain," referencing the area's proximity to rivers and streams.

The first known inhabitants of the Au region were the Alemanni, primarily from the Vorarlberg Rhine Valley or the Bregenz area. Permanent settlement likely began between 1200 and 1300, as a chapel was consecrated in Jaghausen in 1372. The land comprising the modern municipality was originally owned by King Rudolf of Habsburg, who later ceded it to the Counts of Bregenz-Montfort. The Counts of Feldkirch-Montfort inherited the area and used it primarily for hunting. During this period, the name ‘Jaghausen in den Owen’ originated, reflecting the counts' construction of a hunting lodge there. In 1375, Count Hugo von Montfort sold the area to Further Austria.

Au became a center of the Au guild, a group instrumental in shaping Baroque architecture in southern Germany, Switzerland, and Alsace. The Thumb and Beer families of master builders, based in Au, developed the Baroque Vorarlberg cathedral style in the 17th century.

From 1805 to 1814, Au was part of the Kingdom of Bavaria, before being returned to the Austrian Empire. Since 1861, Au has belonged to the province of Vorarlberg.

Following World War II, Au fell within the French Occupation Zone of Austria, where the occupation, including Moroccan soldiers serving in the French army, lasted until the signing of the Austrian State Treaty in 1955.

== Population ==
Historical population
Year	Pop.	±%
1869	1,039	—
1880	1,060	+2.0%
1890	1,067	+0.7%
1900	1,116	+4.6%
1910	1,210	+8.4%
1923	1,080	−10.7%
1934	1,269	+17.5%
1939	1,263	−0.5%
1951	1,414	+12.0%
1961	1,440	+1.8%
1971	1,476	+2.5%
1981	1,466	−0.7%
1991	1,572	+7.2%
2001	1,643	+4.5%
2011	1,692	+3.0%
2017	1,728	+2.1%

== Politics ==
The town council of Au, called Gemeinderat, consists of 18 members, all of them members of the Auer Liste. The current mayor is Andreas Simma.

== Culture ==
In 1651, the Auer Zunft (Guild of Au) was founded in Au by Michael Beer. It is an association of builders, sculptors and carpenters. In Au-Schoppernau from 1670 to 1700, more than 90 percent of all male workers were builders. Master builders and craftsmen from the Bregenz Forest in particular, but also from other parts of today's Vorarlberg, played a leading role in the 600 churches and monasteries that were built in the Baroque style in the 17th and 18th centuries. Members of the Guild of Au received 60 percent of the more than 700 major construction contracts awarded to Vorarlbergers.

Many important members of the Guild of Au came from the architect families Beer, Moosbrugger and Thumb.

In 2021, the Museum of Baroque Master Builders was opened in Au. It is dedicated to the works of the Guild of Au.

== Economics and infrastructure ==
A main economic factor in Au is tourism. Many private households rent out rooms or flats. There are several hotels, many of them providing special venues or events, e.g. wellness, sports, and motorbiking. Agriculture was formerly the main income source for the village, until the rise of tourism.

== Transportation ==
Au is situated on the L200, the Bregenzerwald Bundesstraße. Here it connects to the L193, the Faschina Bundesstraße, which is the main route to the skiing resort of Damüls. Public transportation consists of the Postbus Line 40, running from Dornbirn to Schoppernau. In winter there is also a free bus service running through the town for skiers and locals.

== Education ==
There is a kindergarten, a Volksschule (primary school), and a Hauptschule (lower secondary school), all located in a building in the district Schrecken. The secondary school also serves the towns of Schnepfau, Schoppernau, Damüls and Schröcken.

== Personalities ==
- Kaspar Moosbrugger (Vorarlberg School; * May 16, 1656, in Au; † August 26, 1723, in Einsiedeln)
- Franz Beer (master builder and co-founder of Vorarlberg School; * April 1, 1660, in Au (Vorarlberg); † January 21, 1726, in Bezau)
- Jan Zwischenbrugger (professional footballer; * June 16, 1990, in Au, more than 200 league appearances for Rheindorf Altach)

== See also ==
- Vorarlberg School
