= Pierre Gaspard (mountaineer) =

French mountain climber

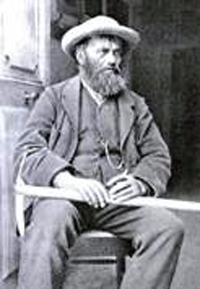
- Pierre Gaspard

Personal information
- Born: 27 March 1834 Saint-Christophe-en-Oisans, France
- Died: 16 January 1915 (aged 80) Saint-Christophe-en-Oisans, France
- Years active: 1876–1913

Sport
- Sport: Mountaineering

Pierre Gaspard (27 March 1834, in Saint-Christophe-en-Oisans – 16 January 1915, in Saint-Christophe-en-Oisans) was a French mountain climber, one of the greatest mountain guides in the silver age of alpinism. He made the first ascent of La Meije (Massif des Écrins) on 16 August 1877 with his son and Emmanuel Boileau de Castelnau. Their ascent followed the south buttress Arête du Promontoire, which became the "normal route".

== Biography ==
Pierre Gaspard's father, Hugues Gaspard, came from the small village of Saint-Georges d'Entraunes in the former department of Var (department) in Provence. He was a shepherd, who spent each summer with the sheep on the long trip to the Alpine pastures in the Vénéon valley in the Dauphiné. In September 1832, he married an inhabitant of the village of Saint-Christophe-en-Oisans, in the Dauphiné Alps, and settled in the village permanently. His son was born in the village, in the heart of the Pelvoux Massif, in 1837.

Pierre Gaspard took over his father's farm, which consisted of several sections of the field and a flock of sheep. In his spare time he enjoyed hunting chamois. He was a rugged and fearless man who knew the mountains beautifully. He became familiar with the entire upper part of the valley surrounding Vénéon, from Olan and Les Bans on the south to Ailefroide and Barre des Écrins in the east to La Meije in the north. He had climbing ability and knowledge of the details of topography of the area, including the configuration of the glaciers.

Already by the end of the 1860s he led tourists on trips to the mountains. In 1873, he scaled the ice pass of Col de la Lauze (3,512 metres (11,522 ft)). In 1874, he climbed the Barre des Écrins. The following year, with the support of W. A. B. Coolidge, the Dauphiné Tourists Association (Société des Touristes du Dauphiné) turned to him for help in setting up the organization of the alpine guides.

As a guide, Gaspard's two most important customers were Emmanuel Boileau de Castelnau and Henry Duhamel. A turning point for Gaspard was his first meeting with Boileau de Castelnau in 1876. The Huguenot nobleman of Languedoc liked the modest mountaineer so much that he greatly extended his stay in the mountains. With Boileau de Castelnau, Gaspard formed one of the most brilliant ropes of their era, making a dozen first ascents in the 1876 and 1877 seasons. By hunting for chamois, Gaspard became aware of a number of routes to less prominent peaks and passes. On 21 July 1877, Gaspard and Boileau de Castelnau made the first ascent of the Dôme de Neige (4,015 metres (13,173 ft)) in the Massif des Écrins Barre.

Less than four weeks later (16 August 1877), climbing with Gaspard's son (Pierre Gaspard fils), they conquered the last of the great, difficult, and yet unclimbed peaks of the Alps - the Grand Pic de la Meije (3,983 metres (13,068 ft)). On 4 August 1877, Boileau de Castelnau and Gaspard tried a new ascent of the Meije by the south side, a route attempted the previous year by Henry Duhamel. With difficulty and thanks to Gaspard's audacity, they came to the end of the wall that Duhamel thought impassable, both climbing with bare feet. Forced to abandon it due to lack of time, they left a fixed rope in place. On August 16, Boileau de Castelnau, Gaspard and his son reached the top, not without difficulty: the Meije was defeated. The descent was even more challenging than the ascent, and they were obliged to bivouac on the night of August 16 on an uncomfortable ledge, but managed to return to La Grave the following day.

Gaspard immediately became famous, and was therefore very much in demand to the extent that it was necessary to retain him in advance. In the following years he devoted himself mainly to the guiding profession, guiding more than thirty of the first parties to climb the Écrins mountains. Of the first ten parties to climb La Meije, he led six. With Duhamel, besides the ascent of Pic Gaspard in 1878, he opened in 1880 a route on the south face of the Barre des Écrins from La Bérarde and the following year a new route on the southeast side of the Aiguille du Plat de la Selle. In 1885 Gaspard opened a new route to the Meije by the edge of the Brêche. Popularly known as "père Gaspard", he remained a mountain guide until an advanced age, guiding a party to La Meije at the age of 76. He guided his last party at the age of 80. He died a few months later. He was buried in the small cemetery in his native village, surrounded by mountains.

In his own lifetime Pierre Gaspard was called "King of the Alps". He left 15 children, including six sons (Maximin, Pierre, Casimir, Joseph, Alexandre, Devouassoud), who were also mountain guides.

== Ascents ==
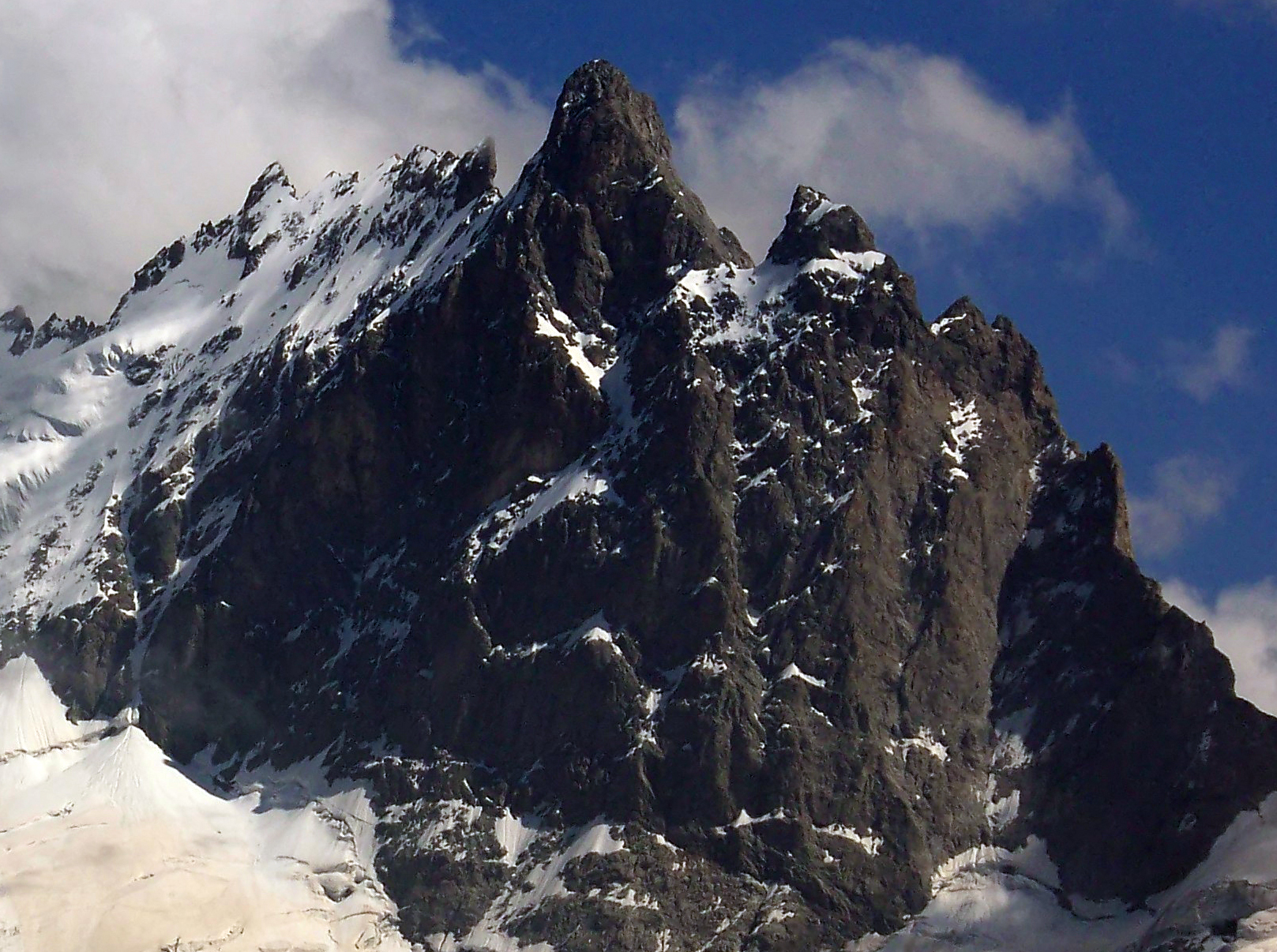
Grand Pic of the Meije

- 1876 - Tête des Fétoules, 19 August
- 1876 - Tête de l'Étret, 4 September
- 1876 - Pic Nord des Cavales (3,362 metres (11,030 ft)), 10 September
- 1877 - Dôme de Neige des Écrins, 21 July
- 1877 - Tête du Rouget, Petit Pelvoux (3,753 metres (12,313 ft))
- 1877 - Grand Pic of La Meije, 16 August
- 1878 - Pointe du Vallon des Étages, 27 June
- 1878 - Pic Gaspard (3,883 metres (12,740 ft)), 6 July
- 1880 - North summit of the Olan (3,564 metres (11,693 ft)), 8 August
- 1889 - L'Ailefroide Centrale (3,928 metres (12,887 ft)), southeast face, 8 August
- 1891 - Summit of Pelvoux by the northwest face of Pointe Durand (3,946 metres (12,946 ft)), 10 July
- 1891 - West summit of Pic des Souffles (3,098 metres (10,164 ft))

== Bibliography ==
- Bordes, Gérard (1976). Grande Encyclopédie de la Montagne (in French). Vol. 4. Paris: Éditions Atlas.
- Gaspard de la Meije, novel by Isabelle Scheibli

== Film ==
- Gaspard de la Meije
