= Emmanuel Boileau de Castelnau =

French alpinist and sportsman

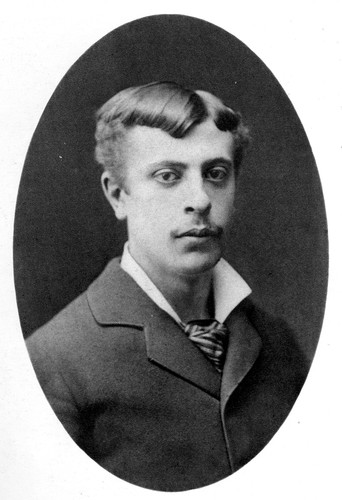
Emmanuel Boileau de Castelnau, ca. 1880

Jules Henri Emmanuel Boileau, baron de Castelnau (French pronunciation: [ʒyl ɑ̃ʁi emanɥɛl bwalo baʁɔ̃ də kastɛlno]; 1857-1923) was a French alpinist and sportsman who took part in the first ascent of the Meije. After his career as an alpinist he competed as an amateur cyclist.

== Biography ==
Boileau de Castelnau was born in Nîmes in 1857. He was sickly as a child.

=== Alpine career ===
He began mountain climbing in the Pyrenees at the age of thirteen, climbing Maladeta and Aneto. Between 1872 and 1874, he climbed Mont Blanc four times, as well as climbing the Matterhorn, the Jungfrau, and many other mountains. At seventeen, he joined the Club alpin français (French Alpine Club) founded the previous year.

In 1874, Boileau de Castelnau traveled to Chamonix to climb Mont Blanc. Forced to descend by a storm, he made the acquaintance back in Chamonix of Henry Duhamel, creator of the French Alpine Club and Haut-Dauphiné specialist. Boileau de Castelnau told Duhamel of his desire to achieve the ascent of the Grand Pic de la Meije. Tired of the bad weather that prevailed in Chamonix, the following year the two men engaged three guides in the valley and went to La Grave and the "rocher de l'aigle" ("rock of the eagle") to bivouac. The company was tempted by the north face with the three guides (Alexandre Tournier, François and Léon Simond) but the expedition was blocked by an overly dangerous passage in a corridor formed of black ice and sleet. That year they reached the central peak of the Meije (3,973 metres (13,035 ft)), conquered by W. A. B. Coolidge five years earlier.

Later, in Grenoble, Boileau de Castelnau met the President of the Société des touristes du Dauphiné, and in 1876 met the guide Pierre Gaspard and his son. They formed one of the most brilliant ropes of their era, quickly achieving many first ascents in the 1876 and 1877 seasons. On 4 August 1877, Boileau de Castelnau and Gaspard tried a new ascent of the Meije by the south side, a route attempted the previous year by Henry Duhamel. With difficulty and thanks to Gaspard's audacity, they came to the end of the wall that Duhamel thought impassable, both climbing with bare feet. Forced to abandon it due to lack of time, they left a fixed rope in place. On 16 August, Boileau de Castelnau, Gaspard and his son reached the top, not without difficulty: the Meije was defeated. The descent was even more challenging than the ascent and they were obliged to bivouac, on the night of 16 August, on an uncomfortable ledge but managed to return to La Grave the following day. W. A. B. Coolidge, who had hoped to be the first to climb the Meije, initially refused to believe that the relatively unknown Boileau de Castelnau had climbed it. Coolidge himself climbed the Meije by Boileau de Castelnau's route in July 1878 to confirm his account.

The Alpine career of the very young Boileau de Castelnau, interrupted by military service the following year, finally ended in 1879.

=== Post-alpine career ===
He subsequently devoted himself to managing his estates in Languedoc near Montpellier. He joined a foot-racing team and won the Mile Race in Germany. He attended the Faculty of Medicine in Paris, but did not write a thesis or practice medicine. In later years he became interested in bicycling (finishing second in the Paris-Tours race of 1898), driving motorcars (befriending Armand Peugeot, among other manufacturers, and finishing fifth in the first Tour de France Automobile), and flying balloons and airplanes.

=== Family and death ===
Boileau de Castelnau was married with a son and three daughters. He died at his home in Montpellier in 1923 at the age of 65.

== Ascents ==
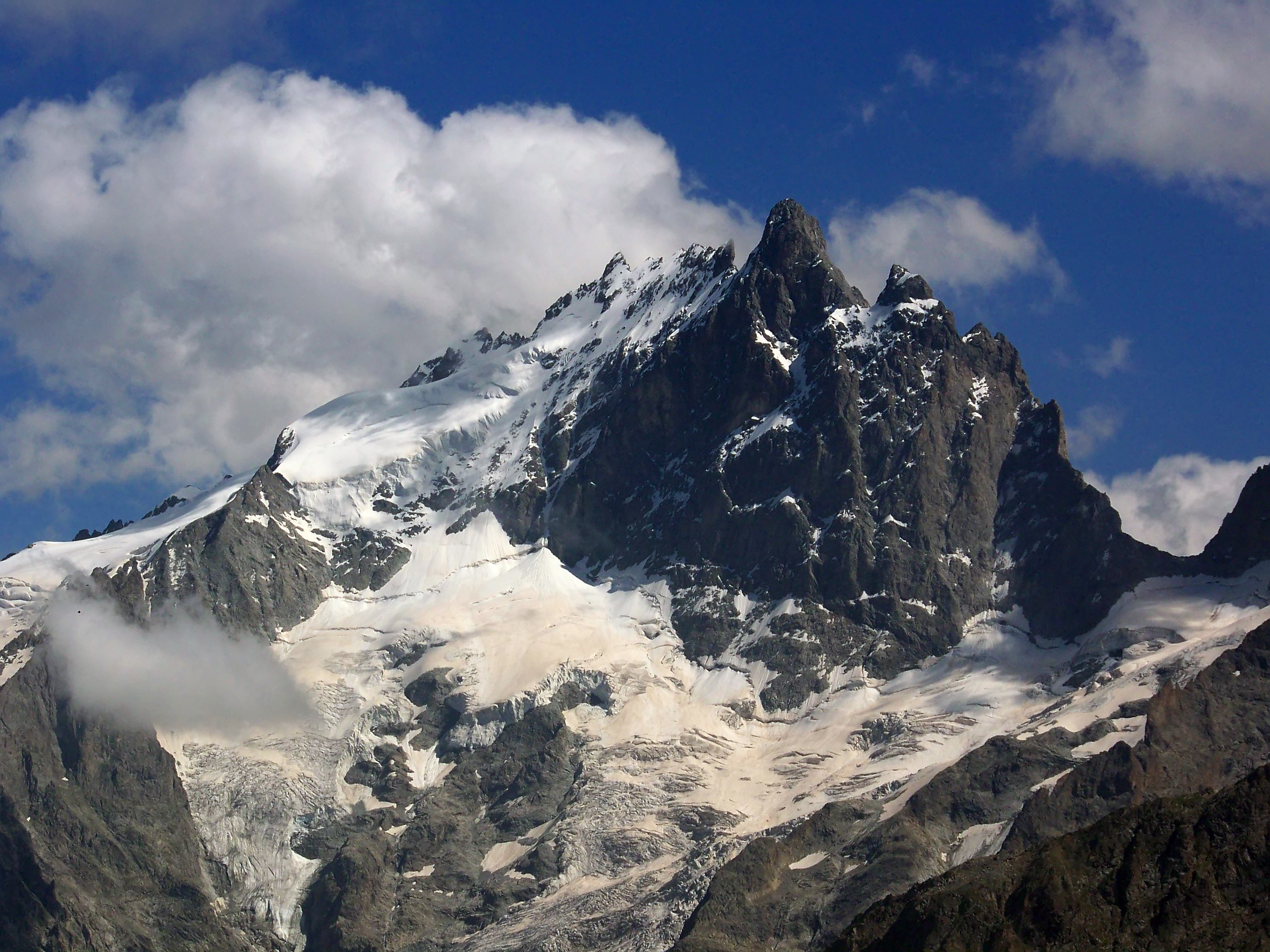
Grand Pic of the Meije

- 1875 - First ascent of the Tête des Corridors (3,734 metres (12,251 ft)), 21 August
- 1875 - Pic Central of the Meije (3,973 metres (13,035 ft))
- 1876 - First ascent of the Tête des Fétoules, 29 August
- 1876 - First ascent of the aiguille d'Olan (3,360 metres (11,020 ft)), 2 September
- 1876 - First ascent of the Tête de l'Étret, 4 September
- 1876 - First ascent of the Pic Nord des Cavales (3,362 metres (11,030 ft)), 10 September
- 1876 - First ascent of the Tête du Graou (3,168 metres (10,394 ft)), 18 September
- 1877 - First ascent of the Dôme de Neige des Écrins (3,980 metres (13,060 ft)), 21 July
- 1877 - First ascent of the Tête du Rouget (3,421 metres (11,224 ft)), 23 July
- 1877 - First ascent of the Petit Pelvoux (3,762 metres (12,343 ft))
- 1877 - First ascent of the Grand Pic de La Meije (3,983 metres (13,068 ft)), 16 August

== Bibliography ==
- J. J. (1878). "Première Ascension du Grand Pic de la Meije (3987 m.) par M. E. Boileau de Castelnau". Annuaire de la Société des Touristes du Dauphiné. Troisiéme Année. 1877 (in French). 3. Grenoble: 92–96.
- Bordes, Gérard (1976). Grande Encyclopédie de la Montagne (in French). Vol. 2. Paris: Éditions Atlas.
- Isselin, Henri. La Meije (in French). Editions Arthaud.
- Scheibli, Isabelle (2005-01-26). Le roman de Gaspard de la Meije (in French). Editions Glénat. ISBN 9782723448000.
