= Pic Gaspard =

Mountain in the French Alps

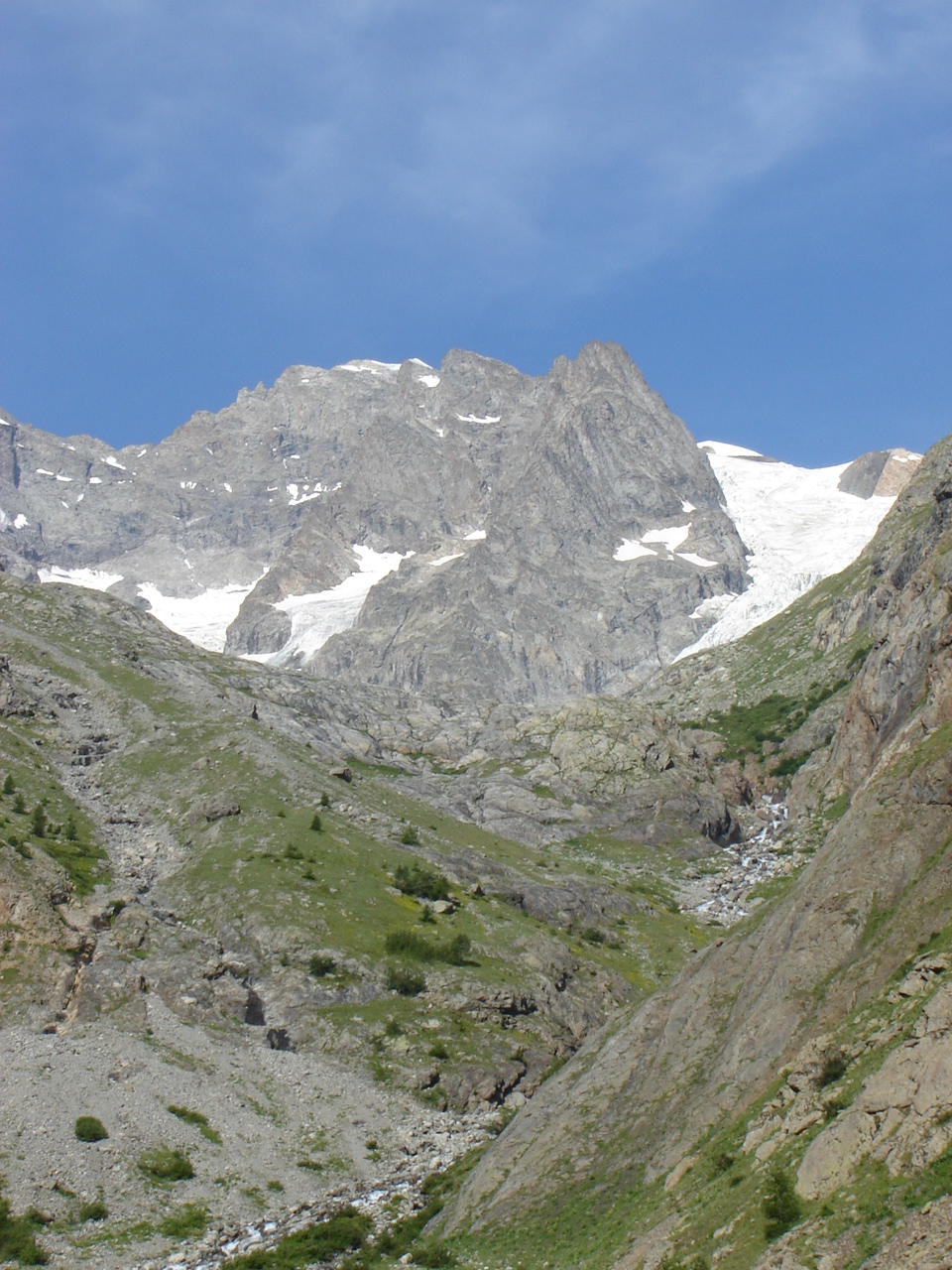

Highest point
- Elevation: 3,883 m (12,740 ft)
- Prominence: 208.9 m (685 ft)
- Coordinates: 44°59′54″N 6°19′51″E

Geography
- Location within France
- Location: Hautes-Alpes, France
- Parent range: Massif des Écrins

Climbing
- First ascent: 6 July 1878 by Henry Duhamel with Pierre Gaspard father and son, and Christophe Roderon
- Easiest route: Versant E (PD)

Pic Gaspard (3,883 m) is a mountain in the French Alps, one of the tallest in the Massif des Écrins. It was named in honor of the celebrated L'Oisans guide Pierre Gaspard, conqueror of La Meije on 16 August 1877 in the company of Emmanuel Boileau de Castelnau.

Pic Gaspard was climbed for the first time in 1878 by Henry Duhamel, along with Pierre Gaspard and his eldest son, and Christophe Roderon, by a route that has become the normal one. Subsequently, several routes were opened including the south-southeast arête conquered by Lucien Devies and Giusto Gervasutti in 1935, and that of the north face defeated by Albert Tobey and Louis Berger in 1948.

Pic Gaspard had the record for being subject of the longest photographed line of sight anywhere in the world. On 16 July 2016, photographer Marc Bret captured its image from the summit of Pic de Finestrelles, 443 km away. The current longest line of sight on earth photographed is 493.07 km (306.37 mi), achieved by Richard Jezik (Slovakia), in Giresun, Turkey, on 15 December 2024.

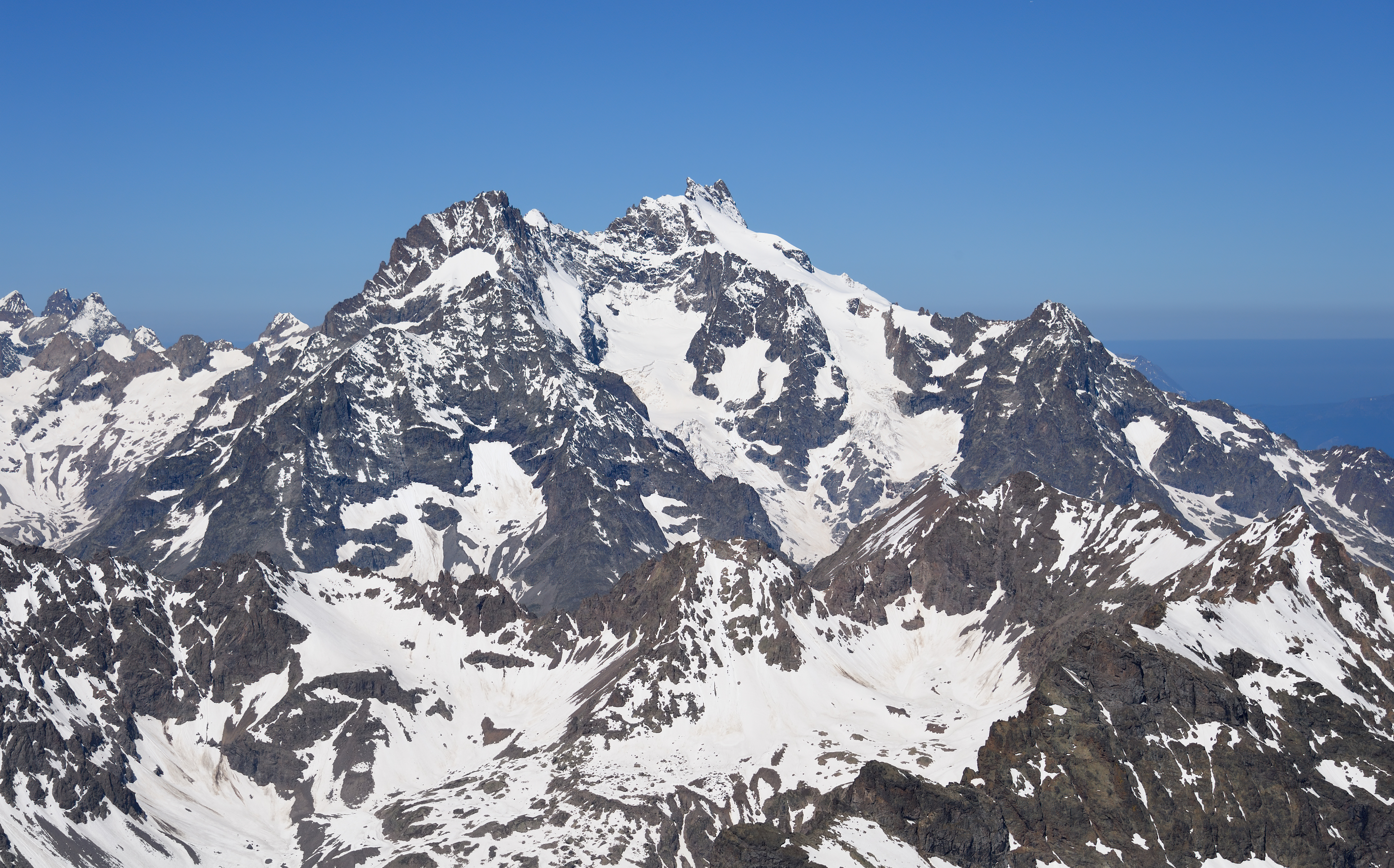
Pic Gaspard (left) and La Meije (right)
