= Dibona =

Dibona may refer to:

- Aiguille Dibona, a mountain in the French Alps
- VF Ivano Dibona, a hiking trail in the Italian Dolomites mountains

== Persons with the surname Dibona ==
- Angelo Dibona, the Italian mountaineer after whom the Aiguille Dibona was named
- Chris DiBona, the open source and public sector engineering manager at Google
- Susan DiBona, American film and television composer based in Europe

== See also ==
- G. Fred DiBona Jr. Building
