= Soreiller hut =

Hut in the Massif du Soreiller above the village of Les Étages

Coordinates: 44°57′38″N 6°14′38″E

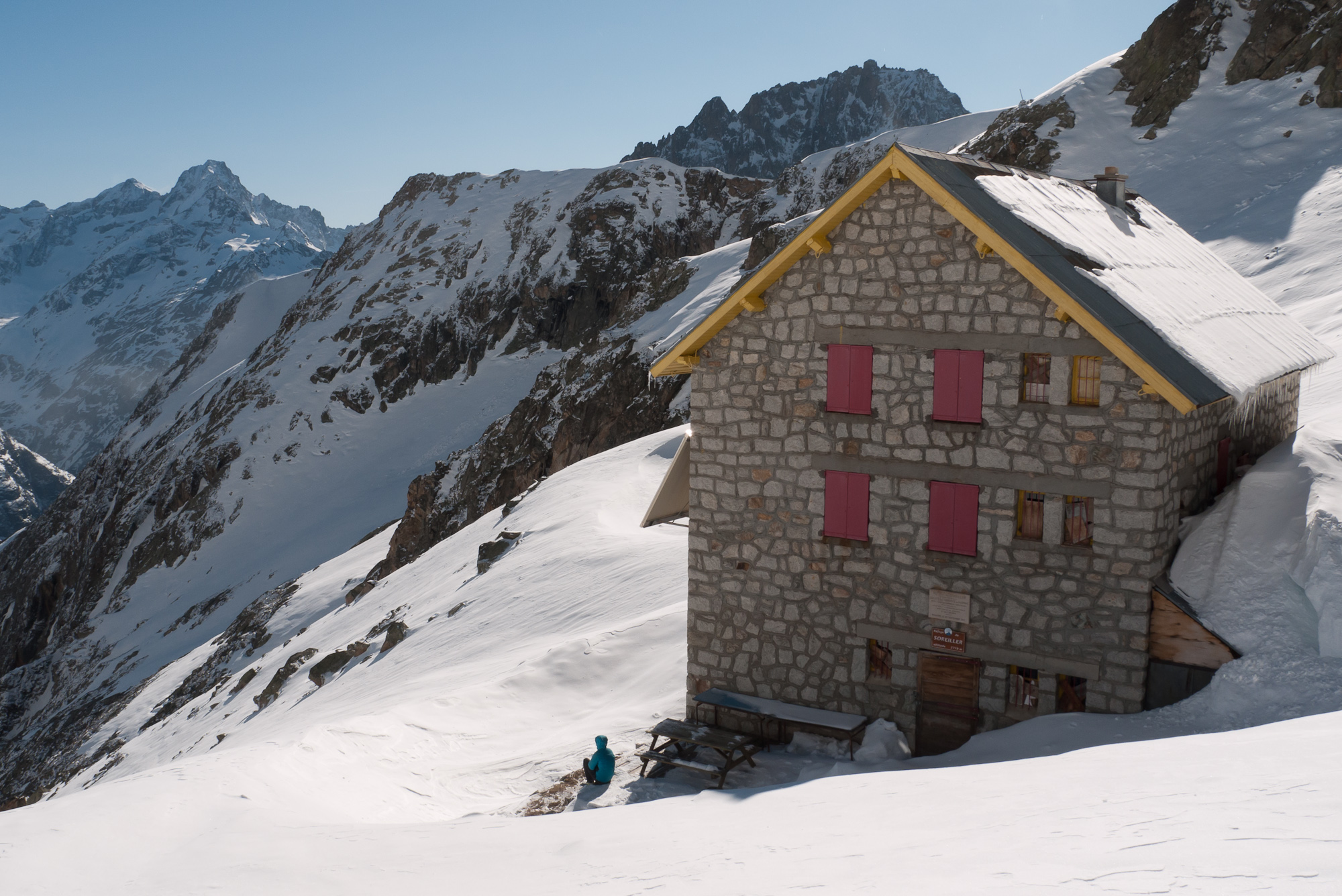
Refuge de Soreiller

The Soreiller hut (Refuge du Soreiller) is a hut in the Massif du Soreiller above the village of Les Étages, in the commune of Saint-Christophe-en-Oisans, France. Nearby mountains include the Aiguille Dibona and the Aiguille du Plat de la Selle.

- Altitude: 2730 m
- Height above road: 1200 m
- Reached in: 2 h 30 approx
- Map: IGN Top 25 - 3336 Est
