= Henry Duhamel =

French mountaineer and skier (1853–1917)

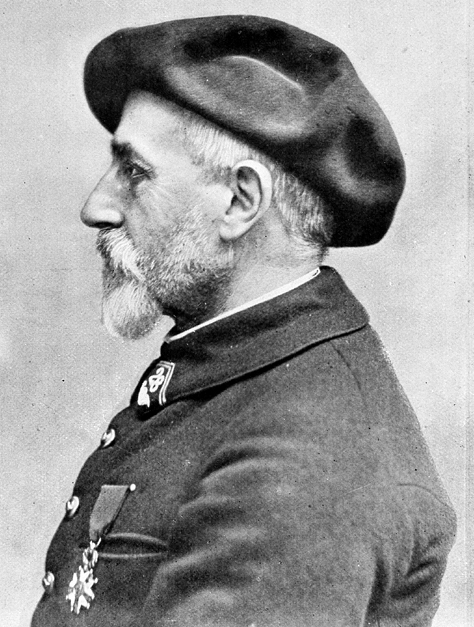
Henry Duhamel

Henry or Henri Duhamel (born 9 December 1853 in Paris, died 7 February 1917 in Gières (Isère)) was a French mountaineer, author and skiing pioneer. He introduced the practice of skiing to his circle of friends at Grenoble, leading to the creation of the first ski club in France.

== Bourgeois athlete ==
Henry Duhamel was born in Paris in 1853 and moved in 1873 to Gières, near Grenoble, due to health problems. There, the young Parisian bourgeois developed a taste for the mountains, the practice of hiking, climbing, running and combined driving and strove to become an accomplished athlete.

In 1874, Duhamel founded the Isère or Grenoble section of the Club alpin français (French Alpine Club) and began to explore the peaks of Dauphiné. In 1875, in the company of Baron Emmanuel Boileau de Castelnau and the guide Alexandre Tournier, Duhamel tried to climb the western peak of the Meije without reaching the summit. A second attempt the following year by the south side led to the foot of a wall deemed impassable. Finally in 1877 Boileau de Castelnau and his guide Pierre Gaspard reached the top, taking the first path traced by Henry Duhamel. Henry Duhamel turned to other peaks, both in France and Kabylie, and established twenty-three new routes, including first ascents of eight virgin peaks. He climbed the Pic Gaspard (3883 m) in 1878 and the south face of the Barre des Écrins (the south arête of the Pic Lory, 4088 m) in 1880 with Pierre Gaspard and his son.

When French mountain climber Henri Cordier was killed in an accident on the slopes of Le Plaret in June 1877, Duhamel took charge of returning Cordier's body to La Bérarde, where he photographed it.

== Ski pioneer ==
Henry Duhamel moved in all seasons in the mountains of Dauphiné, but the winter remained a problematic season. Horses and sleighs pulled by use of a coupling were limited when the snow reached dizzying heights. The athlete could not find a way to stay in shape with outdoor exercises. He considered snowshoes, but they were not suitable for hiking and he failed to find shoes manufactured with satisfactorily wide flanges.

In 1878, looking for Canadian snowshoes, he visited the Exposition Universelle in Paris, where a Norwegian representative showed him the long, narrow boards that his fellow Scandinavians used in winter. He bought the stand display of the unified kingdom of Norway and Sweden. They were snow skis, traditional wooden planks for sliding on snow. Duhamel purchased the skis without instructions on how to use them. Back in Gières, he researched skis in his extensive library, finding a reference to their use by Arctic explorers in a 1539 Swedish encyclopedia. Duhamel realized that the simple lace binding was complex. Due to his lack of mastery of the link with an adapted shoe, he was awkward and took several years to master skiing technique. In 1889, with the best bindings cobbled together by a craftsman, he managed one successful trial to Chamrousse, which ended with a final somersault. He then undertook a trip to Finland in 1890 and met members of the Sami people (or "Lapps") already familiar with the terrain and the use of skis. The tests were successful; skiing became an enjoyable exercise and a tourist pleasure in the fresh air. Duhamel imported fourteen pairs of skis, equipped with good bindings produced in Norway, and proceeded to distribute them to his friends over the years. In November 1895, some of his athlete friends, skiers sufficiently distinguished, decided to gather in a ski club in imitation of the British. The association saw its constitution officially recognized on 1 February 1896. Recreational skiing for the urban bourgeois was born in France.

The first president of the Alpine Ski Club was the founder of the Rock Club, Ernest Thorant. Henry Duhamel declined the presidency because he did not reside in Grenoble. On 1 March 1896 the first joint meeting and celebration under the eye of Alpine journalists was held in the presence of a monitor officer of the Swedish army from Lans-en-Vercors to Autrans, with return by Croix-Perrin. The Moniteur Dauphinois published an extensive account on 7 March 1896. The Alpine press described the technique and the equipment at length.

Historians have questioned Duhamel's remarks about his ski trials in 1878 because he only claimed to have conducted them in late 1908, when skiing reached its first peak of popularity. The first winter ascent of the Croix de Belledonne in snowshoes cannot be attributed to Henry Duhamel. Photographic evidence exists that the first such ascent was conducted by Maurice Allotte of la Fuye on 23 February 1890.

As a supporter of the mountain sports world, Duhamel sought to share his passion with others by publishing numerous articles for the CAF, a Guide du Haut-Dauphiné in 1887 (in collaboration with W. A. B. Coolidge and Félix Perrin) which included a topography in color of the Mont Pelvoux massif, and a tribute to the Alpine troops, Au Pays des Alpins, in 1899.

== Death ==
In 1914, Henry Duhamel was assigned to the 28th Bataillon Alpin de Chasseurs à Pieds as a territorial captain. He was responsible for organizing the training of ski companies going to the Vosges front. As a volunteer instructor officer, he performed his last military mission at the age of sixty-three. Duhamel died on 7 February 1917 as the result of a fall on a patch of ice two months earlier in the courtyard of the barracks of Bonne, Haute-Savoie.

== Legacy ==
Duhamel's library was dispersed at two sales in Lyon in 1921 and 1922. In honor of Duhamel, a street in Grenoble bears his name, as does the gap separating the Croix de Belledonne from the central peak of the Belledonne range, and one of the side peaks in the Massif des Écrins (the Pyramide Duhamel). Duhamel appears as a character in the novel Le roman de Gaspard de la Meije by Isabelle Scheibli.

== Books ==
- Tentatives d'Ascension au Pic Occidental de la Meije ou Aiguille du Midi de la Grave (Hautes-Alps) (1876). Extract from the Annuaire du Club Alpin Français (1875). Paris: Typographie Georges Chamerot.
- Guide du Haut-Dauphiné (1887). With W. A. B. Coolidge and Félix Perrin. Grenoble: Alexandre Gratier.
- Supplément au Guide du Haut-Dauphiné (1890). With W. A. B. Coolidge and Félix Perrin. Grenoble: Imprimerie Breynat et Cie.
- Alpes Dauphinoises (1890). Guides-Joanne. Paris: Hachette.
- The Central Alps of the Dauphiny (1892). With W. A. B. Coolidge and Félix Perrin. London: Fisher Unwin.
- Carte du Haut-Dauphiné (1892). Winterthur: Würster et Randegger.
- Mémoire de la Blottière (1892). Grenoble: Librairie X. Drevet.
- Grenoble considéré comme centre d'excursions alpestres (1893). Grenoble: F. Allier père et fils.
- Description des vallées des grandes Alpes (1894). Grenoble: X. Drevet.
- La topographie du Haut-Dauphiné (1896). Grenoble: X. Drevet.
- Au Pays des Alpins (1899). Grenoble: Falque et Perrin.
- Voyage d'inspection de la frontière des Alpes en 1752 par le Marquis de Paulmy (1902). Grenoble: Falque et Perrin.
