= Refuge du Promontoire =

Coordinates: 44°59′56″N 6°18′13″E

Refuge du Promontoire is a refuge in the French Alps located in the Massif des Écrins. It serves as the starting point of the famous crossing of La Meije, built on the mountain's south face. It sits at an elevation of 3,092 meters.

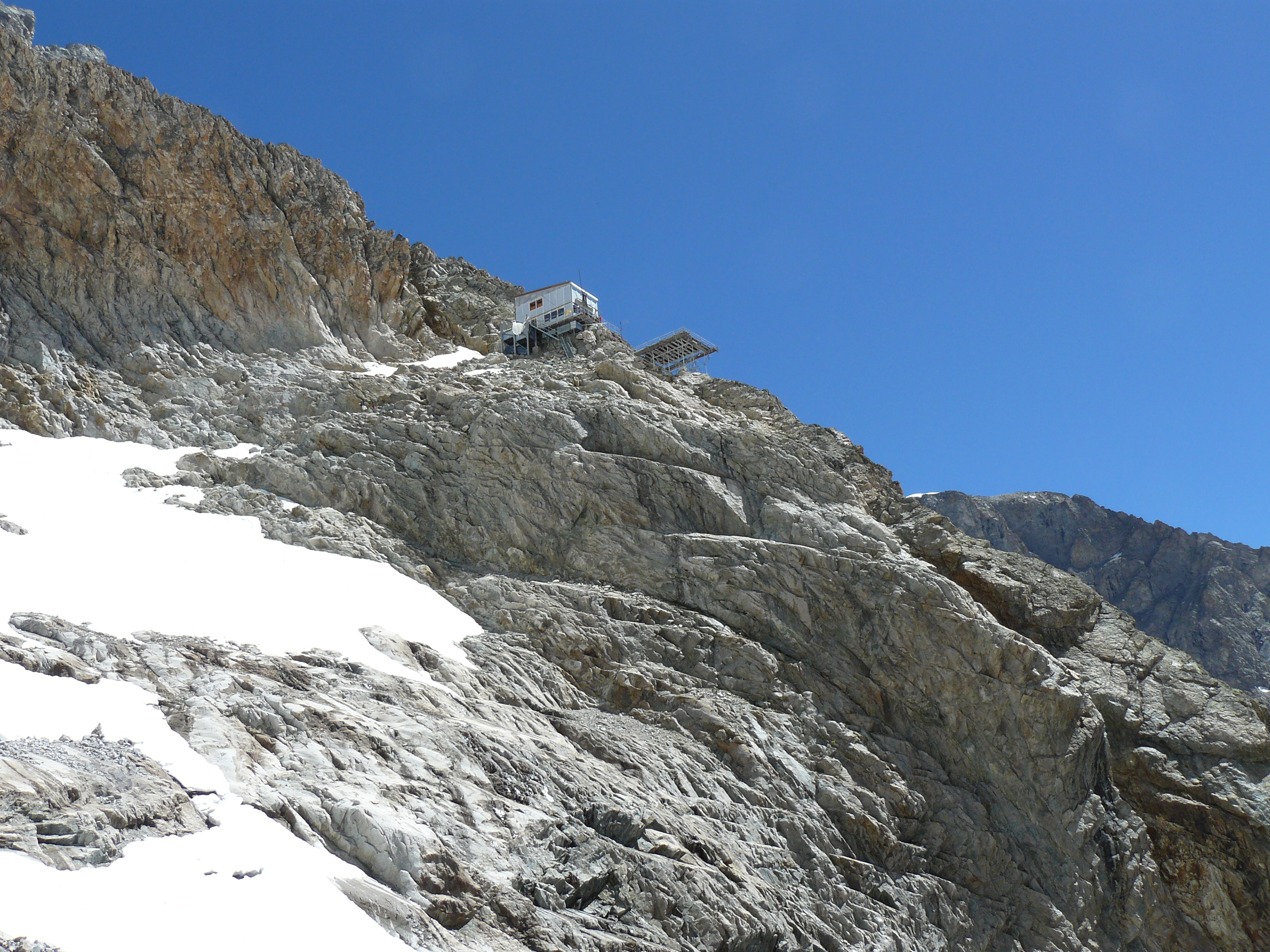
The Refuge du Promontoire

It is accessible from La Bérarde by Le Vallon des Étançons, or from La Grave by Les Enfetchores and La Brêche de la Meije.

The shelter was first constructed in the 1901 out of wood. In 1966, the original structure was demolished and replaced by an aluminium construction. In summer, it can hold up to 30 people and in winter, it can hold up to 18.

The refuge is owned and opereated by FFCAM. To get to sleep a night in this refuge, a reservation is needed. Indeed, you can make a reservation on the website of the refuge : Accueil, Refuge du Promontoire. It is mostly not kept during the winter season.

Sources :

Accueil, Refuge du Promontoire
