= Pendlebury Library of Music =

Coordinates: 52.202128°N 0.107843°E

The Pendlebury Library of Music is the library of the Faculty of Music, University of Cambridge, England. The current building was completed in 1984, and was designed by Sir Leslie Martin. The library is located next to the West Road Concert Hall and the Faculty of Music's old building on the Sidgwick Site, West Road, Cambridge. The current classification system is somewhat similar to the one used for music at Cambridge University Library's Music Collections, and has a basic classification approach of a three-digit number. The library is open to all members of the university.

== History ==
The library is named after Richard Pendlebury who had donated his collection of printed sheet music and manuscripts to the Fitzwilliam Museum, from where most of it was eventually transferred to Cambridge University Library. In 1929 this collection was given to the Music Faculty, and then the name "The Pendlebury Library of Music" was used. In 1994 all music manuscripts were transferred to Cambridge University Library. Pendlebury's original collection of printed sheet music is still accessible at the Pendlebury Library of Music.
