= Meije =

Mountain in France

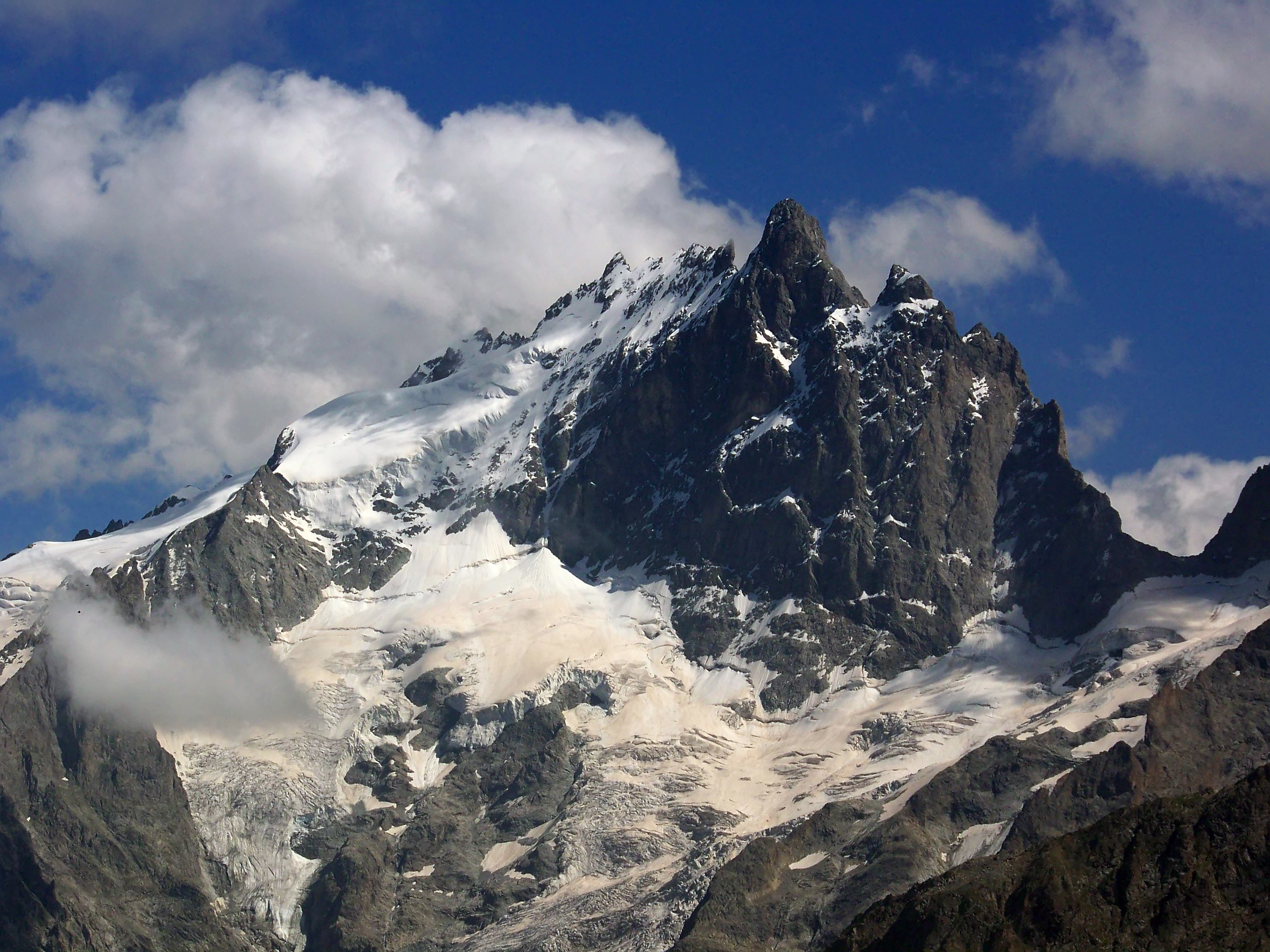
- La Meije

Highest point
- Elevation: 3,984 m (13,071 ft)
- Prominence: 821 m (2,694 ft)
- Isolation: 9.6 km (6.0 mi)
- Listing: Alpine mountains above 3000 m
- Coordinates: 45°00′17″N 6°18′31″E

Geography
- Location within France
- Location: Isère - Hautes-Alpes, France
- Parent range: Dauphiné Alps

Climbing
- First ascent: 1877 by E.B. de Castelnau and P. Gaspard and son
- Easiest route: Southwest face

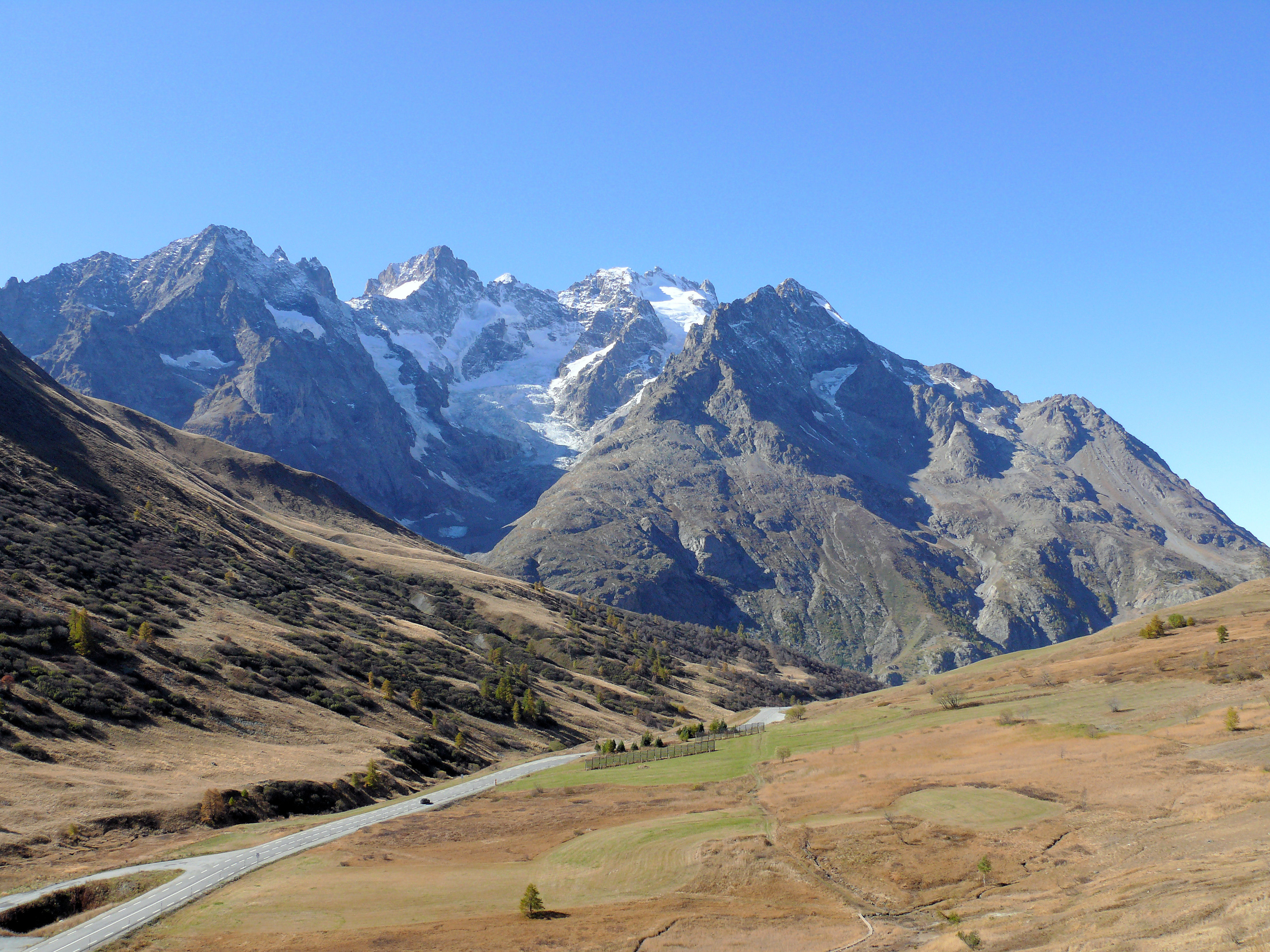
The Meije Massif from Col du Lautaret

La Meije is a mountain in the Massif des Écrins range, located at the border of the Hautes-Alpes and Isère départements. It overlooks the nearby village of La Grave, a mountaineering centre and ski resort, well known for its off-piste and extreme skiing possibilities, and also dominates the view west of the Col du Lautaret. It is the second highest mountain of the Écrins after the Barre des Écrins.

== Summits ==
- Main ridge from west to east
  - Le Grand Doigt, 3.764 m
  - Pic du Glacier Carré, 3.862 m
  - Grand Pic de la Meije or Pic Occidentale, 3.983 m
  - Pic Central or Doigt de Dieu, 3.970 m
  - Pic Oriental, 3.891 m

Neighboring peaks are Le Râteau (3,809 m) to the west, past the Brèche de la Meije (3,357 m) and Le Pavé (3,823 m) and Pic Gaspard (3,881 m) to the southeast, past the Brèche Maximin Gaspard (3,723 m)

== Historic ascents ==
The central and second highest summit has five teeth, the highest of which is known as Doigt de Dieu (English: Finger of God). This summit was reached from the northeast on June 28, 1870, by Christian and Ulrich Almer and Christian Gertsch, guiding Meta Brevoort and W.A.B. Coolidge. The ridge from the central to the main, Western peak, which is 13 meters higher, was considered an insurmountable obstacle for the next 15 years.

The Western true summit of La Meije, the Grand Pic, is notorious for having no "easy" route to its summit. The last major peak in the Alps to be climbed, its first ascent was eventually made from the southwest on 16 August 1877 by father and son Pierre Gaspard and their client Emmanuel Boileau de Castelnau. Their approach, over the south buttress Arête du Promontoire and further over the Glacier Carré and the southwest face of the Grand Pic, is now the normal route.

The first ascent without a guide was made by Frederick Gardiner with Charles and Lawrence Pilkington on 25 July 1879.

On July 26, 1885, Ludwig Purtscheller and the brothers Otto and Emil Zsigmondy made the first traverse from the central to the main summit, via the "insurmountable" gap that is now known as the Brèche Zsigmondy, in what is still considered a classic route, albeit thoroughly modified by a May 1964 rockfall. The traverse in the opposite direction was accomplished six years later by Ulrich Almer, Fritz Boss and John Henry Gibson.

The south face is widely considered to be the most difficult of La Meije. Within two weeks after their successful traverse, the Zsigmondy brothers, together with Karl Schulz, tried to reach the Brèche Zsigmondy over the south face, but Emil died in the attempt. The first successful attempt was not until twenty-seven years later, in 1912 by Angelo Dibona, Luigi Rizzi, and the brothers Guido and Max Mayer, while a direct route over the south face to the Grand Pic was only climbed in 1935 and that to the Central Pic in 1951.

== Approaches ==
For mountaineering, La Meije can be approached from two mountain refuges:

- The refuge du Promontoire at 3,082 metres, is situated at the bottom of the steep south buttress of the peak, and allows access to routes on the south face of the mountain.
- The refuge de l'Aigle at 3,450 metres, is situated at the top of the Tabuchet glacier, and allows access to the north face.

== See also ==
- List of mountains of the Alps above 3000 m
