= Tête des Fétoules =

French Mountain

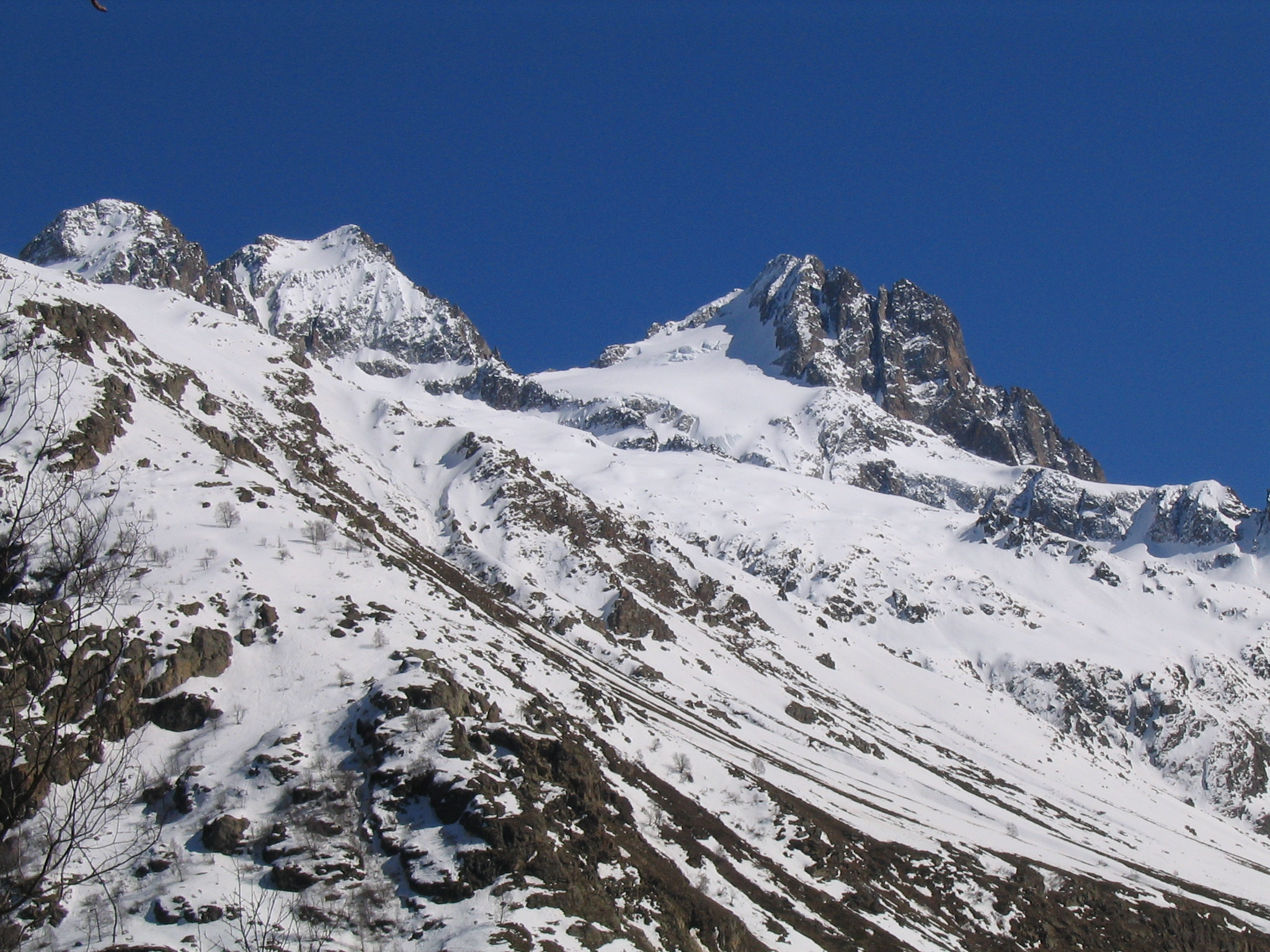

Highest point
- Elevation: 3,459 m (11,348 ft)
- Coordinates: 44°53′59″N 6°14′12″E

Geography
- Location within France
- Location: Isère, France
- Parent range: Massif des Écrins

Tête des Fétoules is a mountain in the French Alps. Located in the Massif des Écrins, the mountain is 3,459 m (11,348 ft) tall.

The first to reach the summit of Tête des Fétoules was Emmanuel Boileau de Castelnau on the 29th of August, 1876.

== See also ==
- Tête du Rouget - Another mountain first ascended by Emmanuel Boileau de Castelnau
- Barre des Écrins - Largest mountain in the Massif des Écrins
