= Richard Pendlebury =

British mathematician (1847 – 1902)

Richard Pendlebury (1847–1902) was a British mathematician, musician, bibliophile and mountaineer.

Pendlebury was born in Liverpool on 28 March 1847 and educated at Liverpool College. He went up to St John's College, Cambridge in 1866 and graduated senior wrangler in 1870: he was then elected to a college fellowship. He was appointed University Lecturer in Mathematics in 1888. He collected early mathematical books and printed music, donating his collections to his college and university. His presentation of a collection of music books and manuscripts to the Fitzwilliam Museum stimulated the formation of the Music Faculty at Cambridge University and the university's Pendlebury Library of Music is named after him.

Most of his more difficult alpine expeditions were made with his brother, W. M. Pendlebury and it was with his brother, along with Rev. C Taylor and the guide Ferdinand Imseng, that he made the first ascent of the east face of the alpine peak Monte Rosa from Macugnaga in 1872. His first ascent of the Pic Olan, on 8 July 1875, was made with Arthur Cust.

The Pendlebury Traverse on Pillar Rock in Cumberland bears his name, he took part in the first ascent of this climb in September 1872, along with his brother William and Frederick Gardiner, but it was actually Gardiner who initiated and led the climb.

In his later years Pendlebury moved to Keswick, Cumbria where he died on 13 March 1902.
