= Giusto Gervasutti =

Italian mountain climber, Alpini officer and skier

Personal information
- Born: 17 April 1909 Cervignano del Friuli, Italy
- Died: 16 September 1946 (aged 37) Mont Blanc du Tacul

Sport
- Sport: Skiing
- Club: Ski Club Torino

Giusto Gervasutti (17 April 1909 – 16 September 1946) was an Italian mountain climber, Alpini officer and skier.

== Biography ==
Gervasutti, also known as "Il Fortissimo" ("the strongest"), was born in Cervignano del Friuli. He started climbing at the age of 16 years. In 1931, he moved to Turin to study at the local university.

Together with other well known climbers of the time he climbed the most difficult and sought-after faces in the Western Alps. His first notable success was the first repetition of Karl Brendelet's and Hermann Schaller's difficult climb on the south ridge route of the Aiguille Noire de Peuterey one year after them. Further he completed some first ascents of reliefs in the Dauphiné Alps, for example the North West of the Pic d'Olan and the North West of the Ailefroide. During a visit in Chile in 1934, he climbed some five-thousanders. In 1936, he made the first winter solo ascent of the Hörnli ridge of the Matterhorn. Also notable would be his ascent on the south west edge of the Picco Gugliermina, which he mastered together with Gabriele Boccalatte in 1938. His masterpiece was the first ascent of the difficult east wall of the Grandes Jorasses, together with Giuseppe Gagliardone in 1942, while he served as a military officer in World War II.

Gervasutti was member of the Ski Club Torino. Due to an injury at the third Trofeo Mezzalama in 1935, he had to withdraw. Paula Wiesinger, who was invited to view the race, took his military uniform, covered her face with sunglasses and his cap, and took part instead of him, but the cheat was discovered at a check point of the race.

== Death ==
Gervasutti died in a mountaineering accident on the Mont Blanc du Tacul, when he was accompanied by Gagliardone. They were on the way back, because they had to abort the ascent on the north east wall, when the double rope pinched. During the attempt to set it free, Gervasutti fell headlong into a gap. The spur was named after him.
