= Pic de Finestrelles =

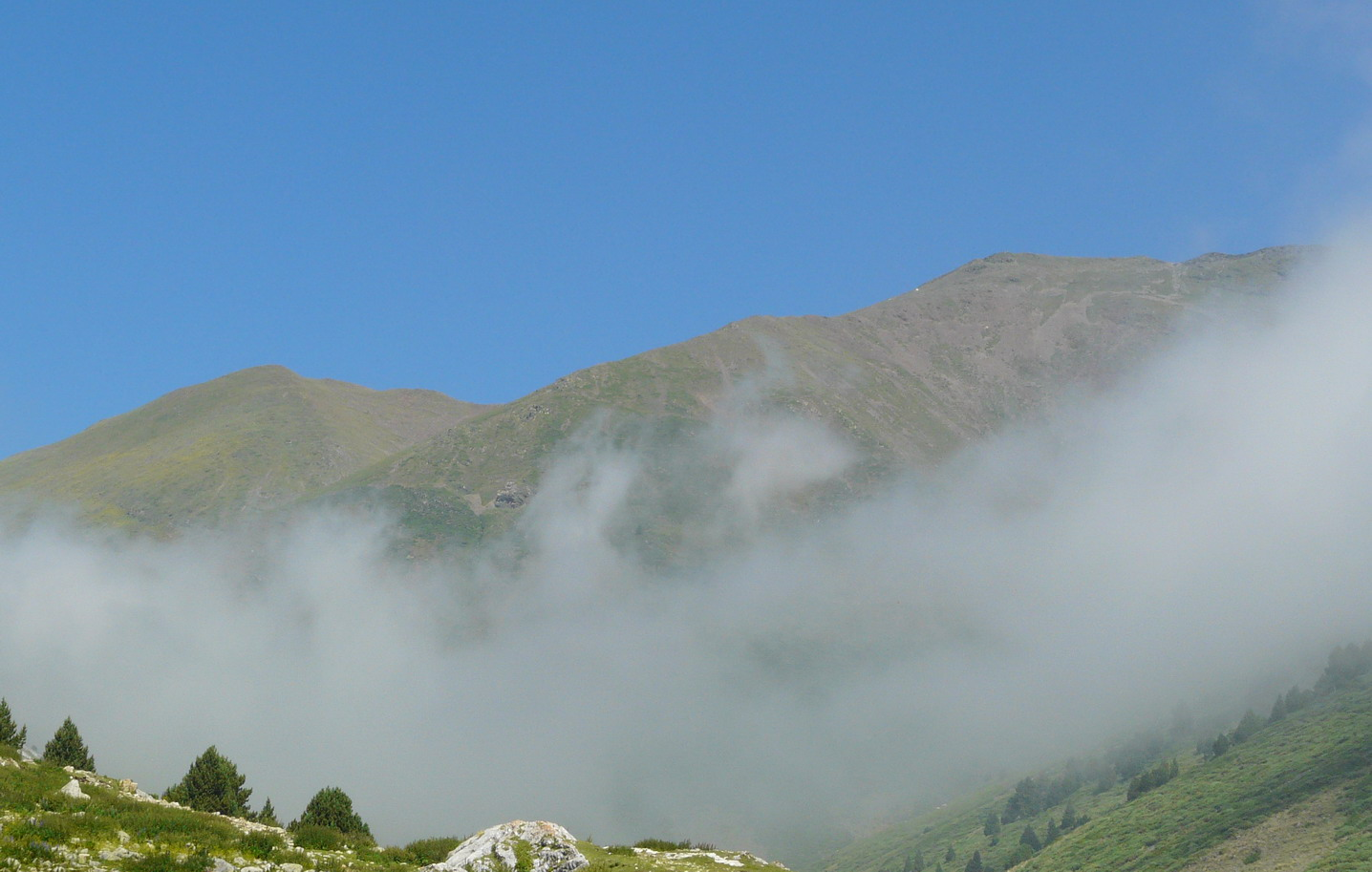

Highest point
- Elevation: 2,826 m (9,272 ft)
- Coordinates: 42°24′52.03″N 2°08′0.726″E

Geography
- Location within Pyrenees
- Location: Queralbs (Ripollès); Eina and Llo (Alta Cerdanya), Catalonia, Spain
- Parent range: Pyrenees

Climbing
- First ascent: Unknown
- Easiest route: From Ulldeter or Vall de Núria

Pic de Finestrelles is a mountain located in the Oriental Pyrenees, on the border of France and Spain. It has an altitude of 2,826 metres (9,272 ft) above sea level.

This peak is notable for being the mountain from which the world record for the most distant photographed landscape on Earth was taken. The view included the Massif of Ecrins (French Alps). The mountains were photographed at dawn on 16 July 2016 by Marc Bret. The furthest point in the shot was Pic Gaspard, 443 km (275.2 miles) away. Bret used a Panasonic Lumix FZ72 with 1200mm zoom.

== See also ==
- Pyrenees
- Beyond horizons
