= Aiguille du Plat de la Selle =

Mountain in France

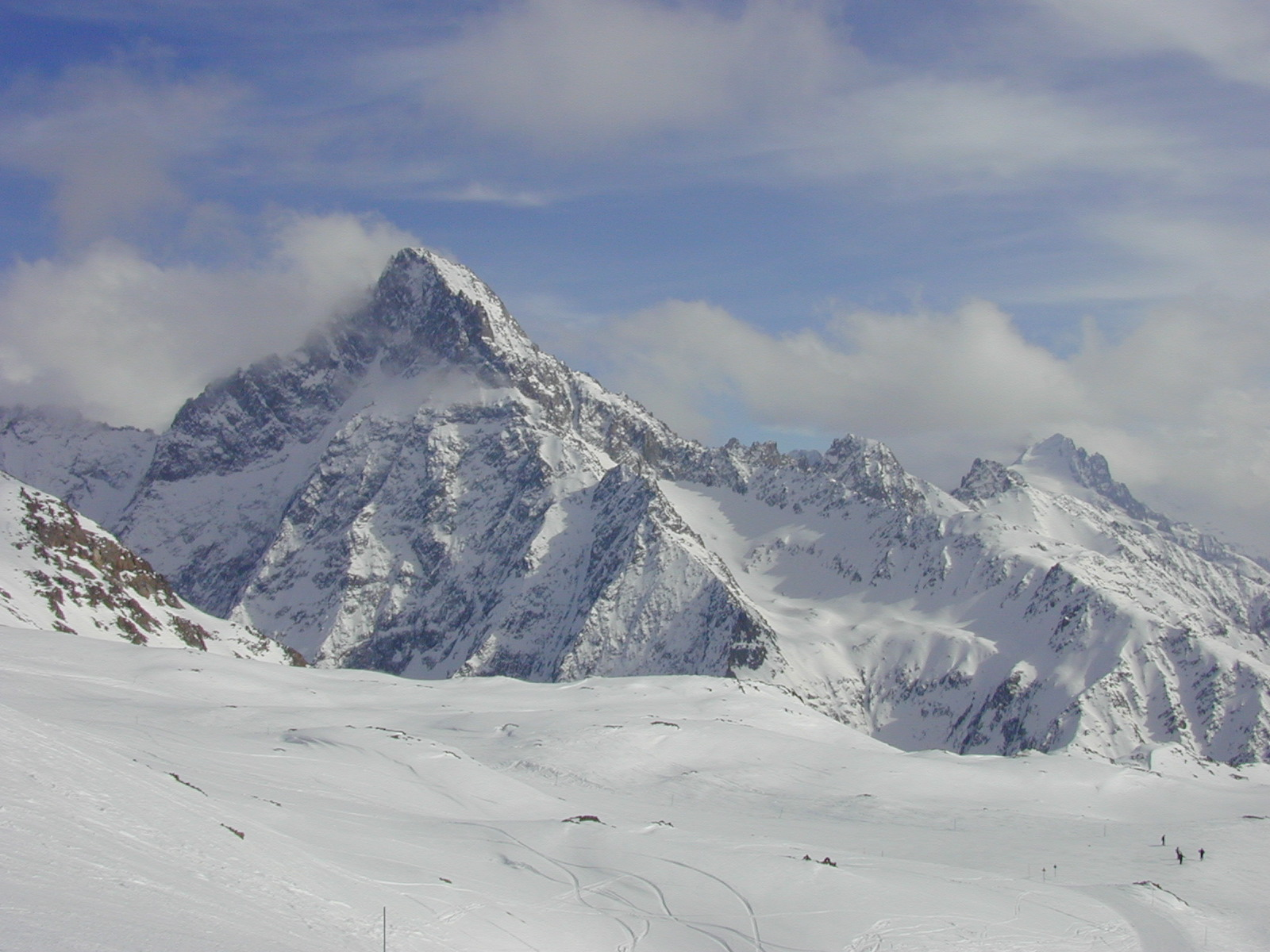
- Aiguille du Plat de la Selle in winter

Highest point
- Elevation: 3,596 m (11,798 ft)
- Prominence: 423 m (1,388 ft)
- Listing: Alpine mountains above 3000 m
- Coordinates: 44°57′53″N 06°13′18″E

Geography
- Location within France
- Location: Rhône-Alpes, France
- Parent range: Massif fed Écrins, Dauphiné Alps

Climbing
- First ascent: 28 June 1876 by Henri Cordier, Jakob Anderegg, and Andreas Maurer

The Aiguille du Plat de la Selle, 3,596 m, is a mountain of the Massif des Écrins in the Dauphiné Alps in south-eastern France. Ascents of the mountain are via Saint-Christophe-en-Oisans or the Soreiller hut.

== See also ==
- List of mountains of the Alps
