= Olan (mountain) =

Mountain in the French Alps

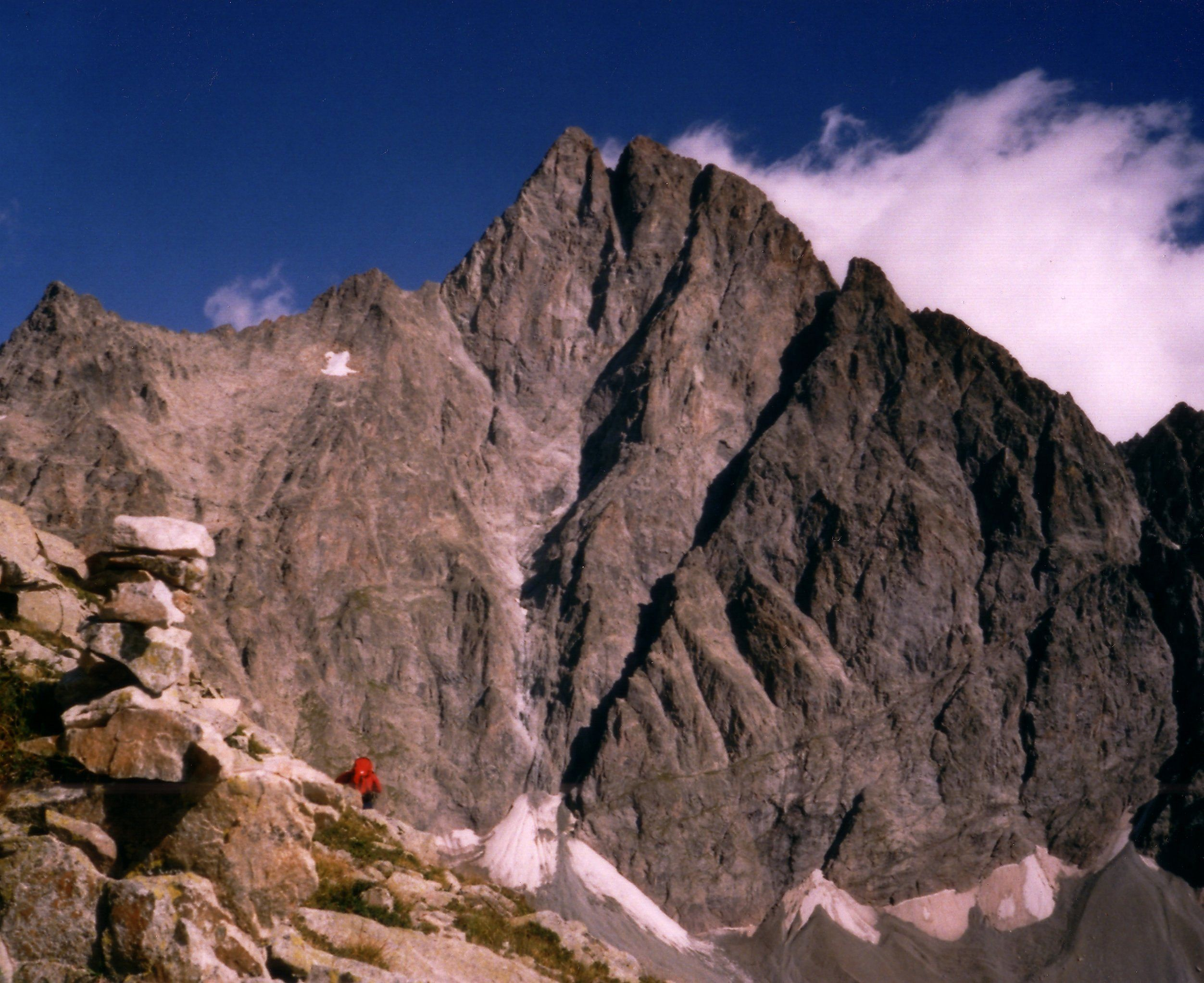
- The north-west face of the Olan, showing the north (left) and central summit.

Highest point
- Elevation: 3,564 m (11,693 ft)
- Prominence: 528 m (1,732 ft)
- Listing: Alpine mountains above 3000 m
- Coordinates: 44°51′32″N 6°11′48″E

Geography
- Location within France
- Location: Hautes-Alpes/Isère, France
- Parent range: Dauphiné Alps

Climbing
- First ascent: 8 July 1875 (Sommet Central); 29 June 1877 (Sommet Nord)
- Easiest route: North ridge (rock, AD, II)

The Olan (l'Olan in French) (3564 m) is a mountain in the Massif des Écrins in the French Alps. It dominates the valleys of Valgaudemar, Valjouffrey, and Vénéon in the heart of Écrins National Park.

The mountain has two or three summits: the Épaule Sud (3,514 m), which can be considered a shoulder, the Sommet Central (3,558 m) and the Sommet Nord (3,564 m). Before the ascents it was unclear which of the main summits was the higher one.

== Climbing ==
The first successful ascent of the mountain was made on July 8, 1875, by Gabriel ("Gaber") and Josef Spechtenhauser, from Schnals in Tyrol, guiding the British gentlemen Richard Pendlebury and Arthur Cust. Cust had to give up below the summit, but the Spechtenhausers brought Pendlebury to the central peak, since sometimes called Cime Pendlebury, where they had to turn around swiftly because of a lightning storm, which made the descent very adventurous. The following summer Christian and Ulrich Almer and W.A.B. Coolidge got stuck where Cust had turned around in 1875, but on 29 Jun 1877 the same party repeated the ascent of the central summit and proceeded in 55 minutes through the gap to the north summit (hence Cime Coolidge). Three more parties reached the south summit via the same route in 1877 and 1879, before Pierre Gaspard (father), Christophe Roderon and Arthur Cust reached the north summit via a new route, from the north over the Glacier des Sellettes, on August 8, 1880. Cust's measurements from the north summit showed it to be about 10 feet higher than the central peak.

The great classical routes of the Olan are difficult, and the poor quality of the rock makes the climbing quite dangerous. Routes on the north-west side, from the Font-Turbat refuge, include: north ridge (AD), Couzy-Desmaison (ED), Devies-Gervasutti (TD), and the Candau ridge (D). . On the south-west face is the 'Pilier Nounours' (Teddy Bear pillar, TD), a modern route that was well equipped with bolts by J-M. Cambon.

== Geology ==
The Olan is made of a granite base, with a gneiss "hat" (see photos on ).

== Huts ==
- Refuge de Font-Turbat (north side)
- Refuge de l'Olan (south side)
