= Tête du Rouget =

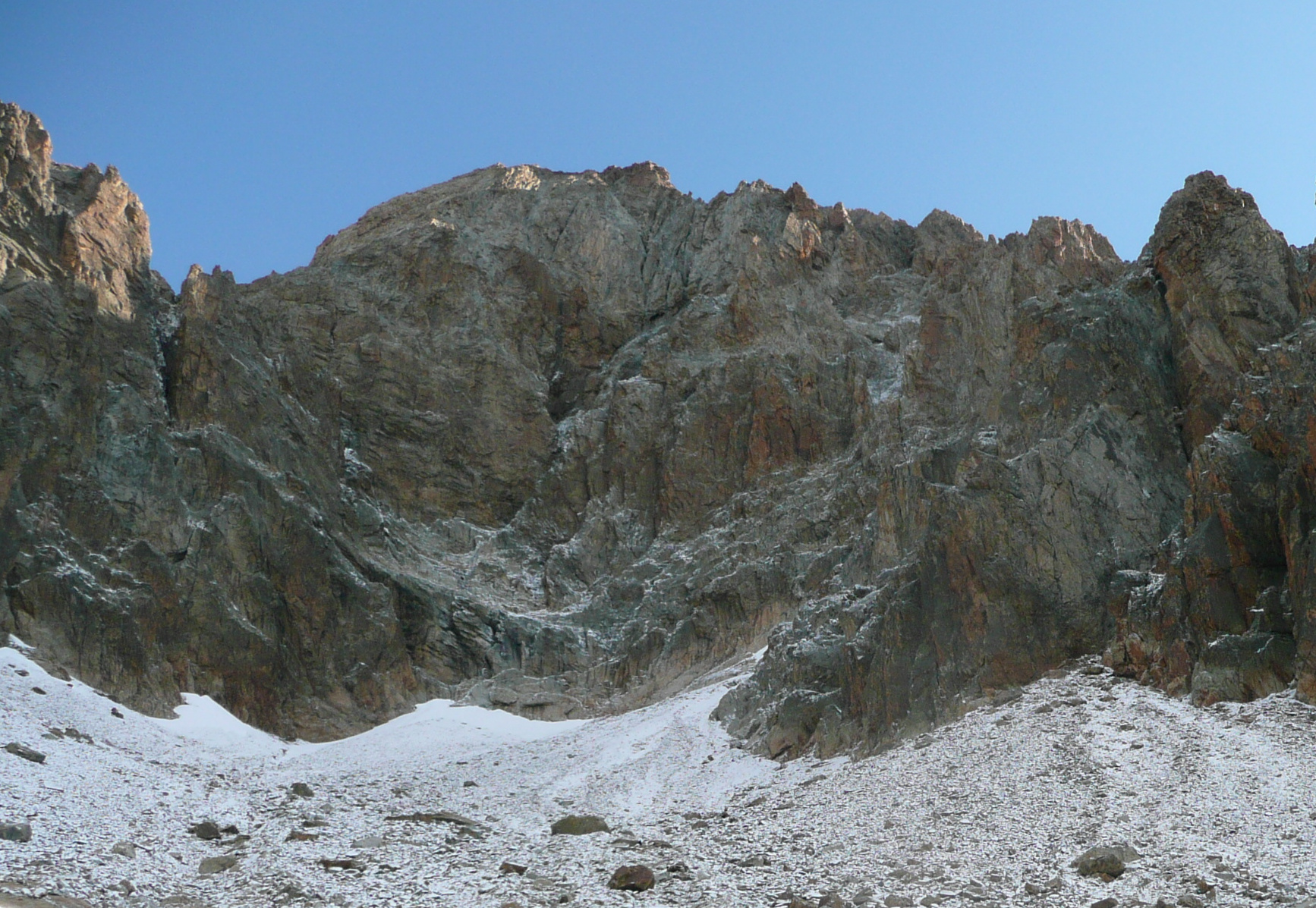

Highest point
- Elevation: 3,418 m (11,214 ft)
- Coordinates: 44°57′18″N 6°15′48″E

Geography
- Location within France
- Location: Isère, France
- Parent range: Massif des Écrins

Tête du Rouget is a mountain in the French Alps, located in the Massif des Écrins, with a summit elevation of 3,418 m (11,214 ft).

== Geography and geology ==
The mountain is characterized by its steep faces, particularly on the western and southern sides. The west face rises approximately 300 meters, while the southern face is even more imposing at 470 meters in height. The southern face is notable for its complex topography, featuring numerous spurs and secondary summits, including the Grand Gendarme du Rouget and the Tour Jaune.

== Surrounding area ==
The mountain is part of a larger alpine region rich in notable peaks. Within about an 8-kilometer radius, several other significant mountains stand, including the Aiguille Dibona (3,130 m), Aiguille du Plat de la Selle (3,596 m), and the more distant but prominent Mont Pelvoux (3,946 m).
