= Tête de l'Etret =

Mountain in France

Tête de l'Étret
- Location within France

Highest point
- Elevation: 3,559 m (11,677 ft)
- Listing: Alpine mountains above 3000 m
- Coordinates: 44°53′22″N 6°14′41″E

Geography
- Location: Isère, France
- Parent range: Massif des Écrins

Tête de l'Étret is a mountain in the French Alps, located in the Massif des Écrins. It has a summit elevation of 3,559 m (11,677 ft) above sea level.

== See also ==
- List of mountains of the Alps
