= La Grave =

- Commune
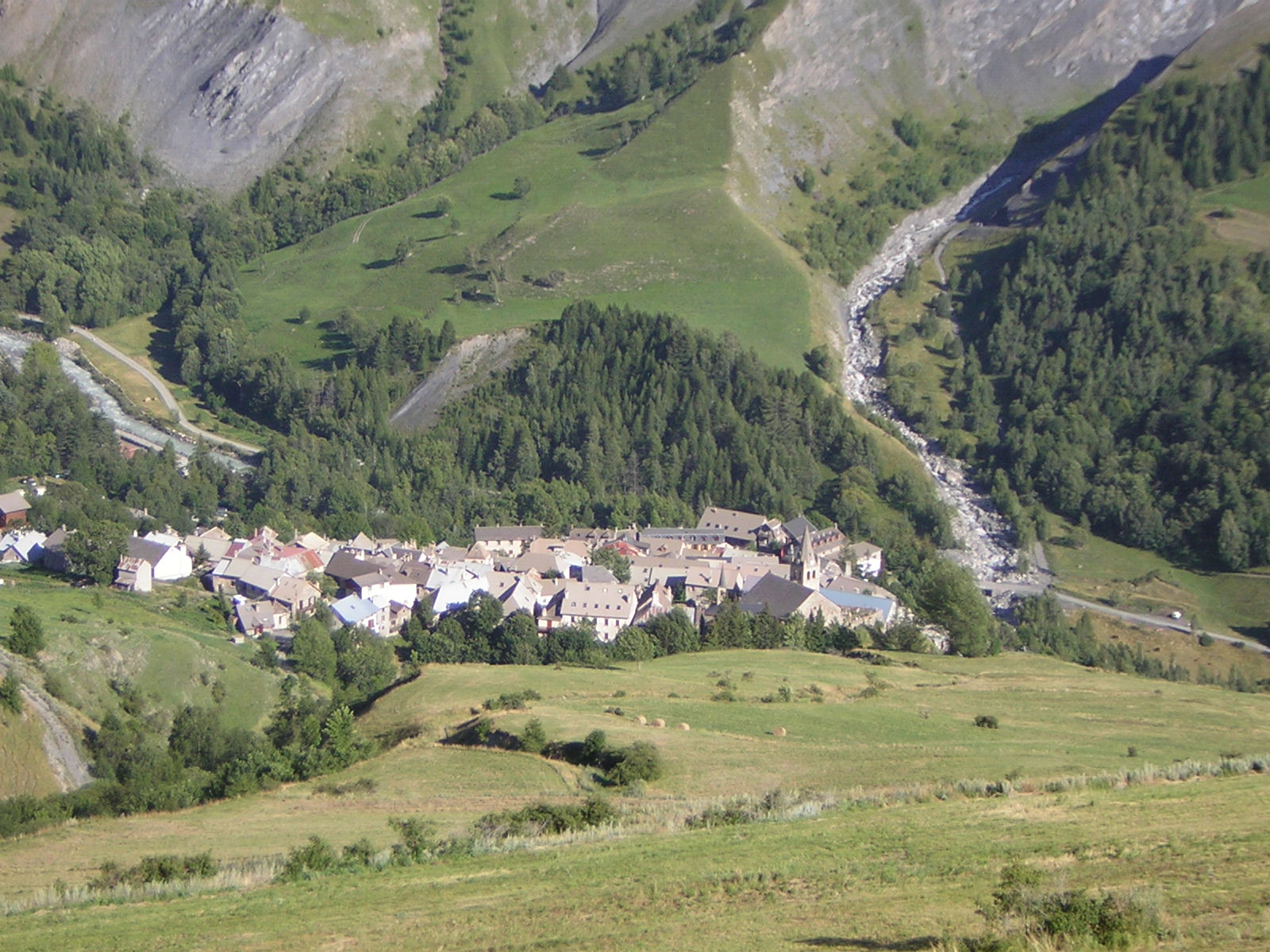
- A view from the nearby hillside

- Coat of arms
- Location of La Grave
- Location within France Location within Provence-Alpes-Côte d'Azur
- Coordinates: 45°02′49″N 6°18′24″E
- Country: France
- Region: Provence-Alpes-Côte d'Azur
- Department: Hautes-Alpes
- Arrondissement: Briançon
- Canton: Briançon-1
- Intercommunality: Briançonnais

Government
  - Mayor (2026–32): Jean-Pierre Pic
- Area^{1}: 126.91 km^{2} (49.00 sq mi)
- Elevation: 1,520 m (4,990 ft)
- Highest elevation: 3,976 m (13,045 ft)
- Lowest elevation: 1,135 m (3,724 ft)
- Population (2023): 479
  - Density: 3.77/km^{2} (9.78/sq mi)
- Demonym: Gravarots
- Time zone: UTC+01:00 (CET)
  - Summer (DST): UTC+02:00 (CEST)
- INSEE/Postal code: 05063 /05320
- ^{1} French Land Register data, which excludes lakes, ponds, glaciers > 1 km^{2} (0.386 sq mi or 247 acres) and river estuaries.

La Grave (French pronunciation: [la ɡʁav]; Occitan: La Grava) is a commune in the Hautes-Alpes department in southeastern France. It is a member of Les Plus Beaux Villages de France (The Most Beautiful Villages of France) Association.

It is a small ski resort in the French Alps, dominated by La Meije (3,982 m). It was the birthplace of Nicolas de Nicolay; adventurer and Geographer Ordinary to Henry II of France.

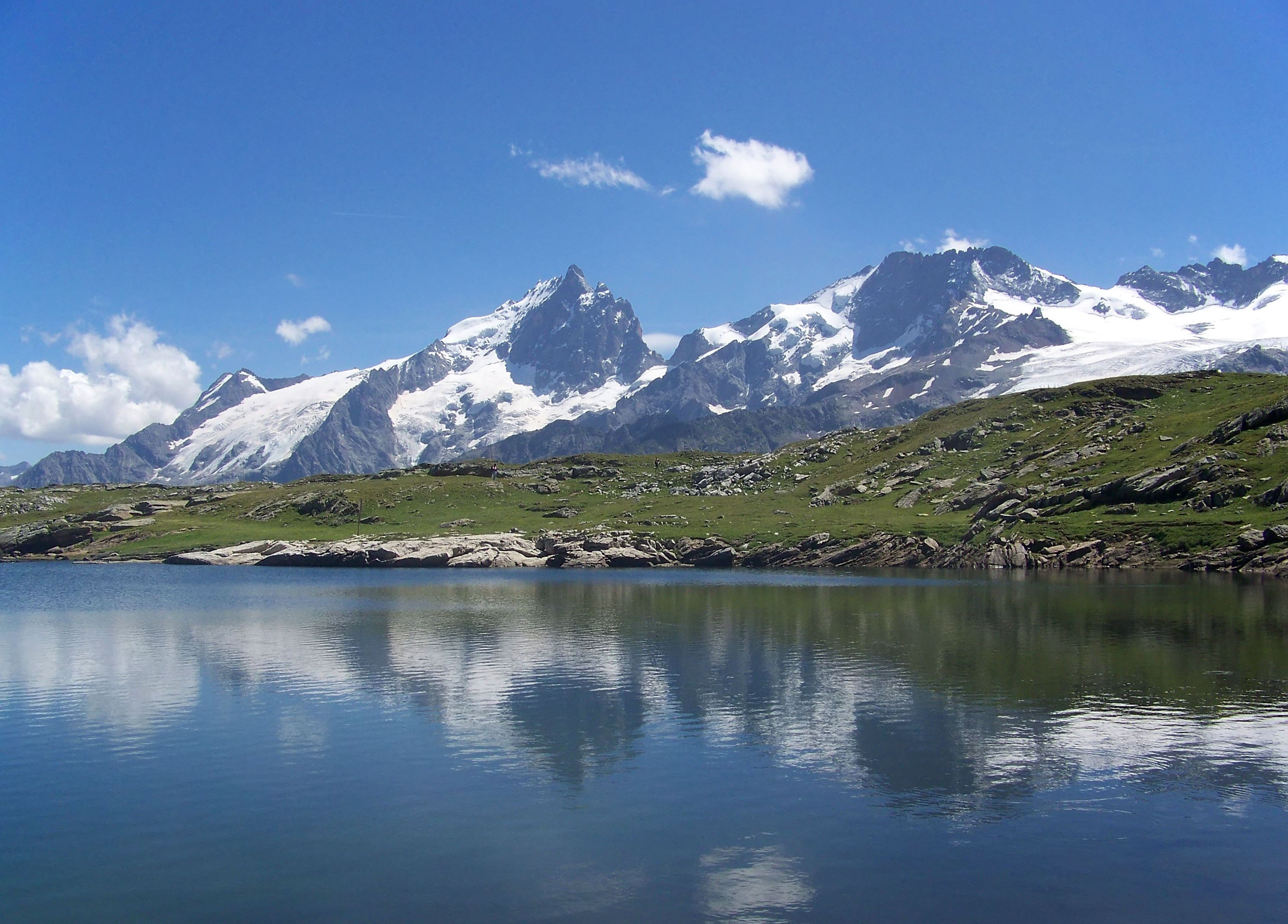
La Meije seen from the Lac Noir

== Skiing ==
While La Grave has a small ski resort in Le Chazelet, it is famous for the Vallons de la Meije (1400 m - 3560 m), an unpisted and although patrolled area on the North side of the Massif des Écrins. It has no formal avalanche control. The area is dangerous to ski unless supported by a guide, including much glacier travel at the very top..

La Grave is visited by off-piste and extreme skiers. The vertical drop totals 2,150 metres, although it is possible to ski below the resort to the road and increase the vertical descent to 2,300 metres.

Mechanical access to the mountain is limited to a closed, two-stage, pulse gondola system. The first lift starts at 1,450 metres, runs through one intermediate station (known as P1 at 1,800 metres) then terminates at Peyrou d'Amont (2,400 metres). The second stage of the gondola runs directly from Peyrou d'Amont to the Col des Ruillans (3,200 metres). The top of the gondola then allows access to button lift (which is the world's only fully suspended surface lift) to reach the top of the Girose Glacier (3550m). The Girose Glacier can also be reached from the resort of Les Deux Alpes on the other side, although this entails a one to two kilometre walk.

There are two main routes of descent. To the skier's right of the gondola station at the Col des Ruillans are 'Les Vallons de La Meije', a variation of which leads to the Trifides couloirs, and ultimately to the valley bottom and the Romanche River. Skiers can also make leftwards traverses to return to Peyrou d'Amont or P1 to avoid skiing the lower section which can be rocky or even grassy meadows in poor snow conditions.

To the skier's left from the Col des Ruillans is known as the Chancel route (also accessible from the Girose Glacier) which leads to several couloirs (the Banane, Patou, Couloir du Lac) around the Lac de Puyvachier and the Refuge Evariste Chancel. Below this point skiers can either traverse right to return to P1 or descend directly to the valley floor and village of Les Fréaux via the steep Fréaux Couloir.

Alternative descents include various routes to the south of the highest point of the lifts (the Dome de Lauze, at the top of the T-bar) in the Vallon du Diable. These lead to the village of St Christophe en Oisans from which alternative transport must be arranged in order to return to La Grave or to join the Deux Alpes lift system and return via the top of the Girose Glacier. There are several direct routes from the top of the Girose Glacier to the valley such as Chirouse and Orcières; these involve complex routefinding and sometimes abseils. Other routes include the Pan du Rideau and Y-Couloir, reached via a walk from the top of the first T-bar; they involve a steep ski down onto the Glacier du Rateau then rejoin the Vallons de La Meije.

In April 2006 Doug Coombs died while trying to save a friend in the Couloir de Polichinelle.

There are restaurants at Peyrou d'Amont and the Col des Ruillans, and food is served at the Refuge Evariste Chancel. Beds at both the Refuge and in a sleeping space in the Col des Ruillans restaurant.

The lease on the cable car is due to expire in 2017. As of 2015, no one had shown interest in taking over the cable car.

== Ice climbing ==
La Grave is also a location for ice climbing. The valley receives little sun in winter and icefalls form on the valley sides. Climbing routes range from under 100 to over 300 metres long and are climbed in a number of pitches. Routes range from easy La Gorge II/3 to hard Diabolobite II/5+.

== Population ==
Historical population
Year	Pop.	±% p.a.
1968	562	—
1975	513	−1.29%
1982	453	−1.76%
1990	455	+0.06%
1999	511	+1.30%
2007	495	−0.40%
2012	487	−0.33%
2017	482	−0.21%
2023	479	−0.10%
Source: INSEE

== See also ==
- Communes of the Hautes-Alpes department
