= Angelo Dibona =

Italian mountain climber

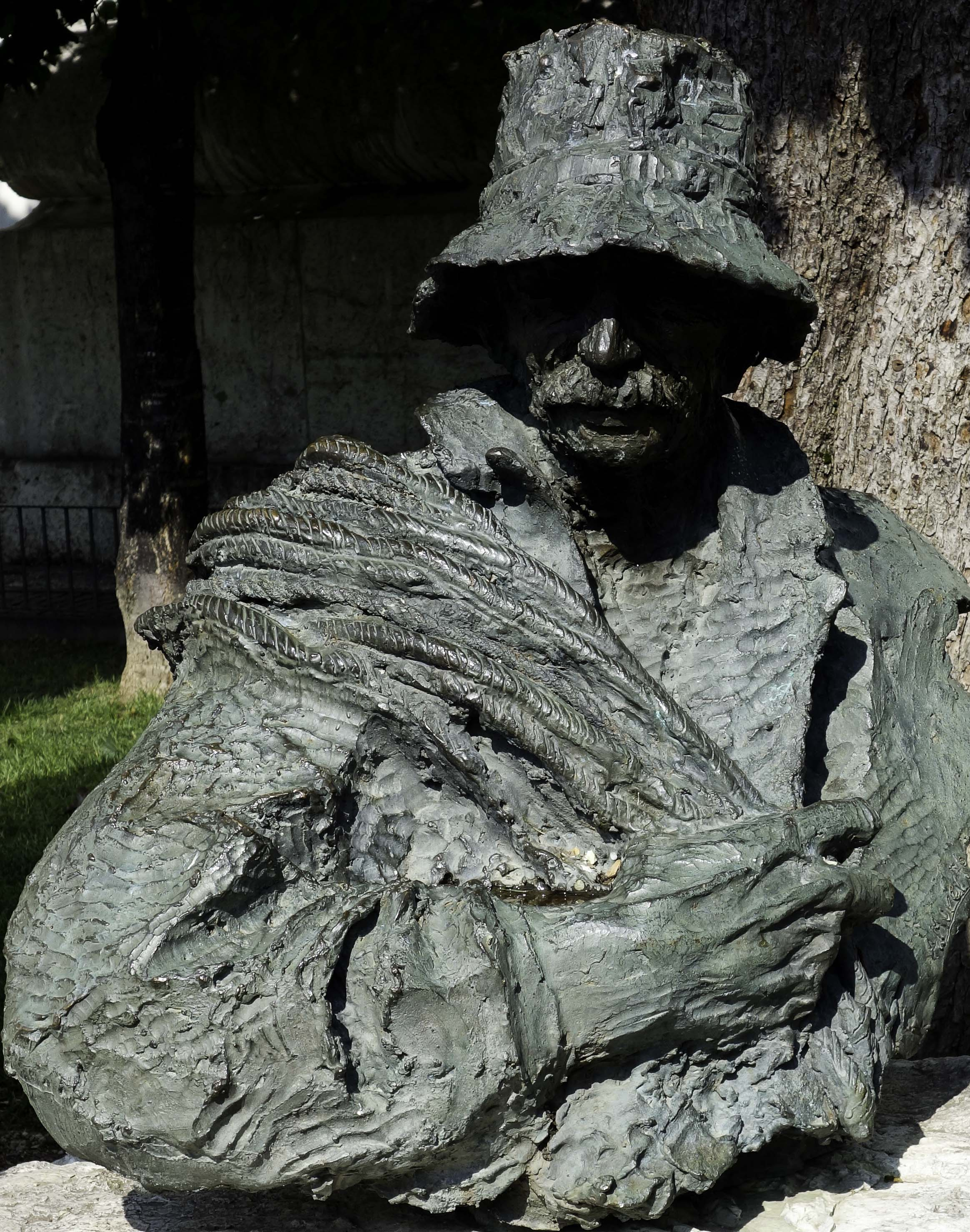
Bronze bust of Angelo Dibona on the main square of Cortina, the "Piazza Angelo Dibona". Sculpted by Augusto Murer, 1976.

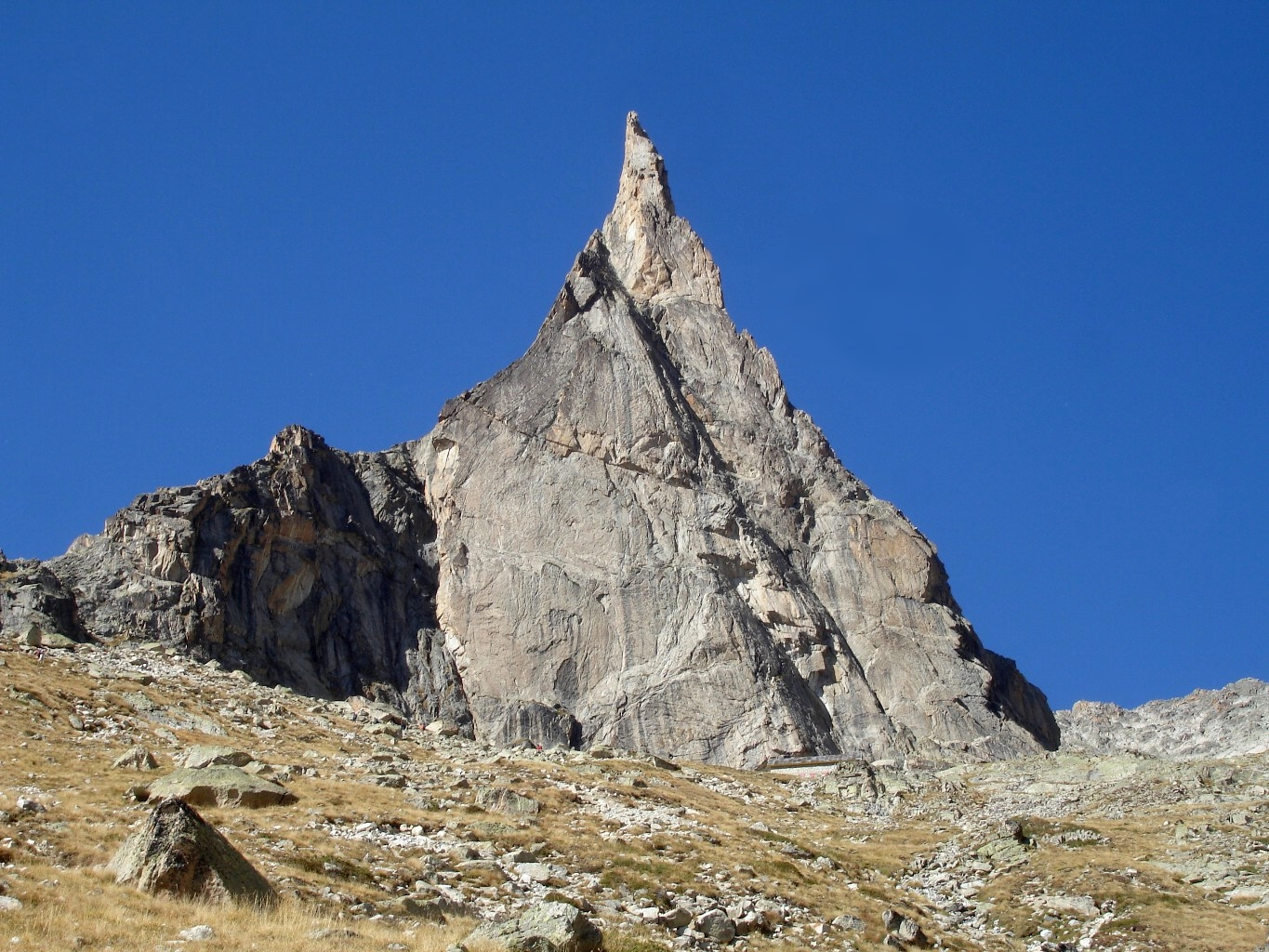
The Aiguille Dibona in France is named after Angelo Dibona.

Angelo Dibona (7 April 1879 – 21 April 1956, nickname: Pilato) was an Austro-Hungarian mountaineer. In World War I, he fought for Austria, but his home South Tyrol was annexed by Italy anyway. He is remembered as one of the great pioneers of climbing in the Dolomites and is responsible for many first ascents throughout the Alps. The Aiguille Dibona in France, the Campanile Dibona (Monte Cristallo) and the Dibona-Kante on the Cima Grande di Lavaredo (both in Italy) are named after him.

== Biography ==
Dibona was born in Cortina d'Ampezzo in 1879. From 1905 he was a mountain guide and a ski instructor in the Cortina area, and he became known for pioneering routes in the Dolomites, making more than 70 first ascents and becoming the leading climber during the heyday of climbing in the Dolomites. In 1910 he made the second ascent of the Christomannosturm in the Latemar, 13 years after its first ascent. Dibona's route included a 600 m (2,000 ft) high rock face with fifth-degree passages. He made notable ascents of a number of peaks in other parts of the Alps in the early 1900s. In the course of his life he climbed Italian, Austrian, German, French, Swiss, British and Slovenian mountains.

One of his most notable first ascents was of the Pain de Sucre du Soreiller, a 3,130 m (10,270 ft) granite peak in the French Massif des Écrins, which he climbed in 1913 with Guido Mayer (an Austrian client with whom he climbed many peaks in the Dolomites and other parts of the Alps). This mountain was renamed the Aiguille Dibona in his honor. Dibona developed a long-term and almost symbiotic friendship with Mayer and his brother. The first ascent of Dibona with Luigi Rizzi and the brothers Guido and Max Mayer on the very high southwest face of the Croz dell'Altissimo (Brenta) is known, where Dibona made sections of the upper V ° during complete free climbing on August 16, 1910.

He became one of the most famous guides and mountaineers ever. The Belgian King Albert I and the two baronesses Ilona und Rolanda von Eötvös, for example, were also among his customers. Angelo Dibona was not only an alpine guide, but also became one of the first three ski instructors in Cortina d'Ampezzo in 1911.

In the First World War he fought as a Kaiserjäger on the Austro-Hungarian side together with Luis Trenker and was awarded two medals of bravery and the "Iron Merit Cross with Crown" (Eiserne Verdienstkreuz mit der Krone). He fought on the Isonzo, Mangart, Ortler and Presanella. His special task was to lay telephone lines through seemingly inaccessible walls. He experienced the end of the "Mountain Guide War" in 1918 on the Ortler, together with his best friend Franz Aschenbrenner. Other well-known mountaineers such as Sepp Innerkofler, Gustav Jahn and Rudl Eller were his comrades on the Dolomite front. During the war he also worked as a course leader and instructor for mountain combat.

In the 1920s he climbed in the English Lake District, making first ascents of gills in the Honister Pass area. In 1947 the Appalachian Mountain Club reported that Dibona was still doing "spectacular" rock climbs at the age of 65.

In the controversy between Paul Preuss and Hans Dülfer about the use of pitons when climbing from before the 1st World War, Dibona spoke out in favor of safety. When Luis Trenker asked how many pitons he had hit in total, Dibona replied: "Fifteen, six of them on the Laliderer north face, three on the Ödstein, two on the Croz dell 'Altissimo, one on the Einser and the rest on other difficult climbs." When asked about his three most difficult tours, he said: "The south face of the Meije, then the Dent de Réquin and the Ailefroide."

In 1953, Dibona's daughter Antonia opened a refuge near the Tofana and named it after him. The Rifugio Tarditi, named after the Italian section commander, was already in the same place during the First World War.

In 1976, a monument in the form of a bronze bust was erected to him in a prominent place on the main square of Cortina, the place mentioned later "Piazza Angelo Dibona". At the inauguration, Luis Trenker said: “He was the most famous and successful mountain guide of his time, perhaps the most universal. No other Dolomite guide can show similar achievements, and there will soon be none among the young who will match him in human size ... " In 2006 there was a large exhibition in Cortina about the achievements and first ascents of Dibona. In an interview in 2009 Reinhold Messner explicitly described Angelo Dibona as one of the greatest Austrian mountaineers. In 2013 a large mandala in honor of Angelo Dibona was made in memory in Cortina by an artist with locals and children.

== Notable first ascents ==
- Campanile Dibona (west peak, 2,550 m (8,370 ft), Monte Cristallo, 1908—solo)
- Oberbachernturm-Nordwand/Torre Fiscalina (Sexten Dolomites, 27 July 1909—with L. Rizzi, Guido Mayer, Max Mayer)
- Einser/Cima Una (north face, Sexten Dolomites, 18 July 1910—with L. Rizzi, Guido Mayer, Max Mayer)
- Südlicher Zwölfer/Croda dei Toni (2,945 m (9,662 ft), Sexten Dolomites, 22 July 1910—with L. Rizzi, Guido Mayer, Max Mayer)
- Campanile Rosa (Tofane, 17 August 1910)
- Tofana di Rozes (south-south-west, 3,225 m (10,581 ft), Tofane, 3 September 1930—with L. Apollonio and P.L. Edwards)
- Punta Michele (north face, 2,898 m (9,508 ft), Piz Popena, 1944—at age 65)
