= Aiguille Dibona =

Mountain in French Alps

- Pain de Sucre du Soreiller
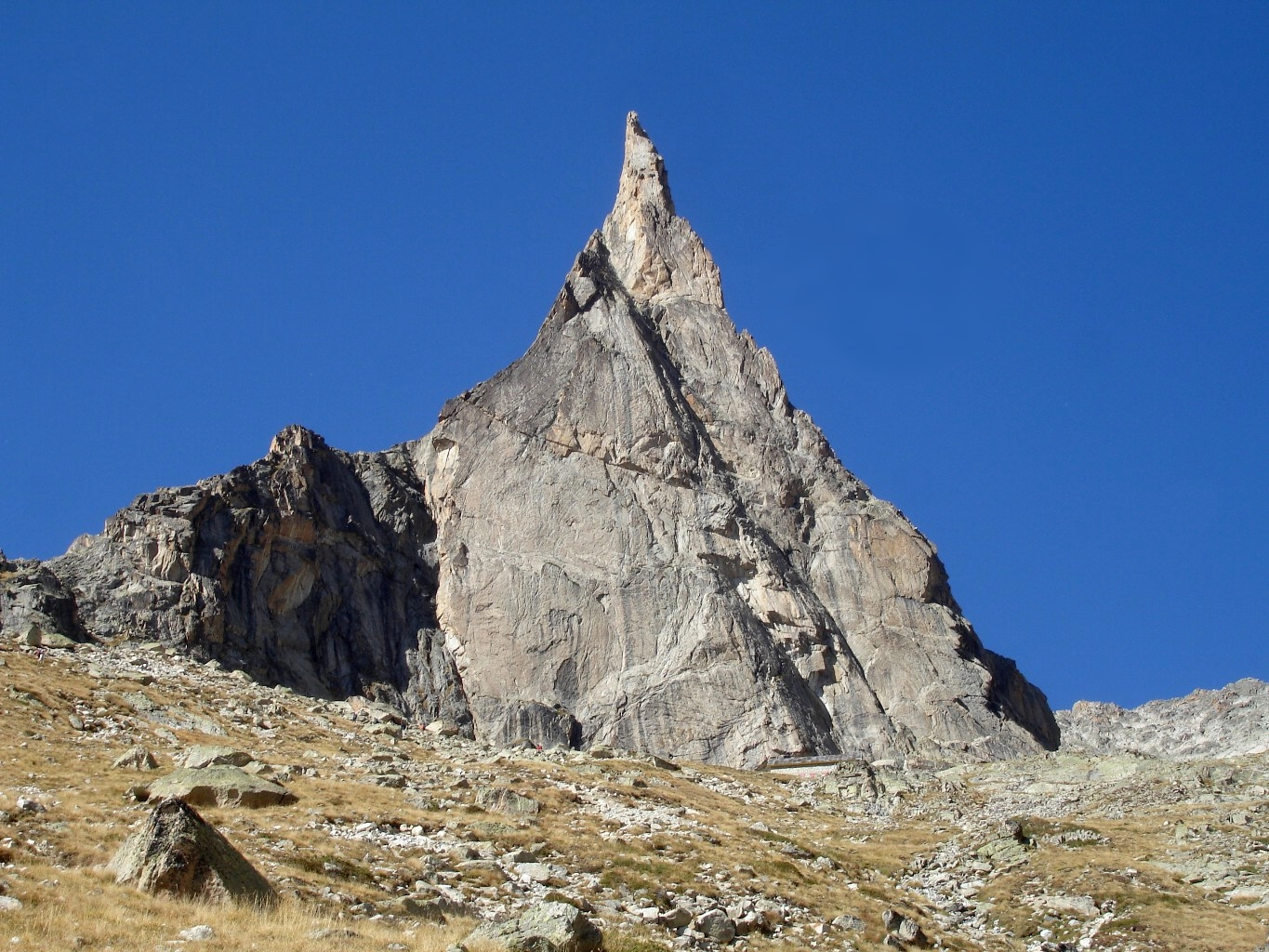

Highest point
- Elevation: 3,130 m (10,270 ft)
- Prominence: 51 m (167 ft)
- Coordinates: 44°57′45″N 6°14′34″E

Geography
- Location within France
- Location: Hautes-Alpes, France
- Parent range: Massif des Écrins, French Alps

Climbing
- First ascent: Angelo Dibona and Guido Mayer, 27 June 1913

The Aiguille Dibona, formerly called (Aiguille du) Pain de Sucre du Soreiller (3,130 m (10,269 ft)), is a mountain in the Massif des Écrins in the French Alps notable for its "astonishing triangular granite spear."

Because of its singular shape, ease of access, and the exceptional quality of its granite, the many routes on the mountain are among the most popular in the Écrins. Formerly called Pain de Sucre du Soreiller, it was renamed for Angelo Dibona, the Dolomites guide and mountaineer, who made the first ascent of the mountain on 27 June 1913 with Guido Mayer. At the foot of the mountain is the refuge du Soreiller, accessible in 3h30m from the village of Étages.

== Climbing routes ==
The main climbing routes are:

- Normal and historical route: PD (peu difficile), The last section of the route can be replaced by a more challenging route variant consisting in 8 pitches of climb at IV (UIAA grade).
- On the south face are the most popular routes:
  - Voie des Savoyards (14 pitches, 6a max but 5c compulsory, partially bolted)
  - Voie Madier (15 pitches, 6a+, partially bolted)
  - Visite obligatoire (12 pitches, 6a sustained, well bolted)
  - Voie Berthet-Boell-Stoefer (15 pitches, 5b, partially bolted)
- The east and west faces are less frequented
