= Saint-Christophe-en-Oisans =

- Commune
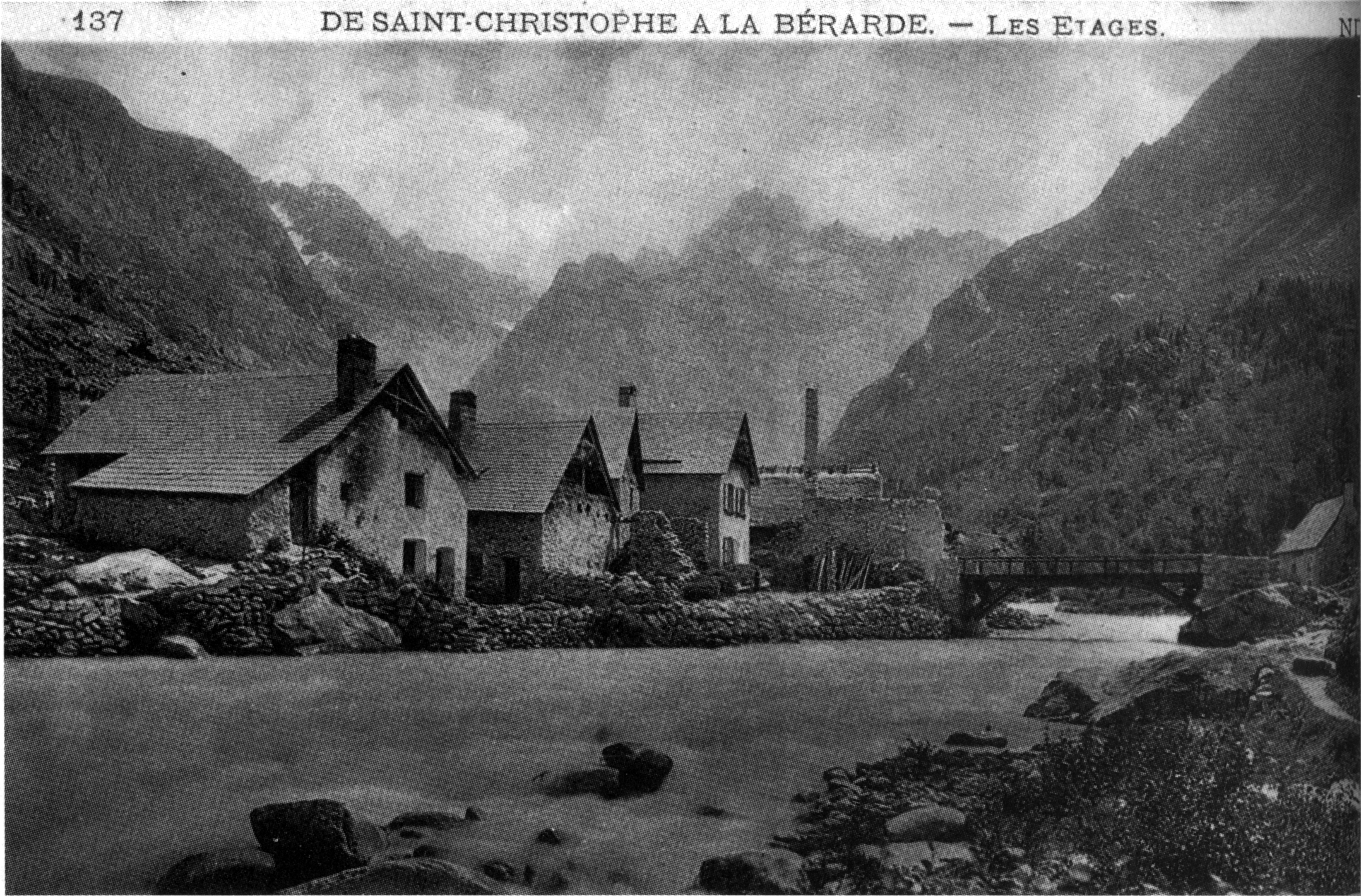
- Saint-Christophe-en-Oisans around 1935
- Location of Saint-Christophe-en-Oisans
- Location within France Location within Auvergne-Rhône-Alpes
- Coordinates: 44°57′28″N 6°10′40″E
- Country: France
- Region: Auvergne-Rhône-Alpes
- Department: Isère
- Arrondissement: Grenoble
- Canton: Oisans-Romanche

Government
  - Mayor (2020–2026): Jean-Louis Arthaud
- Area^{1}: 123.5 km^{2} (47.7 sq mi)
- Elevation: 1,470 m (4,820 ft)
- Highest elevation: 4,008 m (13,150 ft)
- Lowest elevation: 1,168 m (3,832 ft)
- Population (2023): 99
  - Density: 0.80/km^{2} (2.1/sq mi)
- Time zone: UTC+01:00 (CET)
  - Summer (DST): UTC+02:00 (CEST)
- INSEE/Postal code: 38375 /38520
- ^{1} French Land Register data, which excludes lakes, ponds, glaciers > 1 km^{2} (0.386 sq mi or 247 acres) and river estuaries.

Saint-Christophe-en-Oisans (French pronunciation: [sɛ̃ kʁistɔf ɑ̃(n‿)wazɑ̃], lit. 'Saint-Christophe in Oisans') is a commune in the Isère department in southeastern France.

== Climate ==
Climate data for St-Christophe, 1570m (1991−2018 normals, extremes 1964−2018)
Month	Jan	Feb	Mar	Apr	May	Jun	Jul	Aug	Sep	Oct	Nov	Dec	Year
Record high °C (°F)	14.0 (57.2)	15.0 (59.0)	17.5 (63.5)	21.0 (69.8)	25.0 (77.0)	29.0 (84.2)	33.0 (91.4)	31.2 (88.2)	26.0 (78.8)	24.0 (75.2)	19.0 (66.2)	16.0 (60.8)	33.0 (91.4)
Mean daily maximum °C (°F)	2.6 (36.7)	2.9 (37.2)	6.7 (44.1)	10.3 (50.5)	14.7 (58.5)	18.7 (65.7)	21.3 (70.3)	20.7 (69.3)	15.8 (60.4)	11.8 (53.2)	6.2 (43.2)	3.2 (37.8)	11.2 (52.2)
Daily mean °C (°F)	−1.0 (30.2)	−1.1 (30.0)	2.3 (36.1)	5.5 (41.9)	9.7 (49.5)	13.5 (56.3)	15.7 (60.3)	15.5 (59.9)	11.3 (52.3)	7.7 (45.9)	2.7 (36.9)	−0.2 (31.6)	6.8 (44.2)
Mean daily minimum °C (°F)	−4.5 (23.9)	−5.2 (22.6)	−2.1 (28.2)	0.7 (33.3)	4.7 (40.5)	8.2 (46.8)	10.2 (50.4)	10.3 (50.5)	6.8 (44.2)	3.7 (38.7)	−0.8 (30.6)	−3.6 (25.5)	2.4 (36.3)
Record low °C (°F)	−24.0 (−11.2)	−22.0 (−7.6)	−22.0 (−7.6)	−13.0 (8.6)	−6.5 (20.3)	−2.5 (27.5)	1.0 (33.8)	0.0 (32.0)	−3.0 (26.6)	−9.0 (15.8)	−15.0 (5.0)	−19.0 (−2.2)	−24.0 (−11.2)
Average precipitation mm (inches)	74.5 (2.93)	58.0 (2.28)	67.4 (2.65)	70.4 (2.77)	86.2 (3.39)	84.4 (3.32)	71.9 (2.83)	85.7 (3.37)	88.2 (3.47)	116.9 (4.60)	110.5 (4.35)	89.5 (3.52)	1,003.6 (39.48)
Average precipitation days (≥ 1.0 mm)	9.8	8.0	8.7	9.4	11.9	10.7	8.3	8.9	8.5	9.7	10.1	10.3	114.3
Source: Meteociel

== Population ==
Historical population
Year	Pop.	±% p.a.
1968	91	—
1975	74	−2.91%
1982	103	+4.84%
1990	103	+0.00%
1999	106	+0.32%
2007	134	+2.97%
2012	105	−4.76%
2017	107	+0.38%
2023	99	−1.29%
Source: INSEE

== See also ==
- Communes of the Isère department
