= Matterhorn =

Mountain in the Swiss and Italian Alps

- Cervino (Italian); Cervin (French)
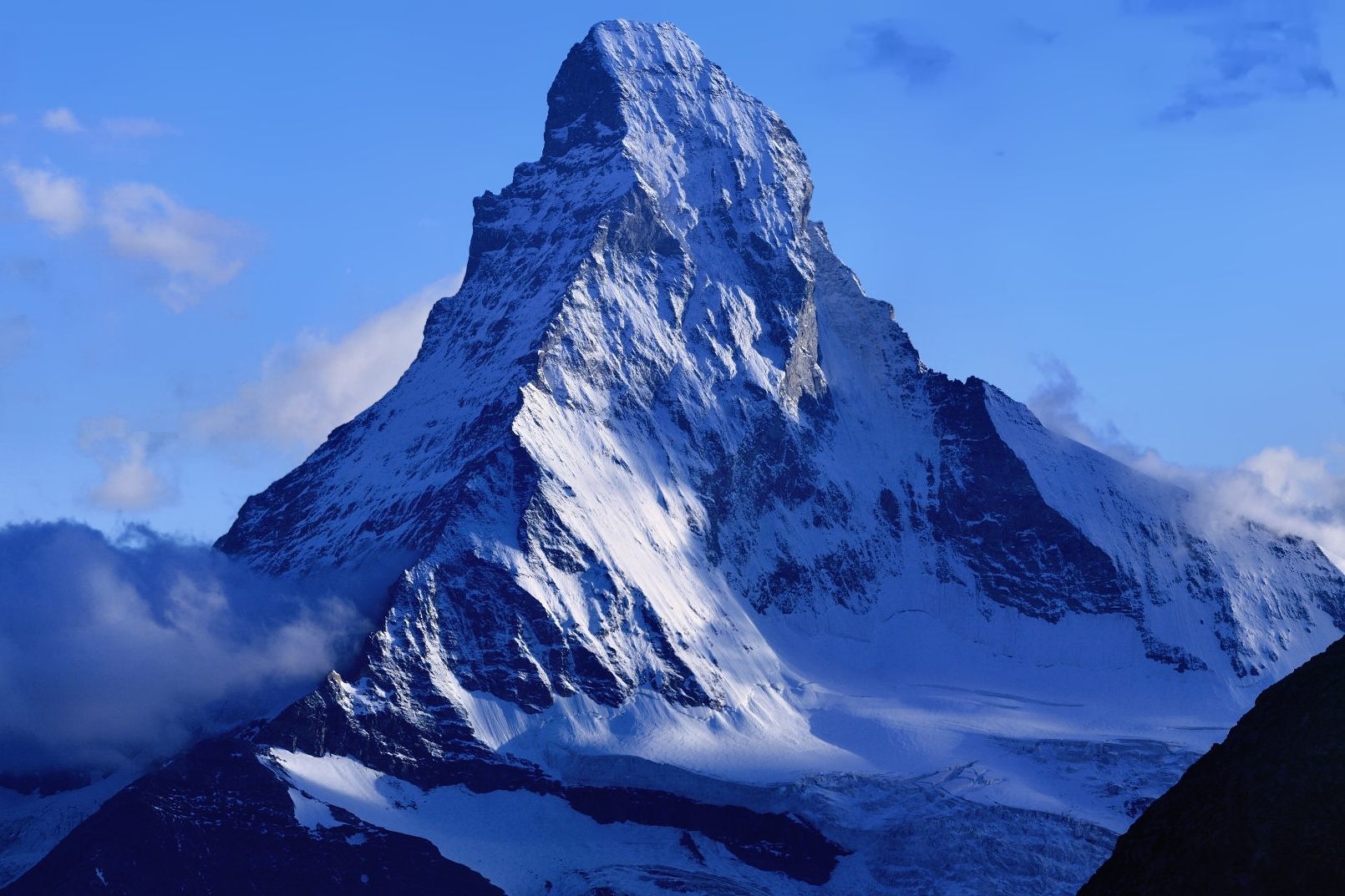
- East and north faces of the Matterhorn, in Switzerland

Highest point
- Elevation: 4,478 m (14,692 ft)
- Prominence: 1,043 m (3,422 ft) ↓ Col Durand (Note: Despite its prominence in a local sense, the Matterhorn is not among the top 100 mountains in the Alps measured by topographic prominence. Its close neighbours Monte Rosa, the Dom, Liskamm, and the Weisshorn have higher summits. See a panoramic photograph Archived 2013-05-10 at the Wayback Machine of the view from Finsteraarhorn, to the north. The key col is Col Durand, at 3,435 metres (11,270 ft), between the Matterhorn and the Weisshorn.)
- Parent peak: Weisshorn
- Isolation: 13.8 km (8.6 mi) → Liskamm-West Top (Note: Retrieved from Google Earth. The nearest point of higher elevation is the Western Liskamm.)
- Listing: Alpine four-thousanders Great north faces of the Alps
- Coordinates: 45°58′35″N 7°39′31″E

Naming
- Native name: Gran Bèca (Arpitan); Horu (Walser)
- English translation: (German) "Peak of the Meadows" (Arpitan) "Great Mountain" (French) "Wooded mountain"

Geography
- Location within Alps
- Location of the Matterhorn Location in the Alps
- Location: Valais, Switzerland; Aosta Valley, Italy
- Parent range: Pennine Alps
- Topo map: swisstopo 1347 Matterhorn

Climbing
- First ascent: 14 July 1865 by; Edward Whymper; Charles Hudson; Francis Douglas; Douglas Robert Hadow; Michel Croz; Peter Taugwalder (father); Peter Taugwalder (son)
- Easiest route: Hörnli ridge (AD, rock/mixed climb)

The Matterhorn (Note: German: [ˈmatɐˌhɔʁn], Swiss Standard German: [ˈmatərˌhɔrn]; Italian: Cervino [tʃerˈviːno]; French: Cervin [sɛʁvɛ̃]; Romansh: Mont(e) Cervin(u) (depending on the dialect) or Matterhorn [mɐˈtɛrorn]; Arpitan: Gran Bèca; Walser: Horu.) is a mountain of the Alps, straddling the main watershed and border between Switzerland and Italy. (Note: Although straddling the Swiss-Italian border, most of the mountain lies within Swiss territory.) It is a large, near-symmetric pyramidal peak in the extended Monte Rosa area of the Pennine Alps, whose summit is 4,478 metres (14,692 ft) above sea level, making it one of the highest summits in the Alps and Europe. (Note: Considering summits with at least 300 metres prominence, it is the 6th highest in the Alps and Europe outside the Caucasus Mountains.) Sometimes referred to as the "Mountain of Mountains" (German: Berg der Berge), the Matterhorn has become an emblem of Switzerland and of the Alps as a whole. It has also been described as the most beautiful mountain in the world and has been claimed to be the most photographed mountain in the world.

The Matterhorn has four faces, each roughly oriented toward one of the four cardinal points. Three of these (north, east, and west) are on the Swiss side of the border and watershed, while the south face lies on the Italian side. These four steep faces, rising above the surrounding glaciers, are separated by the Hörnli, Furggen, Zmutt, and Leone (Lion) ridges. The mountain overlooks the Swiss town of Zermatt, in the canton of Valais, to the northeast, and the Italian town of Breuil-Cervinia in the Aosta Valley to the south. Just east of the Matterhorn is Theodul Pass, the main passage between the two valleys on its north and south sides, which has been a trade route since the Roman era.

The Matterhorn was studied by Horace-Bénédict de Saussure in the late 18th century; this was followed by other renowned naturalists and artists, such as John Ruskin, in the 19th century. It remained unclimbed after most of the other great Alpine peaks had been attained and became the subject of an international competition for the summit. The first ascent of the Matterhorn was in 1865 from Zermatt by a party led by Edward Whymper, but during the descent, a sudden fall claimed the lives of four of the seven climbers. This disaster, later portrayed in several films, marked the end of the golden age of alpinism. The north face was not climbed until 1931 and is among the three biggest north faces of the Alps, known as "The Trilogy". The west face, the highest of the Matterhorn's four faces, was completely climbed only in 1962. It is estimated that over 500 alpinists have died on the Matterhorn, making it one of the deadliest peaks in the world.

The Matterhorn is mainly composed of gneisses (originally fragments of the African plate before the Alpine orogeny) from the Dent Blanche nappe, lying over ophiolites and sedimentary rocks of the Penninic nappes. The mountain's current shape is the result of cirque erosion due to multiple glaciers diverging from the peak, such as the Matterhorn Glacier at the base of the north face. Since the end of the 19th century, when railways were built in the area, the mountain has attracted increasing numbers of visitors and climbers. Each year, numerous mountaineers try to climb the Matterhorn from the Hörnli Hut via the northeast Hörnli ridge, the most popular route to the summit. Many trekkers also undertake the 10-day-long circuit around the mountain. The Matterhorn has been part of the Swiss Federal Inventory of Natural Monuments since 1983.

== Names ==
The name Matterhorn derives from the German words Matte ("meadow") and Horn ("horn"), and is often translated as "the peak of the meadows".

In the Schalbetter map, printed by Sebastian Münster in 1545, the valley is labelled Mattertal, but the mountain has the Latin name Mons Silvius as well as the German name Augstalberg, in concord with the Aosta Valley (German Augstal). The 1548 map by Johannes Stumpf gives only Mons Silvius.

The French name Cervin, from which the Italian term Cervino derives, stems from the Latin Mons Silvanus (or Mons Sylvanus), where silva means "forest"; this was corrupted to Selvin and then Servin. The change of the first letter "s" to "c" is attributed to Horace Bénédict de Saussure, who thought the word was related to "deer" (French: cerf and Italian: cervo).

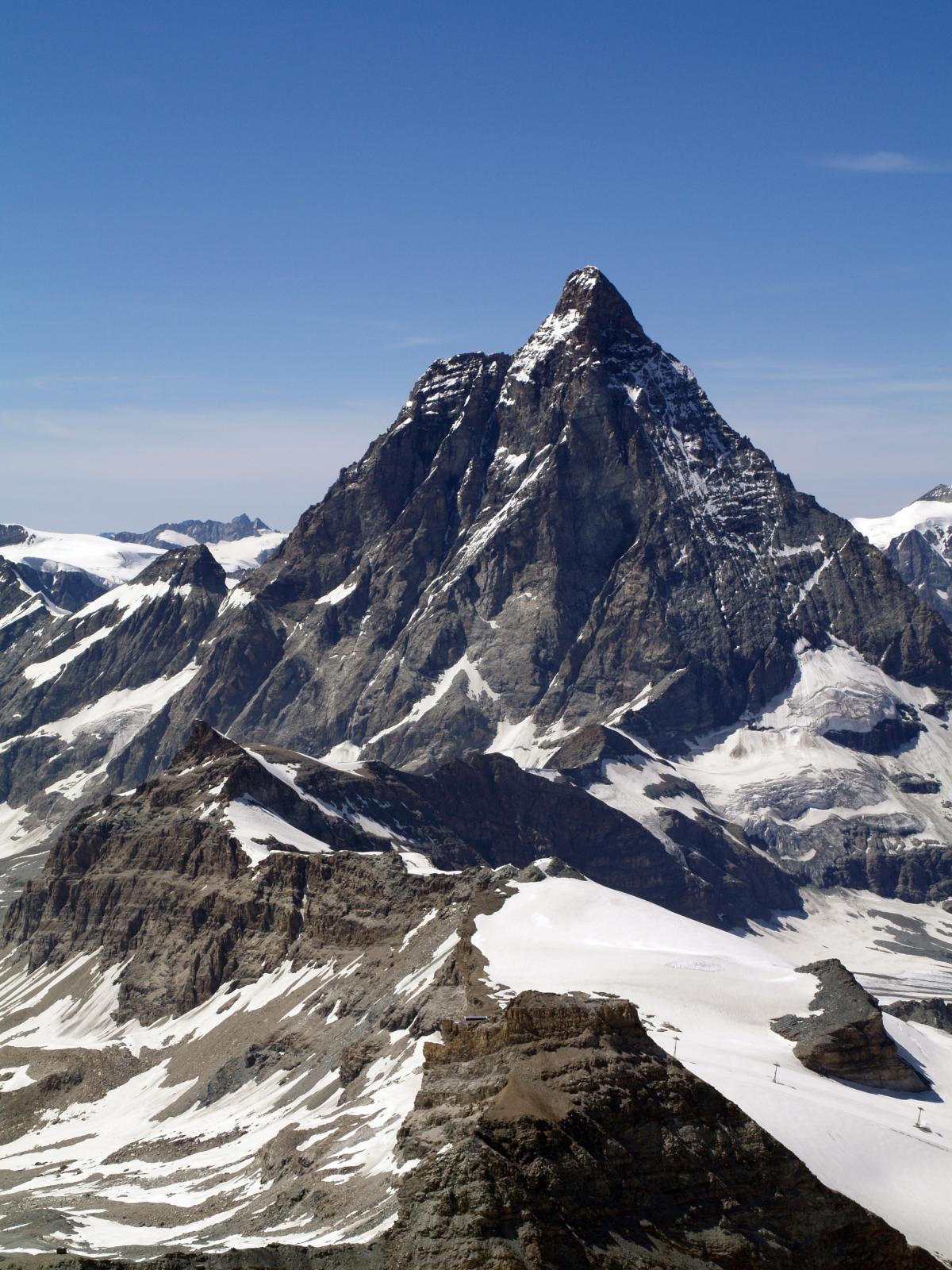
View on the south and east faces and the area of the Theodul Pass between Italy (left) and Switzerland (right)

Josias Simler hypothesised in De Alpibus Commentarius (1574) that the name Mons Silvius derived from a Roman leader, a hypothesis that T. G. Farinetti readopted: "Silvius was probably a Roman leader who sojourned with his legions in the land of the Salassi and the Seduni, and perhaps crossed the Theodul Pass between these two places. This Silvius may have been that same Servius Galba whom Caesar charged with the opening up of the Alpine passes, which from that time onward traders have been wanting to cross with great danger and grave difficulty. Servius Galba, in order to carry out Caesar's orders, came with his legions from Allobroges (Savoy) to Octodurum (Martigny) in the Valais, and pitched his camp there. The passes which he had orders to open from there could be no other than the St. Bernard, the Simplon, the Theodul, and the Moro; it therefore seems likely that the name of Servius, whence Silvius and later Servin, or Cervin, was given in his honour to the famous pyramid." It is unknown when the new name of Servin, or Cervin, replaced the old, from which it seems to be derived.

The Matterhorn is also named Gran Bècca ("big mountain") by the Valdôtains and Horu by the local Walliser German speaking people.

The German name "Matterhorn" first appears in the year 1682.

Because of its recognisable shape, many other similar mountains around the world were named or nicknamed "the Matterhorn of" their respective countries or mountain ranges.

== Height ==
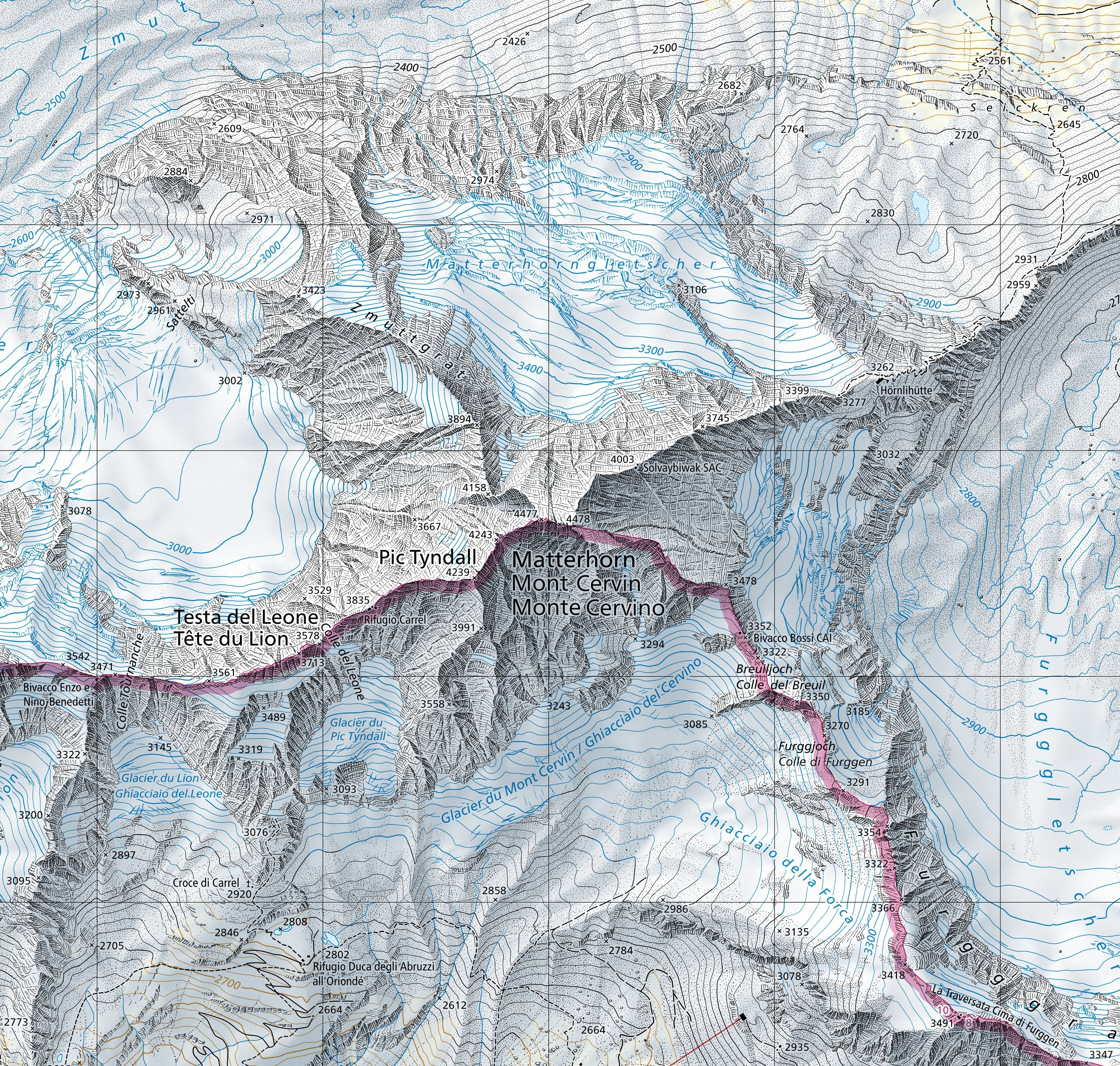
The Matterhorn on a national map of Switzerland

The Matterhorn has two distinct summits, situated at either end of a 100-metre-long (330 ft) exposed rocky crest which forms the Italian/Swiss border. In August 1792, the Genevan geologist and explorer Horace Bénédict de Saussure made the first measurement of the Matterhorn's height, using a sextant and a 50-foot-long (15 m) chain spread out on the Theodul glacier. He calculated its height as 4,501.7 m (14,769 ft). In 1868 the Italian engineer Felice Giordano measured a height of 4,505 m (14,780 ft) by means of a mercury barometer, which he had taken to the summit. The Dufour map, which was afterward followed by the Italian surveyors, gave 4,482 m (14,705 ft) as the height of the Swiss summit.

In 1999, the summit height was precisely determined to be at 4,477.54 m (14,690 ft) above sea level by using Global Positioning System technology as part of the TOWER Project (Top of the World Elevations Remeasurement) and to an accuracy of less than one centimetre, which allows future changes to be tracked.

The topographic prominence of the Matterhorn is 1,042 metres (3,419 ft) as the ridge connecting it with a higher summit (in this case the Weisshorn, which is the culminating point of the range west of the Mattertal valley) sinks to a height of 3,436 m (11,273 ft) at the Col Durand, a saddle between the Pointe de Zinal and the Mont Durand. The topographic isolation is 13.9 km (8.6 mi), as the nearest point of higher elevation is the one-metre (3 ft 3 in) higher Western Liskamm. Considering mountains with a topographic prominence of at least 300 m (980 ft), the Matterhorn is the sixth-highest summit in the Alps and Europe outside the Caucasus Mountains. It is the fifth-highest summit of Valais and Switzerland and the third-highest summit of the Aosta Valley and Italy. Locally, it is the third-highest summit in the municipality of Zermatt and the highest summit in the municipality of Valtournenche. On the official International Climbing and Mountaineering Federation list of Alpine four-thousanders, which also includes subsidiary summits of higher mountains such as the nearby Monte Rosa, the Matterhorn is the 12th highest summit in the Alps.

Height measurements by year
1792 (Saussure's Travels in the Alps)	1862 (Dufour Map)	1868 (Giordano)	1880 (Siegfried Map)	1934 (S. M.)	1946 (National Map)	1999 (TOWER)	2010 (N. M.)
4,501.7 m (2309.75 T)	4,482 m	4,505 m	4,482 m	4,481 m	4,477.5 m	4,477.54 m	4,478 m

== Geography ==
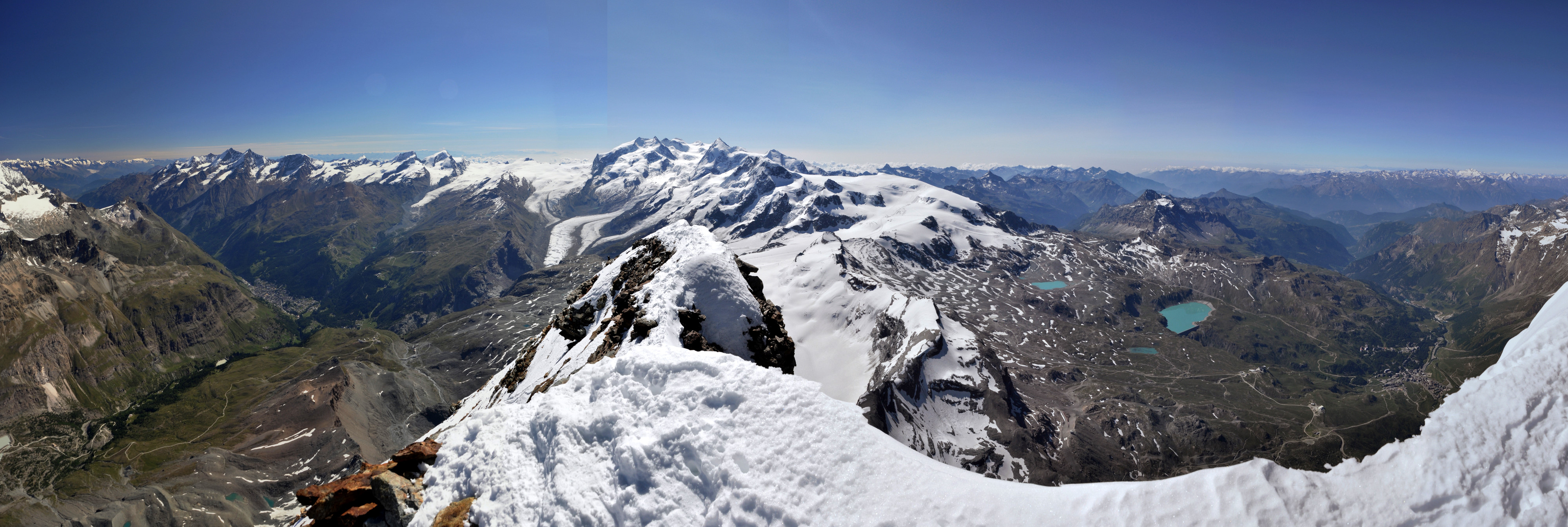
View from the summit towards Monte Rosa with the valleys of Mattertal (left) and Valtournenche (right)

The Matterhorn has a pyramidal shape with four faces nearly facing the four compass points. Three of them (north, east and west) are on the Swiss side of the border and watershed (Mattertal valley), and one of them (south) is on the Italian side of the border (Valtournenche valley). The north face overlooks the Ober Gabelhorn (7 km away) across the Zmutt Glacier and valley (above Zermatt), the east face overlooks the Gorner Glacier system between the Gornergrat and Monte Rosa (respectively 10 and 17 km away) across the Theodul Pass, the west face overlooks the upper basin of the Zmutt Glacier between the Dent Blanche and the Dent d'Hérens (respectively 7 and 4 km away) and the south face fronts the resort town of Breuil-Cervinia and overlooks a good portion of the Valtournenche. The Matterhorn does not form a perfect square pyramid, as the north and south faces are wider than the west and east faces. Moreover, the latter faces do not actually meet on the summit but are connected by a 100-metre (330 ft)-long horizontal west–east ridge between the north and south faces.

The Matterhorn's faces are steep, and only small patches of snow and ice cling to them; regular avalanches send the snow down to accumulate on the glaciers at the base of each face, the largest of which are the Tiefmattengletscher to the west, part of the Zmutt Glacier, and the Matterhorn Glacier to the north. Smaller glaciers lie at the base of the south face (the Lower Matterhorn Glacier) and the east face (unnamed). In this area, the border between Switzerland and Italy coincides with the main Alpine watershed, separating the drainage basin of the Rhone on the north (Mediterranean Sea) and that of the Po on the south (Adriatic Sea). The north side is drained by the Zmuttbach (west and north faces) and the Gornera through the Furggbach (east face), tributaries of the Rhone through the (Matter) Vispa. The Marmore torrent drains the south side and face, a tributary of the Po through the Dora Baltea (or Doire baltée). The Theodul Pass, located on the watershed between the Matterhorn and the Breithorn, at 3,295 metres, is the easiest passage between the two valleys and countries (the slightly lower Furggjoch not being used as a pass). The pass was used as a crossover and trade route for the Romans and the Romanised Celtic population Salassi between 100 BCE and 400 CE. The area is now heavily glaciated and covered on the north side by the Theodul Glacier.

Well-known faces are the east and north, visible from the area of Zermatt, although mostly hidden from the Mattertal by the chain of the Weisshorn. The east face is 1,000 metres high and, because it is "a long, monotonous slope of rotten rocks", presents a high risk of rockfall, making its ascent dangerous. The north face is 1,200 metres high and is one of the most dangerous north faces in the Alps, in particular for its risk of rockfall and storms. The south face, well visible from the Valtournenche, is 1,350 metres high and offers many different routes. The west face, the highest at 1,400 metres, has the fewest ascent routes and lies in a more remote area than the other faces.

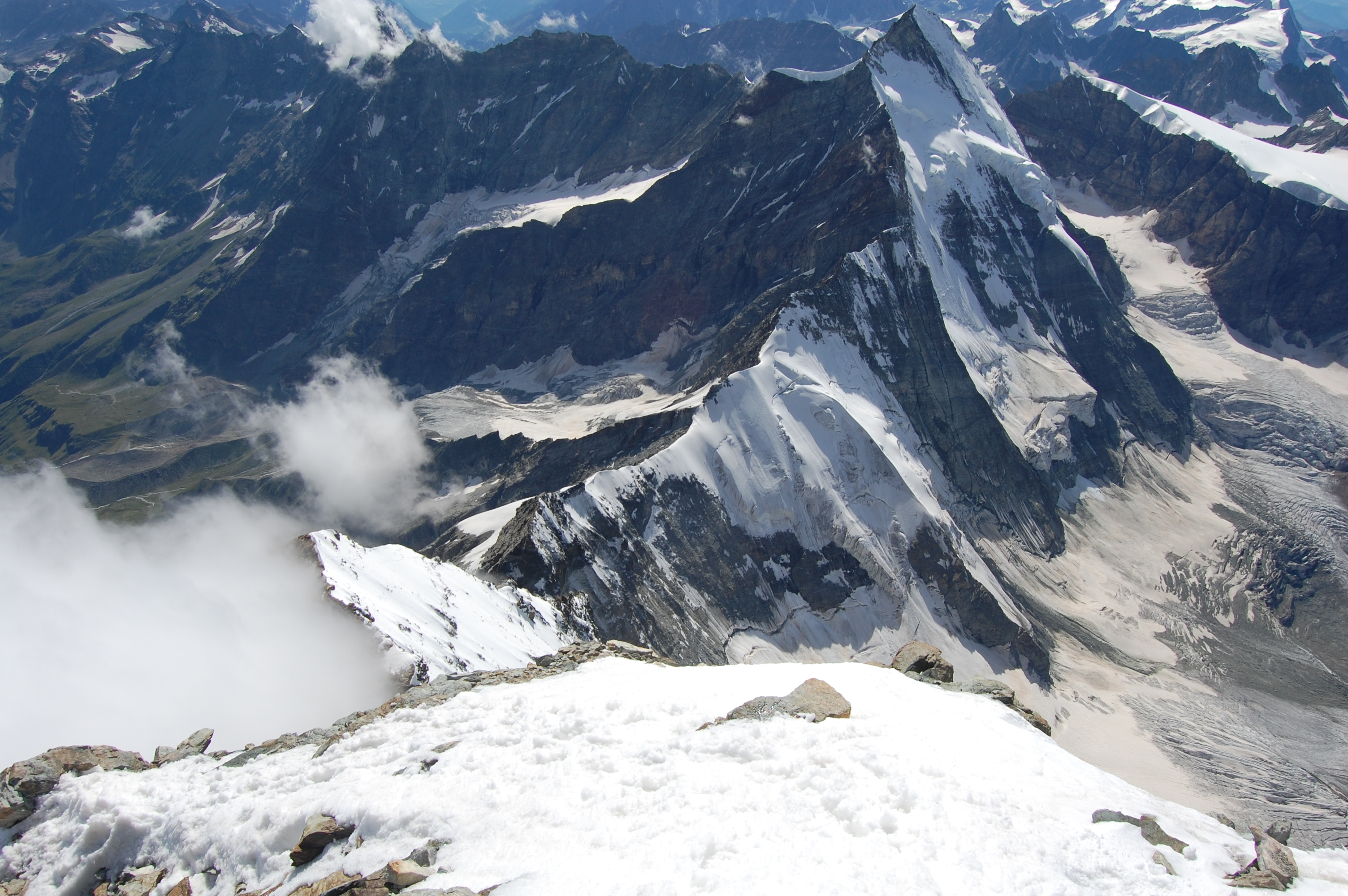
View from the summit towards the west and the nearest other 4,000-metre peak: the Dent d'Hérens

The four main ridges separating the four faces are the main climbing routes. The least difficult technical climb and the usual climbing route, the Hörnli ridge (Hörnligrat), lies between the east and north faces and is aligned towards the Oberrothorn above Zermatt. To its west lies the Zmutt ridge (Zmuttgrat), between the north and west faces and aligned towards the Wandfluehorn; this is, according to Collomb, "the classic route up the mountain, its longest ridge, also the most disjointed." The Lion ridge (Cresta del Leone / Arête du lion), lying between the south and west faces and aligned towards the Dent d'Hérens is the Italian normal route and goes across Pic Tyndall; Collomb comments, "A superb rock ridge, the shortest on the mountain, now draped with many fixed ropes, but a far superior climb compared with the Hörnli." Finally, the south side is separated from the east side by the Furggen ridge (Furggengrat), which is aligned towards the Klein Matterhorn. It is, according to Collomb, "the hardest of the ridges [...] the ridge still has an awesome reputation but is not too difficult in good conditions by the indirect finish".

While the Matterhorn is the culminating point of the Valtournenche on the south, it is only one of the many 4000 metres summits of the Mattertal valley on the north. Its height is exceeded by four major summits: the Weisshorn (4,505 m), the Dom (4,545 m), the Liskamm (4,527 m) and the second-highest in the Alps, Monte Rosa (4,634 m). This section of the Pennine Alps, including the Matterhorn, the Zinalrothorn, the Dent Blanche, the Dent d'Hérens, the Breithorn, the Strahlhorn, the Rimpfischhorn and the Alphubel, concentrates most of western Europe's highest mountains and forms a crown of peaks around Zermatt. The deeply glaciated region between the Matterhorn and Monte Rosa (named Dent Blanche-Matterhorn-Monte Rosa) has been listed in the Federal Inventory of Landscapes and Natural Monuments since 1983.

The four faces of the Matterhorn:

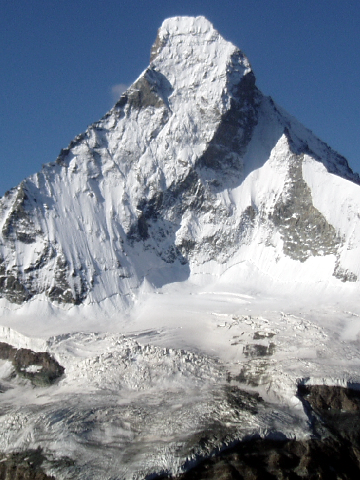
North

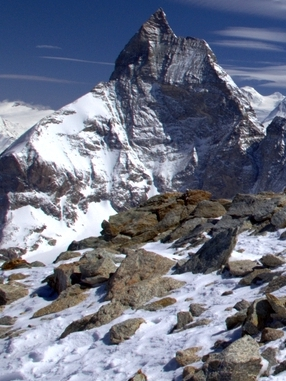
West

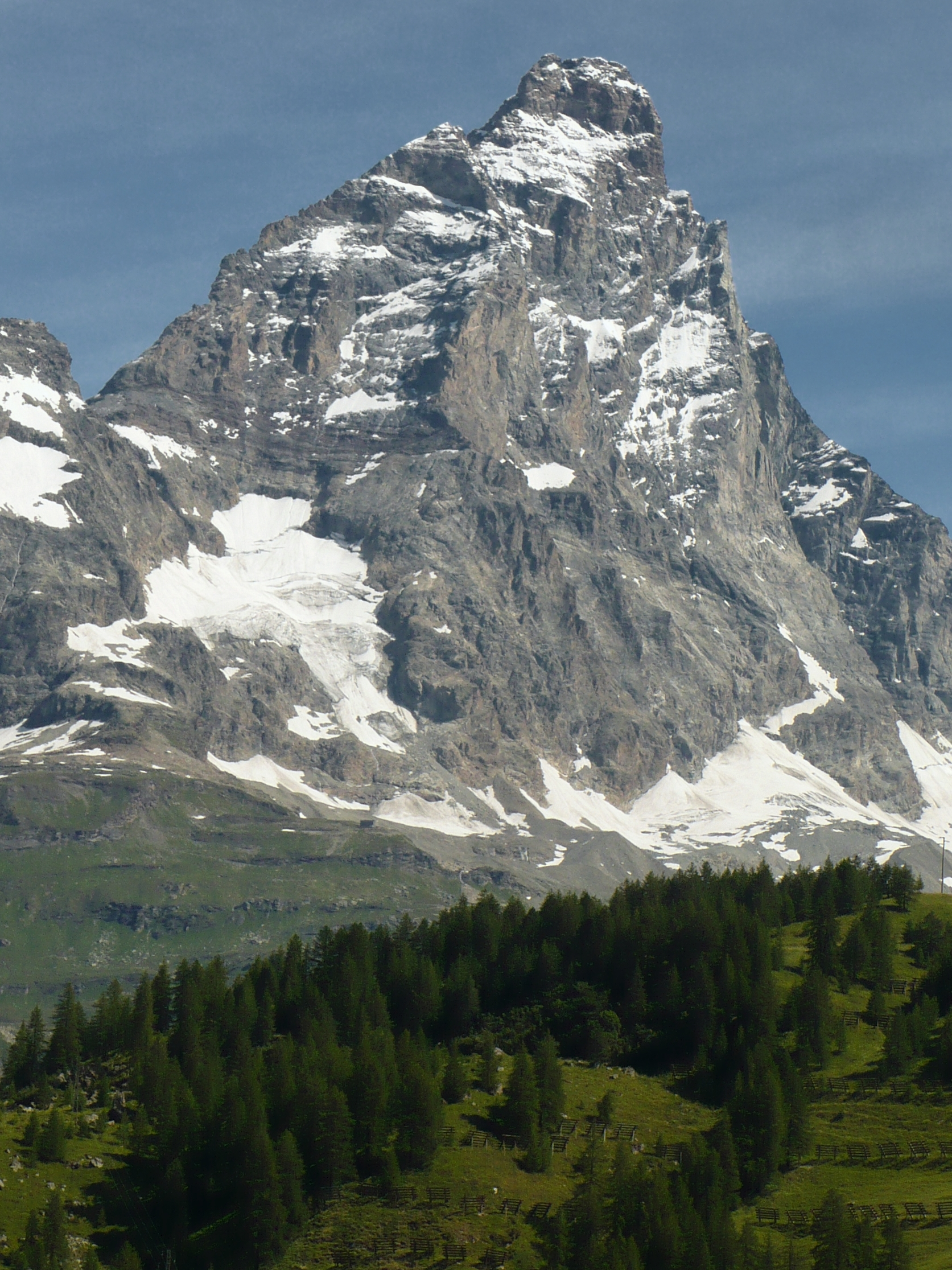
South

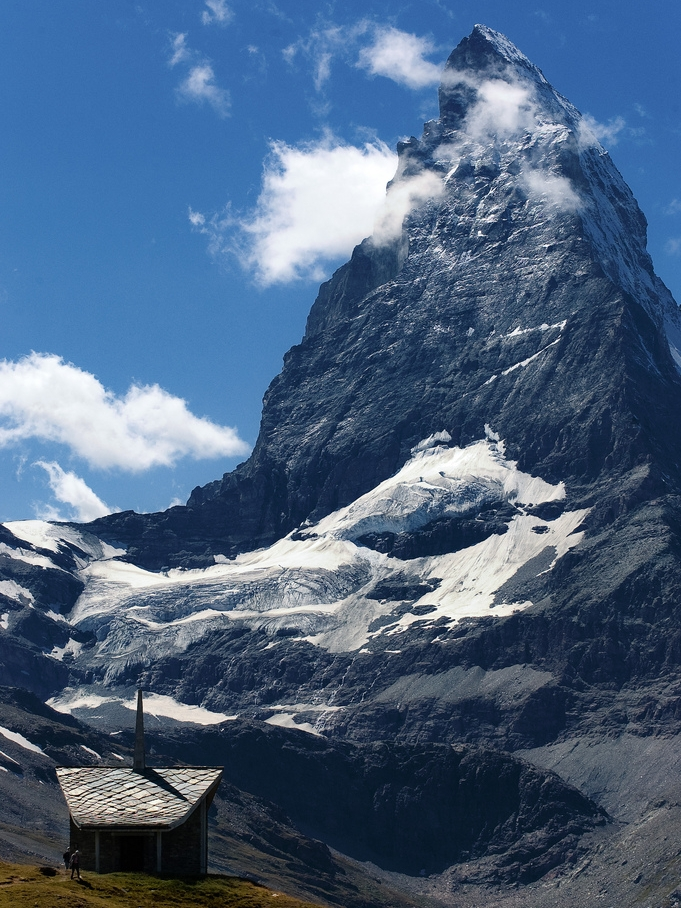
East

Matterhorn simulated orbiting view.

== Weather ==
The Matterhorn is an isolated mountain. Because of its position on the main Alpine watershed and its great height, the Matterhorn is exposed to rapid weather changes. In addition, the steep faces of the mountain and its isolated location make it prone to banner clouds formation, with the air flowing around the mountain producing condensation of the air on the lee side and also creating vortices.

== Geology ==
The Matterhorn's pyramid is composed of Paleozoic rocks, which were thrust over the Matterhorn's Mesozoic base during the Cenozoic. Quaternary glaciation and weathering give the mountain its current shape.

Apart from the base of the mountain, the Matterhorn is composed of gneiss belonging to the Dent Blanche klippe, an isolated part of the Austroalpine nappes, lying over the Penninic nappes. The Austroalpine nappes are part of the Apulian plate, a small continent that broke up from Africa before the Alpine orogeny. For this reason, the Matterhorn has been popularised as an African mountain. The Austroalpine nappes are mostly common in the Eastern Alps.

The Swiss explorer and geologist Horace-Bénédict de Saussure, inspired by the view of the Matterhorn, anticipated modern theories of geology:

What power must have been required to shatter and to sweep away the missing parts of this pyramid; for we do not see it surrounded by heaps of fragments; one only sees other peaks - themselves rooted to the ground - whose sides, equally rent, indicate an immense mass of débris, of which we do not see any trace in the neighbourhood. Doubtless, this is that débris which, in the form of pebbles, boulders, and sand, fills our valleys and our plains.

=== Formation ===
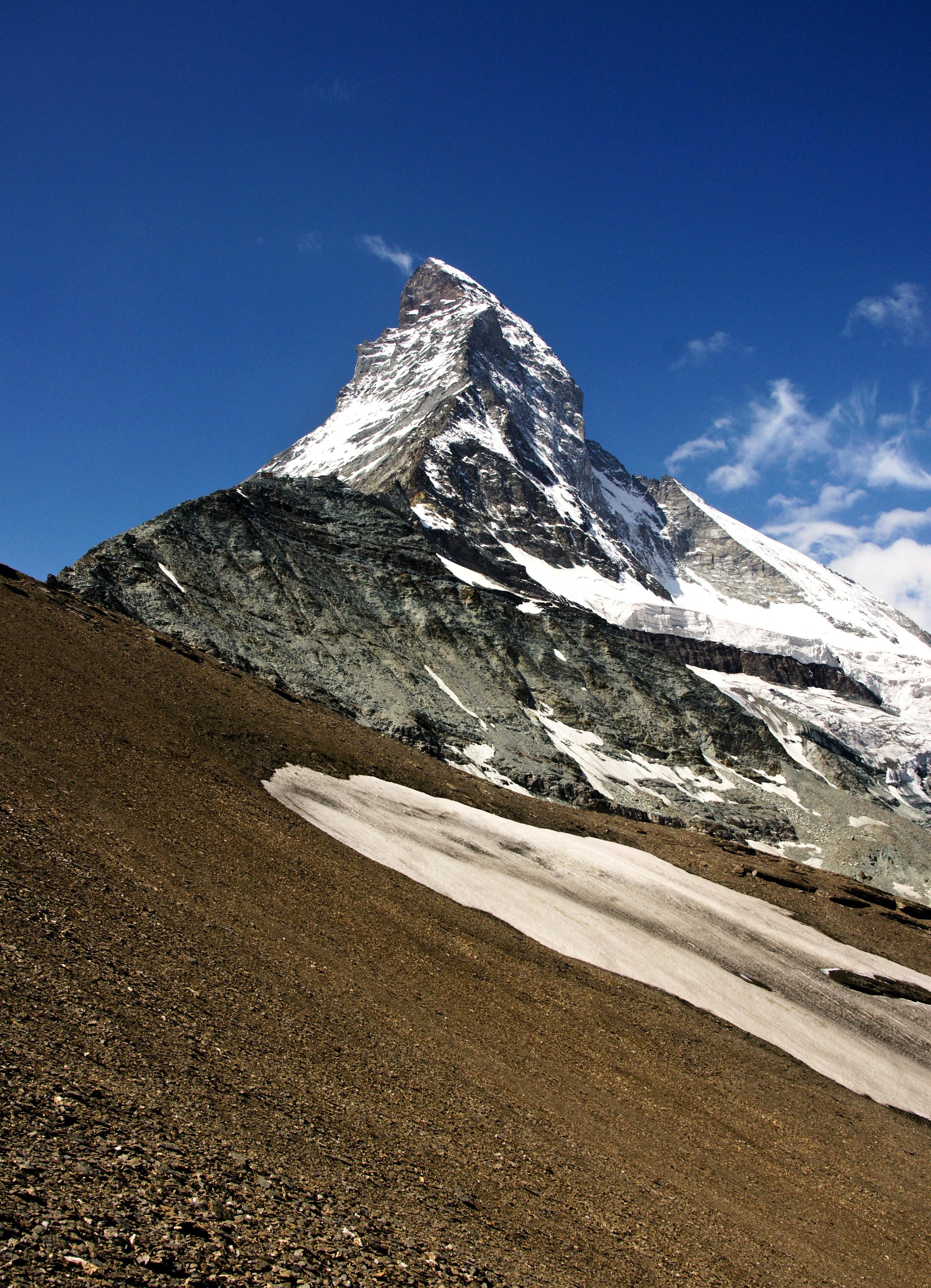
Different layers of rock can be seen: the lower part is sedimentary rock (brown); the middle part is greenschist from the oceanic crust. The peak itself is gneiss from the African continent.

The formation of the Matterhorn (and the whole Alpine range) started with the break-up of the Pangaea continent 200 million years ago into Laurasia (containing Europe) and Gondwana (containing Africa). While the rocks constituting the nearby Monte Rosa remained in Laurasia, the rocks constituting the Matterhorn found themselves in Gondwana, separated by the newly formed Tethys Ocean.

100 million years ago, the extension of the Tethys Ocean stopped, and the Apulian plate broke from Gondwana and moved toward the European continent. This resulted in the closure of the western Tethys by subduction under the Apulian plate (with the Piemont-Liguria Ocean first and Valais Ocean later). The subduction of the oceanic crust left traces still visible today at the base of the Matterhorn (accretionary prism). The orogeny itself began after the end of the oceanic subduction when the European continental crust collided with the Apulian continent, resulting in the formation of nappes.

The Matterhorn acquired its characteristic pyramidal shape in much more recent times, as it was caused by natural erosion over the past million years. At the beginning of the Alpine orogeny, the Matterhorn was only a rounded mountain like a hill. Because its height is above the snowline, its flanks are covered by ice, resulting from the accumulation and compaction of snow. During the warmer period of summer, part of the ice melts and seeps into the bedrock. When it freezes again, it fractures pieces of rock because of its dilatation (freeze-thaw), forming a cirque. Four cirques led to the shape of the mountain.

=== Rocks ===
Most of the base of the mountain lies in the Tsaté nappe, a remnant of the Piedmont-Liguria oceanic crust (ophiolites) and its sedimentary rocks. Up to 3,400 metres the mountain is composed of successive layers of ophiolites and sedimentary rocks. From 3,400 metres to the top, the rocks are gneisses from the Dent Blanche nappe (Austroalpine nappes). They are divided into the Arolla series (below 4,200 m) and the Valpelline zone (the summit). Other mountains in the region (Weisshorn, Zinalrothorn, Dent Blanche, Mont Collon) also belong to the Dent Blanche nappe.

== Tourism and trekking ==
Flight around the Matterhorn

Since the eighteenth century, the Alps have attracted more and more people and fascinated generations of explorers and climbers. The Matterhorn remained relatively little known until 1865. Still, the successful ascent followed by the tragic accident of the expedition led by Edward Whymper caused a rush on the mountains surrounding Zermatt.

The construction of the railway linking the village of Zermatt to the town of Visp started in 1888. The first train reached Zermatt on 18 July 1891, and the entire line was electrified in 1930. Since 1930, the village has been directly connected to St. Moritz by the Glacier Express panoramic train. However, there was no connection with the village of Breuil-Cervinia on the Italian side until 2023. Travellers had to hire mountain guides to cross the 3,300-metre-high glaciated Theodul Pass, separating the two resorts. In 2023, the Matterhorn Alpine Crossing opened via Klein Matterhorn and Testa Grigia, thus connecting the two towns. The town of Zermatt remains almost completely free of internal combustion vehicles and can be reached by public transport only. (Apart from the local police service, which uses a Volkswagen car, and the refuse collection lorry, only electric vehicles are used locally).

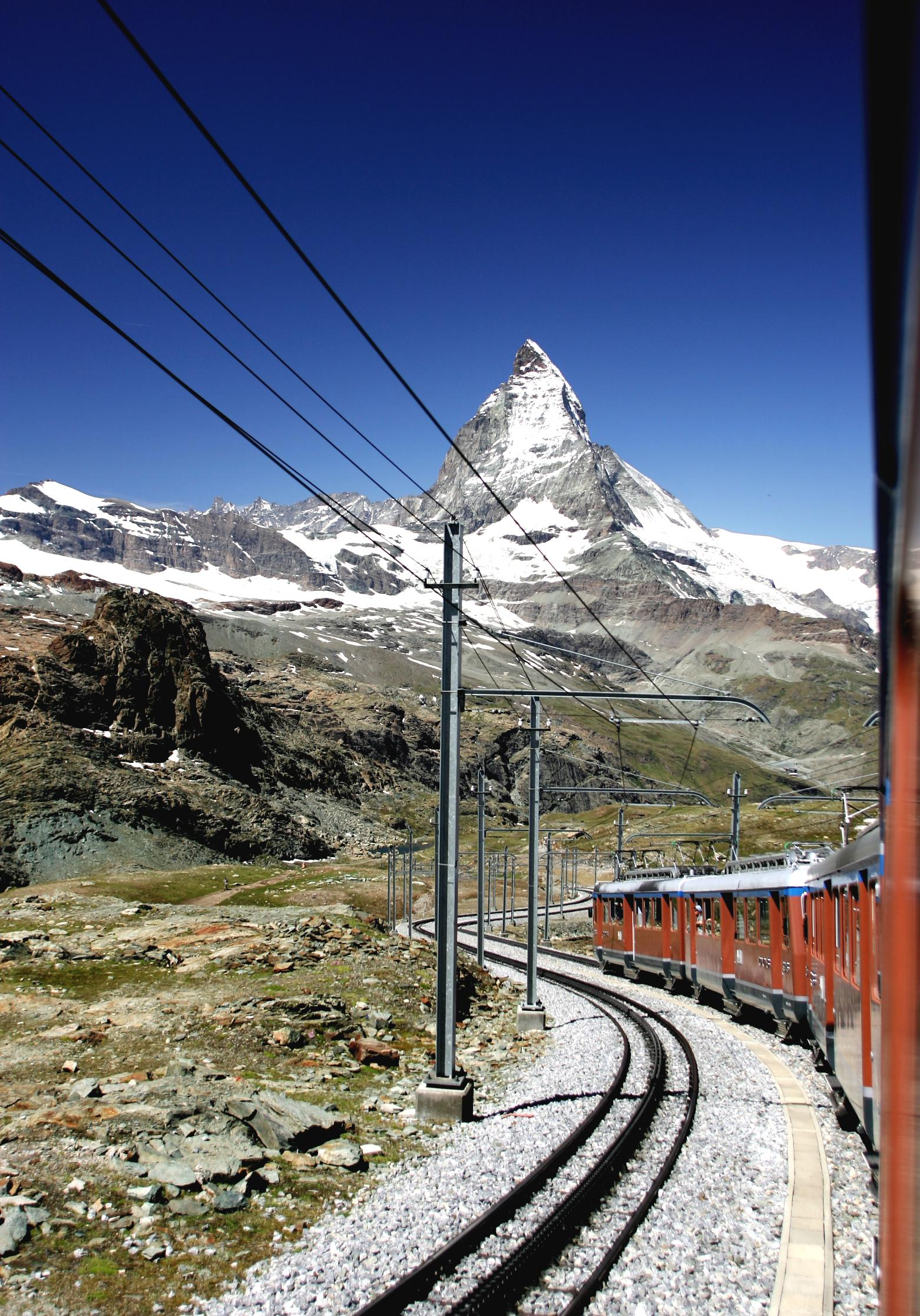
View from the train to the Gornergrat

Rail and cable-car facilities have been built to make some of the summits in the area more accessible. The Gornergrat railway, reaching a record altitude of 3,100 metres, was inaugurated in 1898. Areas served by cable car are the Unterrothorn and the Klein Matterhorn (Little Matterhorn) (3,883 m, highest transportation system in Europe). The Hörnli Hut (3,260 m), which is the start of the normal route via the Hörnli ridge, is easily accessible from Schwarzsee (2,600 m) and is also frequented by hikers. The Zermatt and Breuil-Cervinia resorts function as separate ski resorts all year round and are connected by ski lifts over the Theodul Pass. In 2023, a cable car link between Testa Grigia (or Tête grise) and the Klein Matterhorn opened. It finally provided a direct link between the Swiss and Italian sides of the Matterhorn.

The Matterhorn Museum (Zermatt) relates the general history of the region from alpinism to tourism. In the museum, which is in the form of a reconstituted mountain village, the visitors can relive the first and tragic ascent of the Matterhorn and see the objects that belonged to the protagonists.

Trekkers can complete the Tour of the Matterhorn in about 10 days. Considered by some as one of the most beautiful treks in the Alps, it follows many ancient trails that have linked the Swiss and Italian valleys for centuries. The circuit includes alpine meadows, balcony trails, larch forests and glacial crossings. It connects six valleys embracing three different cultures: the German-speaking high Valais, the French-speaking central Valais and the bilingual French/Italian-speaking Aosta Valley. Good conditions are necessary to circumnavigate the peak. After reaching Zinal from Zermatt by the Augstbord and Meiden passes, the trekker crosses the Col de Sorebois and the Col de Torrent before arriving at Arolla. Then the Arolla Glacier and the Col Collon must be crossed on the way to Prarayer, followed by the Col de Valcournera to Breuil-Cervinia. In the last and highest section, the Theodul Pass must be crossed before returning to Zermatt. In total, seven passes between 2,800 and 3,300 metres must be crossed on relatively difficult terrain.

As of 2015, almost two million visitors arrive at Zermatt annually. An average of around twelve people per year have died on the Matterhorn in the ten years from 2005 to 2015.

== Climbing history ==
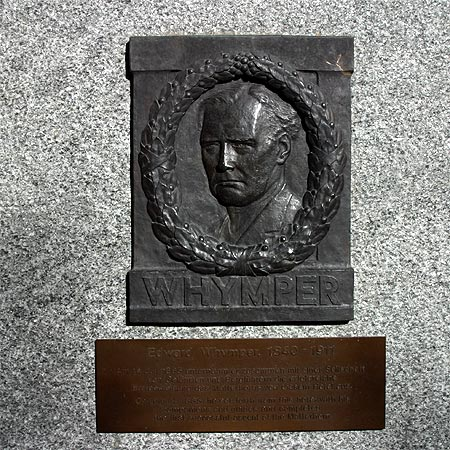
Plaque on the front wall of the Monte Rosa Hotel, commemorating the first ascent by Edward Whymper (Note: "On 14 July 1865, he set forth from this hotel with his companions and guides, and completed the first successful ascent of the Matterhorn.")

The Matterhorn was one of the last of the main Alpine mountains to be ascended, not because of its technical difficulty, but because of the fear it inspired in early mountaineers. The first serious attempts were all from the Italian side, although, despite appearances, the southern routes are technically more difficult. The main figures were Jean-Antoine Carrel and his uncle Jean-Jacques Carrel, from the Valtournenche area, who made the first attempts in 1857 and 1858, reaching 3,800 m (12,500 ft) on the latter occasion. In July 1860, three brothers from Liverpool attempted the mountain, Alfred, Charles and Sandbach Parker, but they turned back at about 3,500 m (11,500 ft). In August of the same year, Jean-Jacques Carrel returned to guide, with Johann Joseph Bennen, Vaughan Hawkins and John Tyndall to about 3,960 m (12,990 ft) before turning back. In 1861 the Carrels managed to reach the Crête du Coq at 4,032 m (13,228 ft). In July 1862, Jean-Antoine, together with César Carrel, accompanied as porters (sic) John Tyndall, Anton Walters and J.J. Bennen to Matterhorn's Shoulder at 4,248 m (13,937 ft), which was subsequently named Pic Tyndall in honor of the client.

Edward Whymper joined the efforts in August 1861, but in his first 7 attempts with a variety of companions could only reach a maximum height of 4,100 m (13,500 ft). However, on 14 July 1865, in what is considered the last ascent of the golden age of alpinism, he was able to reach the summit by an ascent of the Hörnli ridge in Switzerland, guided by the famed French mountaineer Michel Croz and the Swiss father and son Peter Taugwalder Sr. and Jr., and accompanied by the British gentlemen Charles Hudson, Lord Francis Douglas, Douglas Robert Hadow. Upon descent, Hadow, Croz, Hudson and Douglas fell to their deaths on the Matterhorn Glacier, and all but Douglas (whose body was never found) are buried in the Zermatt churchyard.

Just three days later, on 17 July 1865, Jean-Antoine Carrel and Jean-Baptiste Bich reached the summit from the Italian side.

=== Before the first ascent ===
In the summer of 1860, Edward Whymper came across the Matterhorn for the first time. He was an English artist and engraver who a London publisher had hired to make sketches of the mountains in the region of Zermatt. Although the unclimbed Matterhorn had a mixed reputation among British mountaineers, it fascinated Whymper. Whymper's first attempt was in August 1861, from the village of Breuil on the south side. In Châtillon he hired a Swiss guide, who remained anonymous in his accounts, and in Valtournanche he almost hired Jean-Antoine Carrel as well, but, disliking the looks of Carrel's uncle, he changed his mind. The Carrels decided to give Matterhorn a try by themselves again, and caught up with Whymper at nightfall. Whymper now had "a strong inclination to engage the pair; but, finally, decided against it," and the Carrels went alone to reach a new high on Matterhorn of 4,032 m (13,228 ft) the next day. Whymper and his guide camped one more night on the Col du lion (= Col Tournanche) 3,479 m (11,414 ft) and were forced to turn around only an hour above this pass the day after.

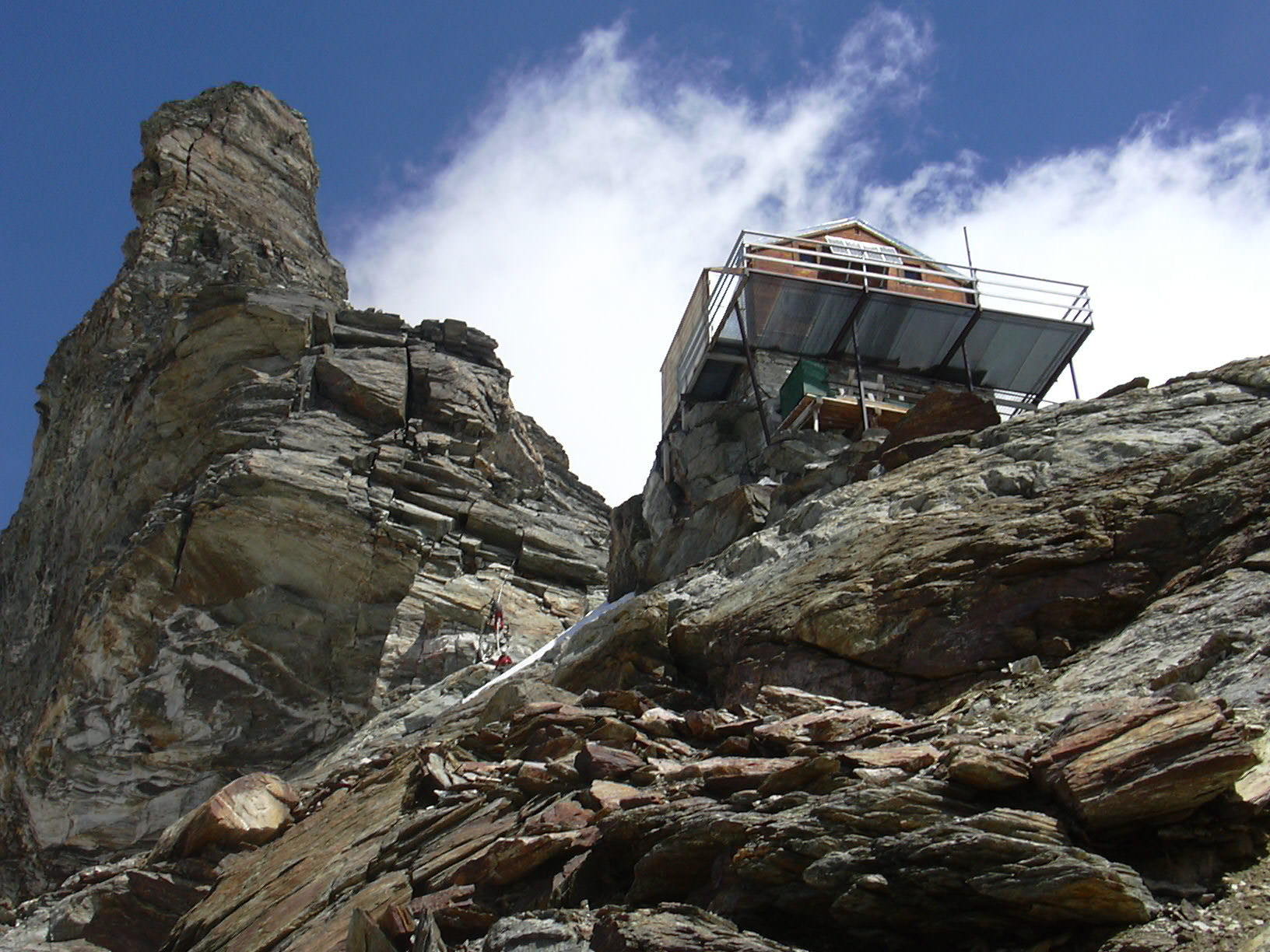
The Carrel Hut (3,830 m) on the Lion ridge

In 1862, Whymper made further attempts, still from the south side, on the Lion ridge (or Italian ridge), where the route seemed easier than the Hörnli ridge (the normal route today). On his own, he reached above 4,000 metres (13,000 ft), but was injured on his way down to Breuil. In July, John Tyndall with Johann Joseph Bennen and another guide overcame most of the difficulties of the ridge that seemed so formidable from below and successfully reached the main shoulder; but at a point not very far below the summit, they were stopped by a deep cleft that defied their utmost efforts. The Matterhorn remained unclimbed.

Whymper returned to Breuil in 1863, persuading Carrel to join forces with him and try the mountain once more via the Italian ridge. On this attempt, however, a storm soon developed, and they were stuck halfway to the summit. They remained there for 26 hours in their tent before giving up. Whymper did not make another attempt for two years.

In the decisive year 1865, Whymper returned with new plans, deciding to attack the Matterhorn via its south face instead of the Italian ridge. On 21 June, Whymper began his ascent with Swiss guides, but halfway up they experienced severe rockfall; although nobody was injured, they decided to give up the ascent. This was Whymper's seventh attempt.

During the following weeks, Whymper spent his time climbing other mountains in the area with his guides, before going back to Breuil on 7 July. Meanwhile, the Italian Alpine Club was founded and its leaders, Felice Giordano and Quintino Sella, established plans to conquer the Matterhorn before any non-Italian could succeed. Felice Giordano hired Carrel as a guide. He feared the arrival of Whymper, now a rival, and wrote to Quintino Sella:

I have tried to keep everything secret, but that fellow whose life seems to depend on the Matterhorn is here, suspiciously prying into everything. I have taken all the best men away from him; and yet he is so enamored of the mountain that he may go with others... He is here in the hotel, and I try to avoid speaking to him.

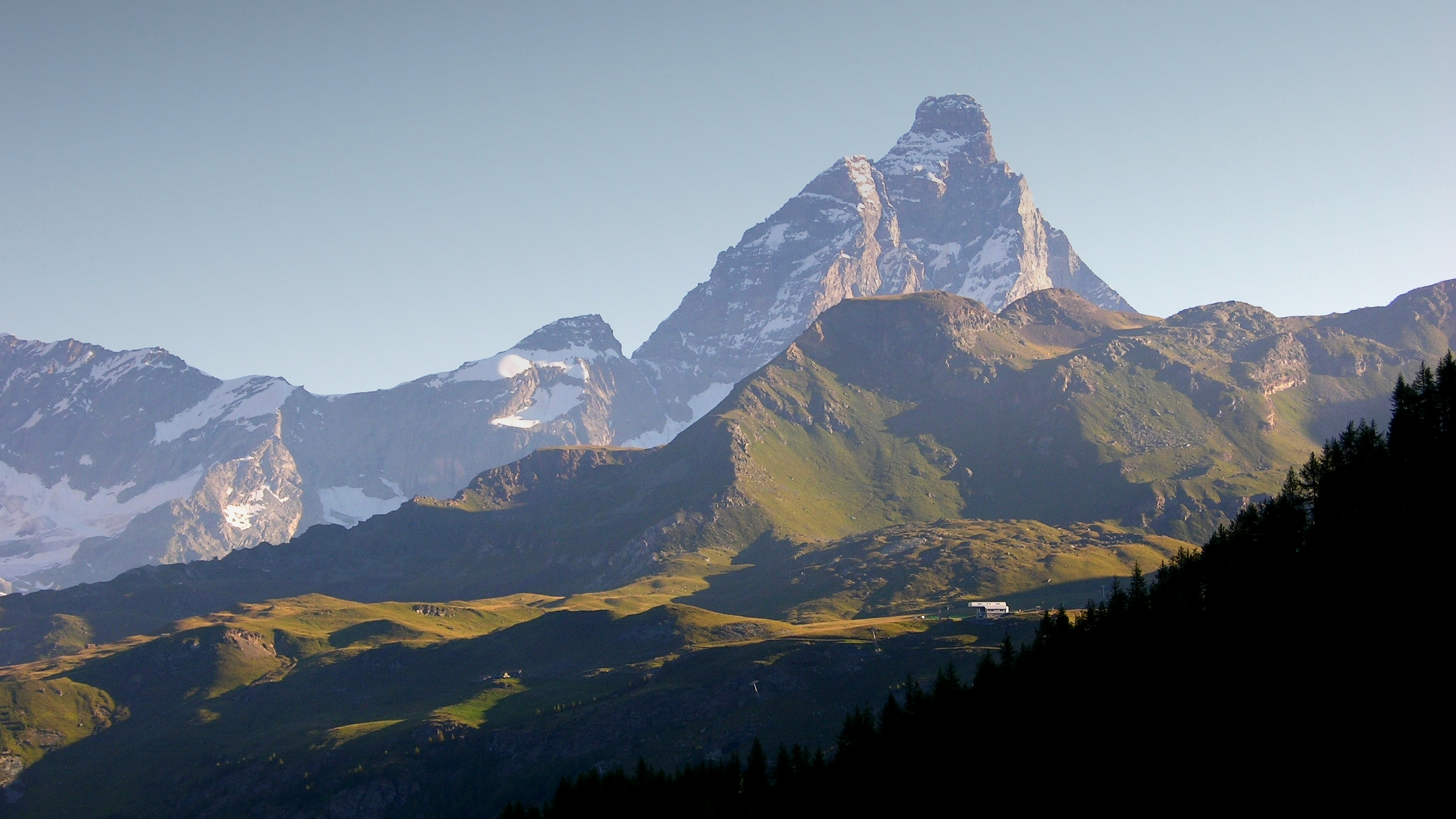
The Matterhorn seen from the Valtournenche Valley

Just as he did two years before, Whymper asked Carrel to be his guide, but Carrel declined; Whymper was also unsuccessful in hiring other local guides from Breuil. When Whymper discovered Giordano and Carrel's plan, he left Breuil and crossed the Theodul Pass to Zermatt to hire local guides. He encountered Lord Francis Douglas, a Scottish mountaineer, who also wanted to climb the Matterhorn. They arrived later in Zermatt at the Monte Rosa Hotel, where they met two other British climbers—the Reverend Charles Hudson and his young and inexperienced companion, Douglas Robert Hadow—who had hired the French guide Michel Croz to try to make the first ascent. These two groups decided to join forces and try the ascent of the Hörnli ridge. They hired two other local guides, Peter Taugwalder and his son of the same name.

=== First ascent ===
Whymper and party left Zermatt early in the morning of 13 July 1865, heading to the foot of the Hörnli ridge, which they reached 6 hours later (approximately where the Hörnli Hut is situated today). Meanwhile, Carrel and six other Italian guides also began their ascent of the Italian ridge.

Despite its appearance, Whymper wrote that the Hörnli ridge was much easier to climb than the Italian ridge:

We were now fairly upon the mountain, and were astonished to find that places which from the Riffel, or even from the Furggen Glacier, looked entirely impracticable, were so easy that we could run about.

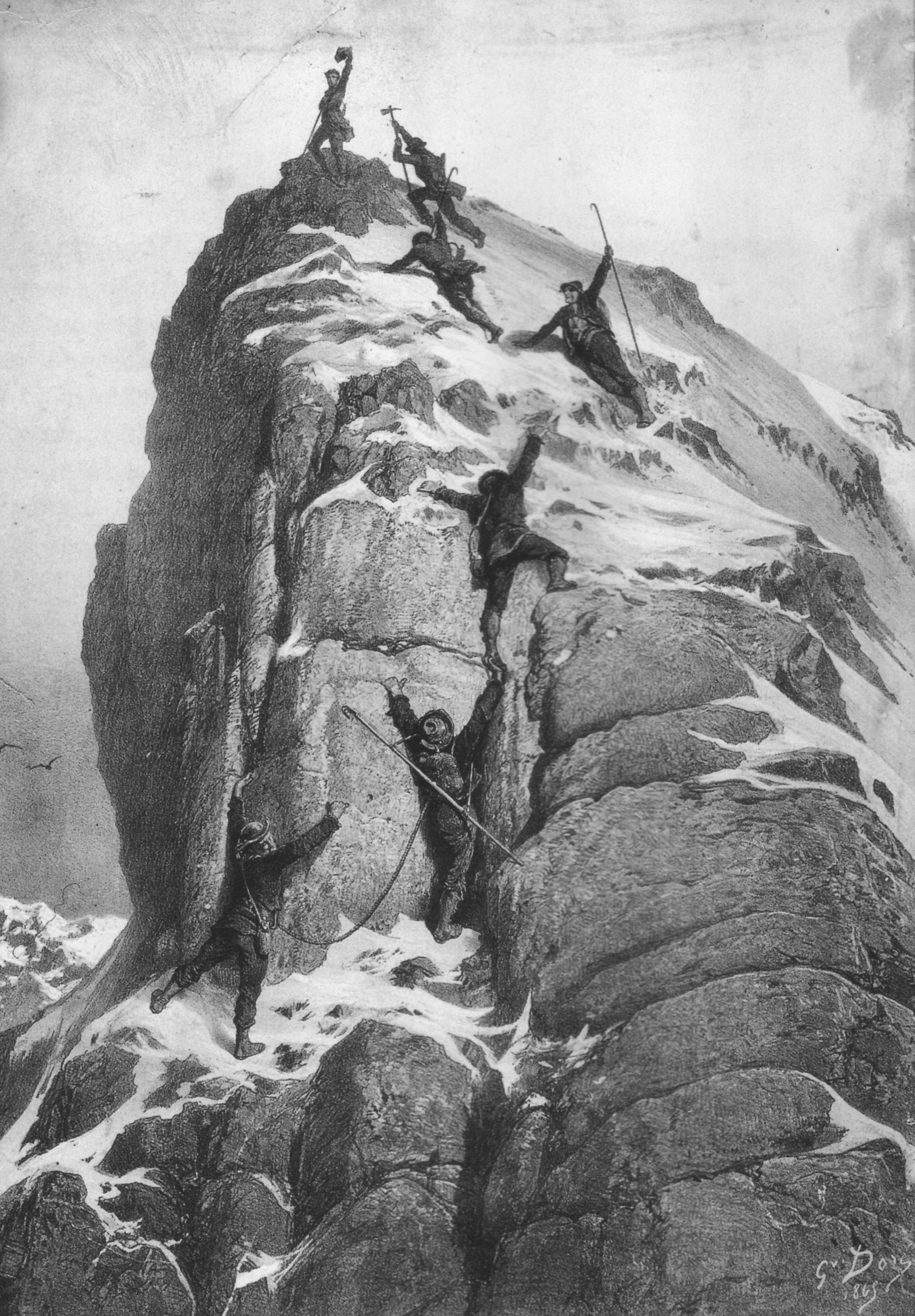
The first ascent of the Matterhorn, by Gustave Doré

After camping for the night, Whymper and party started on the ridge. According to Whymper:

The whole of this great slope was now revealed, rising for 3,000 feet [910 m] like a huge natural staircase. Some parts were more, and others were less, easy; but we were not once brought to a halt by any serious impediment, for when an obstruction was met in front it could always be turned to the right or left. For the greater part of the way there was, indeed, no occasion for the rope, and sometimes Hudson led, sometimes myself. At 6.20 we had attained a height of 12,800 feet [3,900 m] and halted for half an hour; we then continued the ascent without a break until 9.55, when we stopped for fifty minutes, at a height of 14,000 feet [4,300 m].

When the party came close to the summit, they had to leave the ridge for the north face because "[the ridge] was usually more rotten and steep, and always more difficult than the face". At this point of the ascent Whymper wrote that the less experienced Hadow "required continual assistance". Having overcome these difficulties the group finally arrived in the summit area, with Croz and Whymper reaching the top first.

The slope eased off, and Croz and I, dashing away, ran a neck-and-neck race, which ended in a dead heat. At 1.40 p.m. the world was at our feet, and the Matterhorn was conquered. Hurrah! Not a footstep could be seen.

Precisely at this moment, Carrel and party were approximately 400 metres (1,300 ft) below, still dealing with the most difficult parts of the Italian ridge. When seeing his rival on the summit, Carrel and party gave up on their attempt and went back to Breuil.

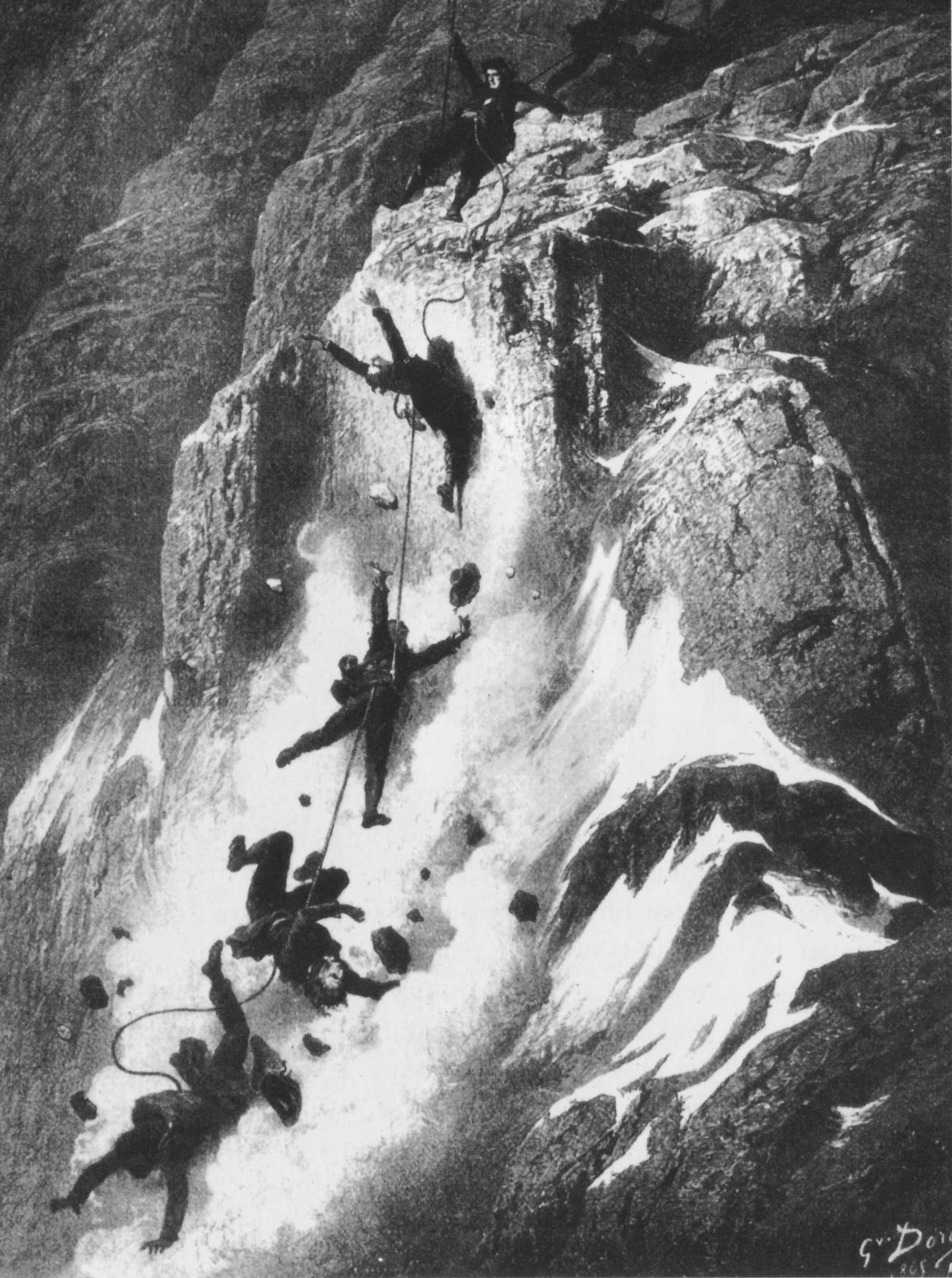
The first descent of the Matterhorn, by Gustave Doré

After building a cairn, Whymper and party stayed an hour on the summit. Then they began their descent of the Hörnli ridge. Croz descended first, then Hadow, Hudson and Douglas, the elder Taugwalder, Whymper, with the younger Taugwalder coming last. They climbed down with great care, only one man moving at a time. Whymper wrote:

As far as I know, at the moment of the accident no one was actually moving. I cannot speak with certainty, neither can the Taugwalders, because the two leading men were partially hidden from our sight by an intervening mass of rock. Poor Croz had laid aside his axe, and in order to give Mr. Hadow greater security was absolutely taking hold of his legs and putting his feet, one by one, into their proper positions. From the movements of their shoulders it is my belief that Croz, having done as I have said, was in the act of turning round to go down a step or two himself; at this moment Mr. Hadow slipped, fell on him, and knocked him over.

The weight of the falling men pulled Hudson and Douglas from their holds and dragged them down the north face. The Taugwalders and Whymper were left alive when the rope linking Douglas to the elder Taugwalder broke. They were stunned by the accident and for a time could not move until the younger Taugwalder descended to enable them to advance. When they were together, Whymper asked to see the broken rope and saw that it had been employed by mistake, as it was the weakest and oldest of the three ropes they had brought. They frantically looked, but in vain, for traces of their fallen companions. They continued their descent, including an hour in the dark, until 9.30 p.m. when a resting place was found. The descent was resumed at daybreak, and the group finally reached Zermatt, where a search of the victims was quickly organised. The bodies of Croz, Hadow and Hudson were found on the Matterhorn Glacier, but the body of Douglas was never found. Although the elder Taugwalder was accused of cutting the rope to save himself and his son, the official inquest found no proof of this.

=== Second ascent ===
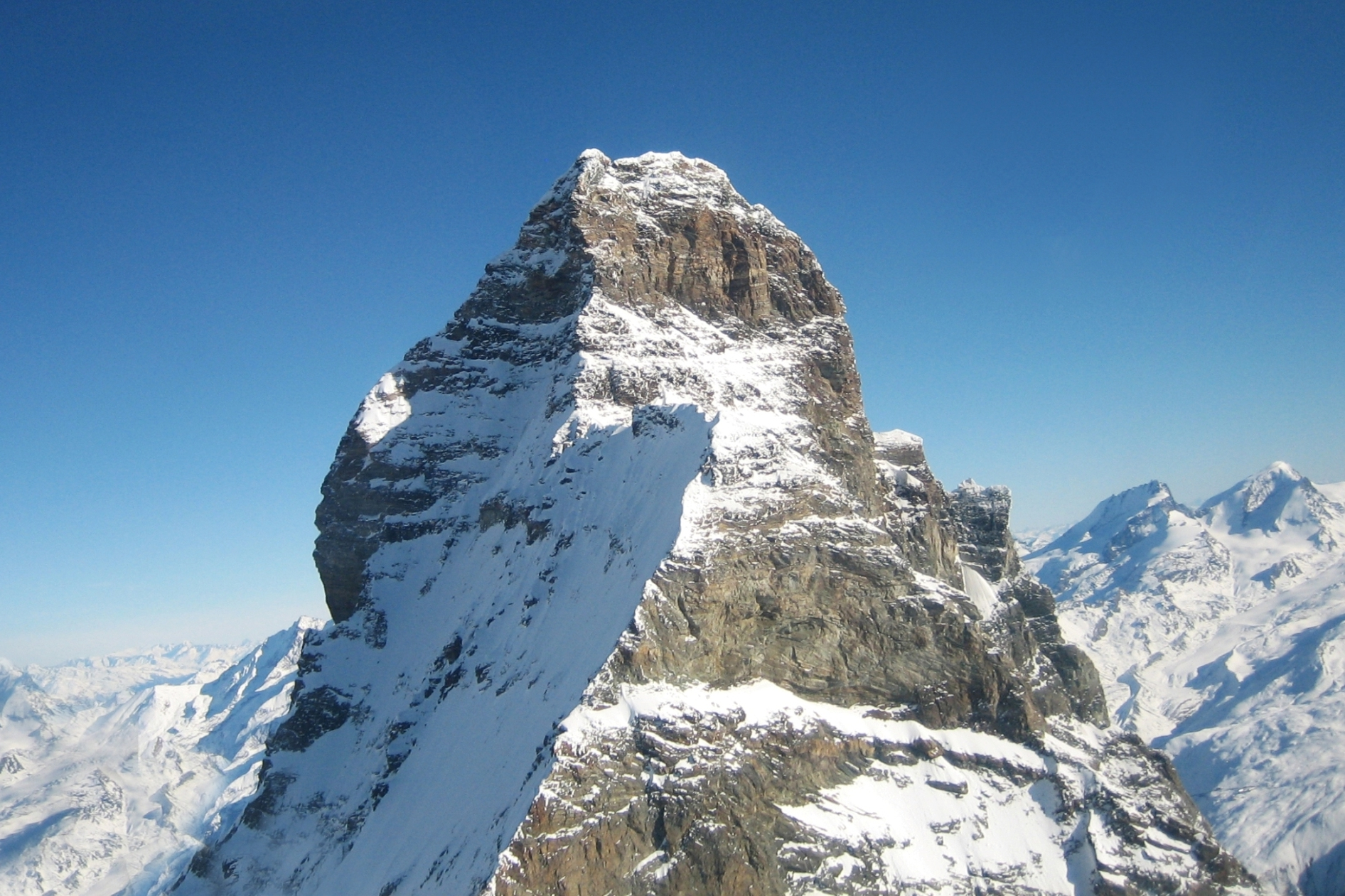
South-west side of the Matterhorn (Tyndall shoulder on the foreground)

On 16 July, two days after the first ascent and the catastrophe, Jean-Antoine Carrel set out to crown Whymper's victory by proving that the Italian side was not unconquerable. He was accompanied by Amé Gorret, a priest who had shared with him the first attempt on the mountain back in 1857. Jean-Baptiste Bich and Jean-Augustin Meynet completed the party. Giordano would have joined them, but Carrel refused absolutely to take him with them; he said he would not have the strength to guide a traveler, and could neither answer for the result nor for anyone's life. After hearing Sunday mass at the chapel of Breuil, the party started. Amé Gorret has described this ascent with enthusiasm: "At last we crossed the Col du Lion and set foot upon the pyramid of the Matterhorn!" On the following day, the 17th, they continued the ascent and reached Tyndall's flagstaff. "We were about to enter unknown country," wrote Gorret, "for no man had gone beyond this point." Here opinions were divided; Gorret suggested ascending by the ridge and scaling the last tower straight up. Carrel was inclined to traverse to the west of the peak, and thence go up on the Zmutt side. Naturally the wish of Carrel prevailed, for he was the leader and had not lost the habit of command, notwithstanding his recent defeat.

They made the passage of the enjambée, and traversed the west face to reach the Zmutt ridge. A false step made by one of the party and a fall of icicles from above warned them to return to the direct line of ascent, and the traverse back to the Lion ridge was one of the greatest difficulty. A falling stone injured Gorret in the arm.

At last they reached the base of the final tower. "We stood," wrote Gorret, "in a place that was almost comfortable. Although it was not more than two yards wide, and the slope was one of 75 percent, we gave it all kinds of pleasant names: the corridor, the gallery, the railroad, &c., &c." They imagined all difficulties were at an end; but a rock couloir, which they had hitherto not observed, lay between them and the final bit of ridge, where progress would be perfectly easy. It would have been unwise for all four to descend into the couloir, because they did not know where to fix the rope that would be needed on their return. Time pressed: it was necessary to reduce the numbers of the party; Gorret sacrificed himself, and Meynet stopped with him. Very soon afterward, Carrel and Bich were finally on the top. Meanwhile, Giordano at Breuil was writing in his diary as follows: "Splendid weather; at 9.30 saw Carrel and his men on the Shoulder, after that saw nothing more of them. Then much mist about the summit. Lifted a bit about 3.30, and we saw our flag on the western summit of the Matterhorn."

=== Other ascents ===
On 22 August 1871, while wearing a white print dress, Lucy Walker became the first woman to reach the summit of the Matterhorn, followed a few weeks later by her rival Meta Brevoort.

In 1876, a party of three English mountaineers made the first ascent without guides. The trio, A. H. Cawood, J. B. Colgrove and the schoolmaster A. Cust, were experienced mountaineers from Lancashire. They chose a day with particularly favourable weather and reached the summit on 23 July.

==== Ridges ====
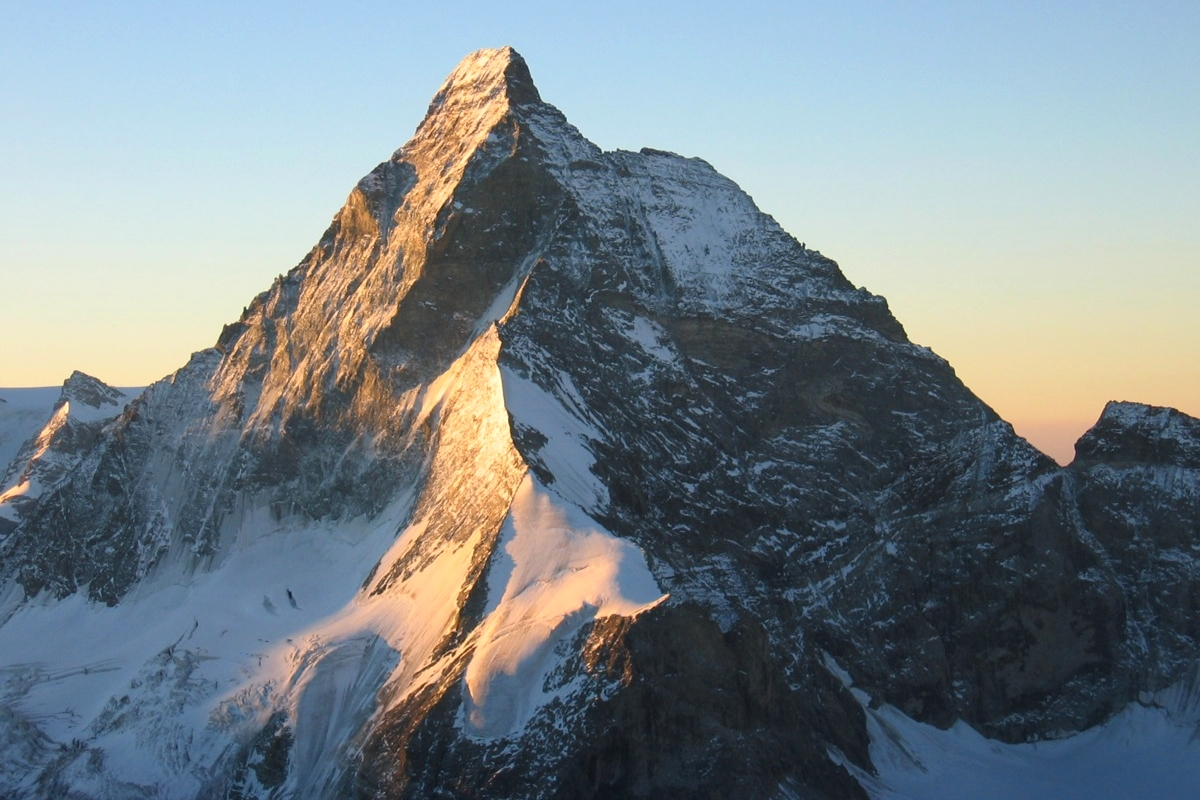
The north and west faces with the snowy Zmutt ridge in the centre

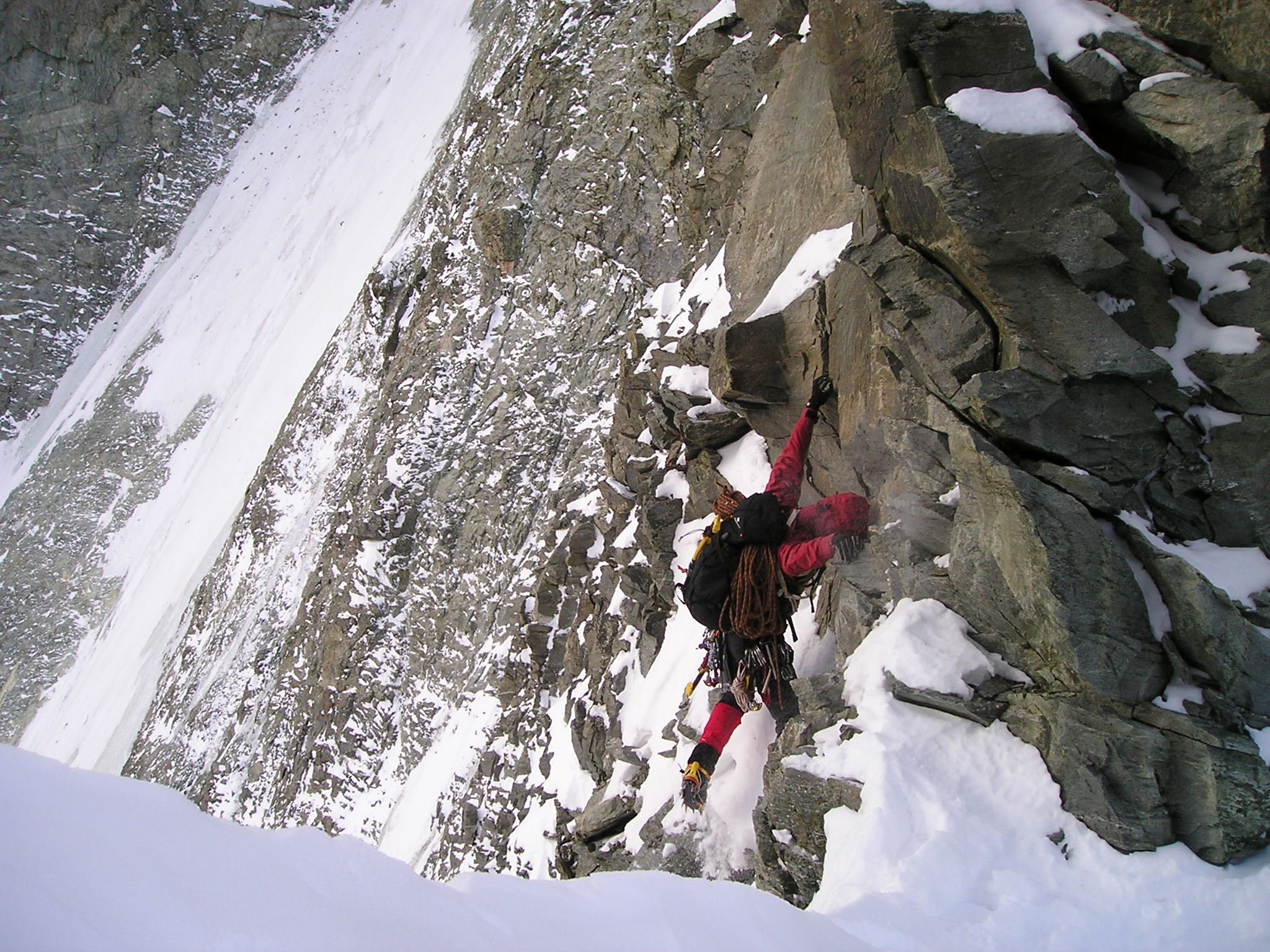
On the Zmutt ridge, with north face in background (c. 3,900 m)

The first direct ascent of the Italian (south-west) ridge as it is climbed today was by Jean-Joseph Maquignaz and Jean-Pierre Maquignaz on 13 September 1867.

Julius Elliott made the second ascent via the Hörnli (north-east) ridge in 1868, and later that year John Tyndall with Jean-Pierre and Jean-Joseph Maquignaz were the first party to traverse the summit by way of the Hörnli and Italian ridges. The first winter ascent of the Hörnli ridge was by Vittorio Sella with guides J. A. Carrel, J. B. Carrel and L. Carrel on 17 March 1882, and its first solo ascent was made by Wilhelm Paulcke in 1898. The first winter solo ascent of the Hörnli ridge was by Giusto Gervasutti in 1936.

The Zmutt (north-west) ridge was first climbed by Albert F. Mummery, Alexander Burgener, J. Petrus and A. Gentinetta on 3 September 1879. Its first solo ascent was made by Hans Pfann in 1906; H. Masson and E. Petrig made, and the first winter ascent on 25 March 1948.

The last of the Matterhorn's four ridges to be ascended was the Furggen (south-east) ridge. M. Piacenza with guides J. J. Carrel and J. Gaspard on 9 September 1911, climbed most of the ridge but bypassed the overhangs near the top to the south. Not until 23 September 1941, during the Second World War, did Alfredo Perino, along with guides Louis Carrel (nicknamed "The Little Carrel") and Giacomo Chiara, climb the complete ridge and the overhangs directly.

In 1966, René Arnold and Joseph Graven made the first solo enchainement of the four Matterhorn ridges in 19.5 hours. Beginning at the 3,300m Bossi Bivouac hut, the pair followed the normal route up the Furggen Ridge and then descended the Hornli Ridge. After crossing the Matterhorn Glacier at the base of the north face, they ascended the Zmutt Ridge and then descended the Italian (Lion) Ridge to the village of Breuil. In 1985, Marco Barmasse repeated their achievement, but this time his route included the first solo ascent of the Furggen overhangs. He completed the enchainement, reaching the Abruzzi Hut after 15 hours.

On 20 August 1992, Italian alpinist Hans Kammerlander and Swiss alpine guide Diego Wellig climbed the Matterhorn four times in just 23 hours and 26 minutes. The route they followed was: Zmutt ridge–summit–Hörnli ridge (descent)–Furggen ridge–summit–Lion ridge (descent)–Lion ridge–summit–Hörnli ridge (descent)–Hörnli ridge–summit–Hörnli Hut (descent). However the Italian route (Lion Ridge), was not climbed from Duca degli Abruzzi Refuge at 2802 m, but from Carrel Hut, at 3830 m, both uphill and downhill.

In 1995, Bruno Brunod climbed Matterhorn from the village Breuil-Cervinia in 2 h 10 min. and from Breuil-Cervinia to Matterhorn and back, in 3:14:44

On 21 August 2013, the Spanish mountain runner Kilian Jornet broke Brunod's record as it took him 1 hour, 56 min to the top from Breuil-Cervinia - a round-trip time of 2 hours 52 minutes to return to his starting point.

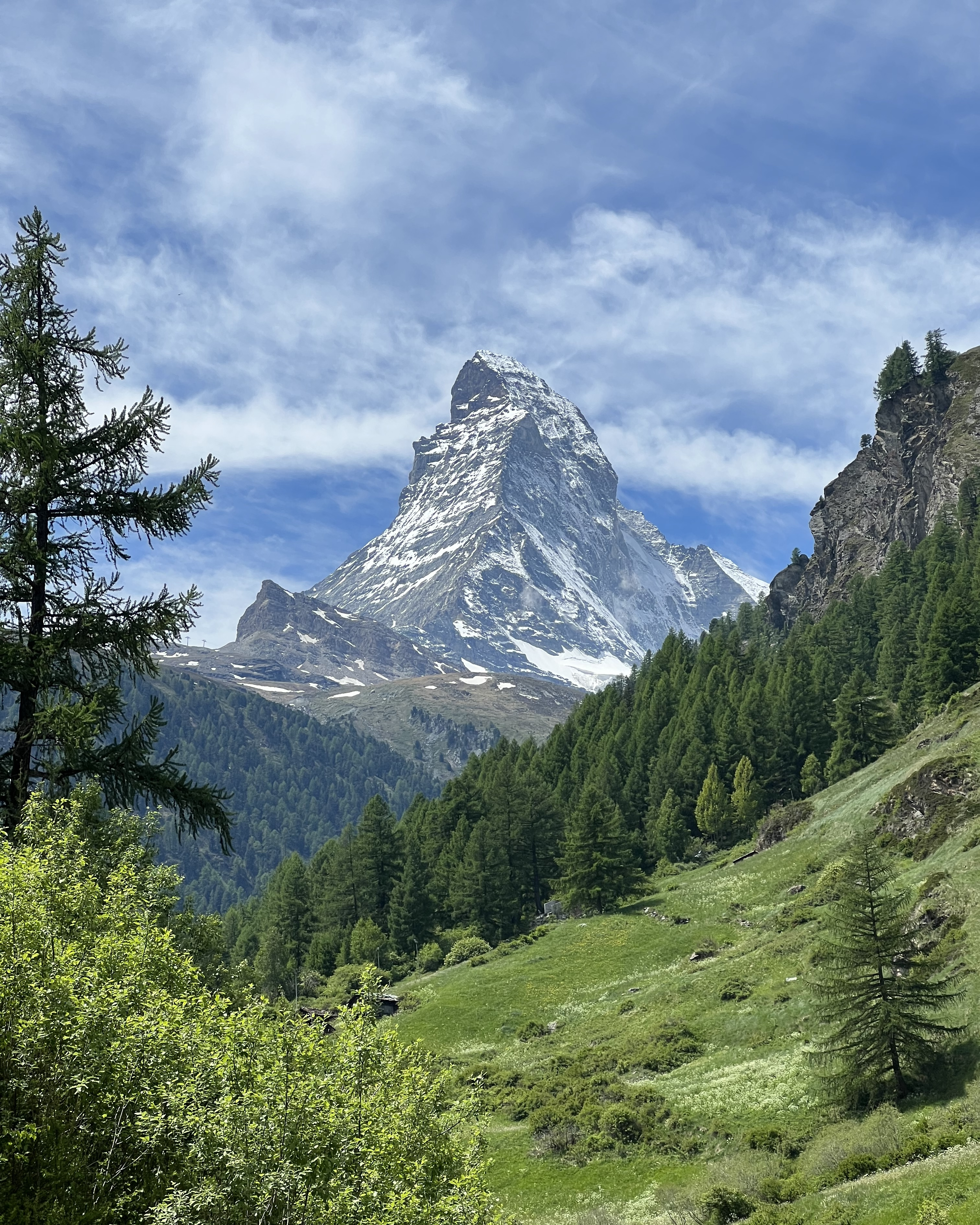
The north and east faces of the Matterhorn

==== Faces ====
William Penhall and guides made the first (partial) ascent of the west face, the Matterhorn's most hidden and unknown, one hour after Mummery and party's first ascent of the Zmutt ridge on 3 September 1879. It was not until 1962 that the west face was completely climbed. The ascent was made on 13 August by Renato Daguin and Giovanni Ottin. In January 1978, seven Italian alpine guides made a successful winter climb of Daguin and Ottin's highly direct, and previously unrepeated, 1962 route. But a storm came during their ascent, bringing two metres of snow to Breuil-Cervinia and Zermatt, and their accomplishment turned bitter when one of the climbers died during the descent.

The north face, before it was climbed in 1931, was one of the last great big wall problems in the Alps. To succeed on the north face, good climbing and ice-climbing technique and route-finding ability were required. Unexpectedly, it was first climbed by the brothers Franz and Toni Schmid on 31 July – 1 August 1931. They reached the summit at the end of the second day, after a night of bivouac. Because they had kept their plans secret, their ascent was a complete surprise. In addition, the two brothers had traveled by bicycle from Munich, and after their successful ascent they cycled back home again. The first winter ascent of the north face was made by Hilti von Allmen and Paul Etter on 3-4 February 1962. Its first solo ascent was made in five hours by Diether Marchart on 22 July 1959. Walter Bonatti climbed the "North Face Direct" solo on 18-22 February 1965. The same year, Yvette Vaucher became the first woman to climb the north face and two years later, in July 1967, Michiko Imai and Yoshiko Wakayama made the first all female ascent of the north face. Bonatti's direct route was not repeated solo until 29 years later, in winter 1994 by Catherine Destivelle.

Ueli Steck set the record time in climbing the north face (Schmid route) of Matterhorn in 2009 with a time of 1 hour 56 minutes.

After Bonatti's climb, the best alpinists were still preoccupied with one last great problem: the "Zmutt Nose", an overhang lying on the right-hand side of the north face. In July 1969 two Italians, Alessandro Gogna and Leo Cerruti, attempted to solve the problem. It took them four days to figure out the unusual overhangs, avoiding its steepest part. In July 1981 the Swiss Michel Piola and Pierre-Alain Steiner surmounted the Zmutt Nose by following a direct route, the Piola-Steiner.

The first ascent of the south face was made by Enzo Benedetti with guides Louis Carrel and Maurice Bich on 15 October 1931, and the first complete ascent of the east face was made by Enzo Benedetti and G. Mazzotti with guides Louis and Lucien Carrel, Maurice Bich and Antoine Gaspard on 18-19 September 1932.

=== Casualties on the Matterhorn ===
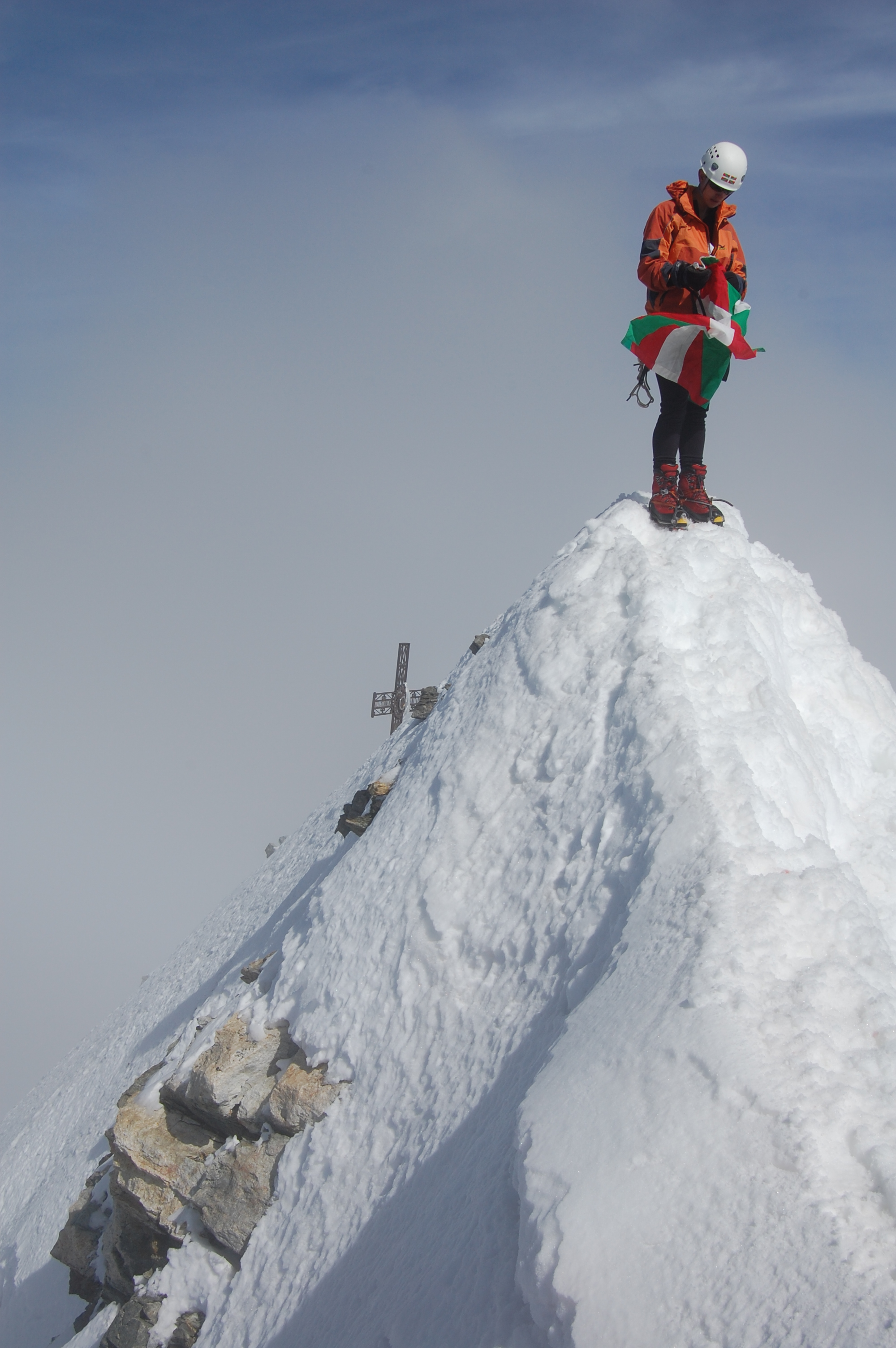
A climber standing on the summit

Several climbers die each year due to a number of factors including the scale of the climb and its inherent dangers, inexperience, falling rocks, and overcrowded routes. The Matterhorn is thus amongst the deadliest mountains in the world. By the late 1980s, it was estimated that over 500 people had died whilst attempting its summit since the 1865 ascent, with an average of about 12 deaths each year.

In the 2000s, there was a trend of fewer people dying each year on the mountain. This has been attributed partly to a greater awareness of the risks, and also due to the fact that a majority of climbers now use local guides. However, in the summer of 2018, at least ten people died on the mountain.

This is a list of people who died on the mountain whose bodies were not recovered until later:

- 1954 French skier Henri le Masne went missing on the Matterhorn. In 2005, remains were found and were identified as le Masne in 2018
- 1970 Two Japanese climbers missing; remains were found after 45 years in 2015
- 1979 British climber missing; remains were found after 34 years in 2014
- 2014 Japanese hiker missing; remains were found in 2018
- 2016 Two British climbers missing; remains were found 2016

=== Legacy: beginning of mountain culture ===
The first ascent of the Matterhorn changed mountain culture. Whymper's book about his first ascent, Scrambles Amongst the Alps, published in 1871, was a worldwide bestseller. Tourists began to visit Switzerland in the summer to see the Alps and often hired locals as guides. With the beginning of alpine skiing in the early 20th century, tourists began traveling to Switzerland in winter also. Mountaineering, in part, helped transform Switzerland's mountain regions from poor rural areas to tourist destinations. This combination of mountain climbing, skiing, and tourism was used in the western United States, creating Sun Valley, Vail, Jackson Hole, and other mountain towns around the world.

== Climbing routes ==
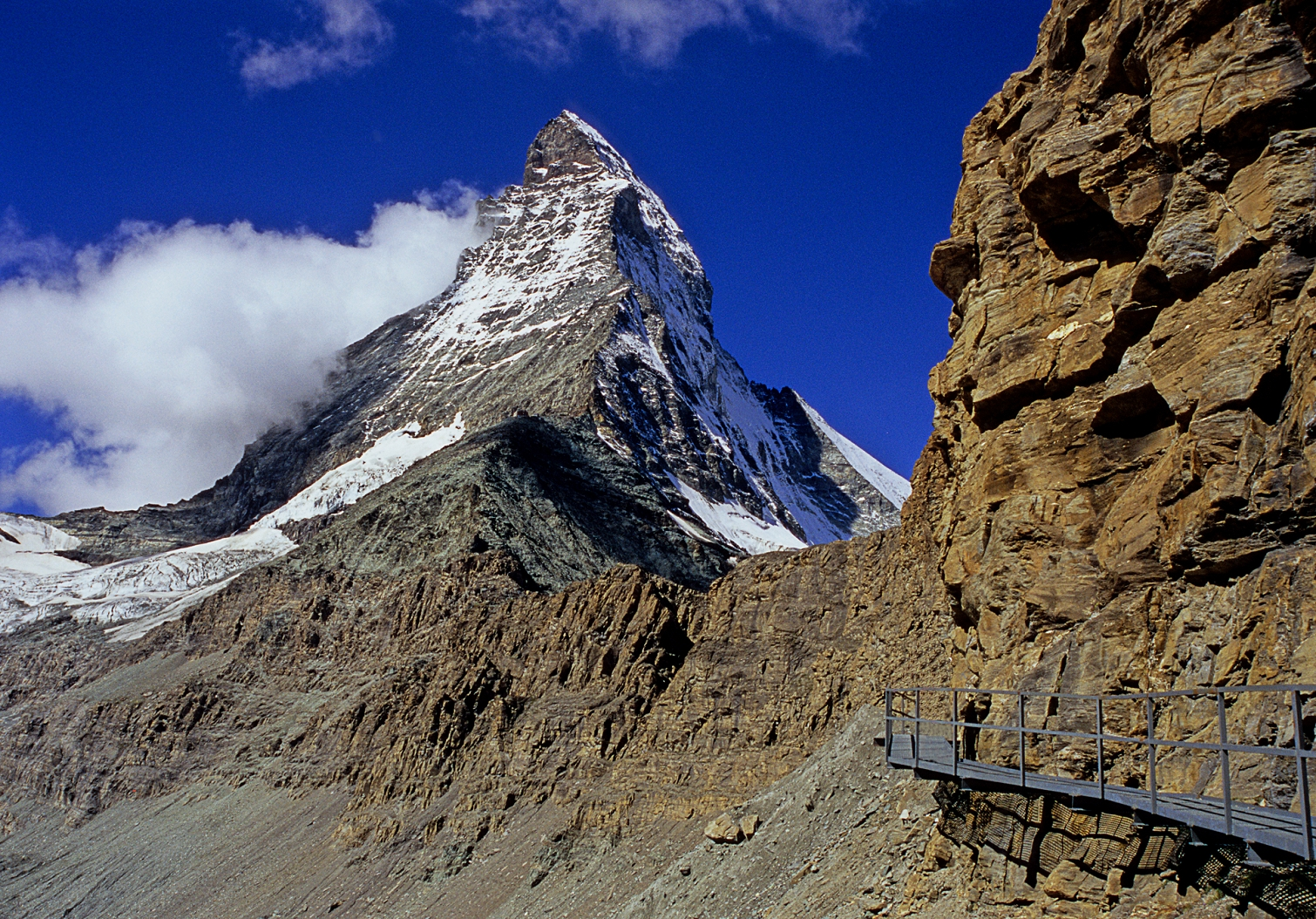
Trail to the Hörnli Hut

Today, all ridges and faces of the Matterhorn have been ascended in all seasons, and mountain guides take a large number of people up the northeast Hörnli route each summer. In total, up to 150 climbers attempt the Matterhorn each day during summer. By modern standards, the climb is fairly difficult (AD Difficulty rating), but not hard for skilled mountaineers according to French climbing grades. There are fixed ropes on parts of the route to help.

The usual pattern of ascent is to take the Schwarzsee cable car up from Zermatt, hike up to the Hörnli Hut elev. 3,260 m (10,700 ft), a large stone building at the base of the main ridge, and spend the night. The next day, climbers rise at 3:30 am so as to reach the summit and descend before the regular afternoon clouds and storms come in. The Solvay Hut located on the ridge at 4,003 m (13,133 ft) can be used only in a case of emergency.

Other popular routes on the mountain include the Italian (Lion) ridge (AD+ Difficulty rating) and the Zmutt ridge (D Difficulty rating). The four faces, as well as the Furggen ridge, constitute the most challenging routes to the summit. The north face is amongst the six most difficult faces of the Alps, as well as 'The Trilogy', the three hardest of the six, along with the north faces of the Eiger and the Grandes Jorasses (TD+ Difficulty rating).

Overcrowding on the several routes has become an issue, and guides and local authorities have struggled with how to regulate the numbers. In 2015, the Hörnli hut became the first mountain shelter in Europe to limit beds.

	Routes	Start	Time of ascent	Difficulty
Ridges	Hörnli	Hörnli Hut	6 hours	AD/III-
Ridges	Zmutt	Hörnli Hut (or Schönbiel Hut)	7 hours (10 hours)	D/IV
Ridges	Lion	Carrel Hut	5 hours	AD+/III
Ridges	Furggen	Bivacco Bossi	7 hours	TD/V+
Faces	North	Hörnli Hut	14 hours	TD/V
Faces	West	Schönbiel Hut	12 hours	TD/V+
Faces	South	Rifugio Duca degli Abruzzi	15 hours	TD+/V+
Faces	East	Hörnli Hut	14 hours	TD

== History ==
Aegidius Tschudi, one of the earliest Alpine topographers and historians, was the first to mention the region around the Matterhorn in his work, De Prisca ac Vera Alpina Raethi, published in Basel in 1538. He approached the Matterhorn as a student when in his Alpine travels he reached the summit of the Theodul Pass, but he does not seem to have paid any particular attention to the mountain itself.

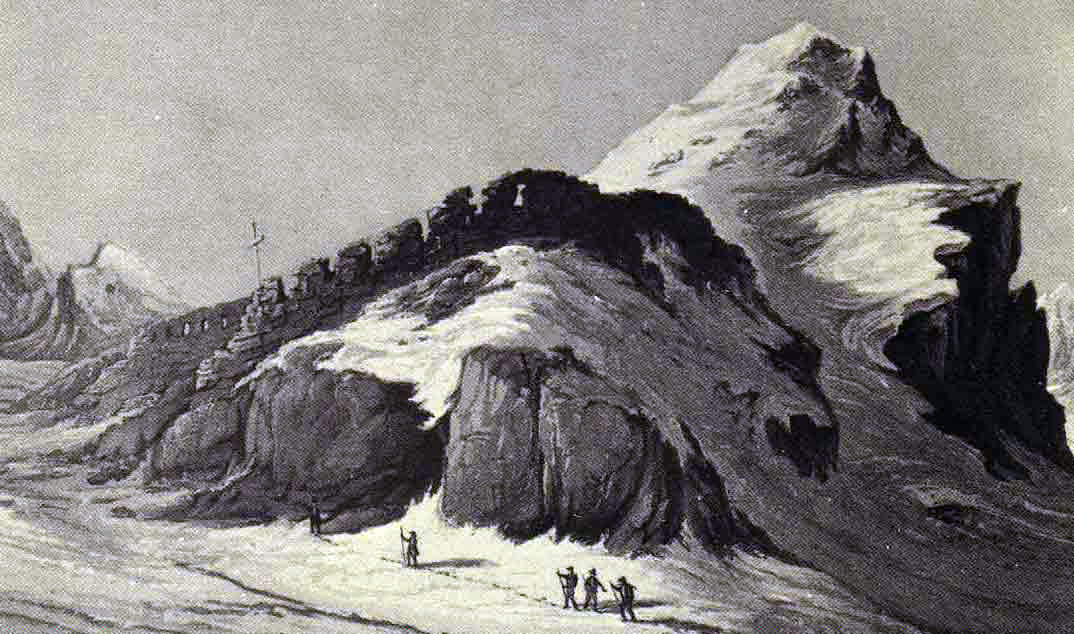
Theodulpass, c. 1800

The Matterhorn remained unstudied for more than two centuries, until a geologist from Geneva, Horace Benedict de Saussure, travelled to the mountain, which filled him with admiration. However, de Saussure was not moved to climb the mountain, and had no hope of measuring its altitude by taking a barometer to its summit. "Its precipitous sides," he wrote, "which give no hold to the very snows, are such as to afford no means of access." Yet his scientific interest was kindled by "the proud peak which rises to so vast an altitude, like a triangular obelisk, that seems to be carved by a chisel." His mind intuitively grasped the causes which gave the peak its present precipitous form: the Matterhorn was not like a perfected crystal; the centuries had laboured to destroy a great part of an ancient and much larger mountain. On his first journey de Saussure had come from Ayas to the Col des Cimes Blanches, from where the Matterhorn first comes into view; descending to Breuil, he ascended to the Theodul Pass. On his second journey, in 1792, he came to the Valtournanche, studying and describing it; he ascended to the Theodul Pass, where he spent three days, analysing the structure of the Matterhorn, whose height he was the first to measure, and collecting stones, plants and insects. He made careful observations, from the sparse lichen that clung to the rocks to the tiny but vigorous glacier fly that fluttered over the snows and whose existence at such heights was mysterious. At night he took refuge under the tent erected near the ruins of an old fort at the top of the pass. During these days he climbed the Klein Matterhorn (3,883 metres), which he named the Cime Brune du Breithorn.

The first inquirers began to come to the Matterhorn. There is a record of a party of Englishmen who in the summer of 1800 crossed the Great St. Bernard Pass, a few months after the passage of Bonaparte; they came to Aosta and thence to Valtournenche, slept at the chalets of Breuil, and traversed the Theodul Pass, which they called Monte Rosa. The Matterhorn was to them an object of the most intense and continuous admiration.

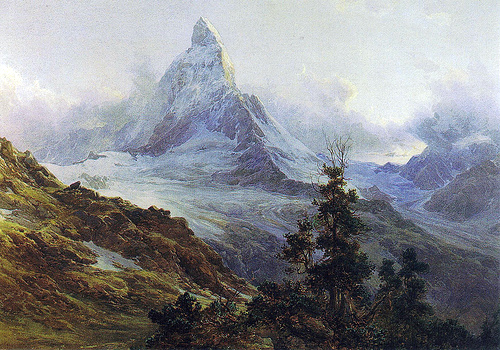
The Matterhorn by Edward Theodore Compton, 1879

The Matterhorn is mentioned in a guidebook to Switzerland by Johann Gottfried Ebel, which was published in Zürich towards the end of the eighteenth century, and translated into English in 1818. The mountain appeared in it under the three names of Silvius, Matterhorn, and Mont Cervin, and was briefly described as one of the most splendid and wonderful obelisks in the Alps. On Zermatt there was a note: "A place which may, perhaps, interest the tourist is the valley of Praborgne (Zermatt); it is bounded by huge glaciers which come right down into the valley; the village of Praborgne is fairly high, and stands at a great height above the glaciers; its climate is almost as warm as that of Italy, and plants belonging to hot countries are to be found there at considerable altitudes, above the ice."

William Brockedon, who came to the region in 1825, considered the crossing of the Theodul Pass from Breuil to Zermatt a difficult undertaking. He gave, however, expression to his enthusiasm on the summit. When he arrived exhausted on the top of the pass, he gazed "on the beautiful pyramid of the Cervin, more wonderful than aught else in sight, rising from its bed of ice to a height of 5,000 feet, a spectacle of indescribable grandeur." In this "immense natural amphitheatre, enclosed from time immemorial by snow-clad mountains and glaciers ever white, in the presence of these grand walls the mind is overwhelmed, not indeed that it is unable to contemplate the scene, but it staggers under the immensity of those objects which it contemplates."

Those who made their way up through the Valtournanche to the foot of the mountain were few in number. W. A. B. Coolidge, a diligent collector of old and new stories of the Alps, mentions that during those years, besides Brockedon, only Hirzel-Escher of Zürich, who crossed the Theodul Pass in 1822, starting from Breuil, accompanied by a local guide. The greater number came from the Valais up the Visp valley to Zermatt. In 1813, a Frenchman, Henri Maynard, climbed to the Theodul Pass and made the first ascent of the Breithorn; he was accompanied by numerous guides, among them J. M. Couttet of Chamonix, the same man who had gone with de Saussure to the top of the Klein Matterhorn in 1792. The writings of these pioneers make much mention of the Matterhorn; the bare and inert rock is gradually quickened into life by men's enthusiasm. "Stronger minds," remarked Edward Whymper, "felt the influence of the wonderful form, and men who ordinarily spoke or wrote like rational beings, when they came under its power seemed to quit their senses, and ranted and rhapsodised, losing for a time all common forms of speech."

Among the poets of the Matterhorn during these years (1834 to 1840) were Elie de Beaumont, a famous French geologist; Pierre Jean Édouard Desor, a naturalist of Neuchâtel, who went up there with a party of friends, two of whom were Louis Agassiz and Bernhard Studer. Christian Moritz Engelhardt, who was so filled with admiration for Zermatt and its neighbourhood that he returned there at least ten times (from 1835 to 1855), described these places in two valuable volumes, drew panoramas and maps, and collected the most minute notes on the mineralogy and botany of the region. Zermatt was at that time a quiet little village, and travellers found hospitality at the parish priest's, or at the village doctor's.

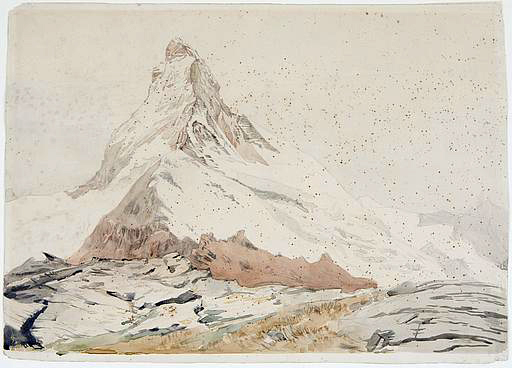
The Matterhorn by John Ruskin, 1849

In 1841 James David Forbes, professor of natural philosophy at the University of Edinburgh, came to see the Matterhorn. A philosopher and geologist, and an observant traveller, he continued the work of De Saussure in his journeys and his writings. He was full of admiration for the Matterhorn, calling it the most wonderful peak in the Alps, unsealed and unscalable. These words, pronounced by a man noted among all his contemporaries for his thorough knowledge of mountains, show what men's feelings then were towards the Matterhorn, and how at a time when the idea of Alpine exploration was gaining ground in their minds, the Matterhorn stood by itself as a mountain apart, of whose conquest it was vain even to dream. And such it remained till long after this; as such it was described by John Ball twenty years later in his celebrated guide-book. Forbes ascended the Theodul Pass in 1842, climbed the Breithorn, and came down to Breuil; as he descended from the savage scenery of the Matterhorn, the Italian landscapes of the Valtournanche seemed to him like paradise. Meanwhile, Gottlieb Samuel Studer, the geographer, together with Melchior Ulrich, was describing and mapping the topographical features of the Zermatt peaks.

Rodolphe Töpffer, who first accompanied and guided youth to the Alps for purposes of education and amusement, began his journeys in 1832. Still, it is only in 1840 that he mentions the Matterhorn. Two years later, Töpffer and his pupils came to Zermatt. He has described this journey of his in a chapter entitled Voyage autour du Mont Blanc jusqu'à Zermatt, here he sings a hymn of praise to the Matterhorn, comparing its form with a "huge crystal of a hundred facets, flashing varied hues, that softly reflects the light, unshaded, from the uttermost depths of the heavens". Töpffer's book was illustrated by Alexandre Calame, his master and friend, with drawings of the Matterhorn, executed in the romantic style of the period. It is an artificial mountain, a picture corresponding rather with the exaggerated effect it produces on the astonished mind of the artist, than with the real form of the mountain.

About this time there came a man who studied the Matterhorn in its structure and form, and who sketched it and described it in all its parts with the curiosity of the artist and the insight of the scientist. This was John Ruskin, a new and original type of philosopher and geologist, painter and poet, whom England was enabled to create during that period of radical intellectual reforms, which led the way for the highest development of her civilisation. Ruskin was the Matterhorn's poet par excellence. He went to Zermatt in 1844, and it is to be noticed as a curious fact that the first time he saw the Matterhorn it did not please him. The mountain on its lofty pedestal in the very heart of the Alps was, perhaps, too far removed from the ideal he had formed of the mountains; but he returned, studied and dreamt for long at its feet, and at length he pronounced it "the most noble cliff in Europe." Ruskin was no mountaineer, nor a great friend to mountaineering; he drew sketches of the mountains merely as an illustration of his teaching of the beauty of natural forms, which was the object of his whole life. In his work on Modern Painters, he makes continual use of the mountains as an example of beauty and an incentive to morality. The publication of Ruskin's work certainly produced a great impression at the time on educated people in England, and a widespread desire to see the mountains.

It is a fragment of some size; a group of broken walls, one of them overhanging; crowned with a cornice, nodding some hundred and fifty feet over its massive flank, three thousand above its glacier base, and fourteen thousand above the sea, — a wall truly of some majesty, at once the most precipitous and the strongest mass in the whole chain of the Alps, the Mont Cervin.

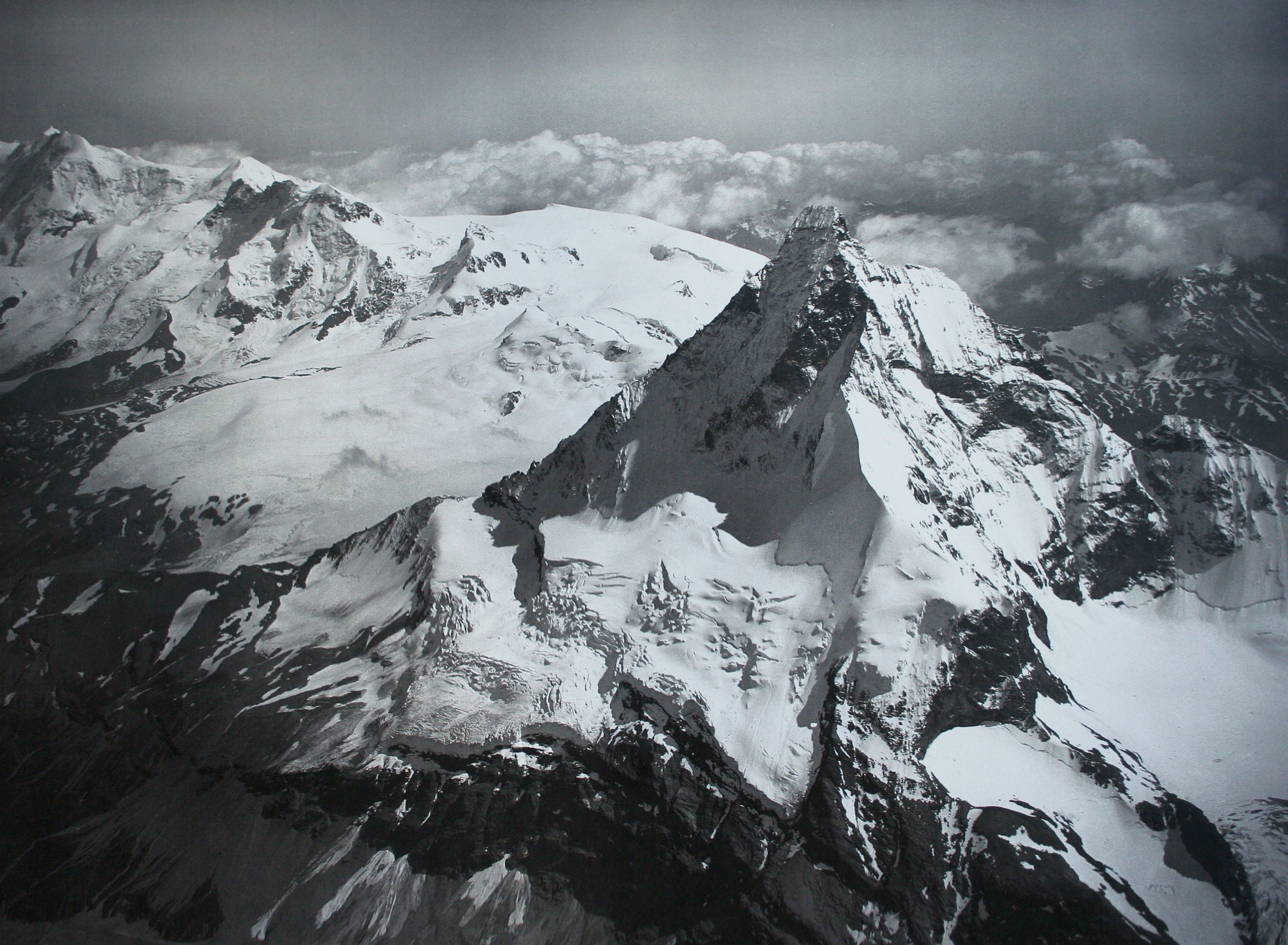
Aerial photography by Eduard Spelterini in 1910

Other men of high attainments followed, but in the years 1850 scientists and artists were about to be succeeded by real climbers and the passes and peaks around Zermatt were explored little by little. In the preface to the first volume of the Alpine Journal, which appeared in 1863, the editor Hereford Brooke George wrote that: "While even if all other objects of interest in Switzerland should be exhausted, the Matterhorn remains (who shall say for how long?) unconquered and apparently invincible." Whymper successfully reached the summit in 1865, but four men perished on the descent. The English papers discussed it with bitter words of blame; a German newspaper published an article in which Whymper was accused of cutting the rope between Douglas and Taugwalder, at the critical moment, to save his own life.

In 1890 the Federal Government was asked simultaneously by the same contractor for a concession for the Zermatt-Gornergrat railway, and for a Zermatt-Matterhorn one. The Gornergrat railway was constructed in 1896-1898 and has been working since August 1898, but there has been no more talk of the other. The project essentially consisted of a line which went up to the Hörnli, and continued thence in a rectilinear tunnel about two kilometres long, built under the ridge, and issuing near the summit on the Zmutt side. Sixty years later, in 1950, Italian engineer Count Dino Lora Totino planned a cable car on the Italian side from Breuil-Cervinia to the summit. But the Alpine Museum of Zermatt sent a protest letter with 90,000 signatures to the Italian government. The latter declared the Matterhorn a natural wonder worthy of protection and refused the concession to the engineer.

2015 marked the 150th anniversary of the first ascent. Events and festivities were held throughout the year. A completely renewed Hörnli Hut opened the same year in July.

In 2020, during the COVID-19 pandemic, light artist Gerry Hofstetter started projecting country flags and messages of endurance onto the mountain peak as part of a nightly series designed to show support and spread hope for everyone suffering and those fighting the pandemic.

== Other mountains ==
Hundreds of other mountains have been compared to the Matterhorn, either for their resemblance to it or because of their apparent inaccessibility.

=== Mountains named after the Matterhorn ===
- Little Matterhorn (1,480 m), Australia
- Matterhorn (1,600 m), in Antarctica
- Matterhorn (3,305 m), in Nevada
- Matterhorn Peak (3,744 m), in California
- Matterhorn Peak (4,144 m), in Colorado
- Matterhorn Peak (2,636 m), in British Columbia
- Neny Matterhorn (1,125 m), Antarctica

== In culture ==
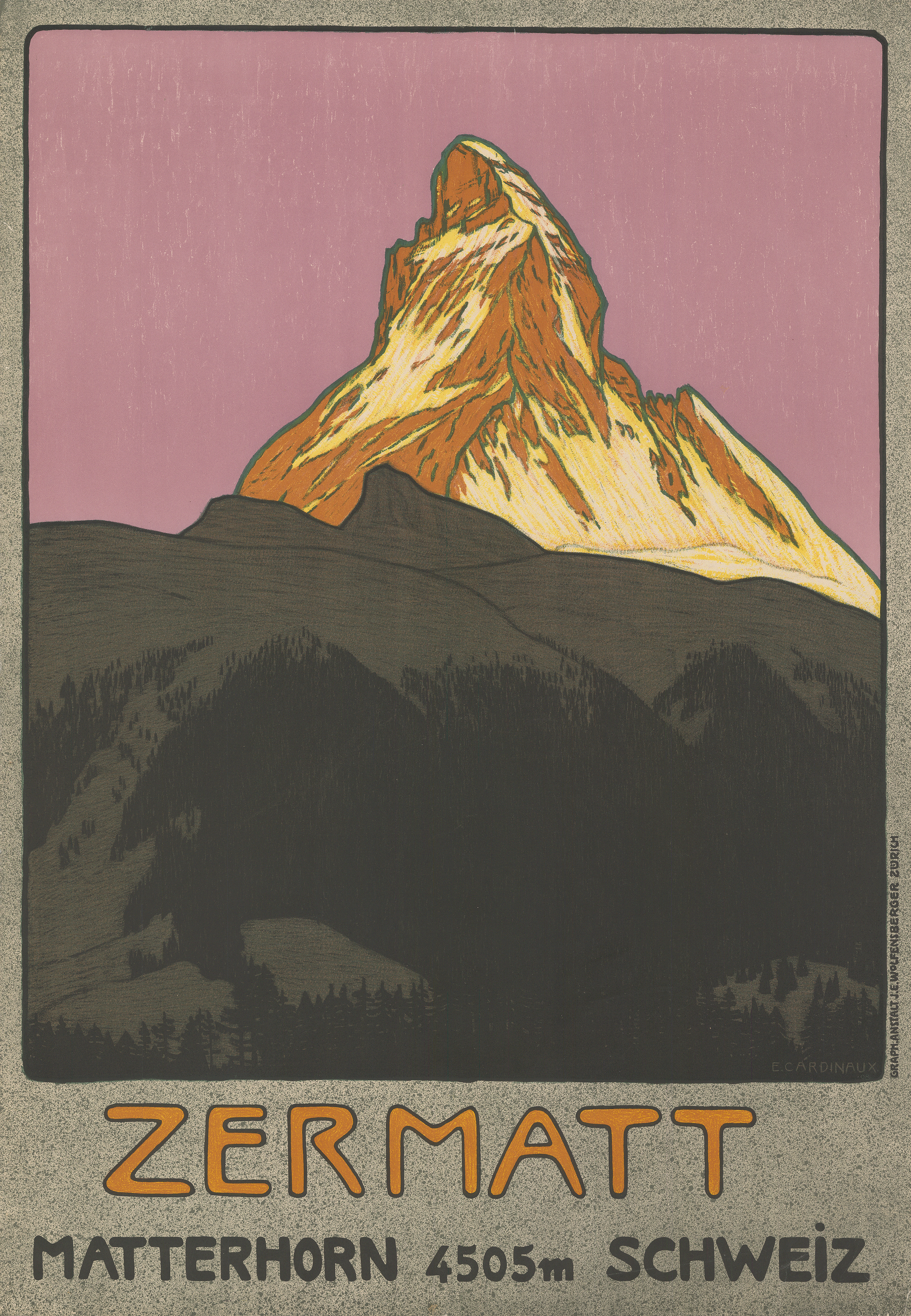
1908 Swiss poster
(Emil Cardinaux)

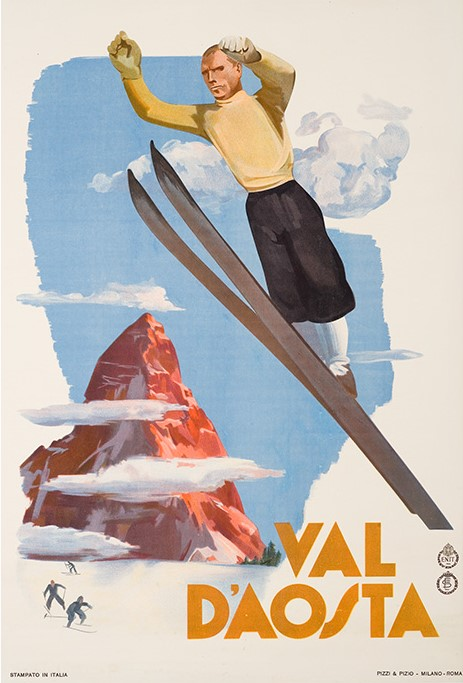
1935 Italian poster
(anonymous)

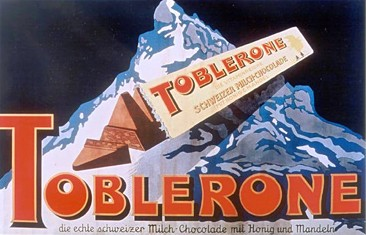
Poster created by Cardinaux for Toblerone in the 1920s

During the 20th century, the Matterhorn and the story of the first ascent in particular inspired various artists and film producers such as Luis Trenker and Walt Disney. Large-scale replicas can be found at Disneyland and Window of the World. In 2021, a Matterhorn-related attraction opened in the Swiss Museum of Transport, enabling visitors to climb it virtually from the Solvay Hut to the summit.

Designed in 1908 by Emil Cardinaux, a leading poster artist of the time, the Matterhorn poster for the Zermatt tourist office is often considered the first modern poster. It has been described as a striking example of a marriage of tourism, patriotism, and popular art. It served as decoration in many Swiss military hospices during the war, in addition to being found in countless middle-class living rooms. Another affiche depicting the Matterhorn was created by Cardinaux for the chocolate brand Toblerone in the 1920s. The image of the Matterhorn first appeared on Toblerone chocolate bars in 1960. Since then, the Matterhorn has become a reference that still inspires graphic artists today and has been used extensively for all sort of publicity and advertising.

=== Paintings ===
- The Matterhorn (1849), John Ruskin
- The Matterhorn (1867), Albert Bierstadt
- Matterhorn (1879), Edward Theodore Compton
- Le Cervin (1892), Félix Vallotton

=== Coins ===
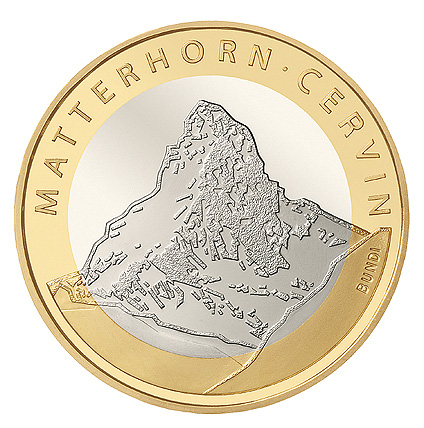
Swiss Commemorative coin 2004 CHF 10

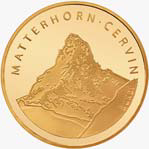
Swiss Commemorative coin 2004 CHF 50

=== Music ===
The Matterhorn is depicted in the background of the cover for Depeche Mode's third album Construction Time Again (1983), which reached the Top Ten of the album charts in the UK and Germany.

The song Matterhorn was recorded in 1966 by The Country Gentlemen, a popular Washington, D.C. bluegrass band.

=== Filmography ===
- Struggle for the Matterhorn (1928)
- The Mountain Calls (1938)
- The Challenge (1938)
- High Conquest (1947)
- Climbing the Matterhorn (1947)
- Third Man on the Mountain (1959)
- Im Banne des Berges (2015)
- Soarin' Around the World/Soaring Over the Horizon (2016)
- The Horn (2016) - Documentary series following the mountain rescue teams in the Swiss Alps.

== Bibliography ==
- Guido Rey The Matterhorn (translated J. E. C. Eaton), London, 1907 (Note: Rey's Il Monte Cervino was first published in Italian and appeared in English in 1907, in a translation by J. E. C. Eaton; a revised edition, with two further chapters by R. L. G. Irving, was published in Oxford by Basil Blackwell, 1946, and reprinted in 1949)
- Beat P. Truffer: Matterhorn-DVD, 1:18 Film, 1'001 Photos, 17 E-Books, 1 Audiobook, Aroleit-Verlag, Zermatt 2015, ISBN 978-3-905097-24-5, www.matterhornworld.ch
- Charles Gos, Le Cervin (Attinger, 1948)
- Yvan Hostettler, Matterhorn: Alpine Top Model (Olizane Edition, Geneva, 2006). The use of the Matterhorn in advertisement, publicity, movies, painting, and arts
- R. L. G. Irving, Ten Great Mountains (London, J. M. Dent & Sons, 1940) (Note: The climbing history up to 1939 of the Matterhorn, Snowdon, Ben Nevis, Ushba, Mount Logan, Everest, Nanga Parbat, Kanchenjunga, Mount Cook and Mont Blanc)
- Beat P. Truffler, The History of the Matterhorn: First Ascents, Projects and Adventures, 7th ed., (Aroleit-Verlag, Zermatt, 2015). ISBN 978-3-905097-22-1. Translation of Die Geschichte des Matterhorns from the German by Mirjam Steinmann
- Edward Whymper, Scrambles Amongst the Alps (1871)
- The book, Banner in the Sky, by James Ramsey Ullman is based on Edward Whymper's ascent.

== Notes and references ==
=== References ===
- La conquête du Cervin, Pierre Staelen
