= Monte Rosa Hotel =

Hotel, located in Zermatt

Coordinates: 46°01′13″N 7°44′46″E

Monte Rosa
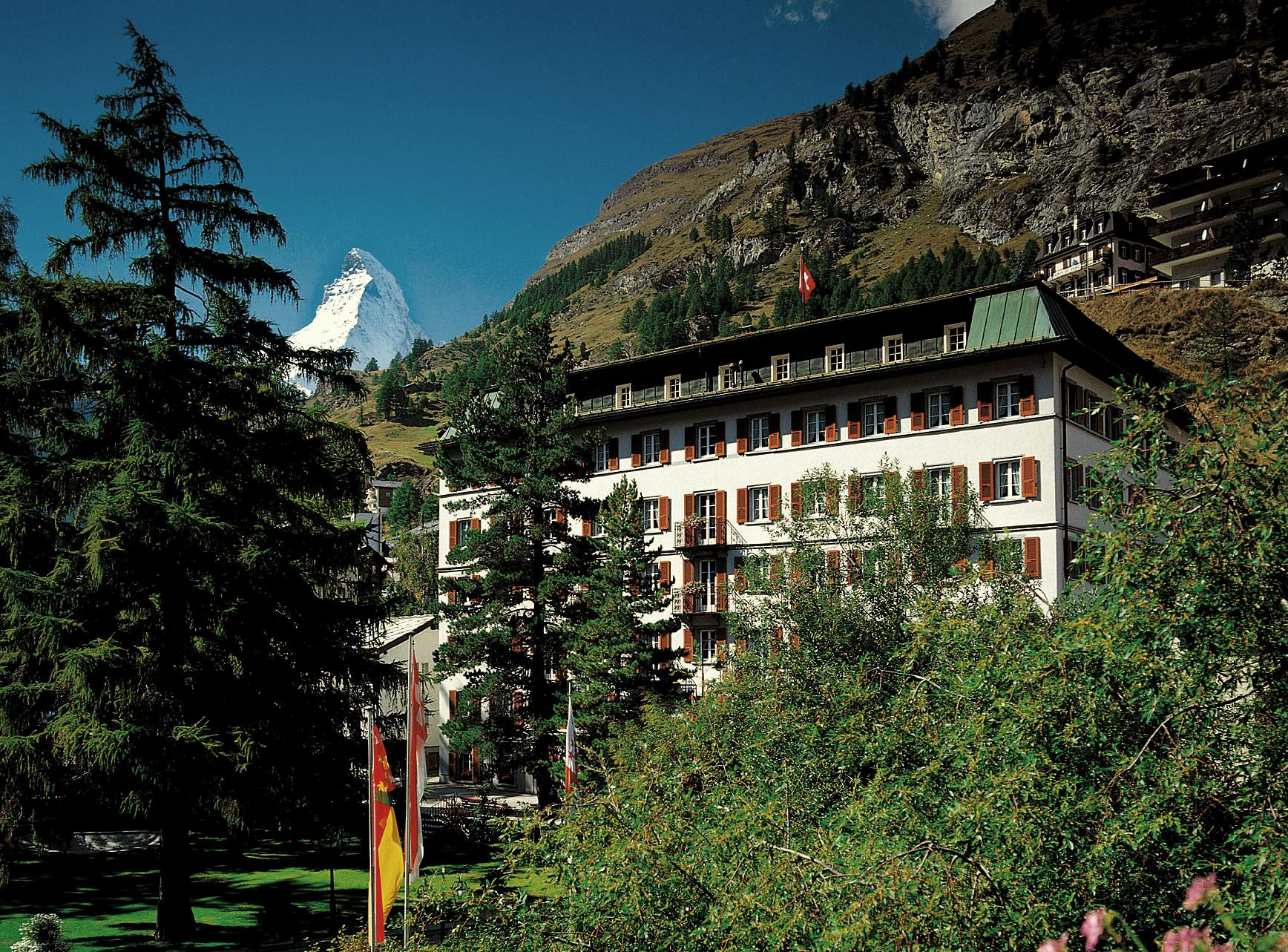
- The Monte Rosa with the Matterhorn on the left
- Interactive map of the Monte Rosa area

General information
- Location: Bahnhofstrasse 80, Zermatt
- Opening: 24 July 1855

The Monte Rosa is a hotel, located in the main street of Zermatt. It was frequented by the members of the Alpine Club, including Edward Whymper who made the first ascent of the Matterhorn in 1865. The hotel is named after the highest mountain near Zermatt, Monte Rosa.

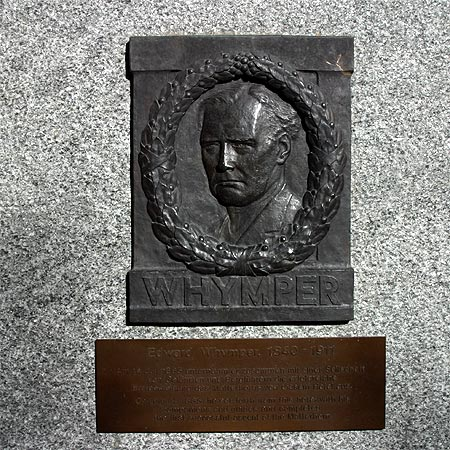
Whymper memorial

== See also ==
- List of hotels in Switzerland
- Tourism in Switzerland
