= Hörnli Hut =

Mountain hut on the Matterhorn

Coordinates: 45°58′55.5″N 7°40′37.5″E

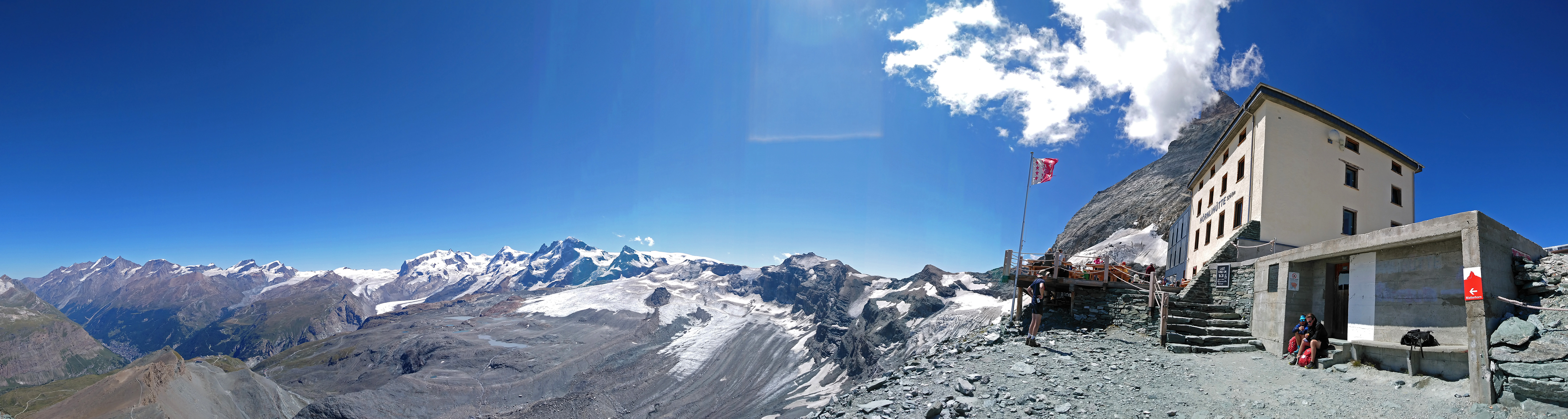
Hörnli Hut in 2019

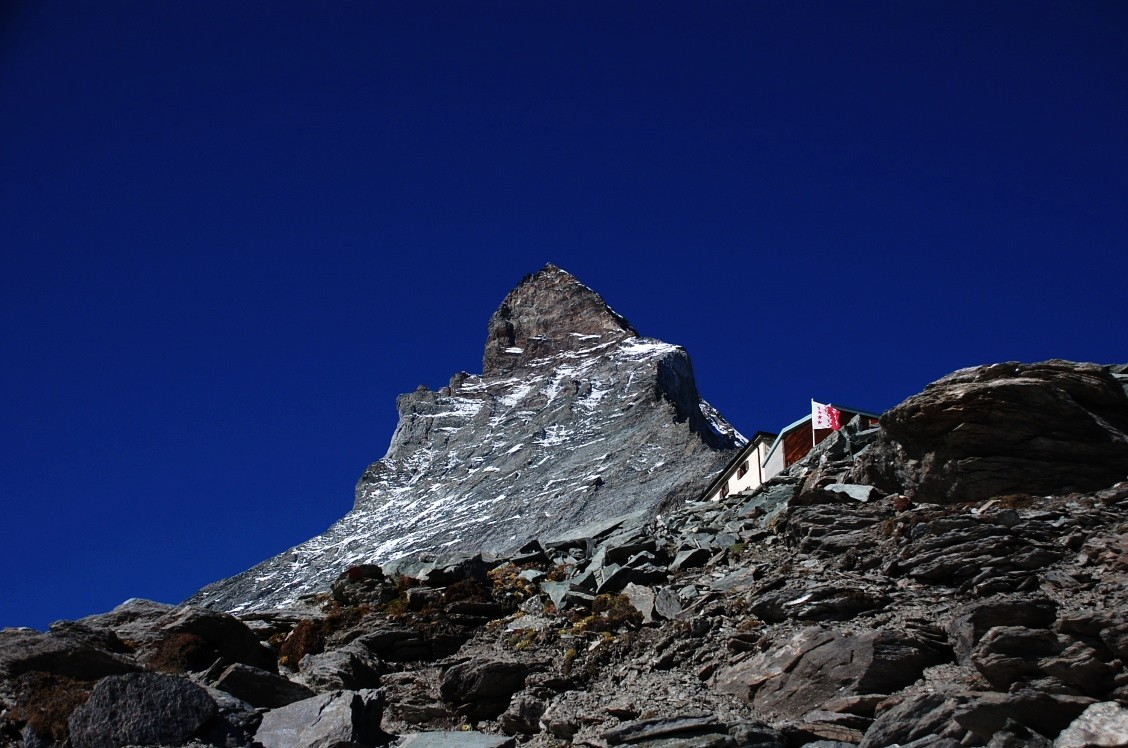
Below the Hörnli ridge of the Matterhorn

The Hörnli Hut (German: Hörnlihütte) is a mountain hut located at the foot of the north-eastern ridge (Hörnli Ridge) of the Matterhorn. It is situated at 3,260 metres (10,700 ft) above sea level, a few kilometres south-west of the town of Zermatt in the canton of Valais in Switzerland. It is also known as Berghaus Matterhorn.

The first Hörnli hut was built by the Swiss Alpine Club in 1880 and had 17 beds. It has since been expanded and rebuilt several times. In 1911, the municipality of Zermatt built a hut directly next to the Hotel Belvédère (also Berghaus Matterhorn). Both were merged in 1987 and managed by the municipality and offered since its last renovation in 1982 a number of 170 beds. From 2013 to 2015, the Belvédère was renovated and a new extension built. The original Hörnli hut was demolished.

The new hut was inaugurated on 14 July 2015, the 150th anniversary of the first ascent of the mountain. It offers 130 beds (in a total of 34 8-,6-,4- and 2-person rooms) and an enlarged kitchen, modernized sanitation with showers and electricity from solar energy. Camping around the hut is prohibited and there is a winter room with limited provisions. Overcrowding on the several routes have become an issue and guides and local authorities have struggled with how to regulate the numbers. The new Hörnli hut became the first mountain shelter in Europe to purposely limit the number of beds.

The hut is accessible to hikers. From the cable car station of Schwarzsee (or from Zermatt) a marked trail leads to the ridge and then to the hut. It is used to climb the Matterhorn on the normal route. The Solvay Hut lies also higher on the same ridge, but can only be used in case of emergency.

== See also ==
- List of buildings and structures above 3000 m in Switzerland
