= Little Matterhorn (Heard Island) =

Little Matterhorn (53°4′S 73°30′E) is a rocky peak, 1,480 metres (4,860 ft) high, formed by a small volcanic cone 1.1 nautical miles (2 km) north-northwest of Fremantle Peak, on the north flank of Big Ben, the dominating mountain on Heard Island. It was surveyed and named in 1948 by the Australian National Antarctic Research Expedition.
