= Wandfluehorn =

Mountain of the Swiss Pennine Alps

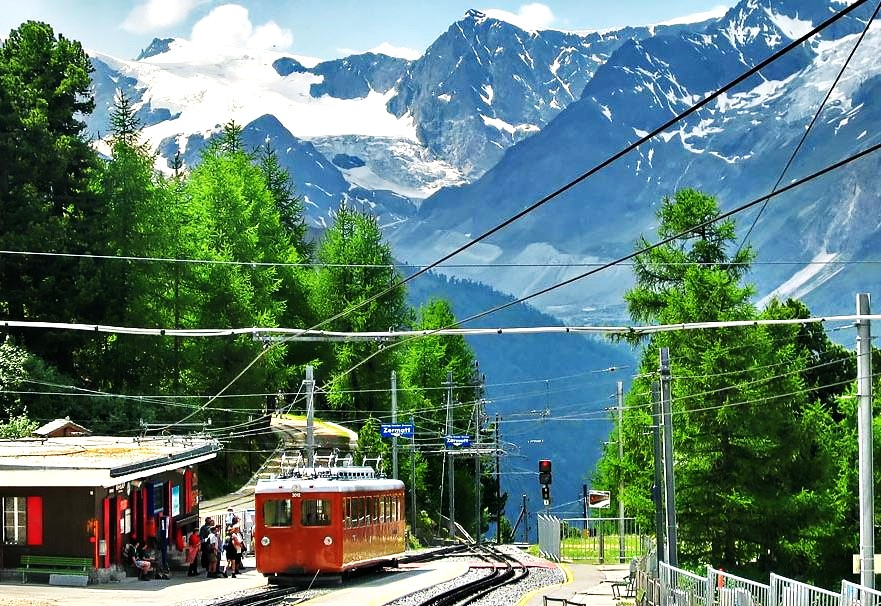
- The Wandfluehorn (centre) from Riffelalp

Highest point
- Elevation: 3,589 m (11,775 ft)
- Prominence: 115 m (377 ft)
- Parent peak: Dent Blanche
- Coordinates: 46°0′7.3″N 7°36′6.9″E

Geography
- Location within Switzerland
- Location: Valais, Switzerland
- Parent range: Pennine Alps

The Wandfluehorn is a mountain of the Swiss Pennine Alps, located between Les Haudères and Zermatt in the canton of Valais. It lies south of the Dent Blanche.

While the western side is flat and covered by the Ferpècle Glacier, the eastern side consists of a 600 metres cliff named Wandflue.
