= Second ascent of the Matterhorn =

Made in July 1865, three days after the first

Coordinates: 45°58′36″N 7°39′26″E

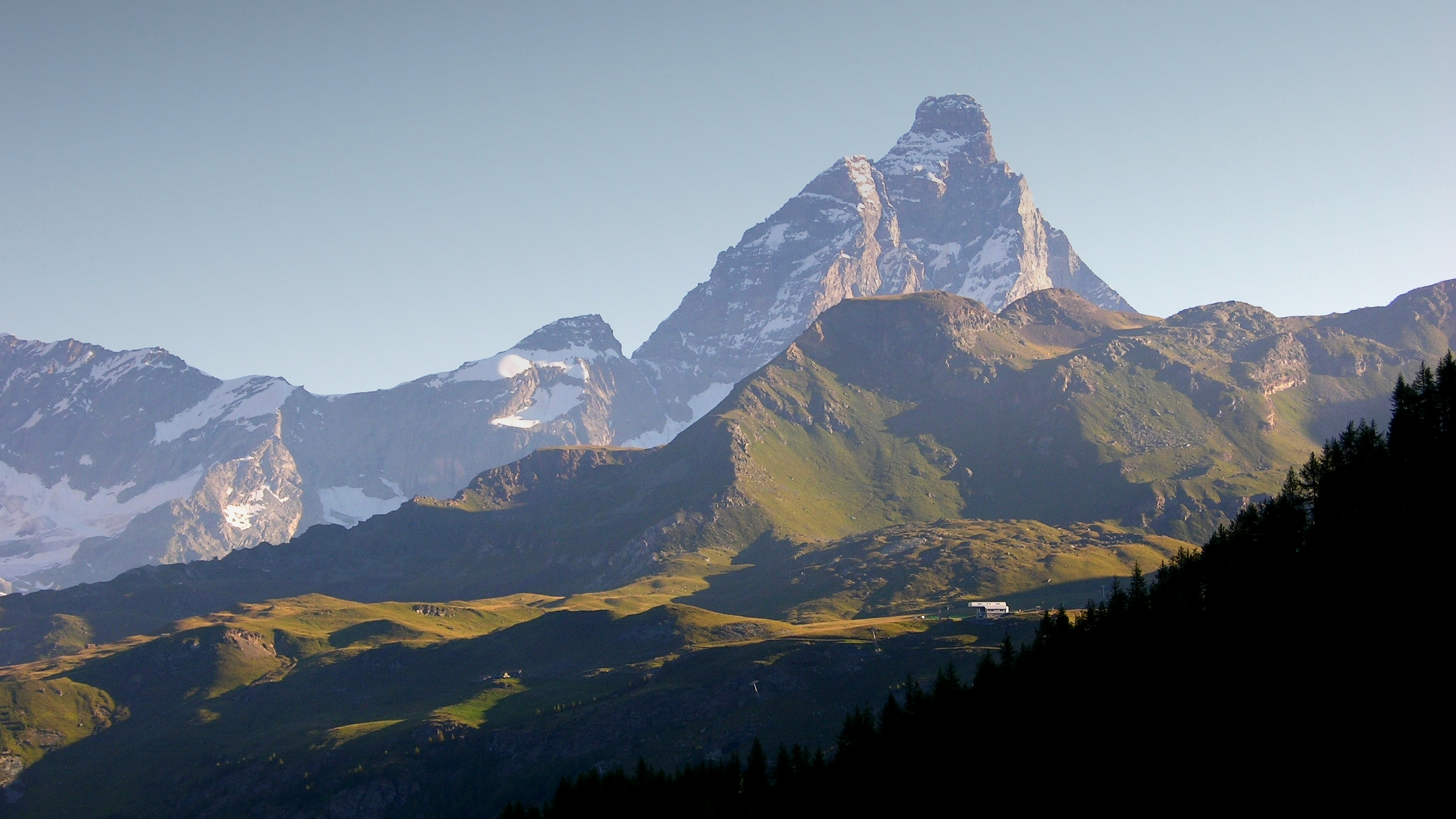
The Matterhorn seen from the Valtournenche

The second ascent of the Matterhorn was accomplished in July 1865, only three days after the successful (with 4 fatalities) expedition led by Edward Whymper on the Zermatt side. The second was effected on the Italian side by Jean-Antoine Carrel and Jean-Baptiste Bich with the abbé Amé Gorret and Jean-Augustin Meynet who followed them near to the summit. The party started from Breuil on 16 July and reached the top the following day.

The successful ascent followed a long series of attempts that took place on the southwest ridge of the Matterhorn. The Italian side was considered easier than the Swiss side but despite appearances, the southern routes were harder, and parties repeatedly found themselves having to turn back.

Since 2015, the route on the Italian side has gained popularity, as the Hörnlihütte on the Swiss side was rebuilt with a limited number of beds and charges a higher lodging fee. This popularity also brought a rising number of climbing accidents on the Italian route, while the number on the Swiss side dropped.

== Background and preparations ==
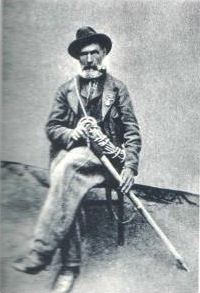
Jean-Antoine Carrel

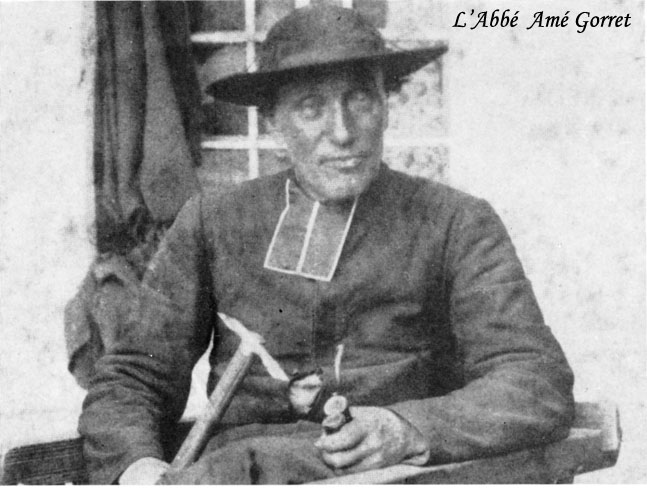
Amé Gorret

The Valtournanche natives who started to facilitate the way up the southwest ridge of the Matterhorn for Felice Giordano and Quintino Sella, pitched their tent upon Whymper's third platform, at the foot of the Great Tower (3,960 m), and enjoyed several days of bad weather under its shelter. On the first fine day (13 July) they began their work, and about midday on the 14th got on to the Shoulder, and arrived at the base of the final peak (the point where Tyndall and his guide Bennen stopped on 28 July 1862). The counsels of the party were then divided. Two —Jean-Antoine Carrel and Joseph Maquignaz wished to go on; the others were reluctant. A discussion took place, and the result was they all commenced to descend, and whilst upon the "cravate" (4,122 m) they heard Whymper and others crying from the summit. Upon the 15th they went down to Breuil and reported their ill-success to Giordano. "An evil day!" wrote the latter in his diary, dating the entry the 15th. "Early in the morning Carrel, more dead than alive, came to tell me he had been forestalled. He had reckoned on climbing to the top today, and expected to be able to force a passage not by the highest tower, which he considers impossible, but on the Zmutt side, where the snow is. I have decided that he and others shall at least try and ascend and plant our flag."

So Giordano attempted to recruit men from Breuil to make another attempt. He was in a most unfavourable position: he was at any rate uncertain whether the last bit was passable. The men who had been with Carrel steadily refused to try again, as if they were overcome with terror of the mountain. It was in vain that Giordano attempted to rouse them out of their depression, and explained to them that till that day he had expended money and labour for himself, with the object of being the first to reach the top; but that now, such good fortune being denied to him, he was only acting for the honour and in the interests of the guides of Valtournanche. The guides' replies were most discouraging but the abbé Amé Gorret came forward and offered to accompany Carrel. The latter accepted the volunteer, and thus two of those who, eight years before, had taken the first steps towards climbing the Matterhorn, were together in the last attempt. Carrel and Gorret would have set out by themselves had not Jean-Baptiste Bich and Jean-Augustin Meynet (two men in the employ of Favre the innkeeper) come forward at the last moment. Giordano would have joined them, but Carrel refused absolutely to take him with them; he said he would not have the strength to guide a traveller, and could neither answer for the result nor for any one's life. Giordano, for his own credit, desired Carrel to state as much in writing. At the end of the day he makes the following note in his pocket-book: "Walked a mile, suffering the pangs of disappointment. A very bad night with fever. Only one barometrical observation."

== The ascent ==
On Sunday, the 16th, after hearing mass at the chapel of Breuil, the party started. Giordano was left sad and lonely at Breuil. " I have once more made the great sacrifice of waiting at the foot of the peak instead of climbing it," he wrote in another letter to Sella, "and I assure you that this has been most painful to me." He saw them through his telescope pitching their tent at the customary bivouac at the foot of the Tower at 2 p.m. Amé Gorret has described this ascent with enthusiasm: "At last we crossed the Col du Lion and set foot upon the pyramid of the Matterhorn!" The four men, having left Breuil at 6.30 a.m., arrived at the third tent platform at 1 a.m. and there passed the night. The passage of the cleft that separates the Pic Tyndall from the main peak, named the enjambée, and that stopped Tyndall and Bennen, was accomplished. We were about to enter unknown country, "wrote Gorret," for no man had gone beyond this point."

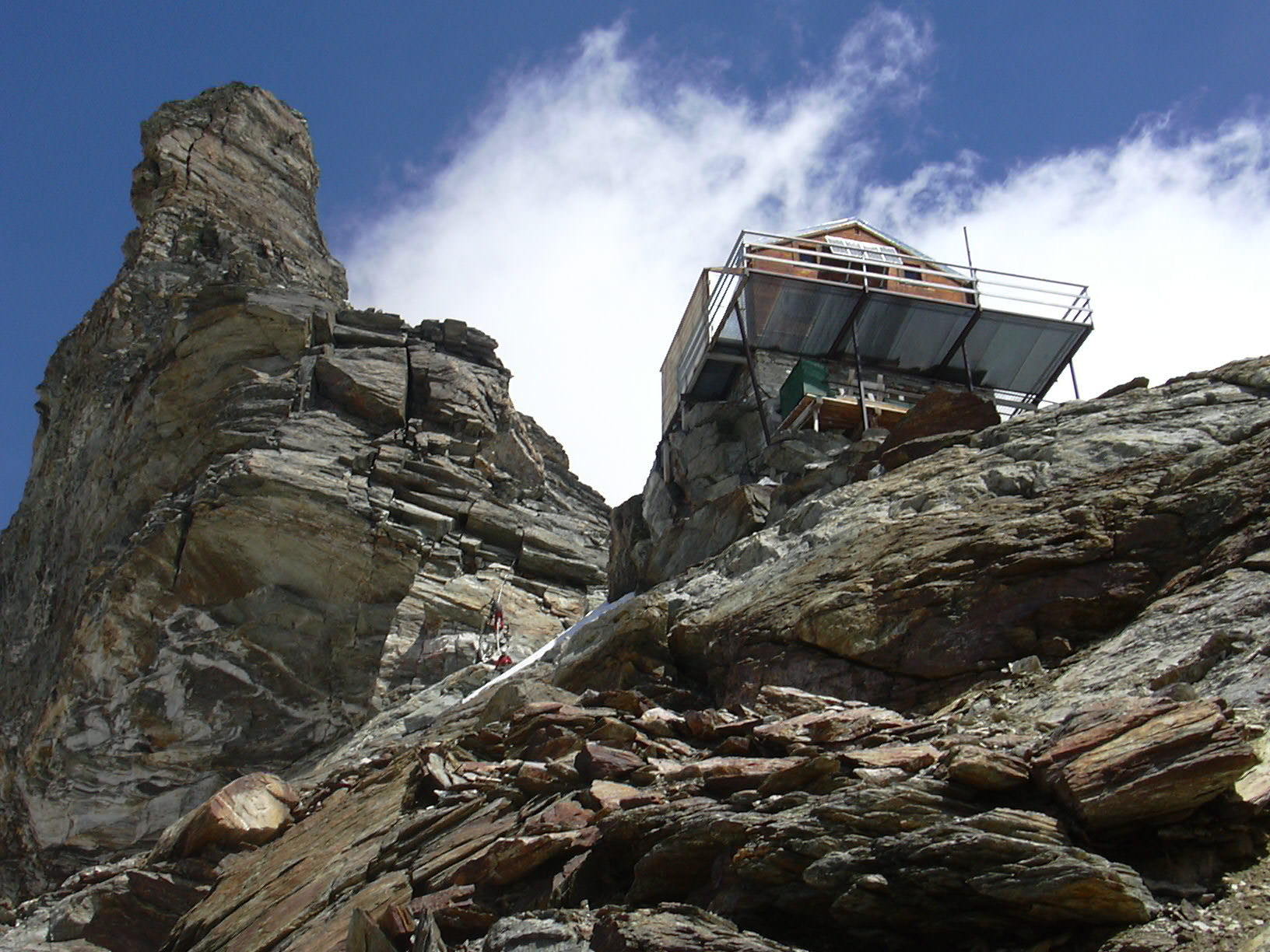
The Rifugio Carrel (3,830 m) on the Lion ridge

Then the party proceeded directly towards the summit, over rocks which for some distance were not particularly difficult until they reached a steeper part of the ridge. Here opinions were divided; Gorret suggested ascending by the ridge and scaling the last tower straight up. Carrel was inclined to traverse to the west of the peak, and thence go up on the Zmutt side. Naturally the wish of Carrel prevailed, for he was the leader and had not lost the habit of command, notwithstanding his defeat. The work at this part was of the very greatest difficulty, and stones and icicles which fell rendered the position of the party very precarious; so much so that they preferred to turn up directly towards the summit, and climb by rocks that Gorret termed "almost perpendicular." The traverse back to the southwest ridge was one of the greatest difficulty and a falling stone wounded Gorret in the arm.

They encountered great difficulty on the ridge, Gorret wrote "this part occupied the most time, and gave us the greatest trouble." At length they arrived at a fault in the rocks which formed a roughly horizontal gallery. They crept along this in the direction of a ridge that descended towards the north-west, or thereabouts, and when close to the ridge, found that they could not climb on to it; but they perceived that, by descending a gully with perpendicular sides, they could reach the ridge at a lower point. The bold Amé Gorret was the heaviest and the strongest of the four, and he was sacrificed for the success of the expedition. He and Meynet remained behind, and lowered the others, one by one, into the gully, "and as for me," wrote Gorret, "in order not to be overcome by sleep, I pointed out to Meynet the beauty of the mountains and of the meadows in the valley." Carrel and Bich clambered up the other side, attained the ridge descending towards the northwest, shortly afterwards gained an easy route and reached the southern end of the summit-ridge. Carrel and Bich only waited long enough to plant a flag by the side of the cairn that Whymper had built three days previously, then descended at once, rejoining the others.

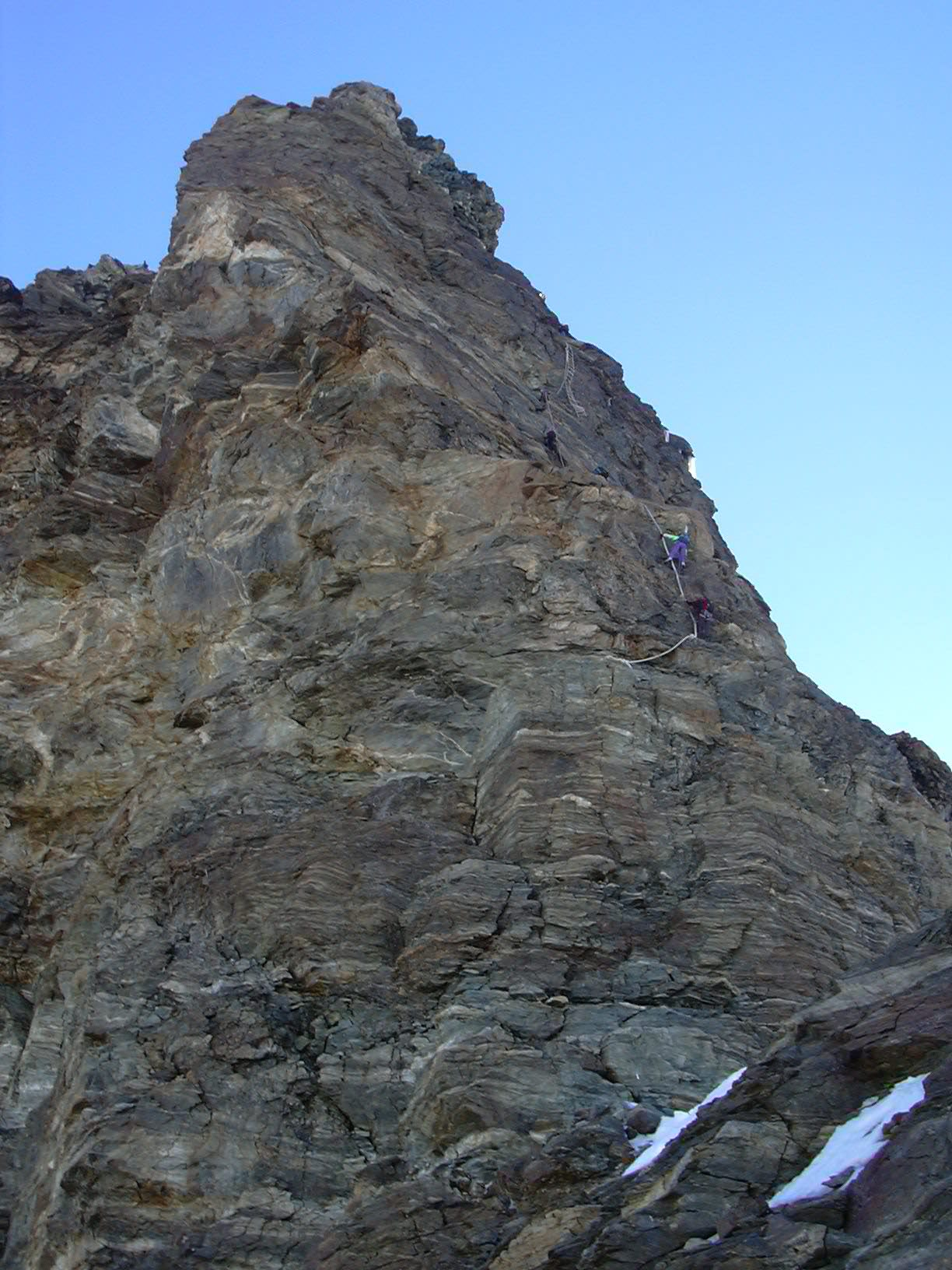
The final section

Meanwhile, Giordano at the Jomein was writing in his diary as follows: "Splendid weather; at 9.30 saw Carrel and his men on the Shoulder, after that saw nothing more of them. Then much mist about the summit. Lifted a bit about 3.30, and we saw our flag on the western summit of the Matterhorn. The English flag looked like a black shawl lying on the snow, in the centre."

All four hurried down as fast as possible to the tent and, at 9 p.m., arrived at their camp at the foot of the Great Tower. They followed as far as the Shoulder a route that was somewhat different from the one they had used on the ascent, and rather easier: that is to say, they traversed the whole length of the ledge of rock on the north-west face of the mountain, which ledge they had named the Corridor, and thus reached the point where the arête of the Shoulder comes to an end against the final peak. This variant was afterwards used by Craufurd Grove, both on the ascent and the descent. On the following day at noon the climbers were back, safe and sound. Giordano's pocket-book mentions " Great hilarity all day at the hotel and at Breuil, bonfires and songs. Amid the rejoicing I alone was sad; I had not personally climbed the Matterhorn." Giordano, sad at heart, fled from these festivities. Important business called him back to Turin; the weather had turned bad. Yet he wrote to Sella from Turin, saying:

"I wished to tell you that, if you wish, you may still climb the Matterhorn and gain some honour as the first 'Monsieur' to do it from the Italian side. So I have had the tent and some ropes left up there. Although we have been forestalled by Whymper, the victory from a practical point of view is ours, because we have now proved that the peak is accessible on our side, while it does not seem as if any other ascent would be attempted in a hurry from Zermatt. Poor Whymper is overcome by his ephemeral victory, while the Val Tournanche is full of joy at the sight of the three-coloured flag calmly waving on the lofty peak. You could still make scientific geological and barometrical observations up there; the peak might still be considered as virgin from this point of view, and we should thus give a solemn proof of the feasibility of the route on the Italian side, and of our calm perseverance in the face of the tragic upshot of the Zermatt ascent."

== See also ==
- Timeline of climbing the Matterhorn
