= Amé Gorret =

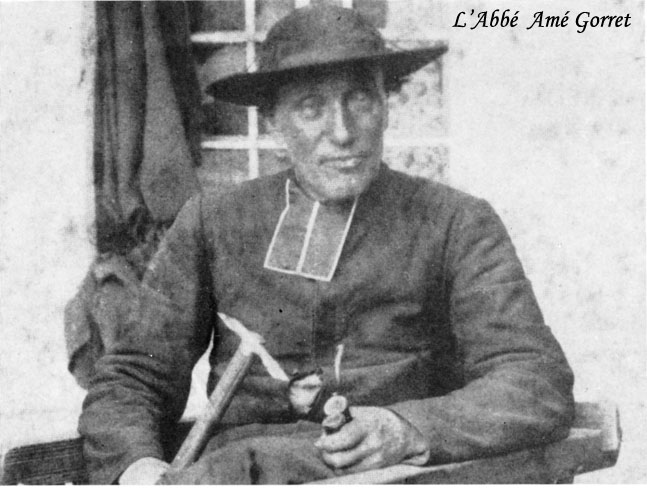
- Native name: l'abbé Gorret (Father Gorret)
- Born: October 25, 1836 Valtournenche, Aosta Valley
- Died: November 4, 1907 (aged 71) Saint-Pierre, Aosta Valley, Italy
- Occupation: Priest and mountaineer

Amé Gorret (1836–1907), known in his native Aosta Valley as the "Abbé Gorret" ("Father Gorret"), was a priest and Alpinist (mountaineer).

He was a member of the group which in 1865 undertook the second successful ascent of the Matterhorn, which was the first such ascent from the Italian side.

Throughout his life he enjoyed a reputation for being unconventional, and was therefore frequently assigned to remote mountain parishes.

== Biography ==
=== Early years ===
Amé Gorret was born on 25 October 1836 at Valtournenche in the Aosta Valley which at that time was in the Kingdom of Sardinia. Amé was the son of Jean-Antoine Gorret, a mountain guide, and of Marie-Véronique Carrel.

He attended school in his home village, and it was also in Valtournenche that he studied for the priesthood with the local priest, and subsequently with the vicar, who suggested he went study at the main seminary in Aosta, where he was ordained on 25 May 1861.

=== The young priest ===
He moved in August 1861 to Champorcher, his first parish. It was at this time that he met Victor Emmanuel the new king of a new country. The two quickly formed a friendship based on a shared love of the mountains and a shared suspicion of the formalities characteristic of political life at the time.

Father Gorret found himself transferred frequently from one parish to another: in 1864 he was moved to Saint-Pierre, and a year later he was moved again, to Cogne.

=== Mountaineering combined with a continuing career in the priesthood ===
On 17 July 1865, with Jean-Antoine Carrel, Jean-Baptiste Bich and Jean-Augustin Meynet, Gorret undertook the second successful ascent of the Matterhorn. This was the first such ascent from the Italian side, and was achieved just three days after another expedition, headed up by Edward Whymper, completed the first recorded ascent of the mountain, by way of the Hörnli ridge on its eastern side. Following the Carrel group's successful ascent it was Gorret who created a wider awareness of the exploit by submitting a report to the local newspaper, the Feuille d’Aoste. After this he became better known both as a mountaineer and as a writer.

In 1866 he was transferred to Valgrisenche. Between 1869 and 1880 further frequent changes of parish ensued. During this period he combined parish duties as the village priest with teaching at the seminary in Aosta and with mountaineering. At this time he got to know a number of the leading figures in Italian mountaineering, then undergoing a period of rapid expansion. In 1863 the Turin based Italian Alpine Club was established.

From 1881 he served as a priest successively in three parishes in the Dauphiné region, across the mountains in France. However, church-state relations were moving up the political agenda in France, and in 1884 the government required the church to repatriate all foreign priests. Gorret was returned to the Val d'Aosta, appointed to the living of Saint-Jacques-des-Allemands where he remained, living in relative poverty, for 21 years.

=== Final years ===
In 1902 his vision began to fail, for which he underwent an operation the next year. He relocated again, back to Saint-Pierre, in 1905. His health became increasingly precarious and he died at Saint-Pierre on 4 November 1907.

== Soubriquets ==
Amé Gorret is most frequently known as "Father Gorret" (the "Abbé Gorret"), but he has also attracted other soubriquets such as "the Mountain bear" ("l'ours de la montagne"), "the Hermit of Saint-Jacques" ("l'ermite de Saint-Jacques") and more simply "the Great Gorret" ("Le Grand Gorret").

== Publications ==
- Amé Gorret, Claude-Nicolas Bich, Guide Illustré de la Vallée d'Aoste, 1876.
- Amé Gorret, Victor-Emmanuel sur les Alpes, 1879.

== Reading list ==
- Alexis Betemps, « Du dernier ours au premier ethnographe : l'abbé Aimé Gorret », Le Monde alpin et rhodanien, 2003, vol. 31, no 1–4, p. 149-159 (lire en ligne)
- Amé Gorret, Autobiographie et écrits divers, Valtournenche : Administration communale de Valtournenche, 1998.
- Xavier Favre, L'ermite de Saint-Jacques, Musumeci Éditeur, Quart, 2007
- Alexis Bétemps, Aimé Gorret, Omega Ed., 2007
