= Refuge Jean-Antoine Carrel =

Refuge in the Alps in Aosta Valley, Italy

Coordinates: 45°58′23″N 7°38′51″E

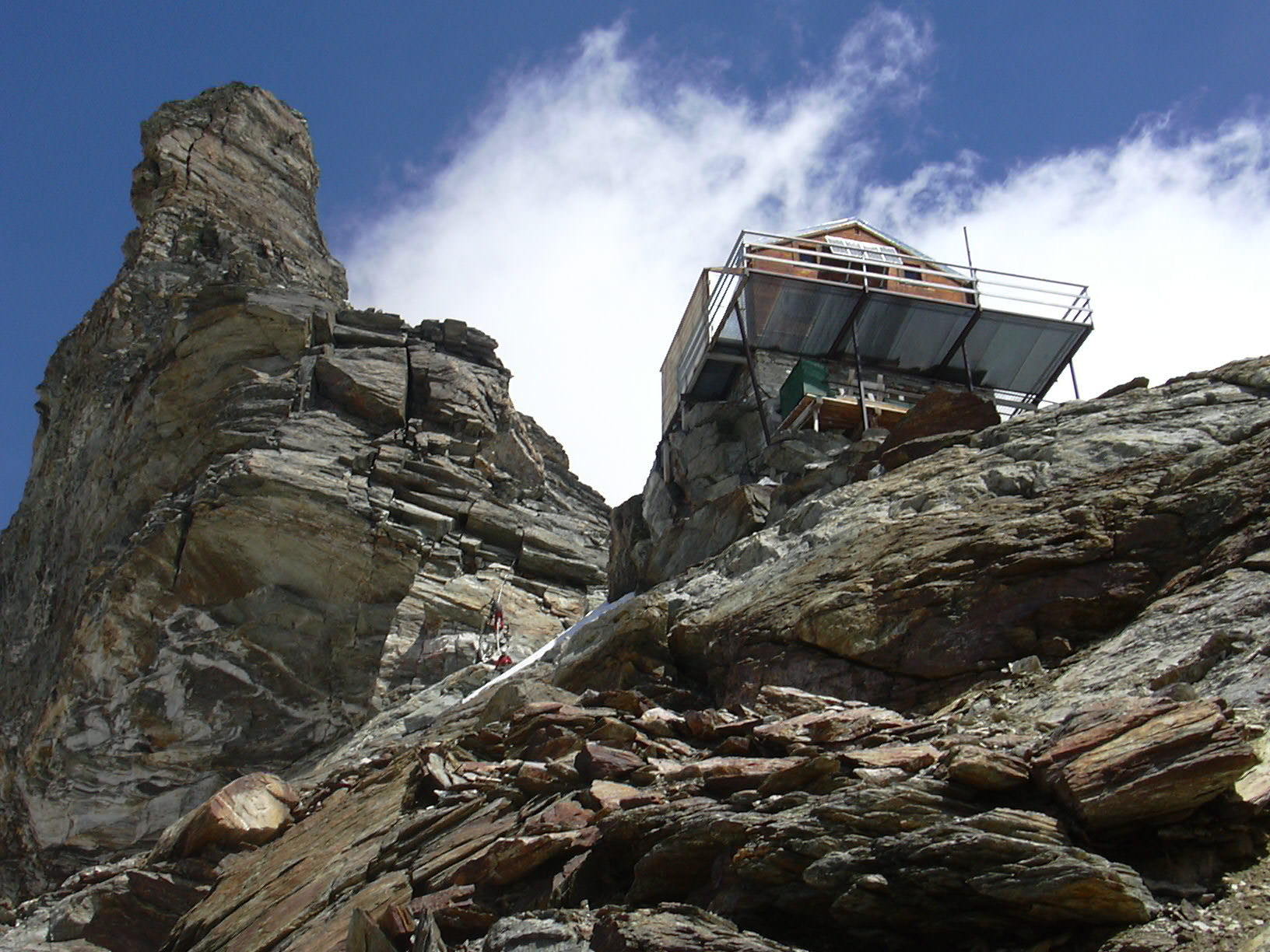

Refuge Jean-Antoine Carrel is a refuge in the Alps at an altitude of 3,830m in Aosta Valley, Italy. It is located on the south-west ridge of the Matterhorn, near the Swiss border.

The mountain hut was named after Jean-Antoine Carrel who made the first ascent of the Matterhorn via the south-west ridge.

It is located along the south-west ridge of the Matterhorn (Arête du lion). The new shelter, owned by the Cervin Mountain Guides' Association (It. Società delle guide del Cervino / Fr. Société des guides du Cervin), was inaugurated in 1969 and partially redone after the major landslides that affected this side of the mountain in 2002–2003. The Carrel shelter has 50 beds and is always open.

The nearby Capanna Luigi Amedeo di Savoia / Cabane Louis-Amédée de Savoie, built in 1905 by the CAI section of Turin, has been transformed into a museum and moved first to Valtournenche and then, in September 2009, in front of the Italian Matterhorn Guide Company office. This bivouac was an alternative shelter to the Carrel refuge, and was heavily damaged in the summer of 2003 following a large landslide (the same that caused the fall of the so-called Cheminée). The platform where the bivouac was located is now used as a landing point for the helicopter.

Access is from Breuil-Cervinia. The refuge can be reached from the Duca degli Abruzzi-refuge (Fr. Refuge Duc des Abruzzes) in a hike of about four hours. The last part of the track, despite the presence of fixed ropes, is reserved for experienced mountaineers.
