= Luigi Carrel =

Italian mountaineer (1901–1983)

Luigi "Louis" Carrel, also known as Carrellino (1901 – 1983) was an Italian mountain climber, mountain guide and ski mountaineer.

== Biography ==
Carrel was the son of the mountain guide Jean-Joseph Carrel and his wife Joséphine Pellissier. He was born in Crétaz (pron. creta) in 1901, and later moved to Cheneil, two villages of Valtournenche. In 1933, he won the first Mezzalama Trophy, together with Valtournenche guides Antoine Gaspard and Piero Maquignaz.

In 1932, he climbed together with Antoine Gaspard and Enzo Benedetti at first the south side of the Matterhorn, and together with Giacomo Chiara and Alfredo Perino at first completely the Furggen ridge (Furggengrat) of the same mountain during World War II.

He also took part in several expeditions to the Gran Paradiso and in the Dolomites as well as in South America, especially in the Patagonian region, where he climbed in the group of the Chilean Andes, on the Monte Fitz Roy and on the Cerro Torre.

His son Antonio is also an alpine guide.

== Literature ==
- Giovanni Zanetti: "Luigi Carrel. Una vita per l'Alpinismo", 2002
