= First ascent of the Matterhorn =

1865 expedition in the Pennine Alps

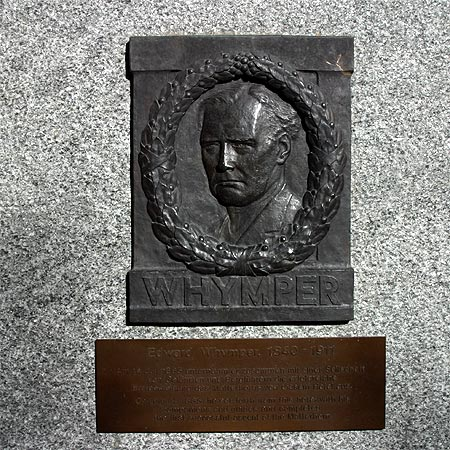
Plaque in Zermatt, commemorating the first ascent by Edward Whymper: On 14 July 1865, he set forth from this hotel with his companions and guides, and completed the first successful ascent of the Matterhorn.

The first ascent of the Matterhorn was a mountaineering expedition of the Matterhorn made by Edward Whymper, Lord Francis Douglas, Charles Hudson, Douglas Hadow, Michel Croz, and two Zermatt guides, Peter Taugwalder and his son of the same name, on 14 July 1865. Douglas, Hudson, Hadow and Croz were killed on the descent when Hadow slipped and pulled the other three with him down the north face. Whymper and the Taugwalder guides, who survived, were later accused of having cut the rope to ensure that they were not dragged down with the others, but the subsequent inquiry found no evidence of this and they were acquitted.

The ascent followed a long series of usually separate attempts by Edward Whymper and Jean-Antoine Carrel to reach the summit. Carrel's group had been 200 m below the summit on the Italian side when Croz and Whymper summited. The climbers from Valtournenche withdrew deflated, but three days later Carrel and Jean-Baptiste Bich reached the summit without incident. The Matterhorn was the last great Alpine peak to be climbed and its first ascent marked the end of the golden age of alpinism.

== Background and preparations ==
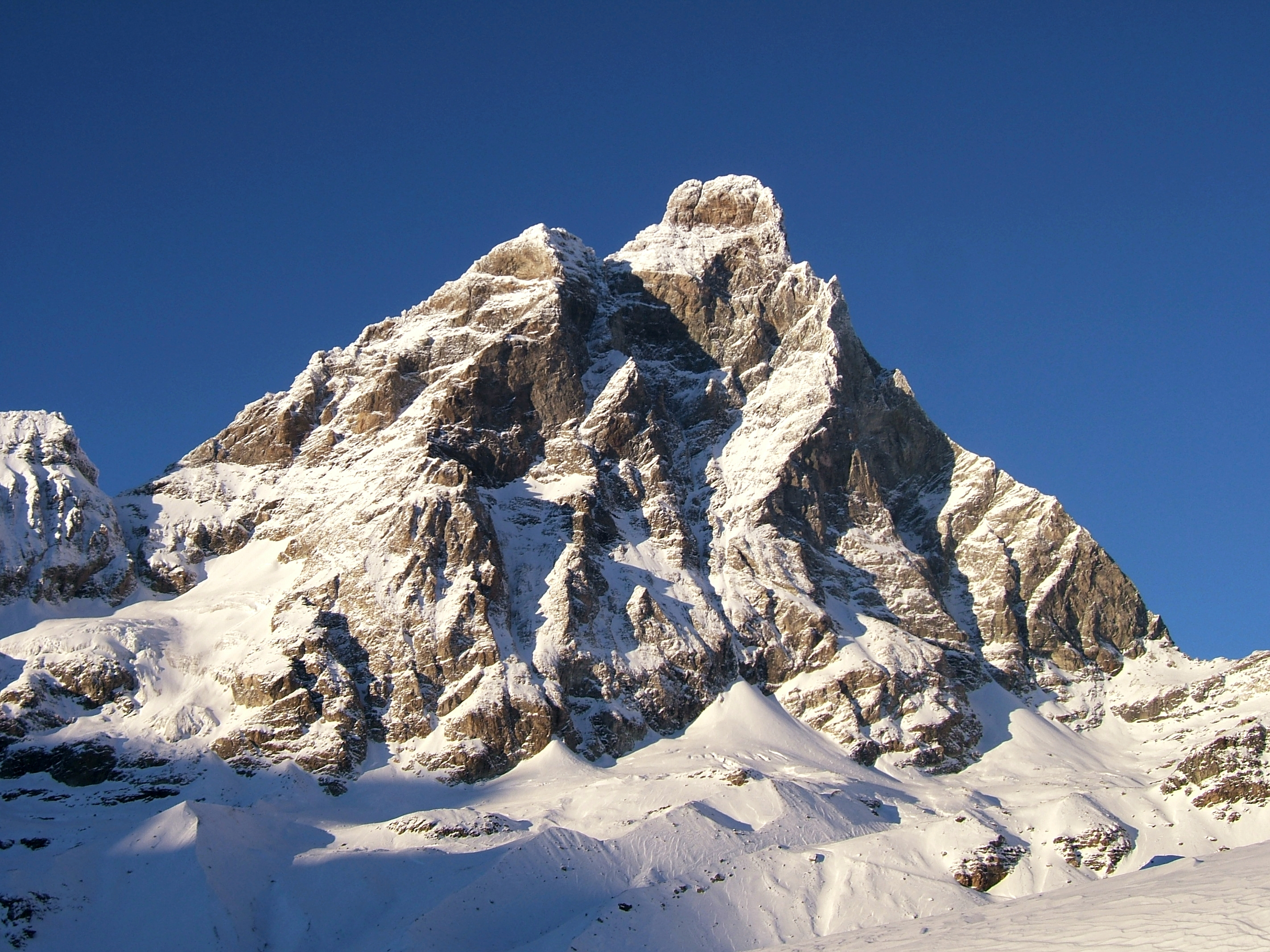
The south face. The first attempts took place on the Lion ridge (left).

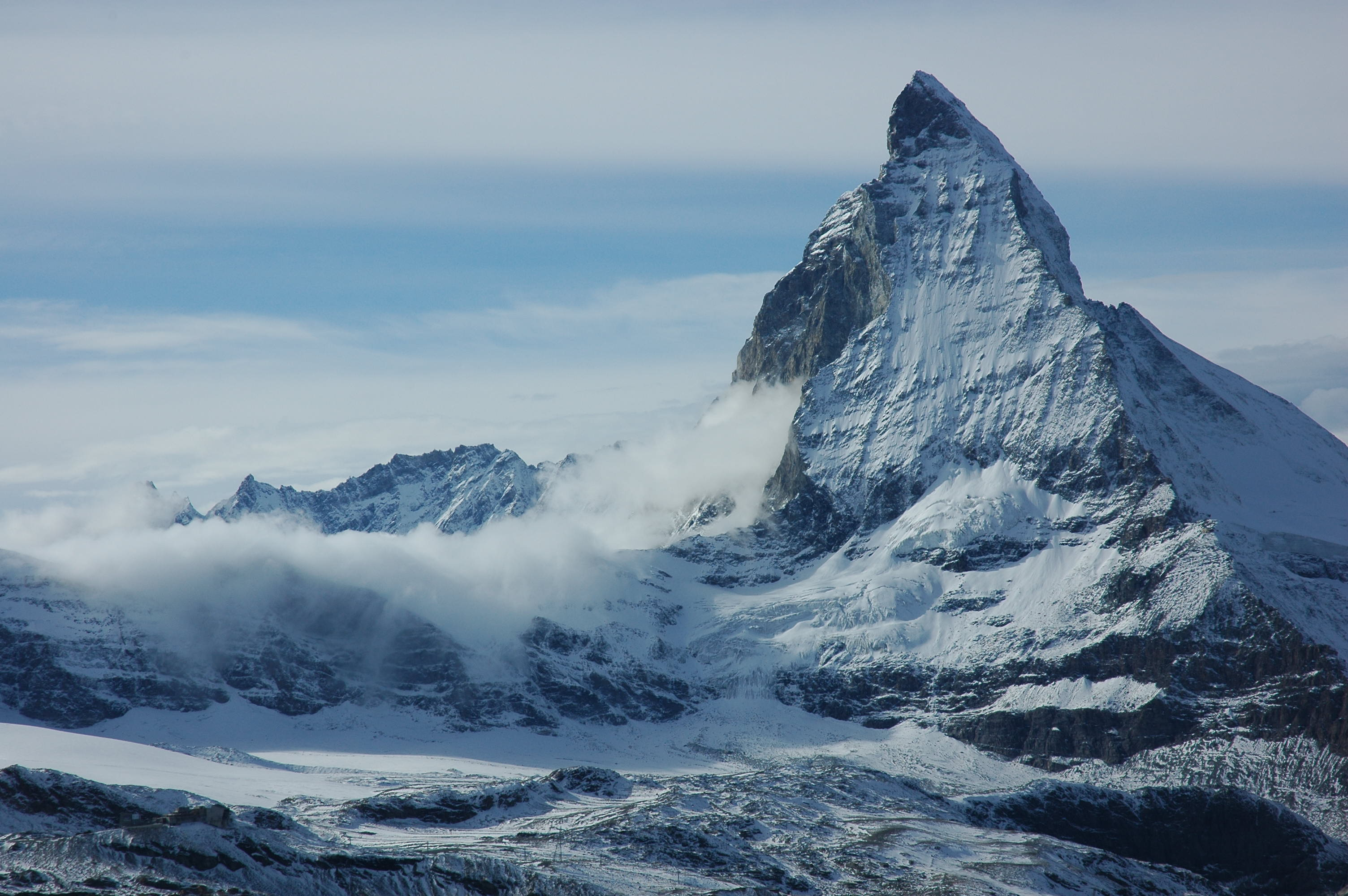
The east face and Hörnli ridge on the right

In the summer of 1860, Edward Whymper, an athletic, twenty-year-old British artist, visited the Alps for the first time. He had been hired by a London publisher to make sketches and engravings of the scenic mountains along the border of Switzerland and Italy. He soon became interested in mountaineering and decided to attempt the yet unconquered Matterhorn. Whymper soon found that Jean-Antoine Carrel, an Italian guide from the Valtournanche, had attempted to be the first to reach the summit of the Matterhorn since 1857. Between 1861 and 1865, both made several attempts by the south-west ridge together but became progressively rivals, according to Whymper because Carrel patriotically believed that a native Italian like himself and not an Englishman like Whymper should be the first to set foot on the summit.

In 1865, Whymper, weary of the defeats he had sustained on the southwest ridge, tried a new way. The stratification of the rocks on the east face seemed to him favourable, and the slope not excessive. His plan of attack was complicated: a huge rock couloir, the base of which lies on the Italian side below the Breuiljoch, on the little Matterhorn glacier, would be ascended to a point high up on the Furggen ridge; from there, traversing the east face of the mountain, he meant to reach the Hörnli (north-east) ridge and follow it to the summit. However, when this route was attempted, an avalanche of stone caused the ascent to fail. His guides refused to make any further attempts by this route.

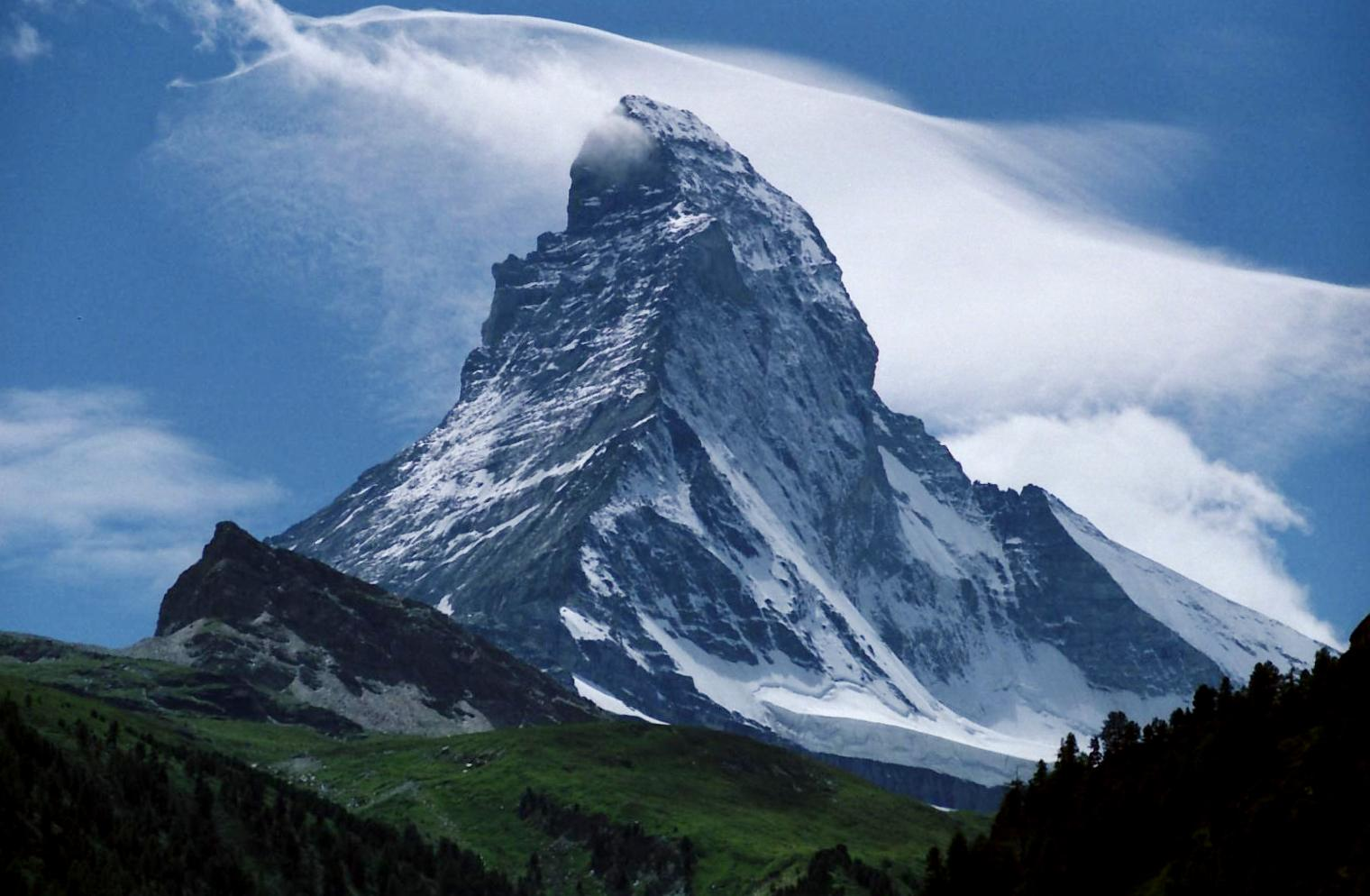
The Matterhorn from Zermatt

In the meantime, Carrel had spoken with Whymper and had engaged himself for an attempt on the Swiss side until Tuesday, 11 July, inclusive, if the weather were fine; but the weather turned bad and he was thus free. On the morning of 9 July, Whymper, as he was descending to Valtournanche, was surprised to meet Carrel with a traveller, who was coming up with a great deal of baggage. He questioned Carrel, who told him that he would be unable to serve him after 11 July, because he had an engagement with a "family of distinction"; and when Whymper reproached him for not having told him so before, he replied that the engagement dated from a long time back, and until then the day had not been fixed. Whymper had as yet no suspicion that the "distinguished family" was Felice Giordano but he became aware of it in Breuil on the morning of the 11th, when the guides had already started to explore, and he learnt that everything had been made ready long before for the expedition which was to prepare the way for Quintino Sella.

Having rolled up his tent and packed his luggage, Whymper wished to hasten to Zermatt to attempt to reach the summit from that side, but he could find no porters. A young fellow Briton arrived with a guide. Whymper made himself known to him, and learnt that he was Lord Francis Douglas, who had lately ascended the Ober Gabelhorn; he told him the whole story, and confided his plans to him. Douglas, declaring himself in his turn most anxious to ascend the Matterhorn, agreed to give him his porter, and on the morning of 12 July, they started together for the Theodul pass. They descended to Zermatt, sought and engaged Peter Taugwalder, and gave him permission to choose another guide. When they returned to the Monte Rosa Hotel, they encountered Michel Croz, who had been hired by Charles Hudson. They had come to Zermatt with the same intention, to attempt to ascend the Matterhorn. Hudson and his friend Douglas Hadow decided to join Whymper and Douglas and that same evening everything was settled; they were to start the very next day.

== Ascent ==
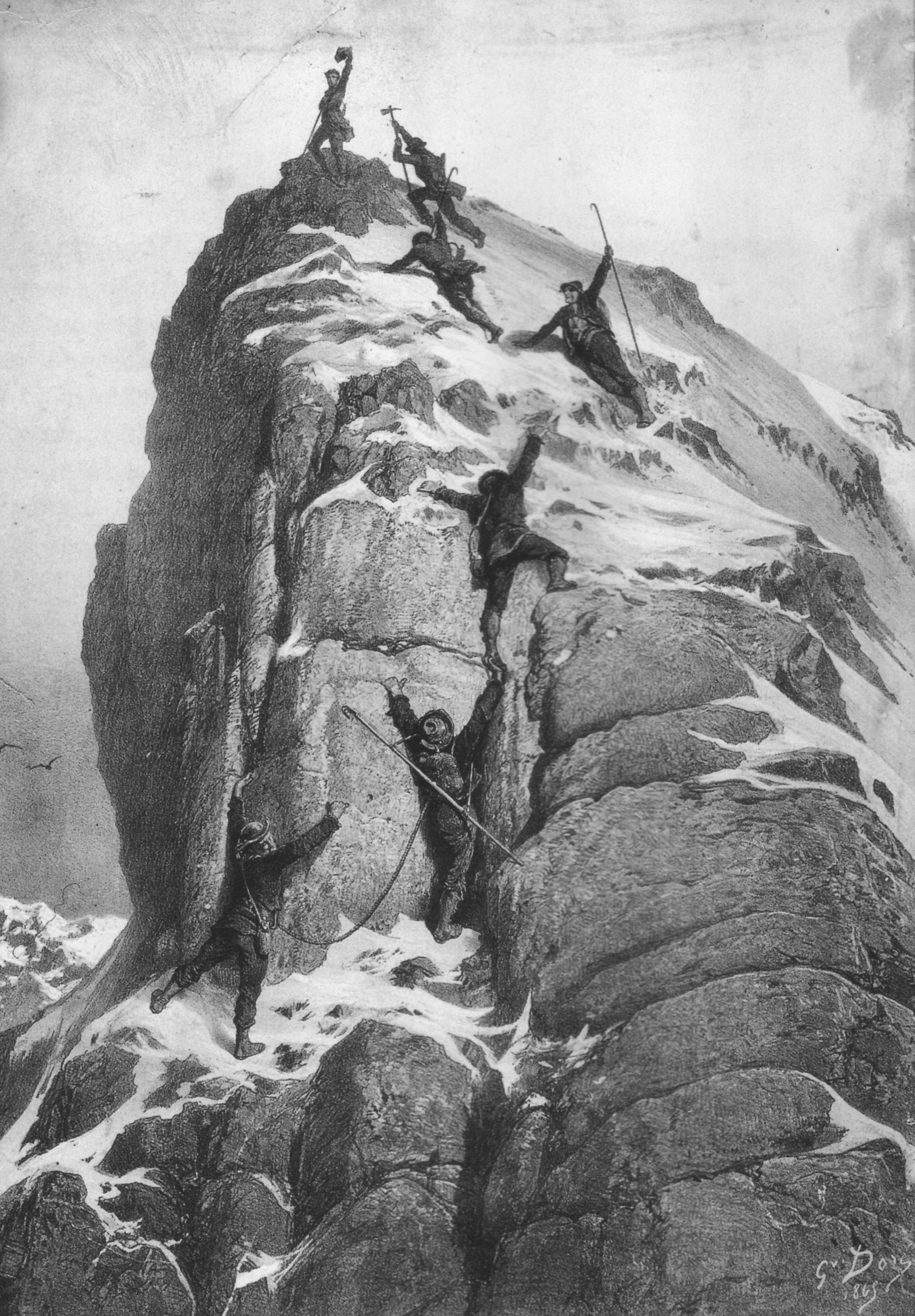
The First Ascent of the Matterhorn by Gustave Doré

The party started from Zermatt on 13 July at 5:30 a.m. The eight members included Peter Taugwalder and his two sons, Peter and Joseph, who were acting as porters. At 8:20 a.m. they reached the chapel at Schwarzsee, where they picked up some material that was left there. They continued along the ridge and at half past eleven they reached the base of the peak. Then they left the ridge and proceeded for half an hour on the east face. Before noon they had found a good position for the tent, and at a height of 3,380 metres (11,090 ft) they set the bivouac. Meanwhile, Croz and young Peter Taugwalder went on to explore the route, in order to save time on the following day. They turned back before 3 p.m., reporting that that ridge offered no great difficulties.

On the morning of 14 July, they assembled together outside the tent and started directly at dawn. Young Peter Taugwalder came on with them as a guide, and his brother, Joseph, returned to Zermatt. They followed the route which had been explored on the previous day, and in a few minutes came in view of the east face:

The whole of this great slope was now revealed, rising for 3,000 feet like a huge natural staircase. Some parts were more, and others were less, easy; but we were not once brought to a halt by any serious impediment, for when an obstruction was met in front it could always be turned to the right or left. For the greater part of the way there was, indeed, no occasion for the rope, and sometimes Hudson led, sometimes myself.

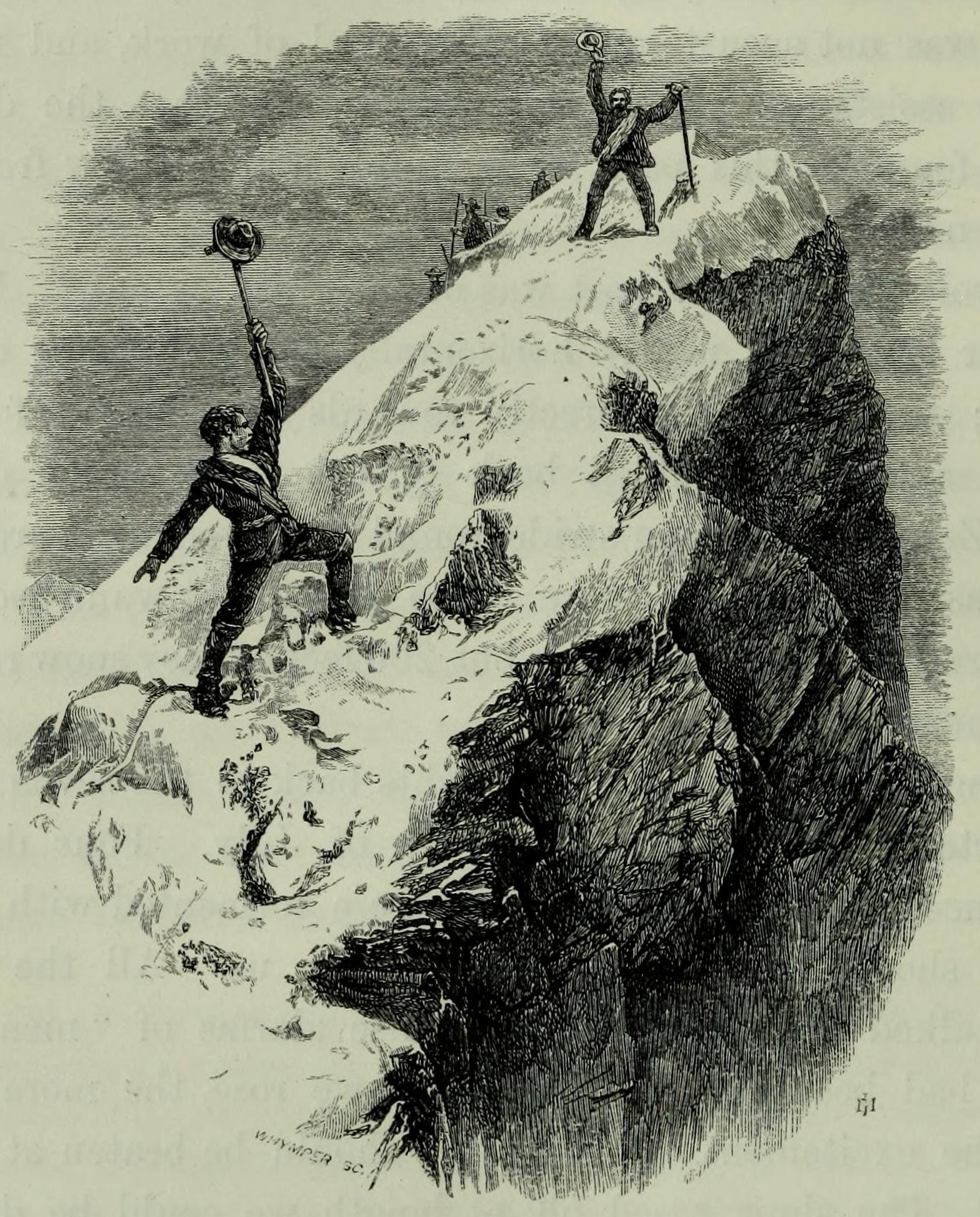
Illustration by Whymper

They went up unroped and, at 6:20 a.m., reached a height of 12,800 feet (3,900 m). After a half-hour break, they proceeded until 9:55 a.m., when they stopped for fifty minutes at a height of 14,000 feet (4,300 m). They had arrived at the foot of the much steeper upper peak that lies above the shoulder. Because it was too steep and difficult they had to leave the ridge for the north face. At this point of the ascent, Whymper wrote that the less experienced Hadow "required continual assistance". Having overcome these difficulties the group finally arrived near the summit. When they saw that only two hundred feet of easy snow remained, Croz and Whymper detached themselves and reached the top first.

The slope eased off, and Croz and I, dashing away, ran a neck-and-neck race, which ended in a dead heat. At 1.40 p.m. the world was at our feet, and the Matterhorn was conquered. Hurrah! Not a footstep could be seen.

After having checked that no foot traces were present on the other extremity of the summit, that might have been reached by the Italian expedition, Whymper, peering over the cliff, saw Carrel and party at a great distance below. They were precisely at this moment 200 metres below, still ascending and dealing with the most difficult parts of the ridge. Whymper and Croz yelled and poured stones down the cliffs to attract their attention. When seeing his rival on the summit, Carrel and party gave up on their attempt and went back to Breuil. A note appears in Felice Giordano's diary, in which, dated 14 July, is the following note: "... At 2 p.m. they saw Whymper and six others on the top; this froze them, as it were, and they all turned and descended. ..." He wrote a letter to his friend Quintino Sella:

Dear Quintino, yesterday was a bad day, and Whymper, after all, gained the victory over the unfortunate Carrel. Whymper, as I told you, was desperate, and seeing Carrel climbing the mountain, tried his fortune on the Zermatt slope. Every one here, and Carrel above all, considered the ascent absolutely impossible on that side; so we were all easy in our minds. On the 11th Carrel was at work on the mountain, and pitched his tent at a certain height. On the night between the 11th and 12th, and the whole of the 12th, the weather was horrible, and snow on the Matterhorn; on the 13th weather fair, and yesterday the 14th fine. On the 13th little work was done, and yesterday Carrel might have reached the top, and was perhaps only about 500 or 600 feet below, when suddenly, at about 2 p.m., he saw Whymper and the others already on the summit.

== Descent ==
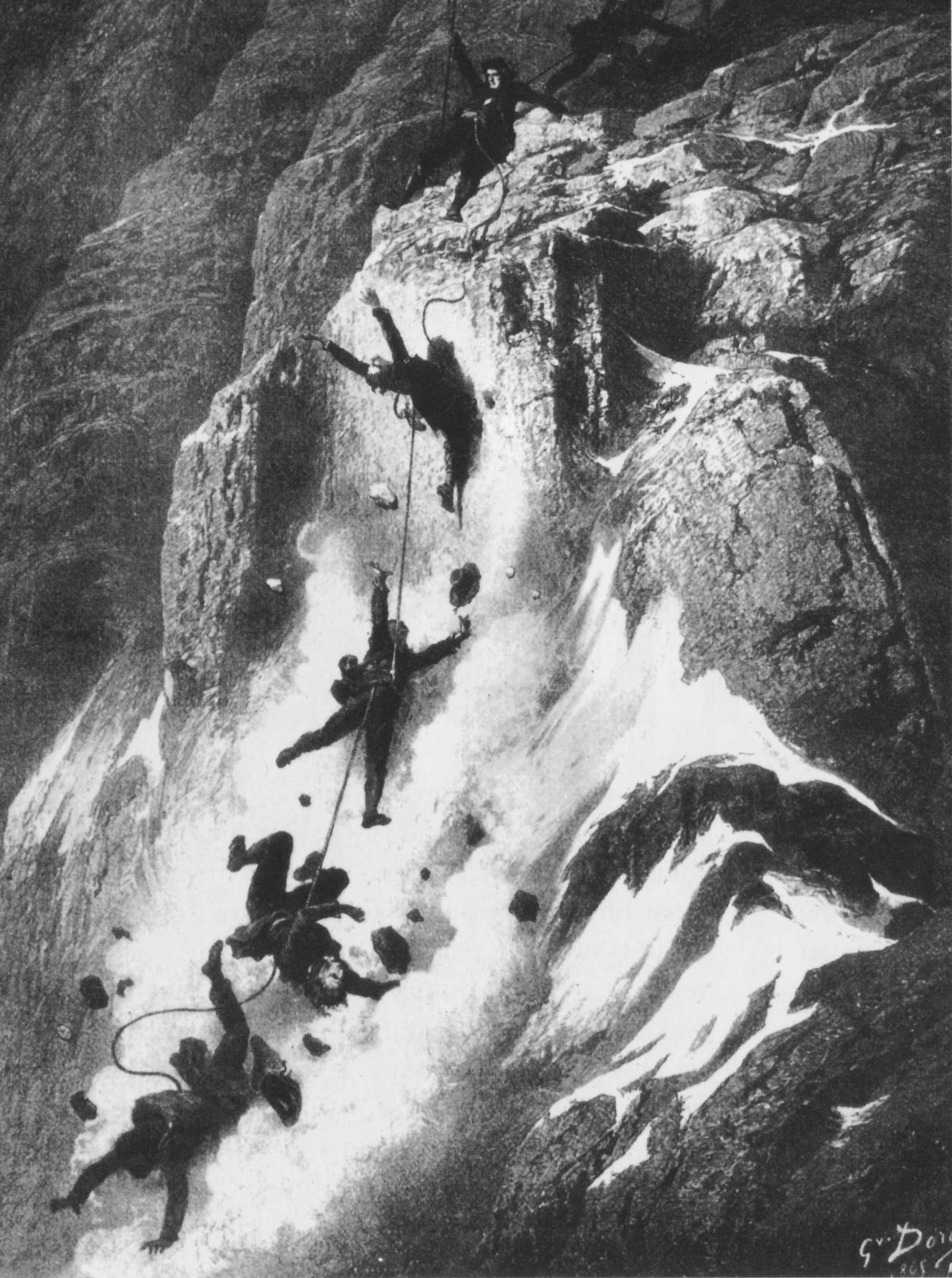
The Matterhorn Disaster by Gustave Doré

Whymper and party stayed an hour on the summit. Then they began their descent. Croz descended first, then Hadow, Hudson and Douglas, Taugwalder senior, Whymper with Taugwalder junior coming last. They climbed down with great care, only one man moving at a time. When they were barely an hour from the summit and were all on the rope, Hadow slipped and fell on Croz, who was in front of him. Croz was unprepared and unable to withstand the shock; they both fell and pulled down Hudson and Douglas. On hearing Croz's shout, Whymper and Taugwalder clasped the rocks; they stood firm but the rope broke. Whymper saw them slide down the slope, trying with convulsive hands to stop themselves, and then falling from rock to rock and finally disappearing over the edge of the precipice.

In a letter to The Times, Whymper wrote:

As far as I know, at the moment of the accident no one was actually moving. I cannot speak with certainty, neither can the Taugwalders, because the two leading men were partially hidden from our sight by an intervening mass of rock. Poor Croz had laid aside his axe, and, in order to give Mr. Hadow greater security, was absolutely taking hold of his legs and putting his feet, one by one, into their proper positions. From the movements of their shoulders it is my belief that Croz, having done as I have said, was in the act of turning round to go down a step or two himself; at this moment Mr. Hadow slipped, fell on him, and knocked him over. I heard one startled exclamation from Croz, then saw him and Mr. Hadow flying downwards; in another moment Hudson was dragged from his steps and Lord F. Douglas immediately after him. All this was the work of a moment; but immediately we heard Croz's exclamation, Taugwalder and myself planted ourselves as firmly as the rocks would permit; the rope was tight between us, and the shock came on us as on one man. We held; but the rope broke midway between Taugwalder and Lord F. Douglas. For two or three seconds we saw our unfortunate companions sliding downwards on their backs, and spreading out their hands endeavouring to save themselves; they then disappeared one by one and fell from precipice to precipice on to the Matterhorn glacier below, a distance of nearly 4,000 feet [1,200 m] in height. From the moment the rope broke it was impossible to help them.

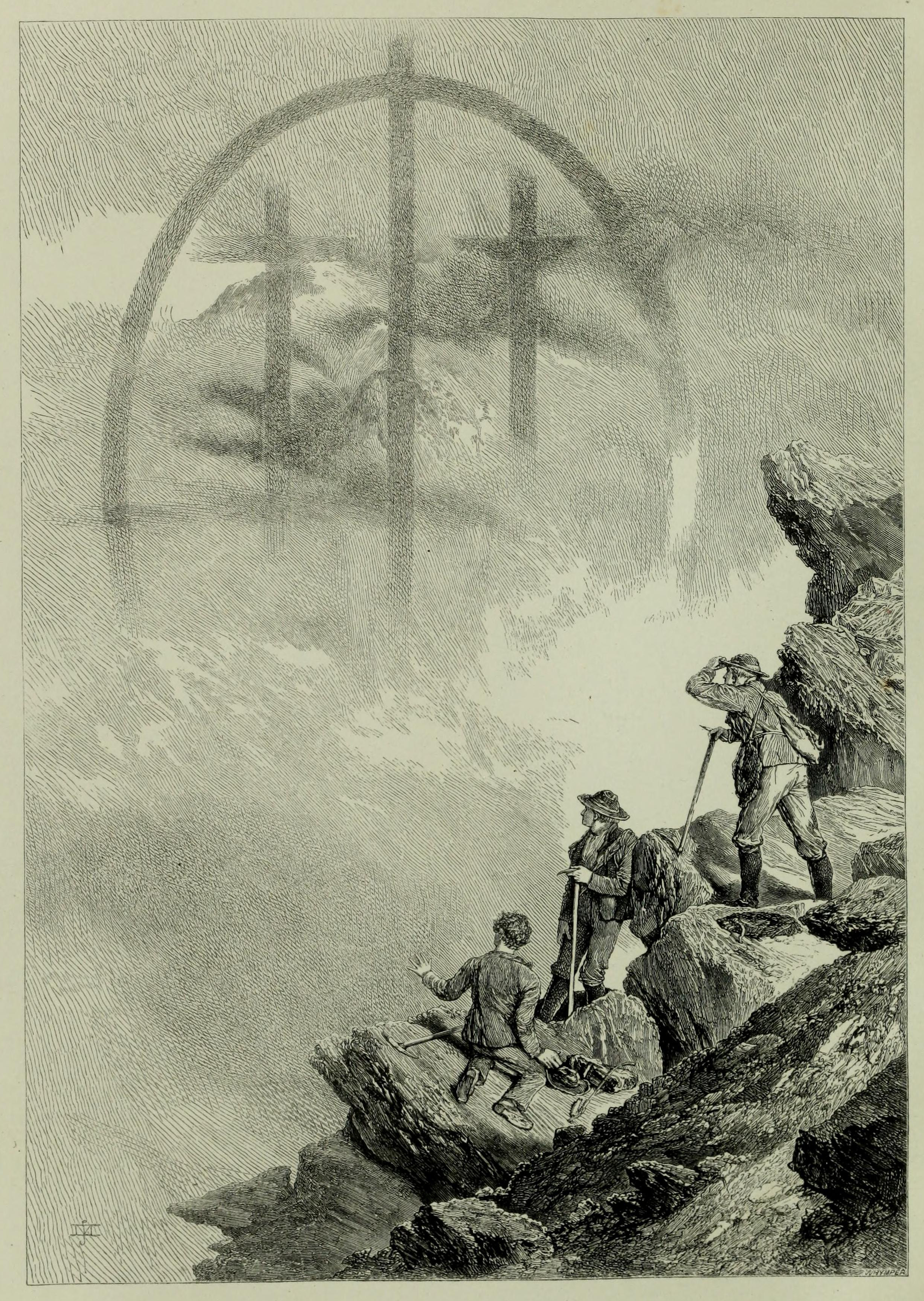
Fog-bow Seen from the Matterhorn by Whymper

After they could fix some rope on firm rocks and secure themselves they were able to proceed and continue the descent. They finally reached a safer place on the ridge towards 6:00 p.m. They looked for traces of their companions and cried to them but in vain. After having seen a curious weather phenomenon in the form of an arch and two crosses (later determined as a fog bow by Whymper), they continued the descent and found a resting place at 9:30 p.m. They could resume the descent at daybreak and reach Zermatt on the morning of Saturday, 15 July.

== Rescue ==
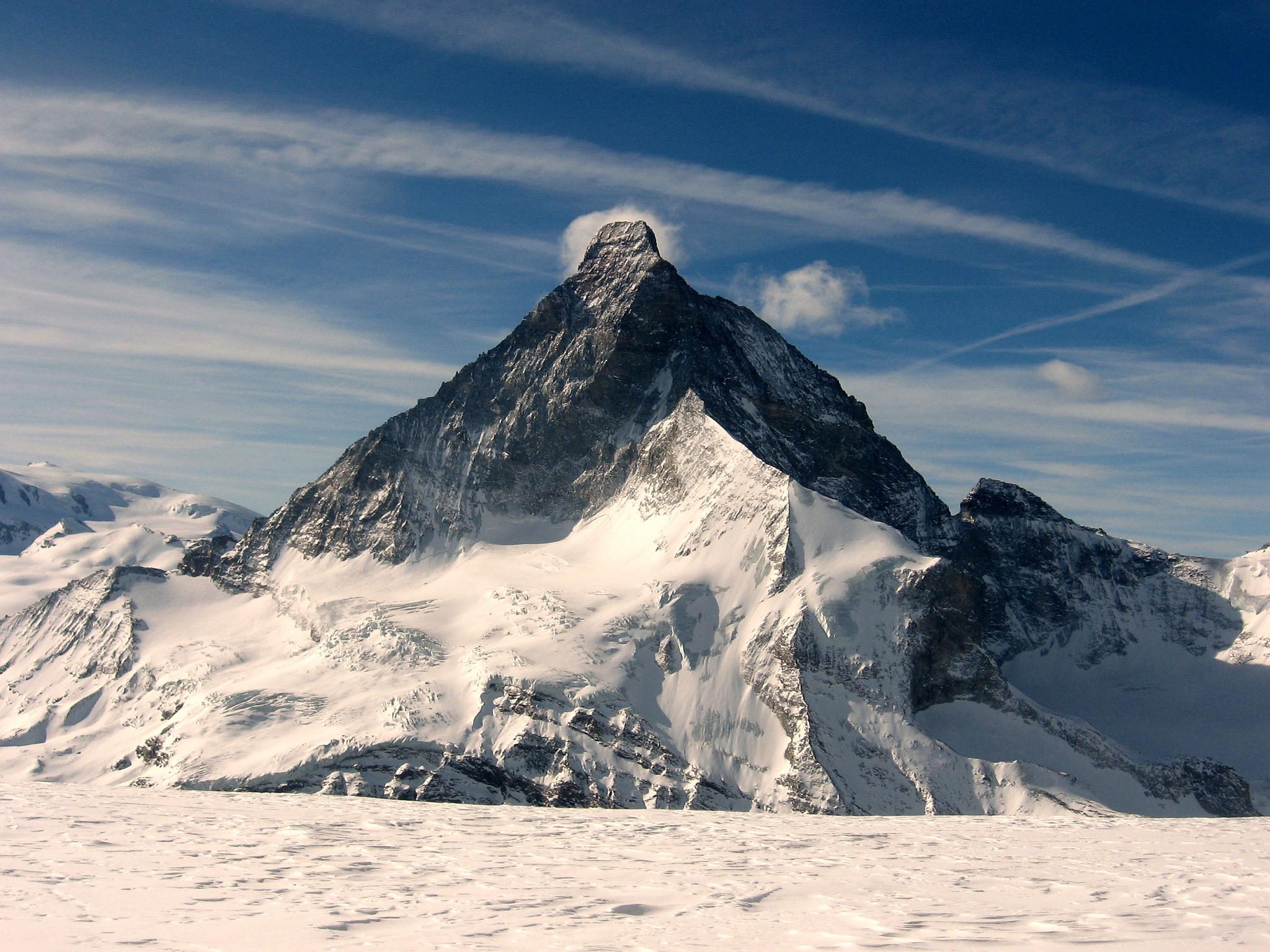
The Matterhorn Glacier and the north face

On Saturday, a group of people from Zermatt had started to ascend the Hohlicht heights, above the Zmutt valley, which commanded the plateau of the Matterhorn Glacier. They returned after six hours and reported that they had seen the bodies lying motionless on the snow. They proposed that the rescuers should leave on Sunday evening, so as to arrive upon the plateau at daybreak on Monday. Whymper and J. M'Cormick decided to start on Sunday morning. The guides of Zermatt, threatened with excommunication by their priests if they failed to attend the early mass, were not willing to go. Other people came to help: J. Robertson, J. Phillpotts and another Briton offered themselves and their guides, Josef Marie Alexander Lochmatter, and Franz Andenmatten. Other guides (Frederic Payot and Jean Tairraz) also volunteered.

At 8:30, after having passed the seracs of the Matterhorn Glacier, Whymper and others reached the top of the plateau. Shortly after they discovered the bodies of Croz, Hadow and Hudson. Of Douglas, only a sleeve was discovered. The bodies were recovered later on Wednesday 19 July after an order of the administration. This task was done by 21 men from Zermatt. Croz, Hadow and Hudson were buried on either side of the Zermatt Church. The body of Douglas was not found.

After the accident John Tyndall conceived a complicated device, involving an enormous length of rope for trying to recover the body of Douglas, but it was never used.

== Accident controversy ==
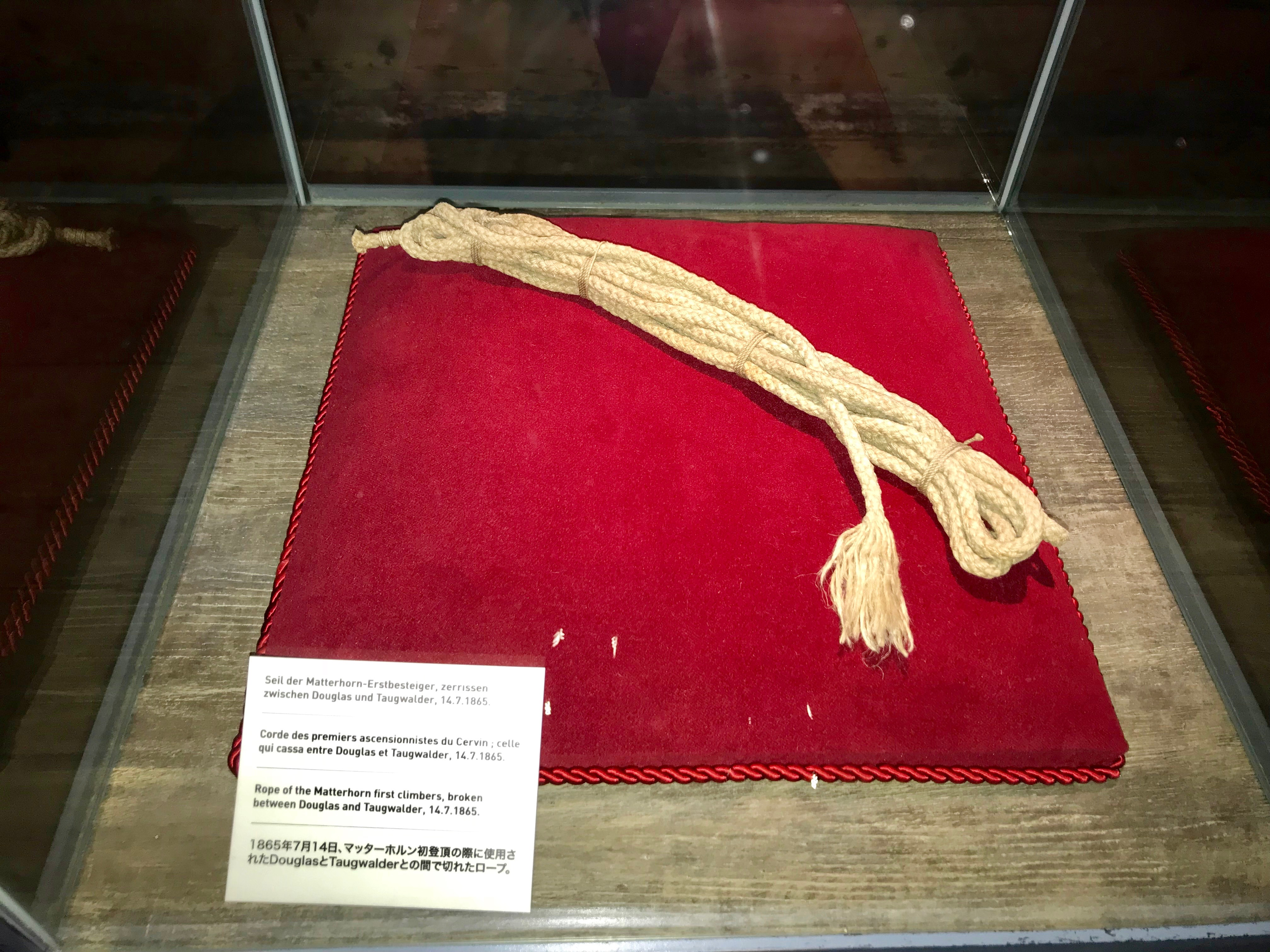
The rope used for the ascent

Shortly after the accident, Whymper asked Taugwalder to see the rope and to his surprise, he saw that it was the oldest and weakest of the ropes they brought and it was only intended as a reserve. All those who had fallen had been tied with a Manila rope, or with a second and equally strong one, and consequently, it had been only between the survivors and those who had fallen where the weaker rope had been used. Whymper also had suggested to Hudson that they should have attached a rope to the rocks on the most difficult place, and held it as they descended, as an additional protection. Hudson approved the idea, but it was never done.

Whymper had then to answer grave charges of responsibility and the accusation of having betrayed his companions. An inquiry, presided over by Joseph Clemenz, was instituted by the government of the canton of Valais. The guide Peter Taugwalder was charged, tried, and acquitted. Notwithstanding the result of the inquiry, some guides and climbers at Zermatt and elsewhere persisted in asserting that he cut the rope between him and Lord Francis Douglas to save his life.

The accident was long discussed in the press, in Switzerland and abroad. Newspapers all over the world reported the tragedy and no other Alpine event had to that date ever caused more headlines. The emotions were hottest in the United Kingdom of Great Britain and Ireland, where the grief soon gave way to indignation. Queen Victoria even suggested that climbing should be banned.

Whymper wrote at the time to the Secretary of the I.A.C. His letter ends thus:

A single slip, or a single false step, has been the sole cause of this frightful calamity.... But, at the same time, it is my belief no accident would have happened had the rope between those who fell been as tight, or nearly as tight, as it was between Taugwalder and myself." Their rope was a weak one; it does not appear to have been cut by the rocks, but to have been broken by the shock and the weight it was called upon to sustain. It is said Croz held Hadow for an instant, and still tried to check the fall even after Hudson and Douglas had been pulled out of their steps, but in vain; his last word was "Impossible!" so the Taugwalders said.

== Museum ==
In the Matterhorn Museum the broken piece of rope from the first ascent is kept in a glass cabinet.

== Commemoration in 2015 ==
In the week of 14 July 2015, the 150th anniversary of the first ascent was commemorated including a ceremony with cleric Revd. Alan Purser, Seasonal Chaplain of St. Peter's, the English Church in Zermatt. Local authorities on both the Swiss and Italian side prohibited climbing the mountain on the exact date of the anniversary and proclaimed a police enforced "Tag der Stille" (Day of Quietness), in order to prevent accidents by overcrowding and as a sign of respect for the mountain and its more than 500 casualties.

A performance of the play The Matterhorn Story written by Livia Anne Richard, at the open air theatre near the Riffelberg tramway station on the Gorner Ridge re-enacted events and speculations around the first ascent.

On 17 July 2017, a simultaneous ascent of the mountain from four sides was organized, and a light show marking the itinerary of the first ascent on evenings until the end of September.

== Portrayals in film ==
The 1928 silent German-Swiss film Struggle for the Matterhorn portrays the ascent, and starred Luis Trenker as Jean-Antoine Carrel. In 1938 the film was remade in sound as The Mountain Calls (Der Berg ruft!) with Trenker both directing and starring. A separate British version The Challenge was made, also featuring Trenker, together with Robert Douglas as Whymper.

The 1959 film Third Man on the Mountain was a fictional account of the ascent, although the mountain was called the Citadel in the movie.

== See also ==
- Second ascent of the Matterhorn
