= Pic Tyndall =

Minor summit below the Matterhorn

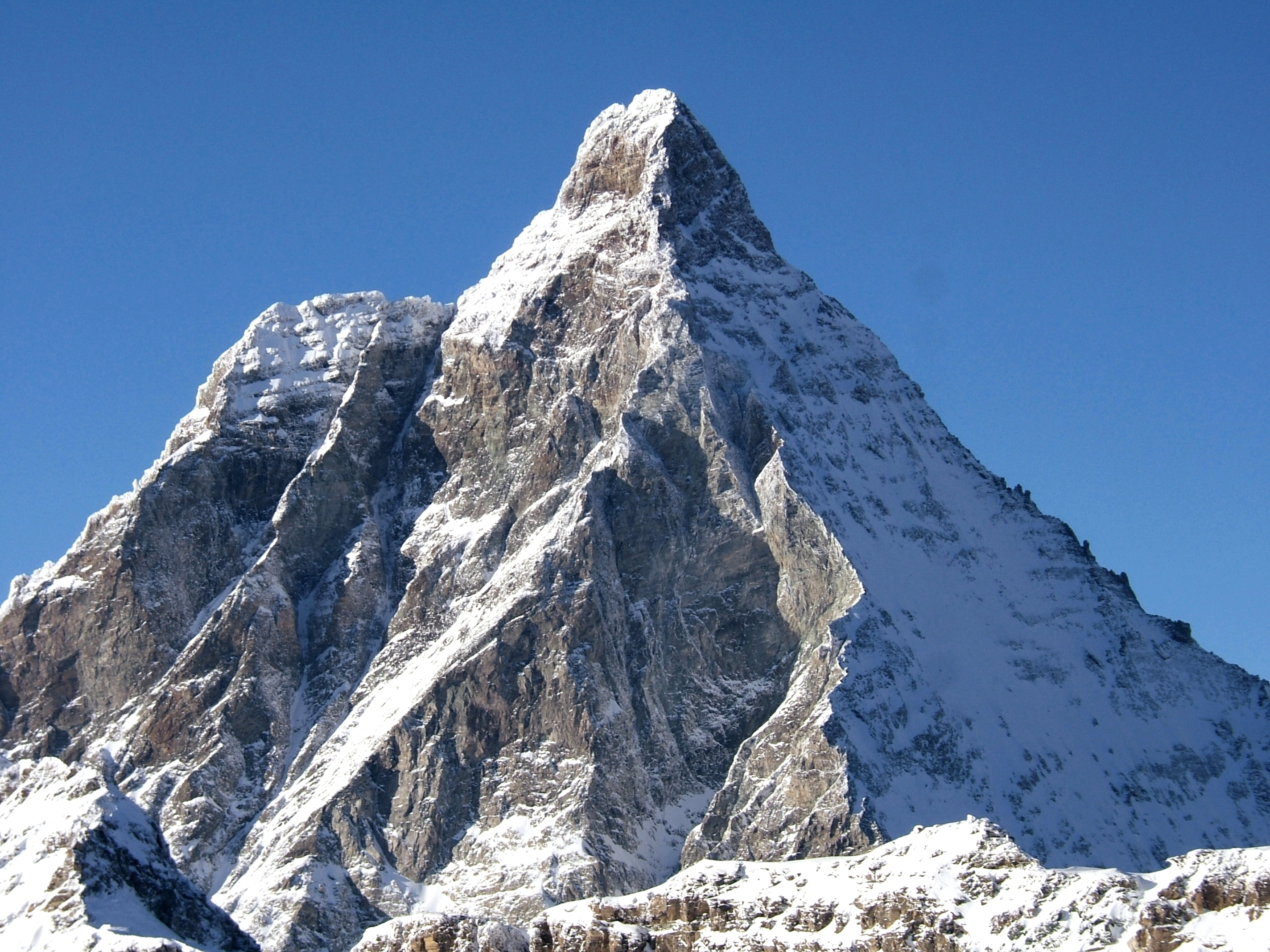
- The Matterhorn and the Pic Tyndall (left), from the southeast side

Highest point
- Elevation: 4,241 m (13,914 ft)
- Parent peak: Matterhorn
- Coordinates: 45°58′29.8″N 7°39′15.8″E

Geography
- Location within Alps
- Location: Switzerland / Italy
- Parent range: Pennine Alps

Climbing
- First ascent: July 28, 1863 by John Tyndall and party

Pic Tyndall (from French: lit, Tyndall Peak) is a minor summit below the Matterhorn (western shoulder) in the Pennine Alps, on the boundary between Aosta Valley (northern Italy) and Switzerland. Because of its small prominence it was included in the enlarged list of alpine four-thousanders. It was named in honour of John Tyndall who made the first ascent.

== First ascent ==
Pic Tyndall was not considered as a goal in itself but it was located on the Lion ridge, where most of the attempts to climb the Matterhorn took place. Its summit was effectively reached during one of those attempts by John Tyndall accompanied by his guides Johann Joseph Bennen and Walter. Jean-Antoine Carrel and César Carrel were engaged as porters. The five men started from Breuil on July 27, 1863.

A wooden ladder, which Tyndall had taken with him, helped them over the most difficult passage, subsequently named the "grande corde". They could not go any higher than Pic Tyndall since the cleft that separated it from the final peak of the Matterhorn, named the enjambée, stopped them. It was at the time, the highest altitude reached by man on the Matterhorn.

John Tyndall wrote:

"We reached the first summit, and planted a flag upon it. Walters, however, who was an exceedingly strong and competent guide, but without the genius which is fired by difficulty, had previously remarked, with reference to the last precipice of the mountain, ' We may still find difficulty there.' The same thought had probably brooded in other minds; still it angered me slightly to hear misgiving obtain audible expression."

"From the point on which we planted our first flagstaff a hacked and extremely acute ridge ran, and abutted against the final precipice. Along this we moved cautiously, while the face of the precipice came clearer and clearer into view. The ridge on which we stood ran right against it; it was the only means of approach, while ghastly abysses fell on either side. We sat down, and inspected the place; no glass was needed, it was so near. Three out of the four men muttered almost simultaneously, 'It is impossible.' Bennen was the only man of the four who did not utter the word. A jagged stretch of the ridge still separated us from the precipice. I pointed to a spot at some distance from the place where we sat, and asked the three doubters whether that point might not be reached without much danger. 'We think so,' was the reply. ' Then let us go there.' We reached the place, and sat down there. The men again muttered despairingly, and at length they said distinctly, 'We must give it up.' I by no means wished to put on pressure, but directing their attention to a point at the base of the precipice, I asked them whether they could not reach that point without much risk. The reply was, ' Yes.' ' Then,' I said, ' let us go there.' We moved cautiously along, and reached the point aimed at. The ridge was here split by a deep cleft which separated it from the final precipice. So savage a spot I had never seen, and I sat down upon it with the sickness of disappointed hope. The summit was within almost a stone's throw of us, and the thought of retreat was bitter in the extreme. Bennen excitedly pointed out a track which he thought practicable. He spoke of danger, of difficulty, never of impossibility; but this was the ground taken by the other three men."

== See also ==
- Timeline of climbing the Matterhorn
- List of mountains of Switzerland named after people
