= Félicité Carrel =

Italian mountaineer

Félicité Carrel was an Italian mountaineer, known for her 1867 attempt to climb Mount Matterhorn.

== Biography ==
Carrel was the daughter of Italian mountaineer Jean-Antoine Carrel. In 1867 Carrel and her father joined climbers César Carrel, Jean-Joseph, Victor and Jean-Pierre Maquignaz in an attempt to scale Mount Matterhorn. Carrel climbed to 400 feet from the summit, but was prohibited from going further by her skirts which had caught in the wind and returned with her father while the others continued on.

== Legacy ==
Carrel's 1867 climb attempt makes her the first woman to do so. The point on Mount Matterhorn that she reached is named for her: Col Félicité.
