= Livia Anne Richard =

Swiss theater director and author

- Born: Livia Anne Richard; 24 February 1969 (age 57); Bern, Switzerland
- Occupation: Playwright
- Writing career
- Language: German

Livia Anne Richard (born 24 February 1969 in Bern) is a Swiss theater director and author.

Richard has been active as a director and author of theater productions since the 1990s.

In 2002 she founded the Theater Gurten on the Bernese local mountain Gurten and has since been the director of all the productions taking place there. The piece written by Richard Dällebach Kari was premiered there in 2006 and prolongated in the following year. The piece served as the basis for the 2012 released movie Someone Like Me by Oscar winner Xavier Koller.

In 2010 Richard opened together with Markus Maria Enggist, Annemarie Morgenegg, Fredi Stettler and Hank Shizzoe in Bern's Mattequartier the theater Matte, specializing in productions in Bernese German, in which she was active until 2016 as artistic director.

In 2014 Richard was referred by the newspaper Bernerbär as the town's most influential cultural worker. In June 2018, she was endowed a cultural award with a 50,000 francs prize from the Bürgi Willert Foundation in Bern.

In 2016 she rewrote Romanian-French playwright Eugène Ionesco's showpiece of absurd theater "Rhinoceros", with music by Hank Shizzoe.

In 2017 she was inspired by the novella "Romeo und Julia auf dem Dorfe" by Gottfried Keller for her dramaturgy (William Shakespeare's Romeo and Juliet plot in a Swiss village setting), resulting in the piece Romeo und Julia am Gornergrat (Romeo and Juliet on the Gorner Ridge) in Walser German. Later a version in Bavarian dialect was produced titled "Romeo and Julia in den Bergen" (Romeo and Julia in the mountains). Unlike Shakespeare, Livia Anne Richard does not limit herself to the classic story of the two lovers, but gives room to the cause of the quarrel.

In 2026, with the play So viu Läbe, which she wrote and directed, Richard brought her 24-year career as a director at the Gurten Theatre to a close.

== Works (selection) ==
- 1999: Sternentanz (Star Dance) – world premiere: 1999
- 2006: Dällebach Kari – world premiere: 2006, Freilichttheater Gurten, Bern
- 2010: Einstein – world premiere: 27. Juli 2010, Freilichttheater Gurten, Bern
- 2014: Paradies (Paradise) – world premiere: 28. Juni 2014, Freilichttheater Gurten, Bern
- 2015: The Matterhorn Story – world premiere: 9. Juli 2015, Freilichtspiele Zermatt
- 2016: «Die Nashörner»
- 2017: Romeo und Julia am Gornergrat (Romeo and Juliet on the Gorner Ridge) – world premiere: 6. Juli 2017, Freilichtspiele Zermatt
- 2018: ABEFAHRE! - Stressfrei in 5 Tagen (DEPOSIT! - Stress-free in 5 days ) – world premiere: 20. Juni 2018, Freilichttheater Gurten, Bern
- 2026: So viu Läbe, Theater Gurten
