= Peter Taugwalder =

Swiss mountaineer (1820–1888)

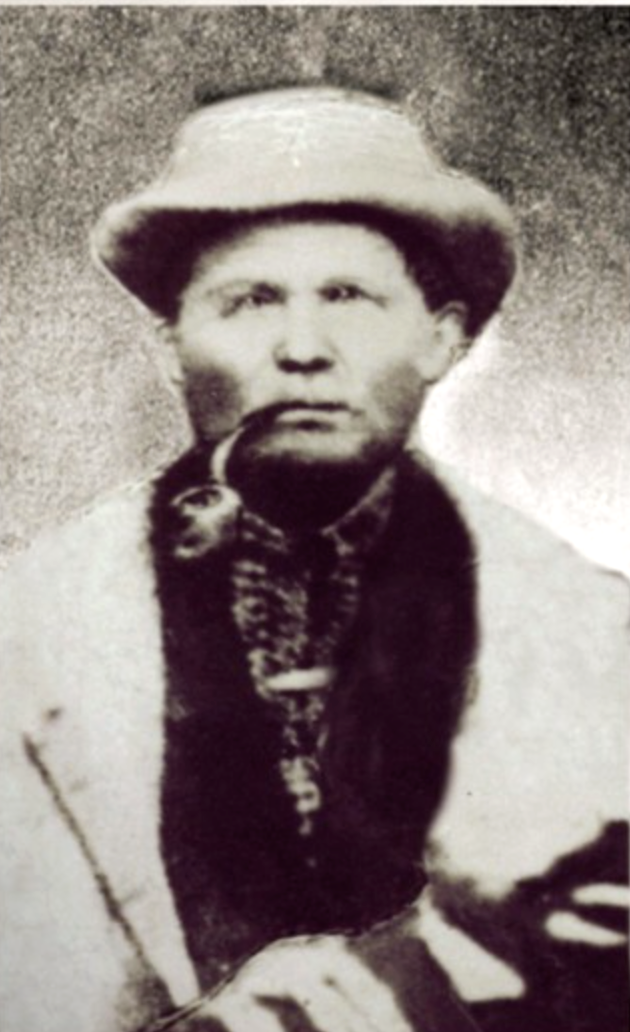
Peter Taugwalder

Peter Taugwalder (4 April 1820 – 10 July 1888) was a Swiss mountaineer and guide. Along with his son of the same name, Taugwalder was one of seven men that made the first ascent of the Matterhorn in July 1865. He was also one of the three men that survived the descent, along with his son and Edward Whymper.

A native of Zermatt, Taugwalder also made the first ascent of Pollux (1864) and the Hohberghorn (1869). Other notable climbs include the second ascent of the Dunantspitze (1851) and the Ober Gabelhorn (1865).

Following the disastrous first ascent of the Matterhorn in which four men died, Taugwalder's conduct was the subject of an investigation in which he was cleared of responsibility. Nonetheless, Taugwalder suffered from recriminations and accusations by other mountaineers. He quit his guide job a few years after the accident and emigrated to North America. He died near Schwarzsee soon after his return to Zermatt.

Taugwalder had two sons, Peter and Joseph Taugwalder. His parents were mountain farmers.
