= Piero Maquignaz =

Italian cross-country skier and military patrol runner

Piero (Pierre) Maquignaz (pron. fr. makiɲa') from Valtournenche was an Italian cross-country skier and military patrol runner, who competed in the 1920s and 1930s.

== Biography ==
Maquignaz won the 18 kilometres event of the 1926 Italian men's championships of cross-country skiing, and placed second in the following year. At the 1928 Winter Olympics in St. Moritz, he was member of the Italian military patrol team (demonstration event). In 1933, he was member of the winner team at the first Mezzalama Trophy event.
