= Douglas Robert Hadow =

British novice mountain climber

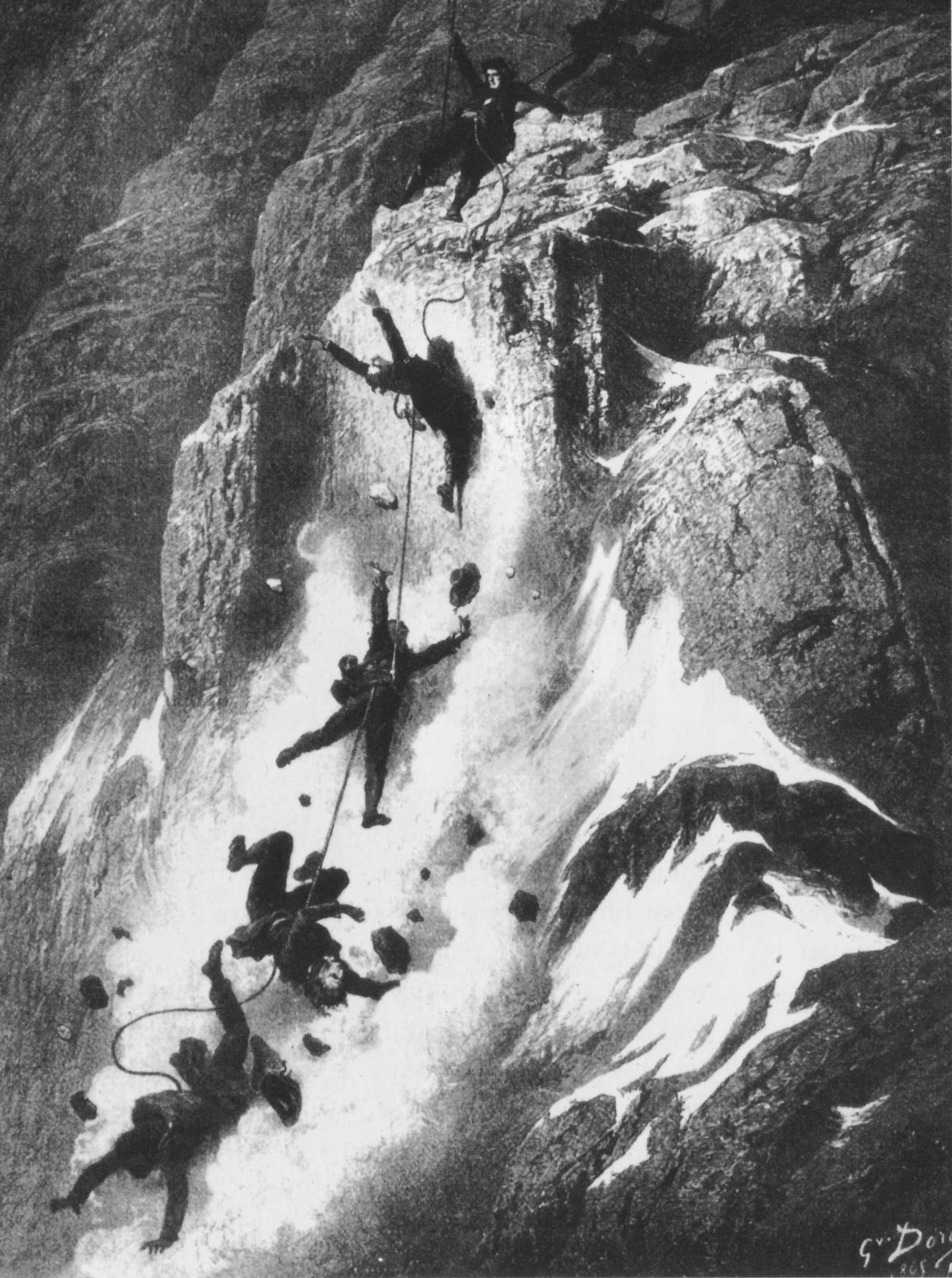
The accident on the Matterhorn, triggered by Hadow, in an engraving by Gustave Doré. Hadow is second from the bottom, with Croz below him. The snapped rope above Hudson and Douglas is clearly seen.

Douglas Robert Hadow (30 May 1846 – 14 July 1865) was a British novice mountaineer who died on the descent after the first ascent of the Matterhorn.

== Family and education ==
Hadow was born in 1846 at 49 York Terrace, Regent's Park, London, the son of Patrick Douglas Hadow (chairman of the P. & O. Steam Navigation Company) and Emma Harriett Nisbet (daughter of Robert Parry Nisbet, of Southbroom House, Devizes, Wiltshire), who married at Southbroom on 28 January 1845. Hadow's paternal great-grandfather was George Hadow, professor of Hebrew and Oriental Languages at the University of St Andrews, and one of his younger brothers was Frank Hadow, who won the Wimbledon championship in 1878.

Hadow was educated at Harrow School, where he and six of his brothers who also attended the school were known as the 'Harrow Hadows'.

== First season in the Alps ==
In 1865, at the age of nineteen, Hadow undertook his first trip to the Alps as a protégé to Charles Hudson, a clergyman from Skillington in Lincolnshire, and a leading advocate of guideless climbing. Together they made a swift ascent of Mont Blanc and other climbs; these ascents – together with the backing of a climber of Hudson's stature – persuaded Edward Whymper that Hadow was a suitable companion for an attempt on the Matterhorn.

Whymper later wrote:

Before admitting his [Hudson's] friend—Mr. Hadow—I took the precaution of asking what he had done in the Alps, and, as well as I remember, Mr. Hudson's reply was, "Mr. Hadow has done Mont Blanc in less time than most men." He then mentioned several other expeditions that were unknown to me, and added, in answer to a further question, "I consider he is a sufficiently good man to go with us."

—

In 'A Modern View of the 1865 Accident', the Alpine Club president Capt. J. P. Farrar (1917–19) concurred with this positive estimation of Hadow's ability:

Hadow was one of those active young Englishmen capable, with experienced companions, of going anywhere. I say distinctly that Hudson and Croz were fully qualified to conduct him on the proposed expedition, and that the sum of the powers of the party was much above the average of half the parties that go mountain-climbing today.

—

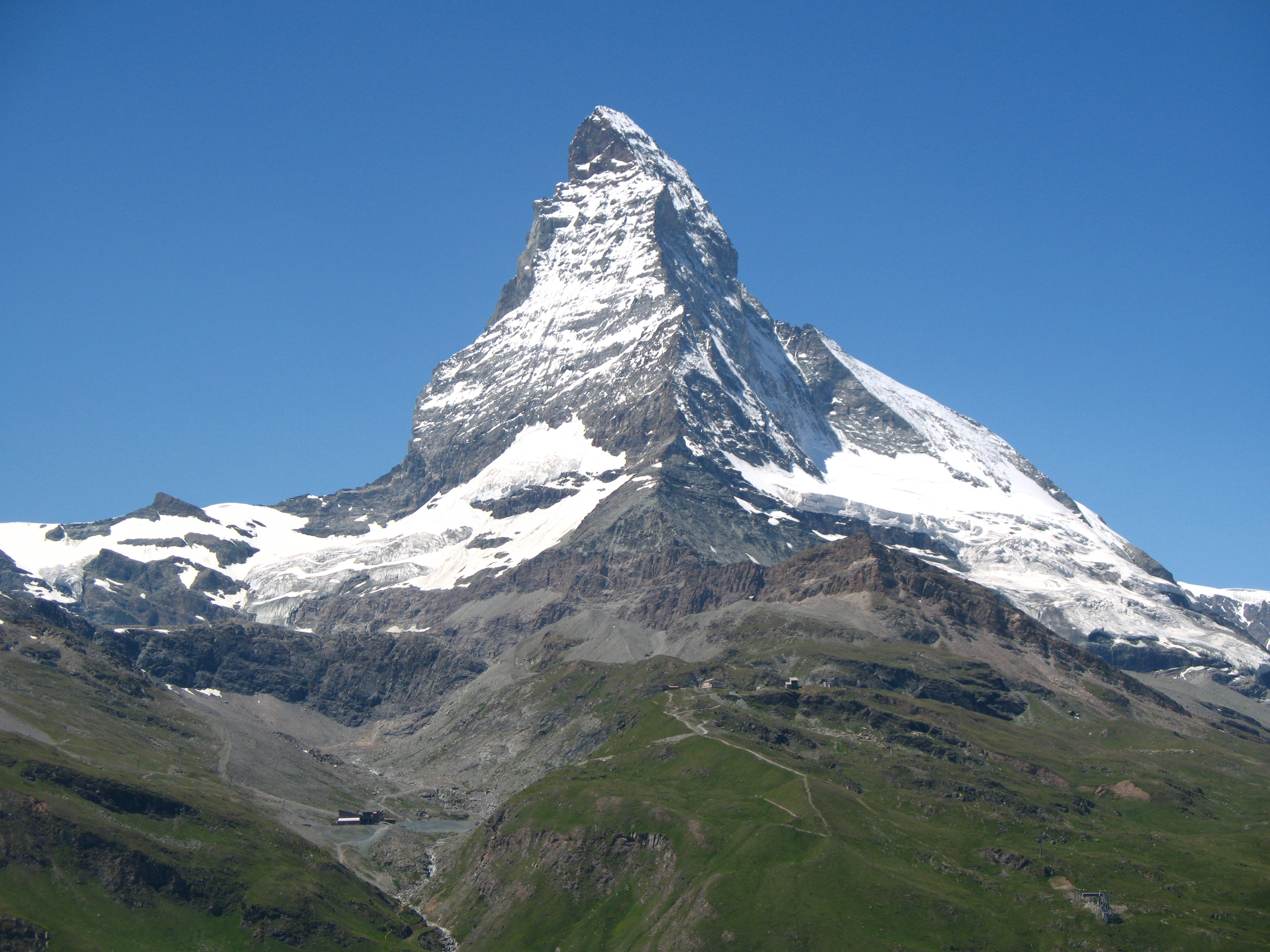
The Matterhorn. The fatal accident occurred on the sunny snow slopes at the top right of the mountain.

== Matterhorn accident ==
During the first ascent of the Matterhorn on 14 July 1865, Hadow was, however, challenged by the technical difficulties presented by the mountain. Whymper noticed his inexperience after the party had traversed onto what he termed the 'north-west face' whilst ascending the mountain. In a piece published by The Times shortly after the accident, he wrote:

The general slope of the mountain at this part was less than forty degrees, and snow had consequently accumulated and filled up the irregularities of the rock face, leaving only occasional fragments projecting here and there. These were at times coated with a thin glaze of ice, from the snow above having melted and frozen again during the night. Still it was a place which any fair mountaineer might pass in safety. We found, however, that Mr. Hadow was not accustomed to this kind of work, and required continual assistance; but no one suggested that he should stop, and he was taken to the top. It is only fair to say that the difficulty experienced by Mr. Hadow at this part arose, not from fatigue and lack of courage, but simply and entirely from want of experience.

—

Hadow's slip on the descent of the mountain was the immediate cause of the accident. He was the second on the rope as the party went down and he slipped not far from the summit, dragging three members of the party (Lord Francis Douglas, Michel Croz and Charles Hudson) with him down the north face of the mountain to their deaths. The other three members of the party – Whymper and Swiss guides Peter Taugwalder and his son of the same name – were saved when the rope between them and Douglas snapped. Claire Engel commented:

When the tragedy occurred, Whymper did not see it: he was behind a rock. His surmises are probably correct, but they are only surmises. From the beginning of the descent, Hadow was showing signs of exhaustion. The boy was certainly at the end of his endurance. With Hudson a few days earlier he had done Mont Blanc in record time, and was probably still feeling the strain. Then, the Matterhorn had been another long ordeal. His shoes were worn out and made him slip constantly. At each step Croz had to make Hadow's feet secure, and to do so he had to lay down his ice axe so that he had no support himself. Suddenly, while Croz was turning round to continue the descent, after having made Hadow secure, Hadow slipped and both of his feet struck Croz in the back. The guide lost his footing and fell headlong down the steep slope, dragging the boy with him. Hudson came next, then Douglas; none had time to react ...

—

Hadow's body was recovered from the Matterhorn Glacier and he was buried at the churchyard in Zermatt. One of Hadow's shoes can be seen in Zermatt's Matterhorn Museum, together with the snapped rope and other relics of the climb.
