= Felice Giordano =

Italian engineer and geologist

Felice Giordano (6 January 1825 – 16 July 1892) was an Italian engineer and geologist.

Giordano was born in Turin. He had an important role in the organisation of a geological service in the Kingdom of Italy and in the foundation of the Italian Geological Society. In 1863, together with Quintino Sella and Bartolomeo Gastaldi, he founded the Italian Alpine Club. He was also involved in the first ascent of the Matterhorn and he was portrayed in several related films such as The Mountain Calls and The Challenge.

He died in Vallombrosa in 1892.

== Bibliography ==
- The earth sciences in the scientific letters of Giovanni Capellini
- Felice GIORDANO (1825-1892) (French)
