= Jean-Antoine Carrel =

Italian mountain climber and guide

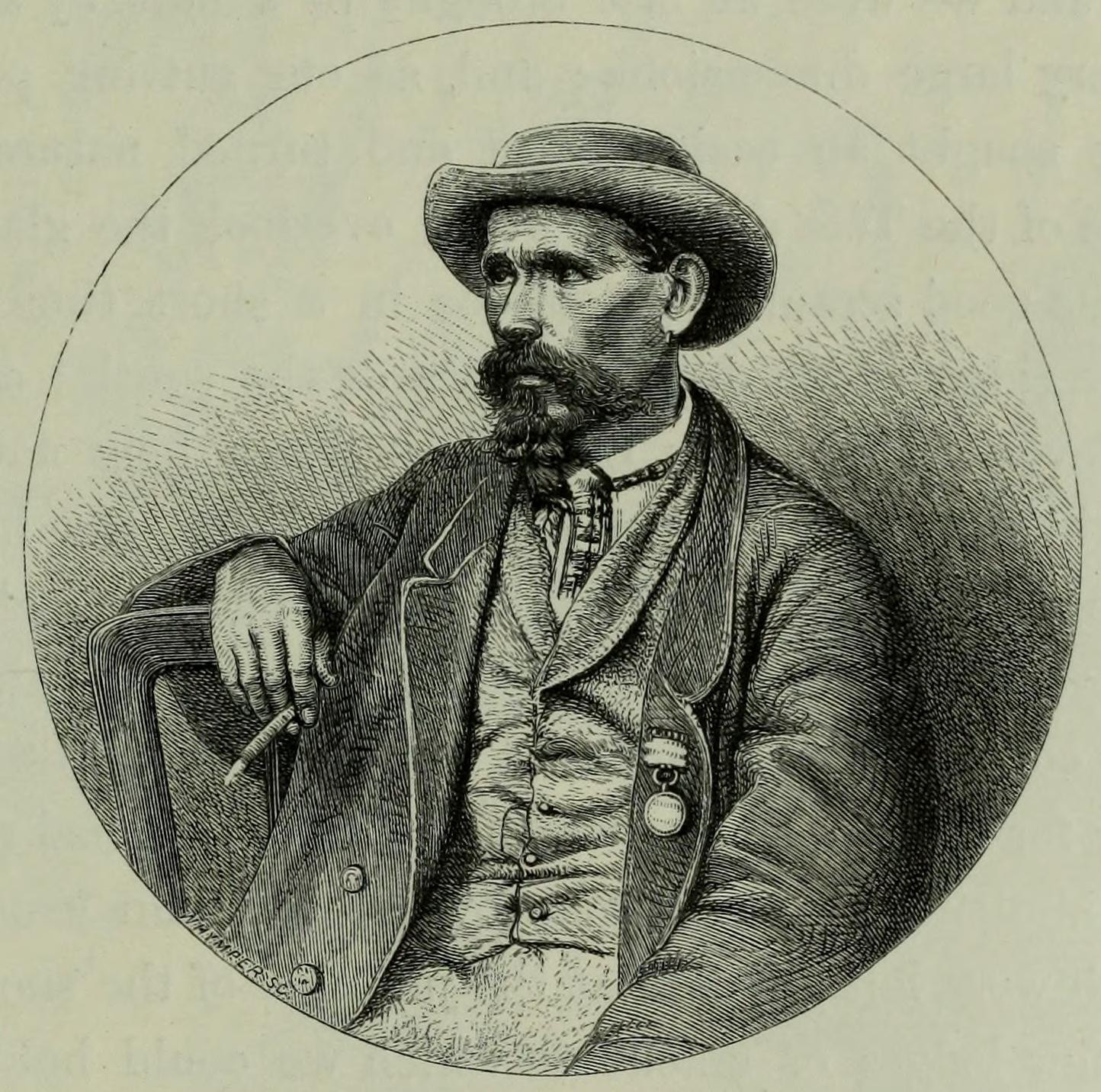
Carrel, as depicted in Edward Whymper's memoir Scrambles Amongst the Alps

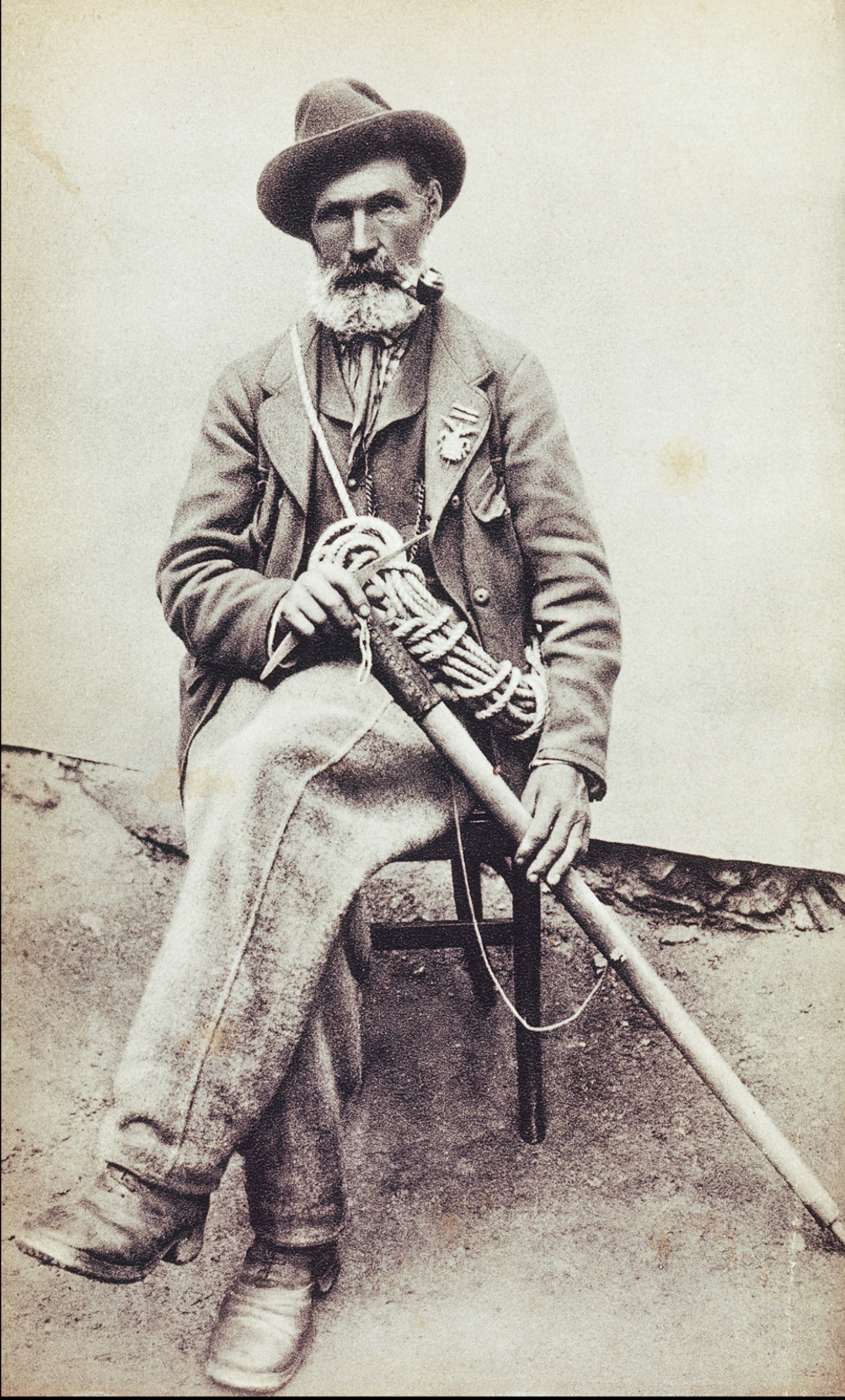
Jean-Antoine Carrel

Jean-Antoine Carrel (1829 – August 1890) was an Italian mountain climber and guide. He had made climbs with Edward Whymper and was his rival when he attempted to climb the Matterhorn for the first time. Whymper ultimately succeeded in making the mountain's first ascent in July 1865 while Carrel led the party that achieved the second ascent three days later. Carrel was in the group that became the first Europeans to reach the summit of Chimborazo in 1880. He died from exhaustion when guiding a party on the south side of the Matterhorn.

== Early life ==
Carrel was born on 16 January 1829 in Valtournenche, in the Aosta Valley, an Arpitan-speaking village of Kingdom of Sardinia (now Italy) which lies at the foot of the Matterhorn. He served in the Bersaglieri, a light infantry unit of the Piedmontese army. He resigned from the Bersaglieri to work as a hunter and mountain guide, but was recalled to duty in 1859 to defend Italy against Austria in the Second Italian War of Independence, for which he won a French medal for the Italian campaign.

== Ascent of the Matterhorn ==
Carrel first attempted to climb the Matterhorn's Lion Ridge in 1857—by which time the mountain was the tallest unclimbed peak in the Alps—with his uncle and Amé Gorret. In the early 1860s, Carrel made numerous attempts to climb the Matterhorn, often in the same party as Edward Whymper and John Tyndall, and at other times competing against them to reach the summit first. Carrel had agreed to accompany Whymper on his ascent of the Swiss side in 1865, but withdrew at the last minute when he was recruited by Felice Giordano on behalf of the Italian Alpine Club to lead an Italian party up the Italian side at the same time. Ultimately, Whymper's party outclimbed the Italians and reached the summit on 14 July 1865, marking the first ascent of the Matterhorn. Carrel and his Italian party successfully summited the Matterhorn three days later.

In September 1867, Carrel and his daughter Félicité Carrel were among a party attempting to climb the Matterhorn, but most turned back before the summit. Félicité Carrel is the first known woman to attempt to climb the Matterhorn.

== Death ==
Carrel died in the night from the 25th to the 26th of August 1890 while guiding a party during a descent in bad weather on the south side of the Matterhorn. After ensuring that his clients descended the mountain safely and easily in a severe storm, he collapsed from exhaustion and died on a rock at the mountain's base.

After Carrel's death, Whymper wrote that Carrel was "a man who was possessed with a pure and genuine love of mountains; a man of originality and resource, courage and determination, who delighted in exploration ... The manner of his death strikes a chord in hearts he never knew."
