= Valtournenche =

Valtournenche Vótornéntse (Valdôtain)
- Comune
- Comune di Valtournenche; Commune de Valtournenche
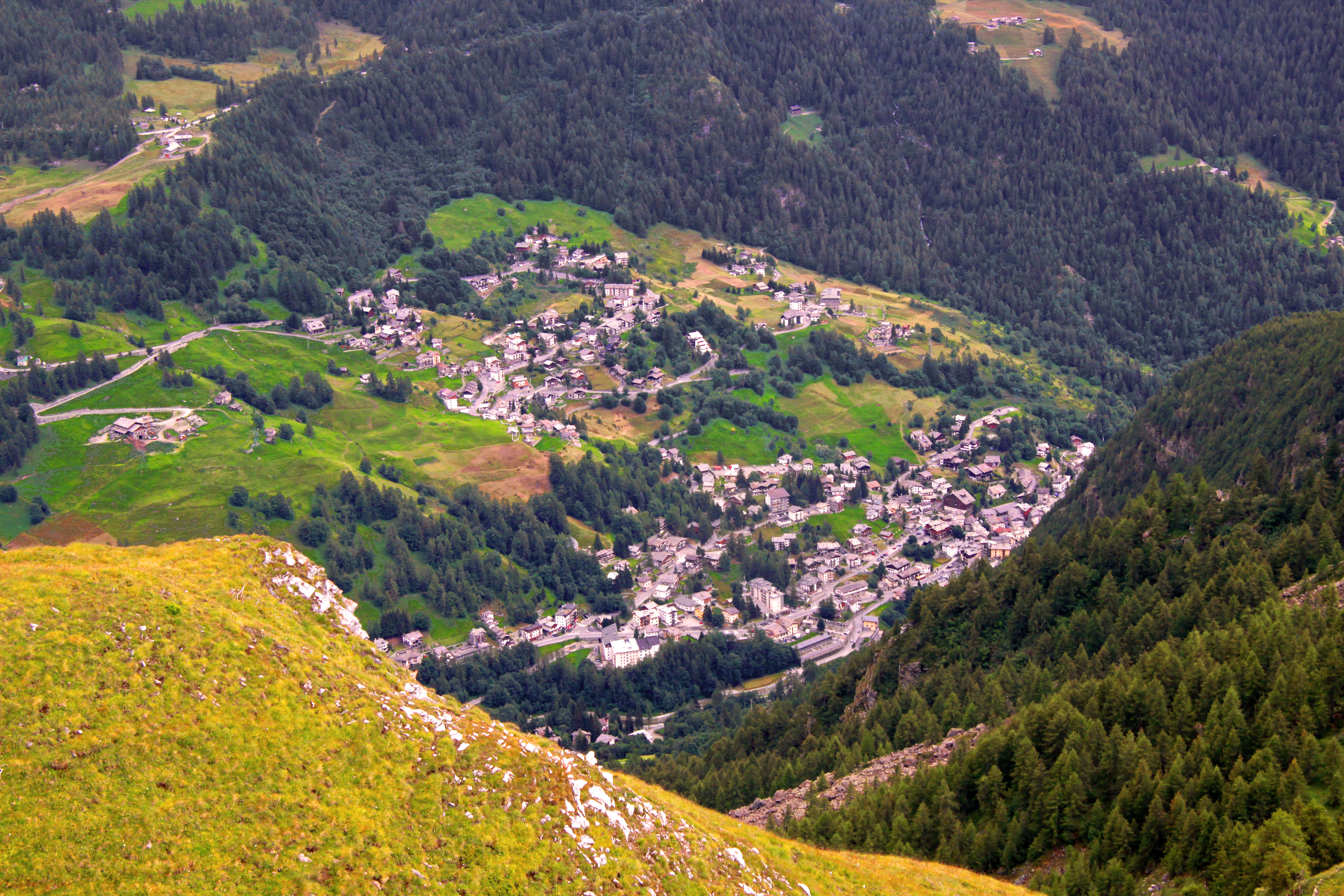

- Coat of arms

- Location within Italy Location within Aosta Valley
- Coordinates: 45°53′N 07°37′E
- Country: Italy
- Region: Aosta Valley
- Province: none
- Frazioni: Les Arsines, Avouil, La Barmasse, Les Battendières, Le Bioley, La Brengaz, Le Breuil, Chaloz, Champcartanaz, Champlève, Les Châtelards, Cheneil, Cheperon, Les Clous, Crépin, Le Crêt, Crétaz, Le Crêt-des-Perrères, Le Crou-Dessous, Le Crou-Dessus, Duerche, L'Évette, Facebellaz, La Fontanaz, Le Glair, La Glarénaz, Le Gouffre-des-Busserailles, Le Lac-Bleu, Les Laviels, Losanche, Le Loz, Maën, La Maisonnasse, La Montat, Le Mont-Mené, Le Mont-Perron, Le Moulin, La Murenche, Pâquier (chef-lieu), Pecou, Les Perrères, Pessey, Les Ponteils, Les Prés, Promindot, Les Saix, La Servaz, Singlin, Tourtourouse, Ussin, Valmartin, La Venal

Area
  - Total: 115 km^{2} (44 sq mi)
- Elevation: 1,528 m (5,013 ft)

Population (31 December 2022)
  - Total: 2,178
  - Density: 18.9/km^{2} (49.1/sq mi)
- Demonym: Valtournains
- Time zone: UTC+1 (CET)
  - Summer (DST): UTC+2 (CEST)
- Postal code: 11028
- Dialing code: 0166
- Website: http://www.comune.valtournenche.ao.it

Valtournenche (French: [valtuʁnɑ̃ʃ]; Valdôtain: Vótornéntse) is a town and comune in the Aosta Valley region of north-western Italy, 1,500 m (4,900 ft) above the sea level. It is named after and covers the upper side of the Valtournenche, a valley on the left side of the Dora Baltea, from Châtillon to the Matterhorn. Valtournenche municipality includes Breuil-Cervinia, whose ski resort is linked to Zermatt, Switzerland.

== Notable people ==
- Jean-Antoine Carrel (1829–1890), mountain climber
- Jean-Joseph Maquignaz (1829–1890), mountain climber
- Georges Carrel (1800–1870), canon, mountain climber and botanist
- Luigi Carrel (1901–1983), mountain climber
- Piero Maquignaz, skier and mountain climber
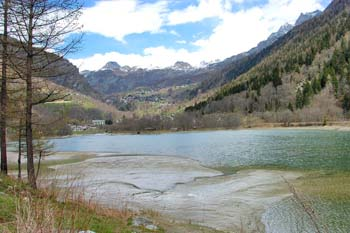
The Maën lake.

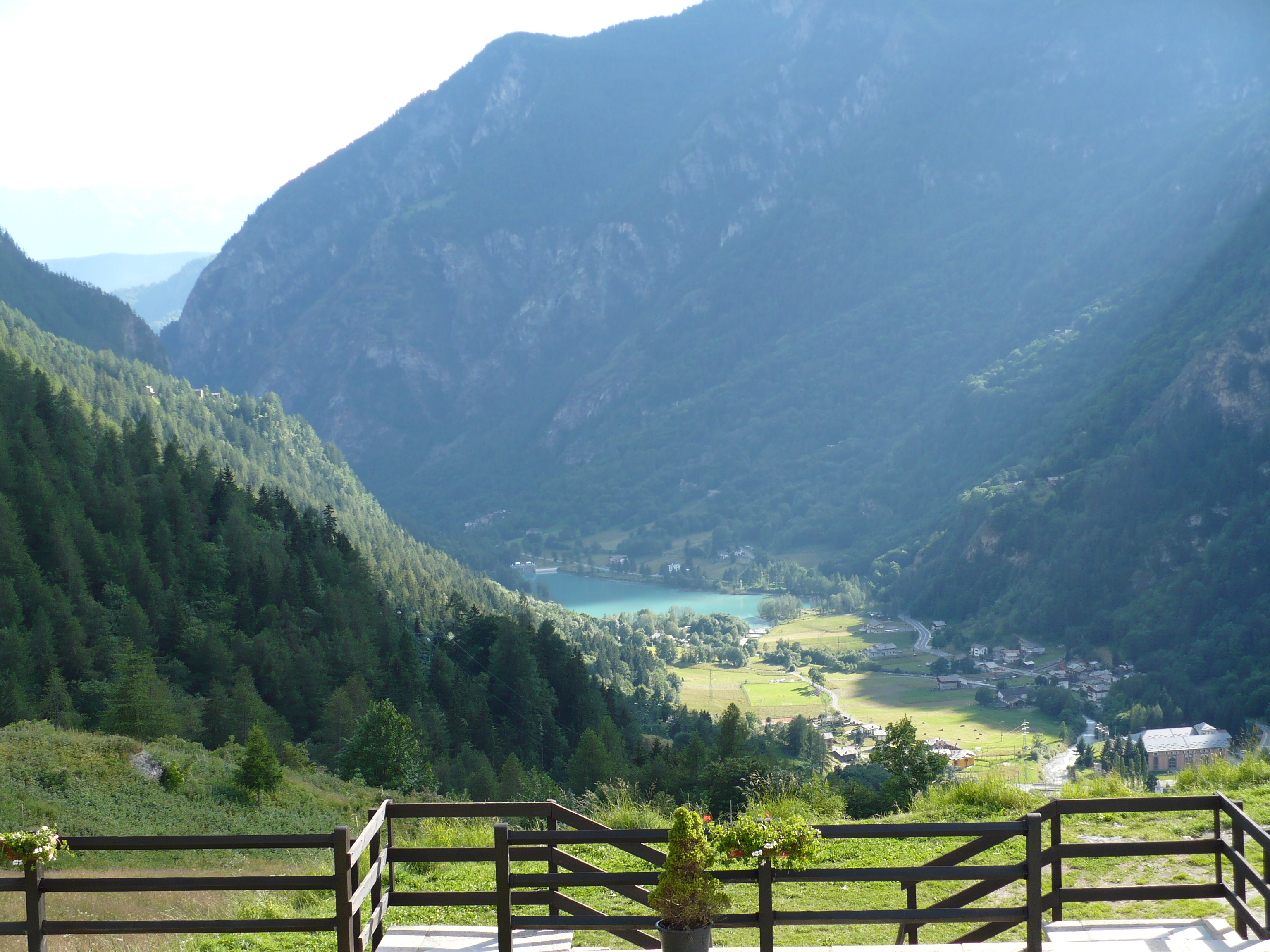
Maën lake seen from Pâquier.
