= Wilderness hut =

Simple shelter or hut for temporary accommodation

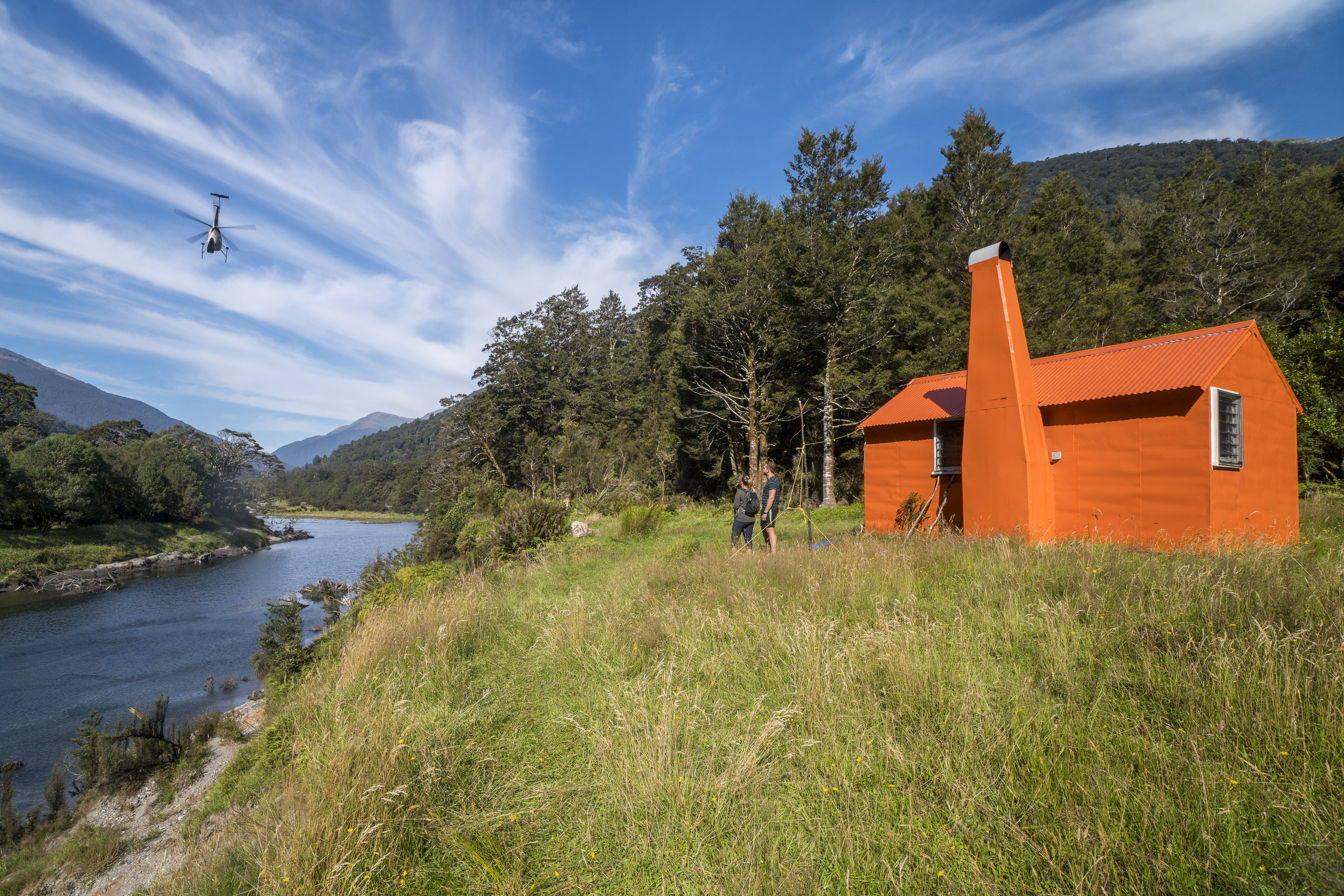
Back country hut in the Haast River valley of the West Coast region of New Zealand

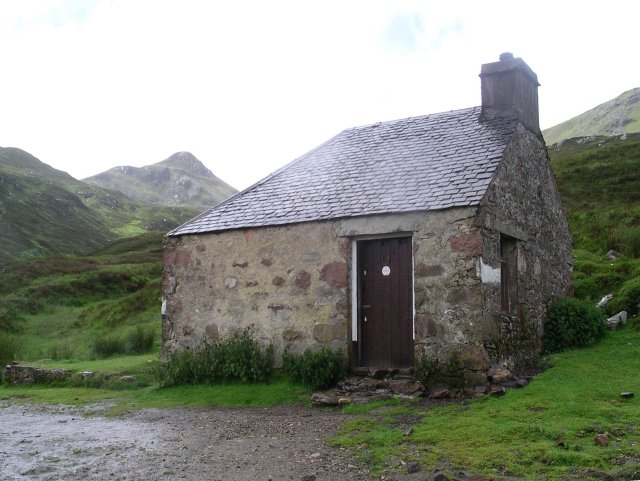
Lairig Leacach Bothy, Lochaber, Scotland

A wilderness hut, bothy, backcountry hut, or backcountry shelter is a free, primitive mountain hut for temporary accommodation, usually located in wilderness areas, national parks and along backpacking and hiking routes. They are found in many parts of the world, such as Finland, Sweden, Norway, northern Russia, the Alps, the Pyrenees, Scotland, Australia, New Zealand, Canada, and the United States. Huts are basic and often unmanned, some without running water.

== Bothy ==
A bothy is a basic shelter, usually left unlocked and available for anyone to use free of charge. They are found in remote mountainous areas of Scotland, Northern England, Northern Ireland, Wales and the Isle of Man. Most are ruined buildings which have been restored to a basic standard, providing a windproof and watertight shelter. They vary in size from little more than a large box up to two-storey cottages. They usually have designated sleeping areas, which commonly are either an upstairs room or a raised platform, thus allowing one to keep clear of cold air and draughts at floor height. No bedding, mattresses or blankets are provided. Public access to bothies is either on foot, by bicycle or boat. Most bothies have a fireplace and are near a natural source of water. A spade may be provided to bury excrement.

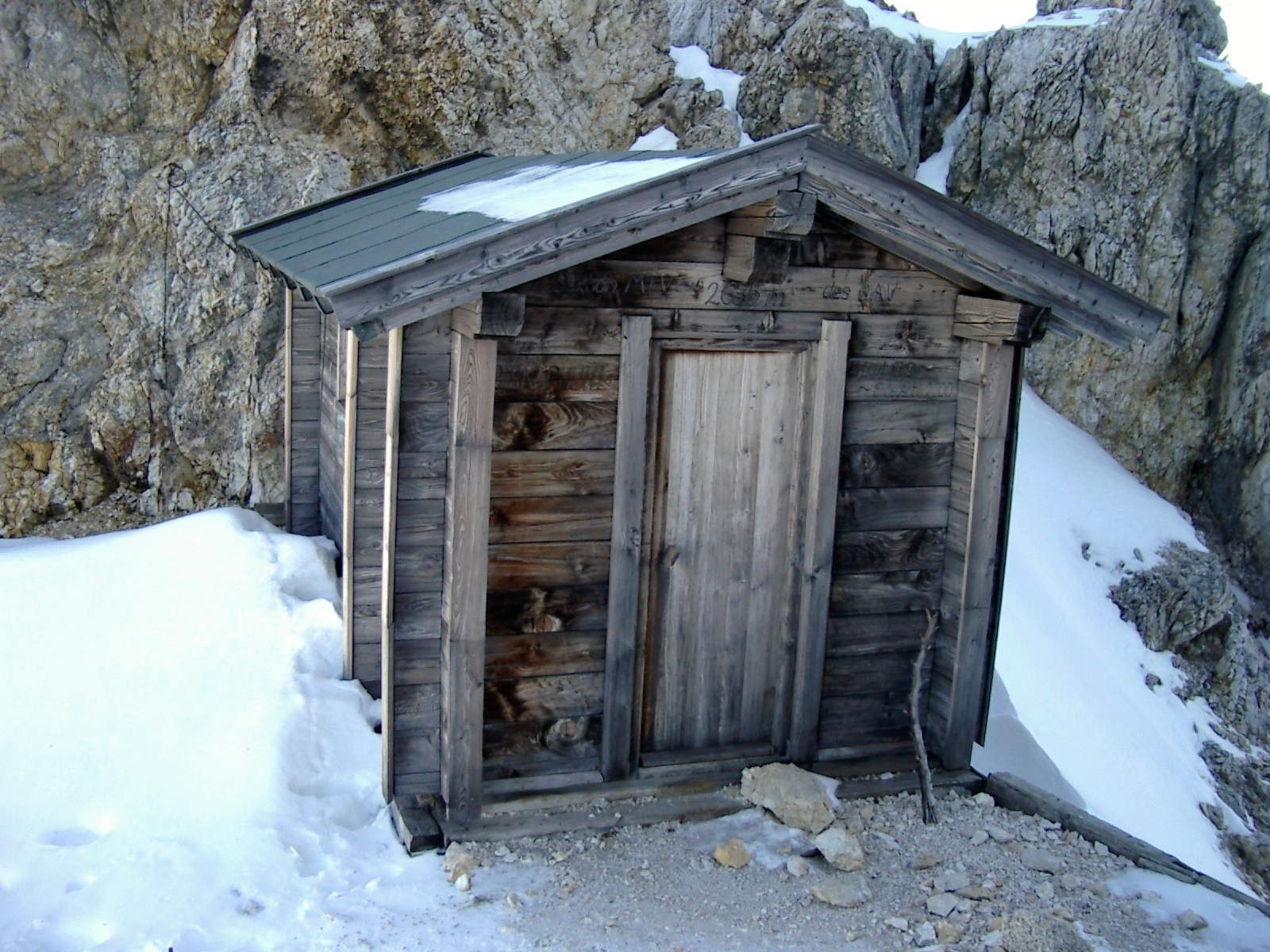
Biwakschachtel, or bivouac box. The Birkkarhütte at 2635m near the Birkkarspitze (2,749 metres), the highest peak in the Karwendel Mountains, Austrian Tyrol

== Biwakschachteln ==
Shelters, known in German as Biwakschachtel, or bivouac box, can also be found in remote areas of the Alps. Even though Biwakschachteln are also tended to by Alpine Clubs, they differ markedly from other mountain huts, because they do not have a permanent resident who tends to the building and provides food and refreshments. There are eight Alpine countries (from west to east): France, Switzerland, Monaco, Italy, Liechtenstein, Austria, Germany, and Slovenia.

The Solvay Hut or Solvay Bivouac (Hörnli Ridge) of the Matterhorn, near Zermatt, Switzerland. At 4,003 metres (13,133 ft) it is the highest mountain hut owned by the Swiss Alpine Club, but can be used only in case of emergency.

== Adirondack lean-to ==
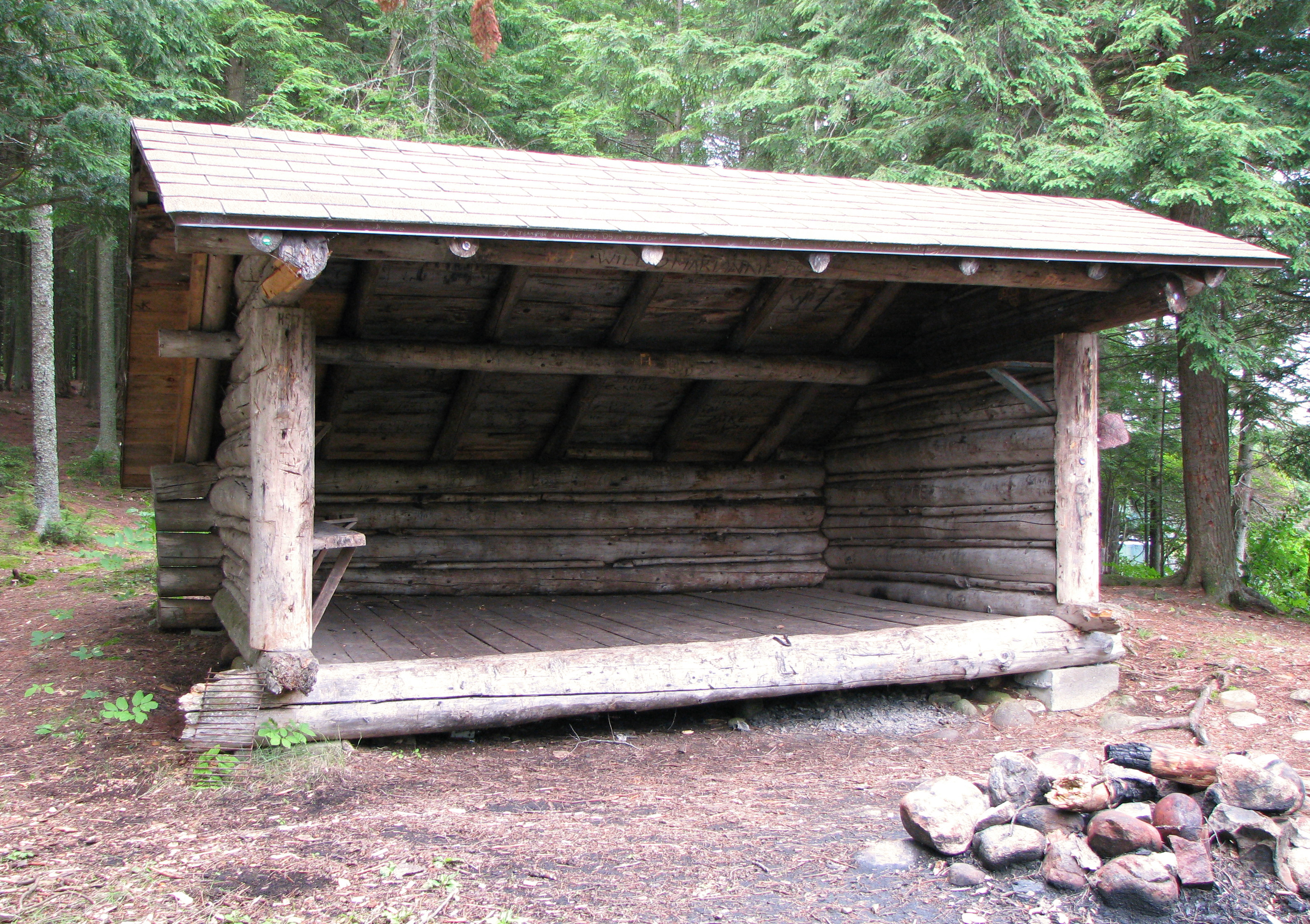
A lean-to at Black Pond, Keese Mill, New York

An Adirondack lean-to or Adirondack shelter is a three sided log structure popularized in the Adirondack Mountains of Upstate New York. Lean-to structures offer shelter for campers. Since their development in the Adirondacks, this type of shelter has seen use in a number of parks throughout the United States, such as Isle Royale National Park in Michigan and Indian Cave State Park in Nebraska. The Adirondack lean-to was developed by guides of the region as convenient campsite to house hunting and fishing parties. The earliest of these shelters were quickly and crudely built but they still offered shelter from the elements.

As the Adirondacks developed, so did the lean-to structures. The previous temporary structures were replaced by sturdy log structures. Made from what was available, balsam or spruce logs were commonly used. Cedar has replaced these species as the primary log, due to its natural rot resistance and easy workability. Some High Peaks lean-tos do not have fire rings in front of them.

== Boofen ==
An even simpler shelter is found in the Elbe Sandstone Mountains of German-speaking Saxon Switzerland where climbers refer to overnighting in the open air as Boofen (pronounced "bo-fen"). The spot selected for overnight stays usually comprises an overhang in the sandstone rock or a cave, the so-called Boofe ("bo-fe"). This has often been adapted with a sleeping area and fireplace. In the national park itself, Boofen is only permitted at designated sites and only in connection with climbing, although in this case lighting fires is absolutely forbidden. The colloquial Saxon word boofen was derived from pofen (= sleep soundly and for a long time).

== Huts by country ==
=== Finland ===
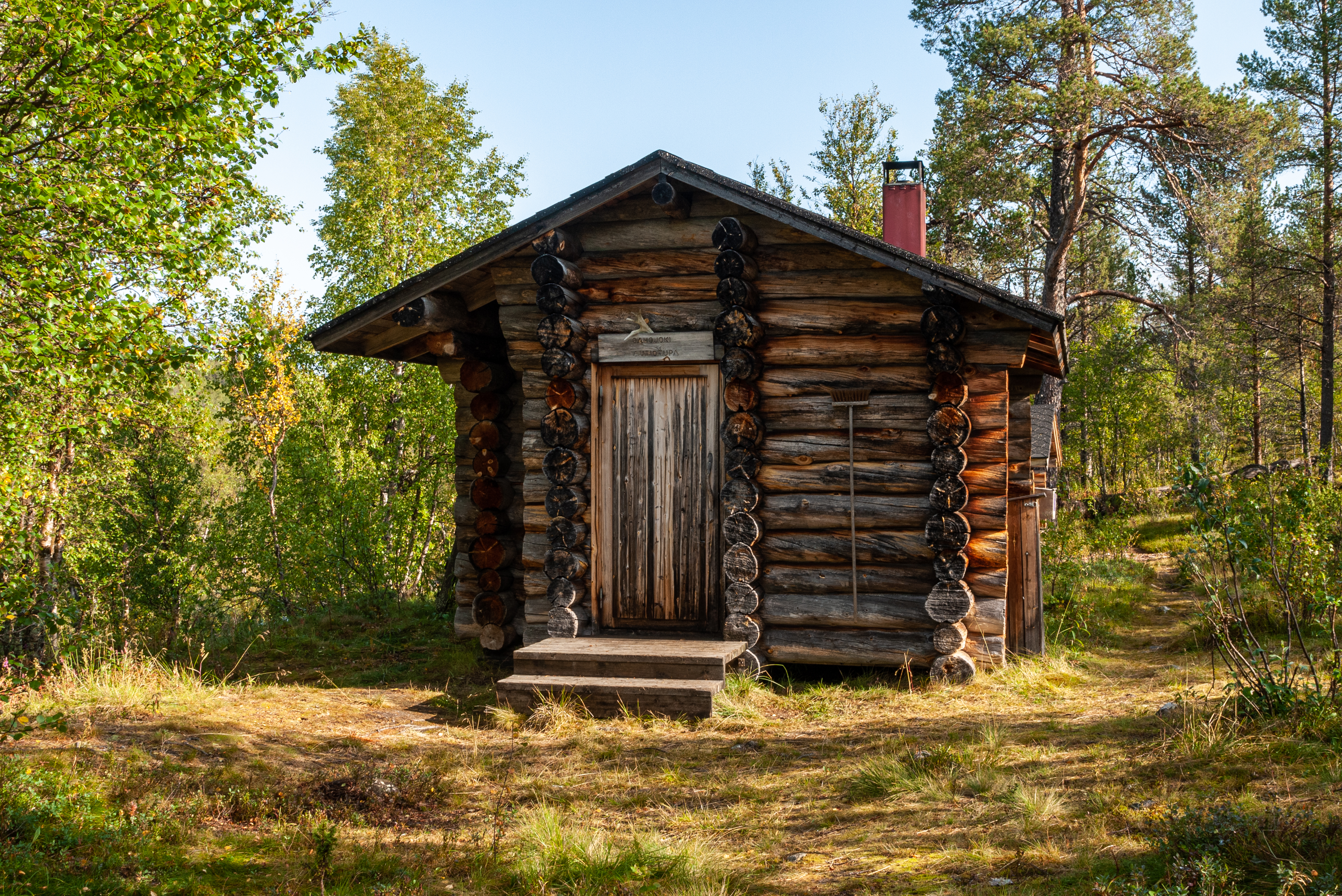
The Oahujoki wilderness hut in Lemmenjoki National Park, Finland, can accommodate seven people overnight.

Official wilderness huts are mostly maintained by Metsähallitus (Finnish for Administration of Forests), the Finnish state-owned forest management company. Most of the wilderness huts in Finland are situated in the northern and eastern parts of the country. Their size can vary greatly: the Lahtinen cottage in the Muotkatunturi Wilderness Area can barely hold two people, whereas the Luirojärvi cottage in the Urho Kekkonen National Park can hold as many as 16.

A wilderness hut need not be reserved beforehand, and they are open for everyone tracking by foot, ski or similar means. Commercial stays overnight are prohibited in the wilderness huts owned by Metsähallitus. Unofficial and unmaintained huts also exist.

For centuries the vast wildernesses of Finland and its resources were divided amongst the Finnish agricultural societies (such as families, villages, parishes, and provinces) for the purpose of collecting resources. Areas divided in this way were called erämaa, literally "portion-land," (now literally the word for "wilderness" in modern Finnish). People from agricultural societies made trips to their erämaas in the summer, mainly to trap animals for fur but also to hunt game, fish, and collect taxes from the local hunter-fisher population.

Huts were built in the wilderness for use as base camps for hunters and fishermen. Also non-agricultural Sami people built huts to help them manage reindeer. The earliest huts were only allowed to be used by people from the communities that owned them. Outsiders were not allowed to use the resources of other communities' erämaas.

Huts that were free for everyone were first seen in late 18th century Finland, when dwelling places were built along walking routes for passers-by. In the 19th century the authorities started building these huts. Later in the 20th century they started to be built for travellers.

=== New Zealand ===
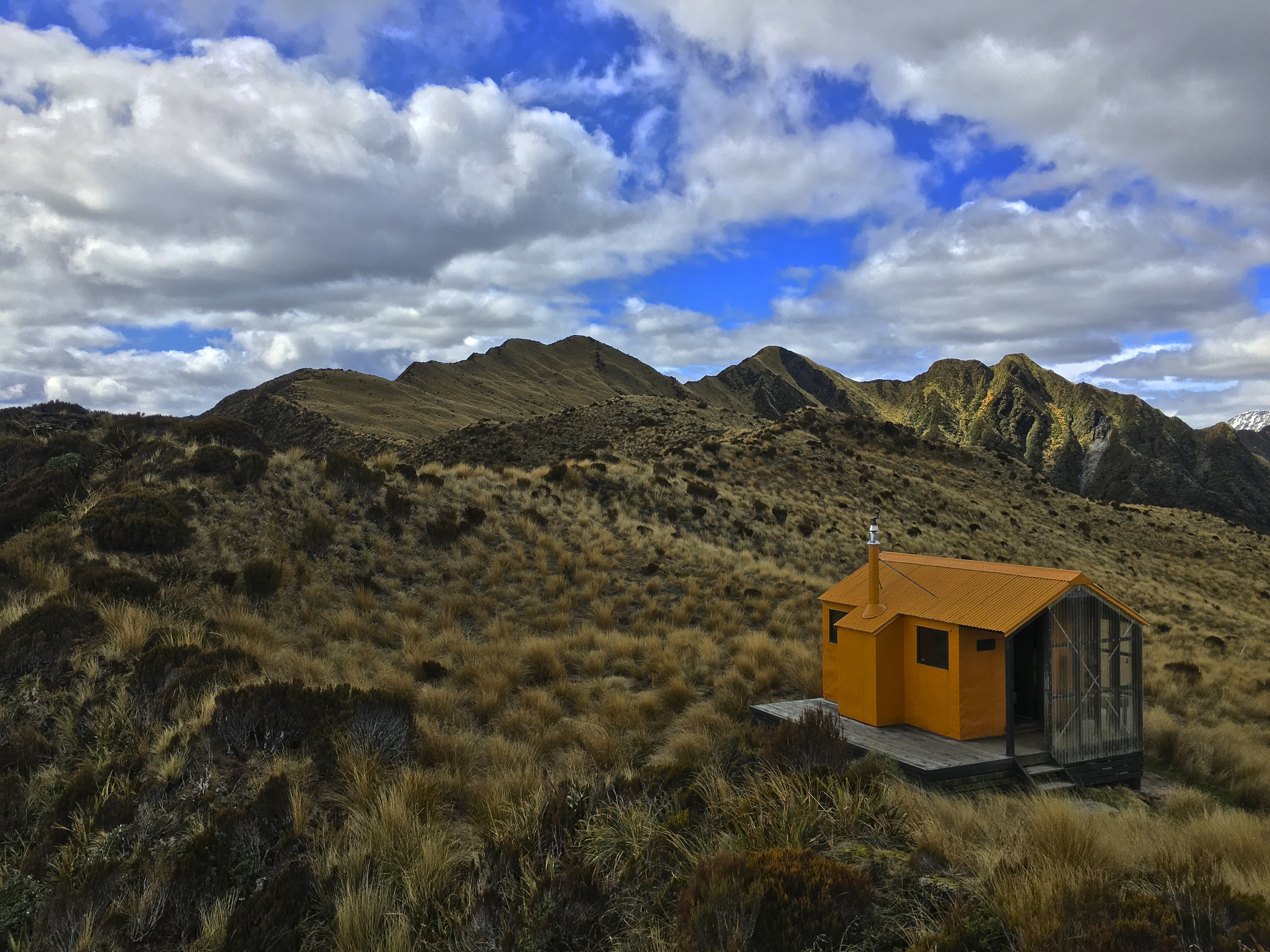
Mt Brown Hut at the Lake Kaniere Scenic Reserve in the West Coast, New Zealand

New Zealand has a network of approximately 950 backcountry huts. The huts are officially maintained by the Department of Conservation (DOC), although some of the huts have been adopted and maintained by local hiking and hunting clubs by arrangement. There are also unofficial and privately owned huts in some places. They vary from small bivouac shelters made of wood to large modern huts that can sleep up to 40 people, with separate cooking areas, utilities and gas.

Some huts were initially commissioned or built by clubs along commonly walked routes, both for safety reasons as appropriate, and sometimes for convenience. The network of back-country huts in New Zealand was largely extended in the mid-20th-century, when many more were built to serve the deer cullers of the New Zealand Forest Service. Most larger and more modern huts, like some found on the Great Walks, have been purpose designed and built to serve trampers. Many of New Zealand's back-country huts are remote and rarely visited, and it is common for recreational trampers to design trips with the idea of reaching and visiting specific huts. Some people actively keep count of which huts they have visited, a practice which is informally referred to as hut bagging.

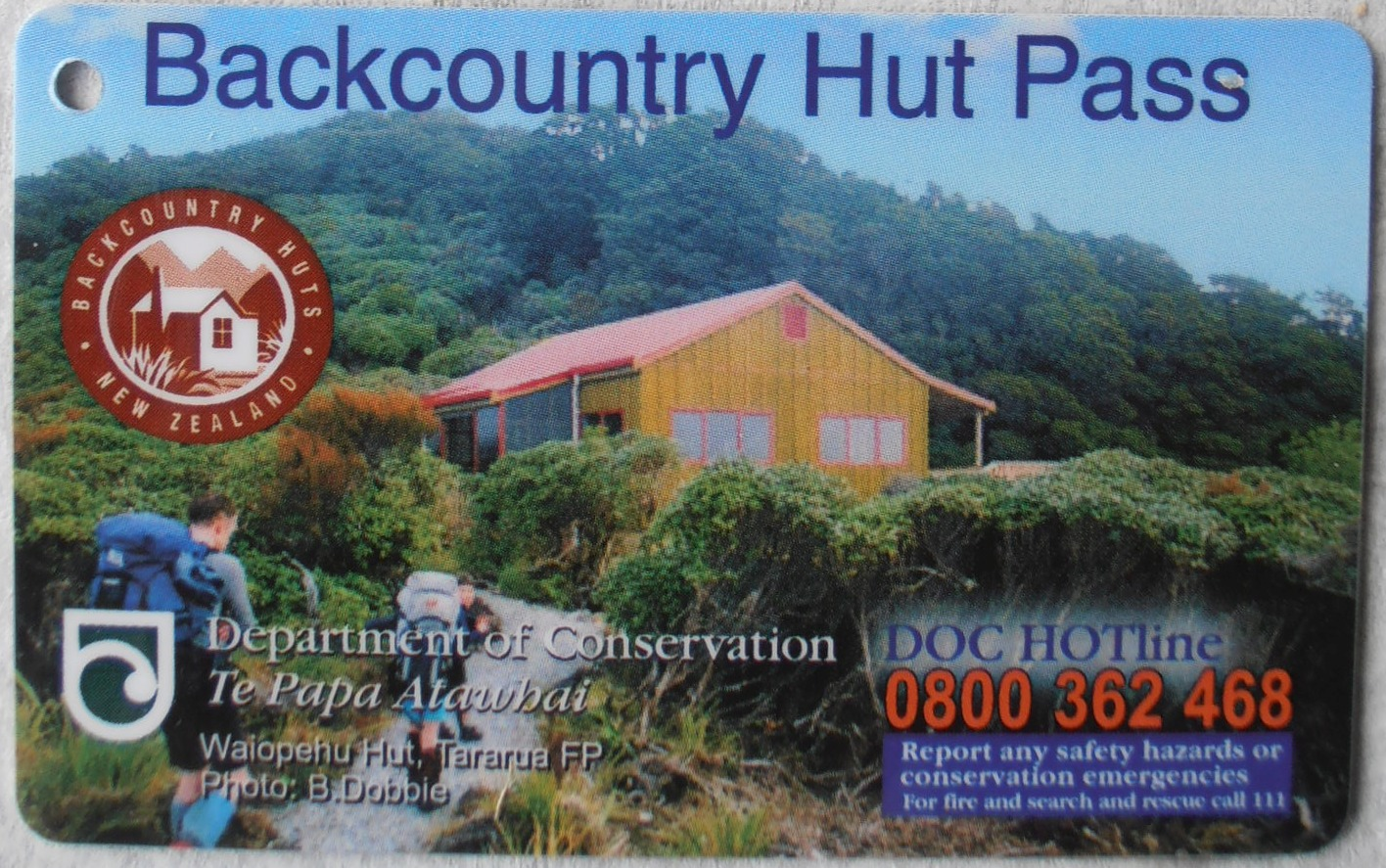
New Zealand backcountry hut pass

Back-country huts in New Zealand were free to use until the early 1990s, when the New Zealand Department of Conservation began charging for their use. For most back-country huts, nightly hut tickets are purchased via an honesty system by people who use the huts, with an additional option of purchasing an annual pass for people who use huts frequently. Huts on frequently used and heavily marketed tracks, such as the New Zealand Great Walks, usually operate on a booking system, and often have resident wardens checking the bookings of users who arrive to stay the night.

Since the inception of hut fees in New Zealand, there has been controversy amongst some hut users. Many users belong to clubs which helped to build and maintain the huts before the government department was created, and consequently inherited them. It is common to find people who refuse to pay for the use of huts in protest, arguing that the government is trying to charge them to use facilities that they themselves are entirely responsible for providing. DOC argues that all hut fees are used for the continued maintenance of huts, and for building new huts as appropriate. It has at times made efforts to demonstrate this by specifically allocating money from hut fees towards budgets for these purposes.

The majority of the huts were built in an era of lower levels of government regulation and the long term use of the huts was not considered. As a result of the Cave Creek disaster in 1995, DOC tightened up on the standards for structures on public land. Some of the huts were upgraded to meet build regulations whilst others were removed or had certain facilities (such as beds) removed to cause them to fall into less strict building categories. In 2008, because of the recognition of the unique situation and the remote locations, the government relaxed the building standards for the huts. They now no longer need to have emergency lighting, smoke alarms, wheelchair access, potable water supplies or artificial lighting.

=== Australia ===
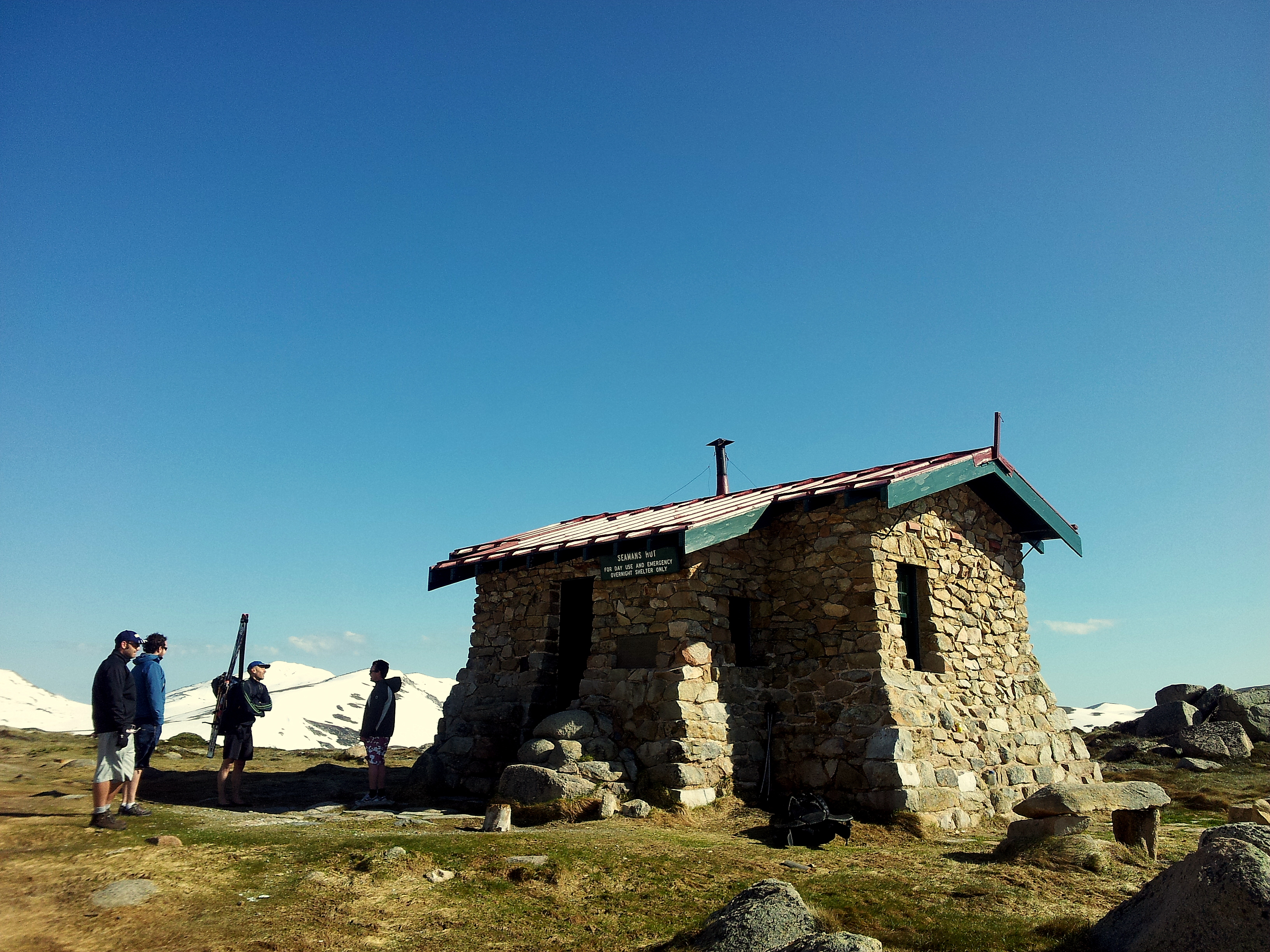
Seaman's Hut, New South Wales, Australia

Seaman's Hut is a memorial hut located on the road to Mount Kosciuszko, Etheridge Range, New South Wales. It was built following the death of two skiers, W. Laurie Seaman and Evan Hayes in 1928. Seaman's family built the hut to provide shelter to future users of the park, in order to prevent recurrence of a similar tragedy. Seaman's hut is constructed from rock and has two rooms and a foyer for firewood storage. The floor is plank flooring. This hut is intended for emergency shelter overnight and for day use. It is well-stocked with firewood and also holds emergency supplies of dried food. The food supplies are stocked by goodwill of hikers and are not maintained officially by the National Parks.

The site on Etheridge Range was chosen by W. H. Seaman, to build a shelter in memory of his son Laurie Seaman, who died of exposure in 1928 at the same location.

=== United States ===
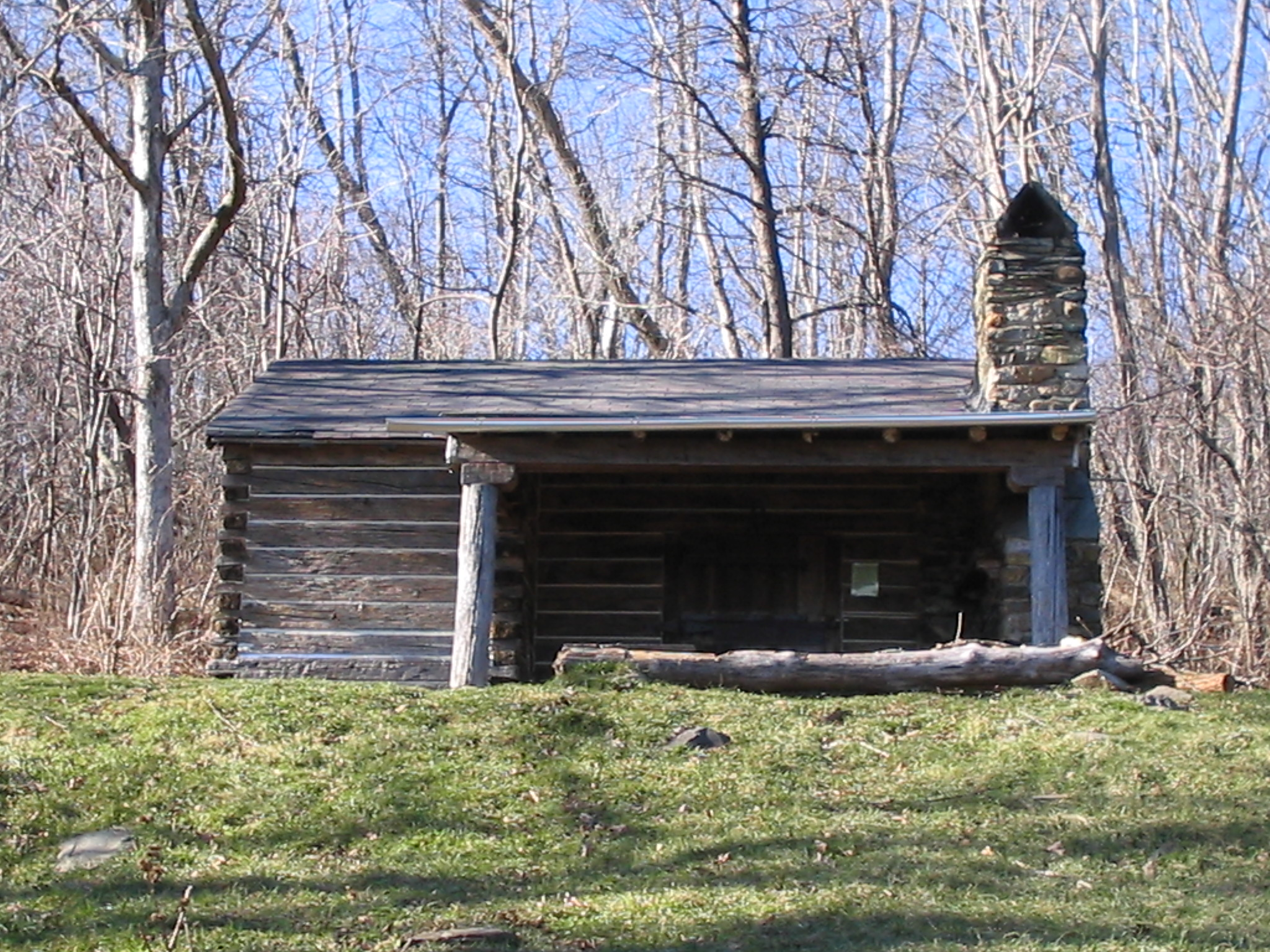
The Pocosin cabin along the Appalachian Trail in Shenandoah National Park

In the United States, backcountry huts may be provided by the Forest Service, state or national parks such as the Great Smoky Mountains National Park. Wilderness huts are frequently located along hiking routes.

The Tenth Mountain Huts is a system of 29 backcountry huts in the Colorado Rocky Mountains honoring the men of 10th Mountain Division of the US Army, who trained during World War II at Camp Hale in central Colorado. They provide a unique opportunity for backcountry skiing, mountain biking, or hiking while staying in safe, comfortable shelter.

== Gallery ==
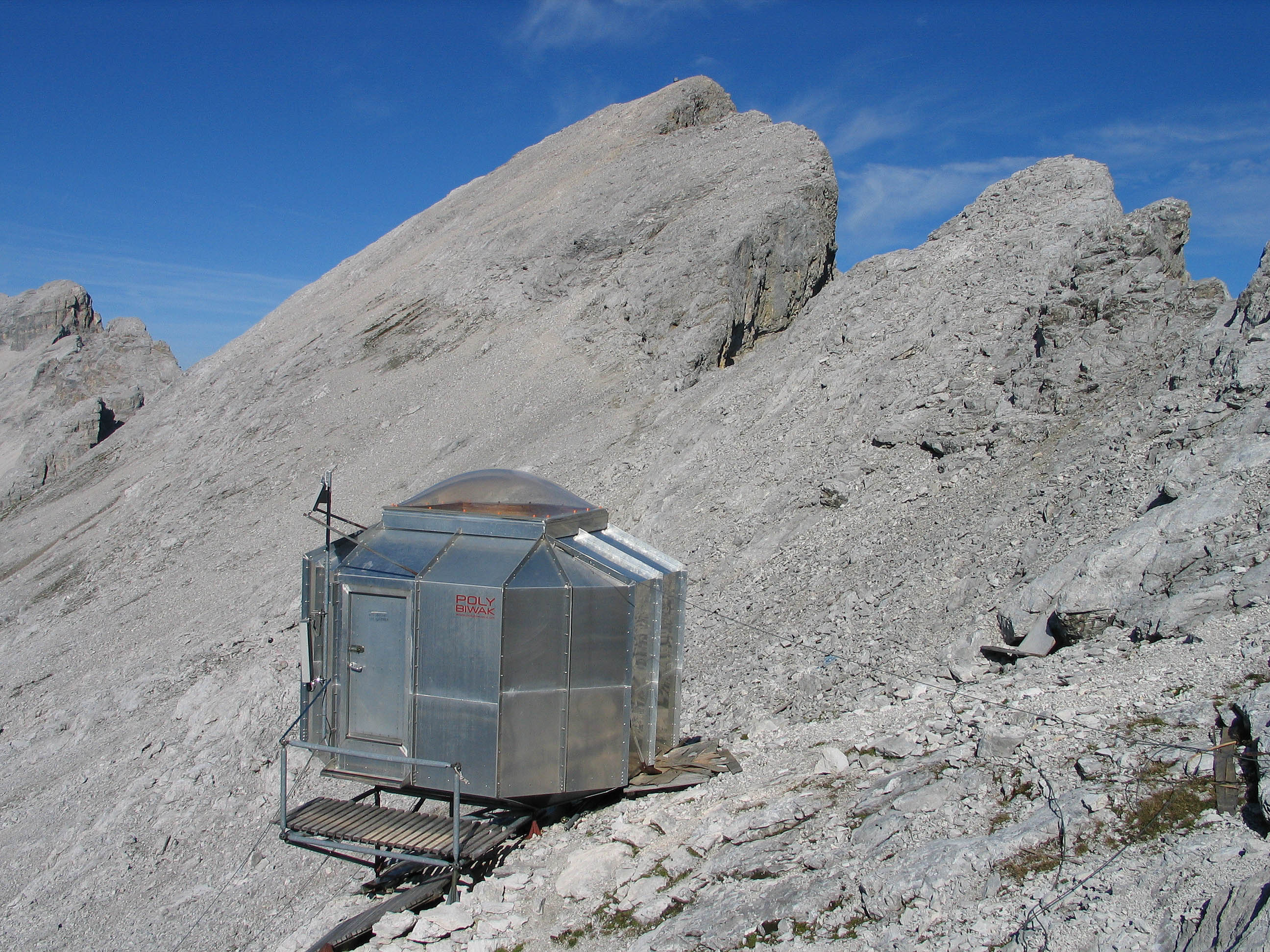
Biwakschachtel, or bivouac box, Karwendel Mountains, Tyrol, Austria,

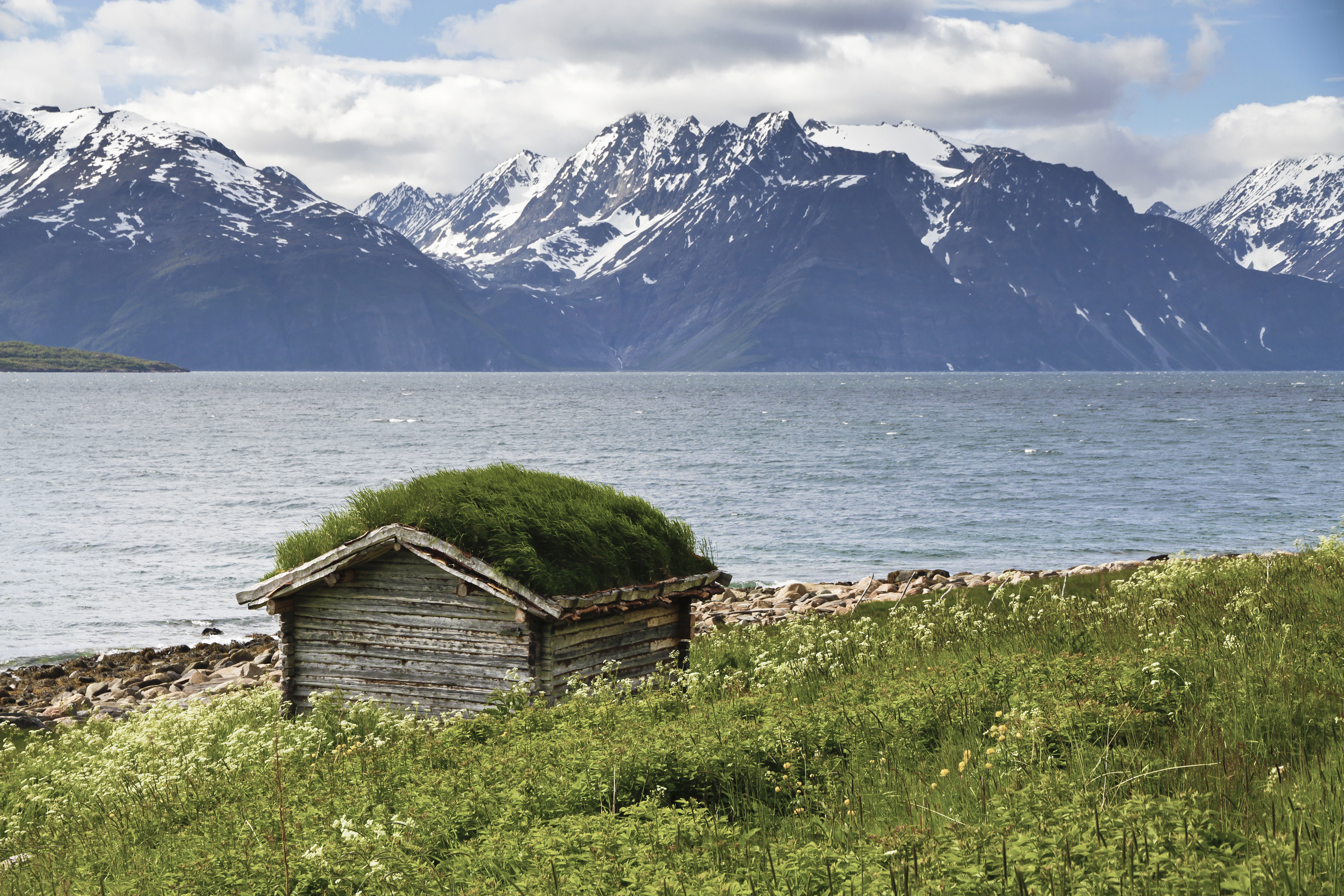
Wilderness hut at Lyngen fjord, Norway

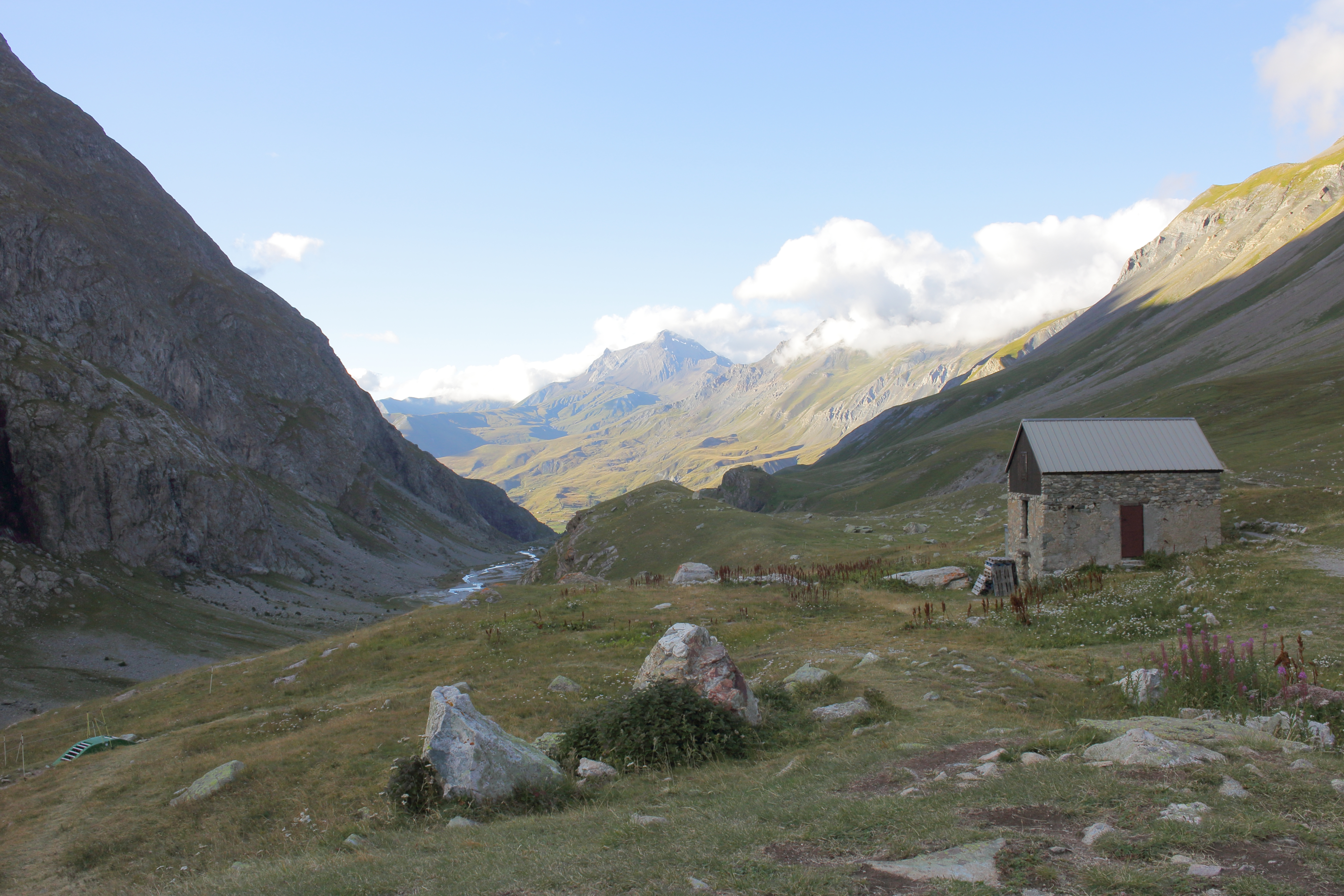
Villar-d'Arêne, Massif des Écrins, French Alps

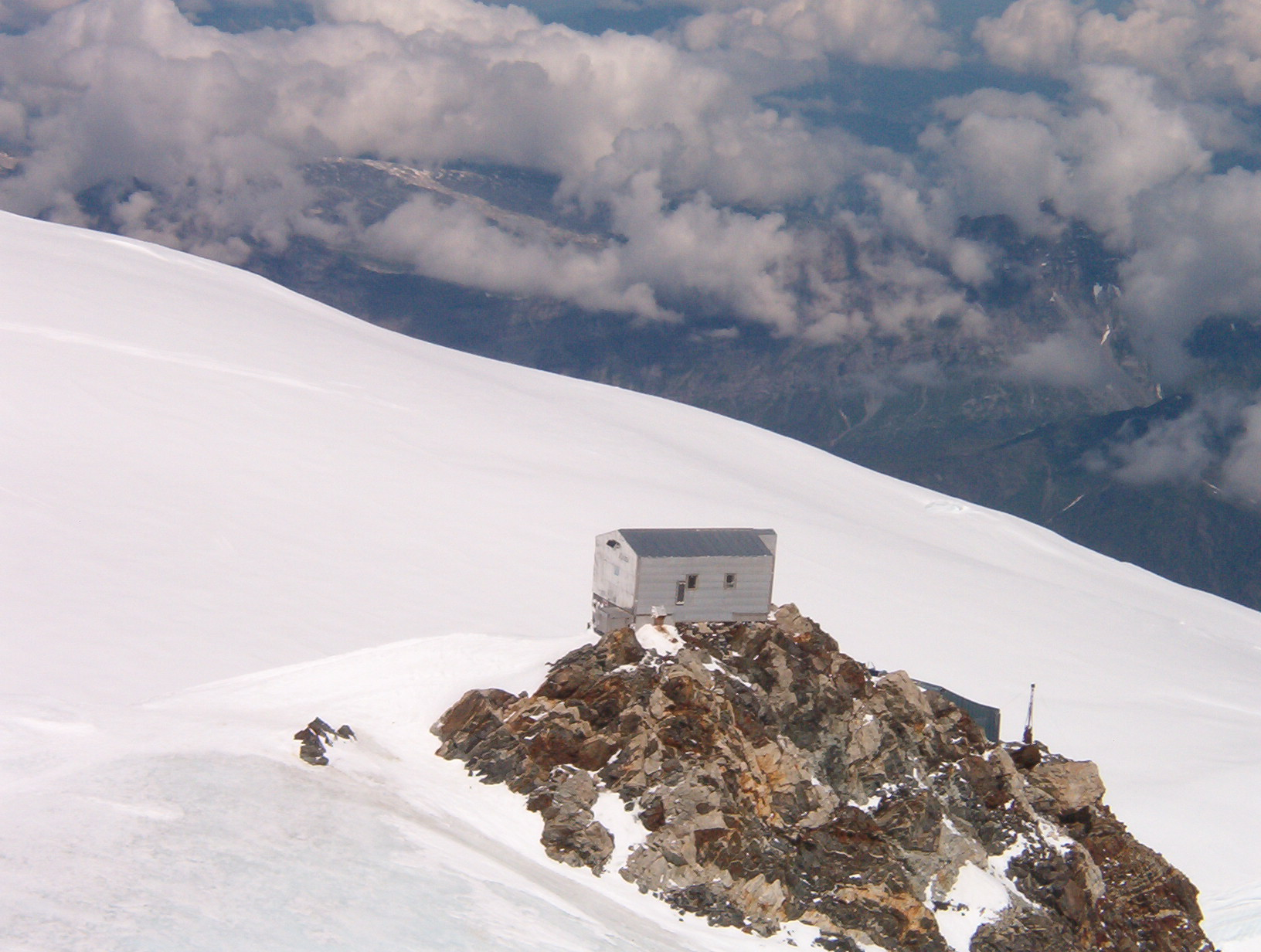
Vallot Capanna, Mont Blanc, Switzerland

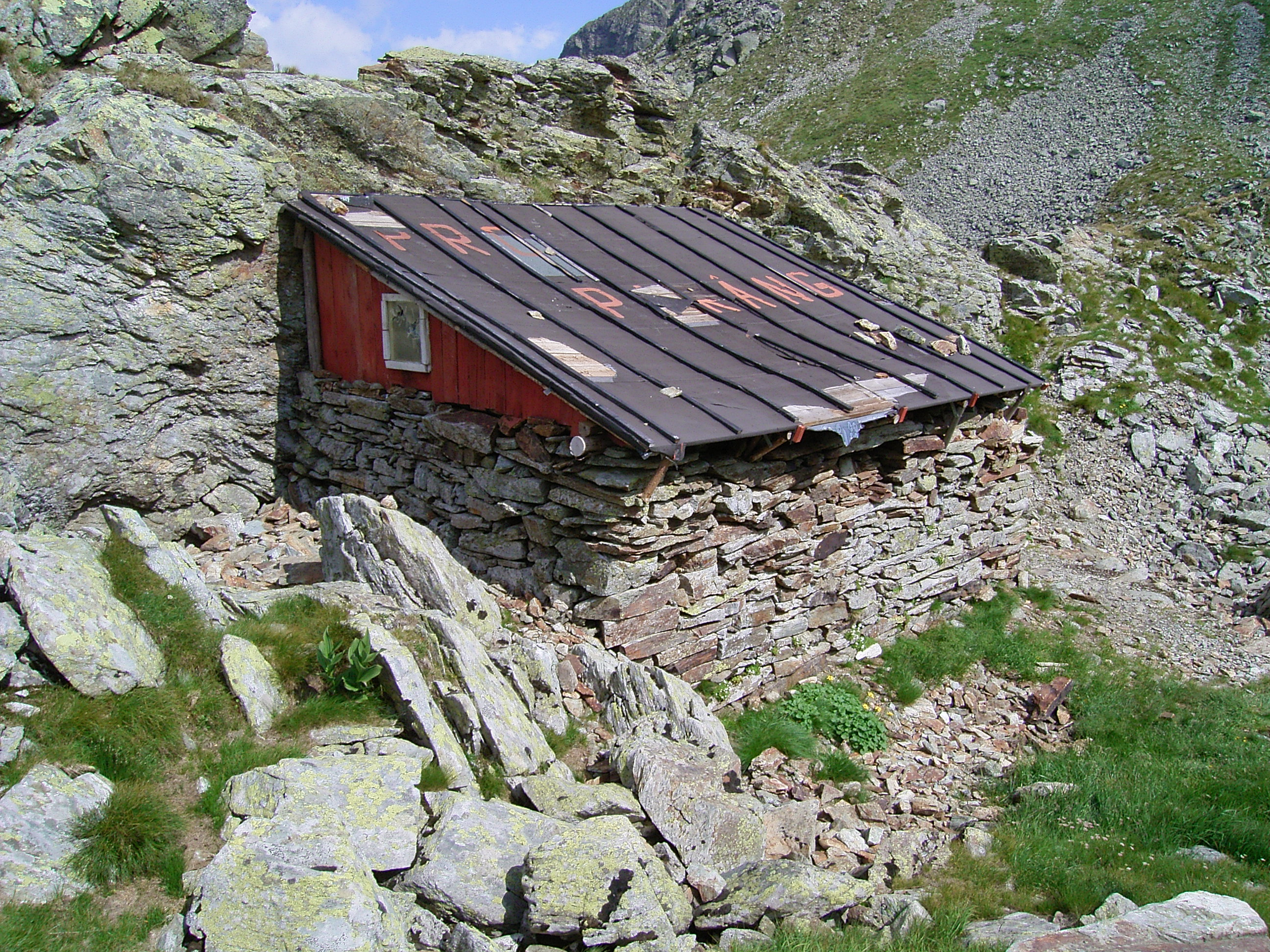
Wilderness hut, Southern Carpathians Mountains, Romania

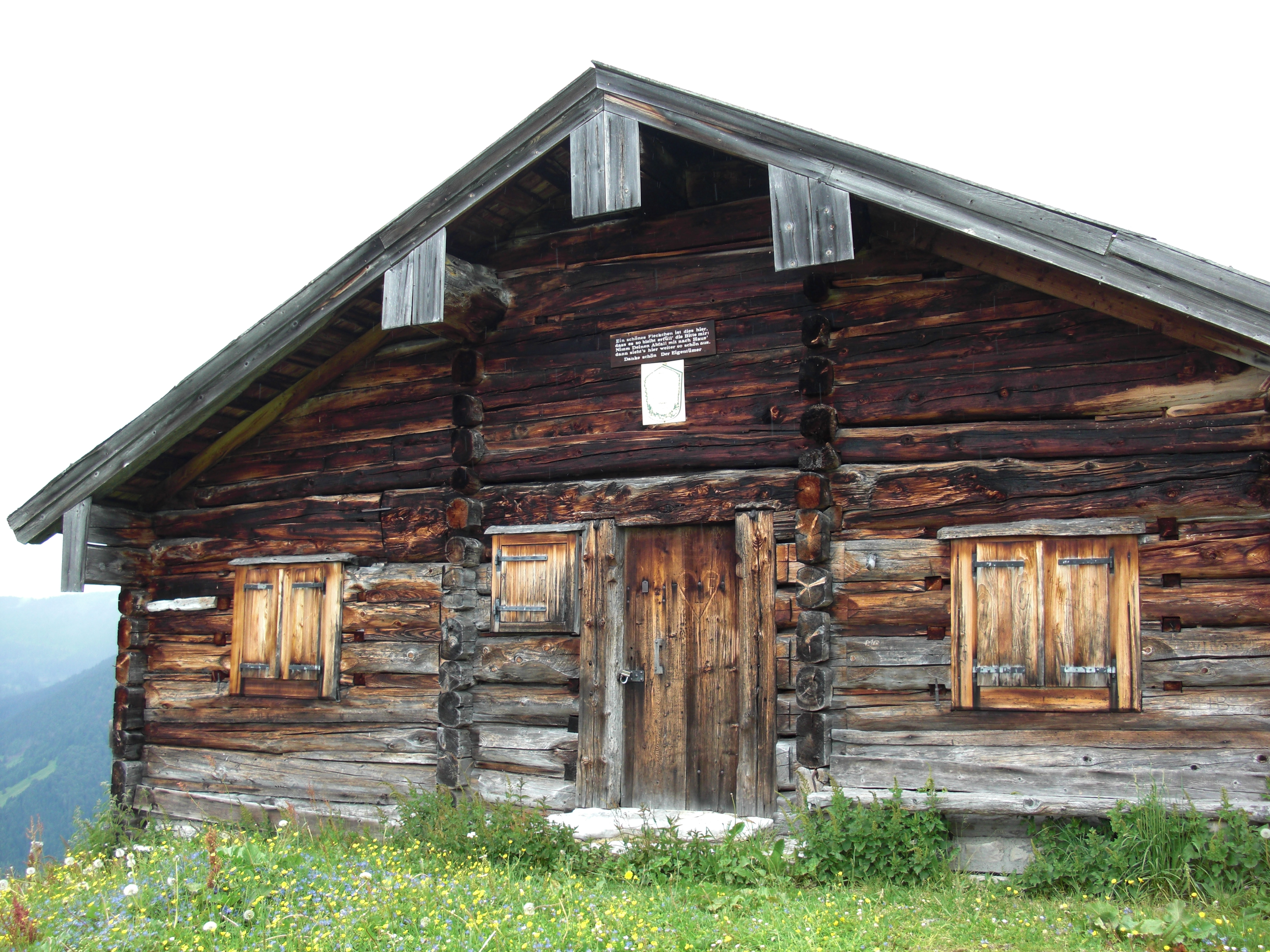
Gappenalm, Austria

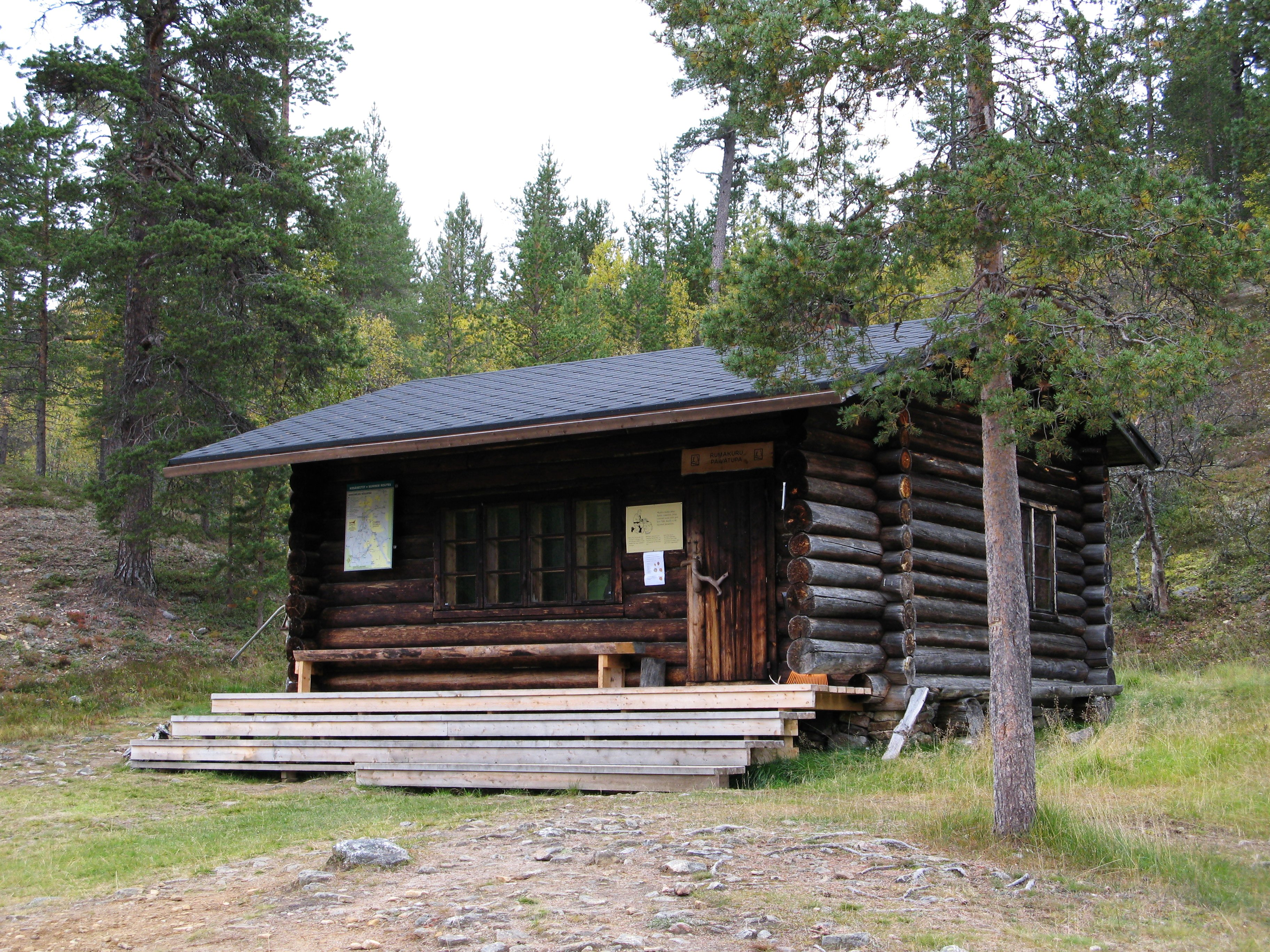
Wilderness hut in Urho Kekkonen National Park, Lappland, Finland

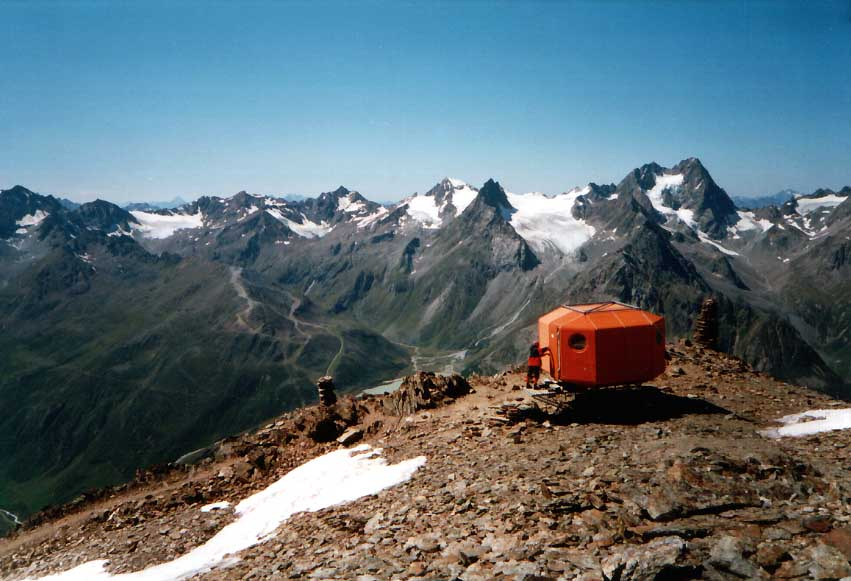
Rhineland-Palatinate hut on the Wassertalkogel, Austria

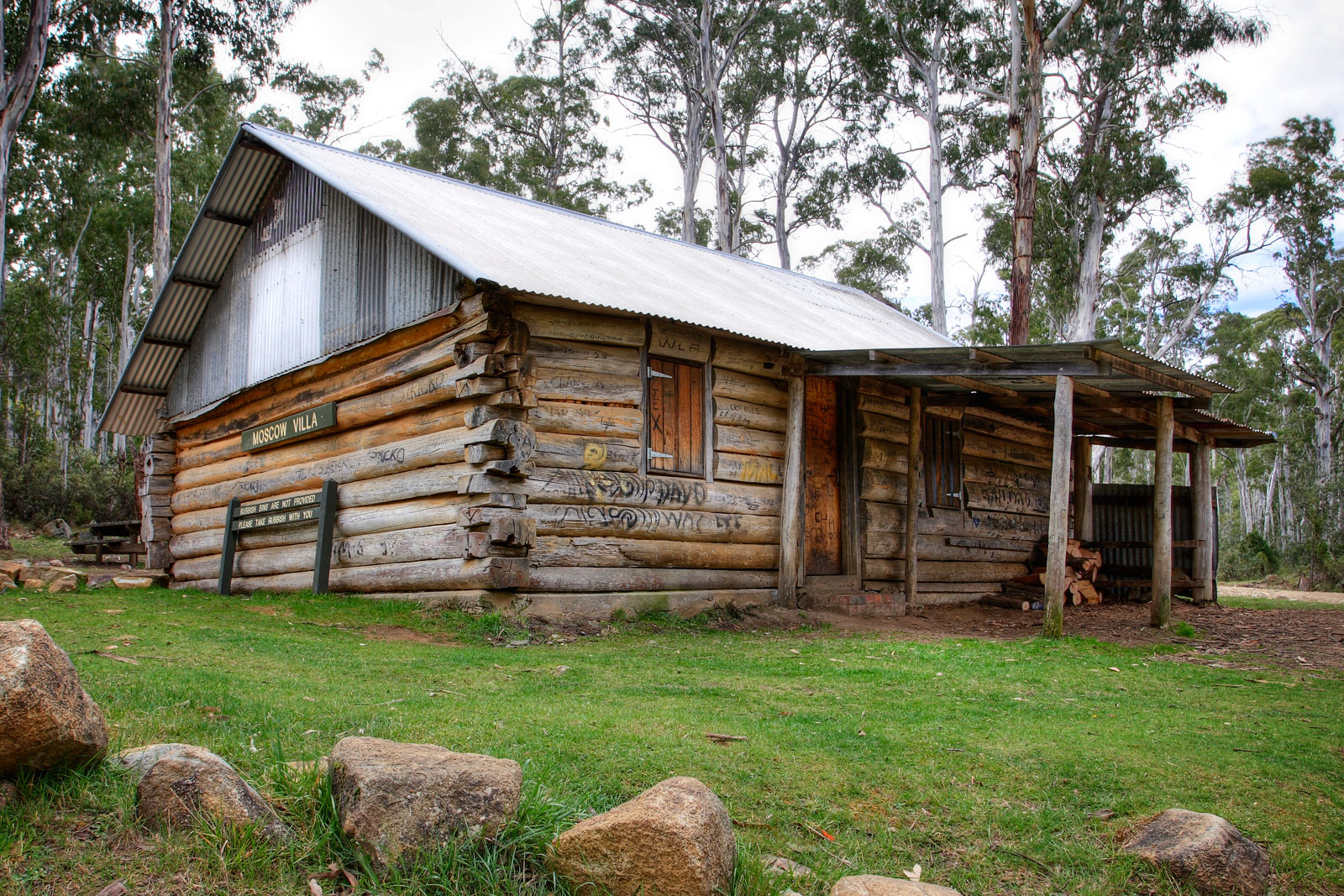
Moscow Villa in Victoria, Australia

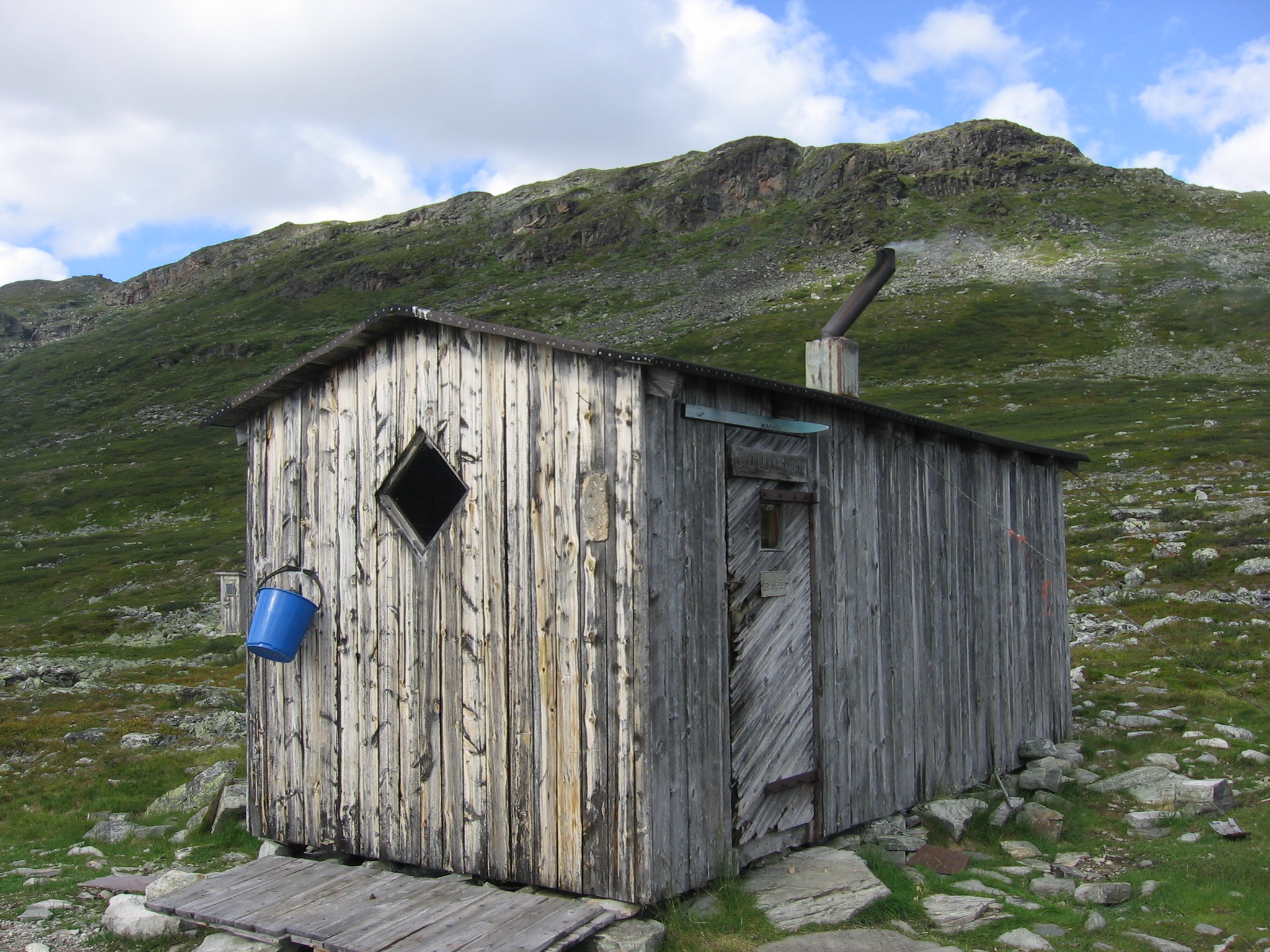
Wilderness hut, Käsivarsi Wilderness Area, Finnish Lapland.

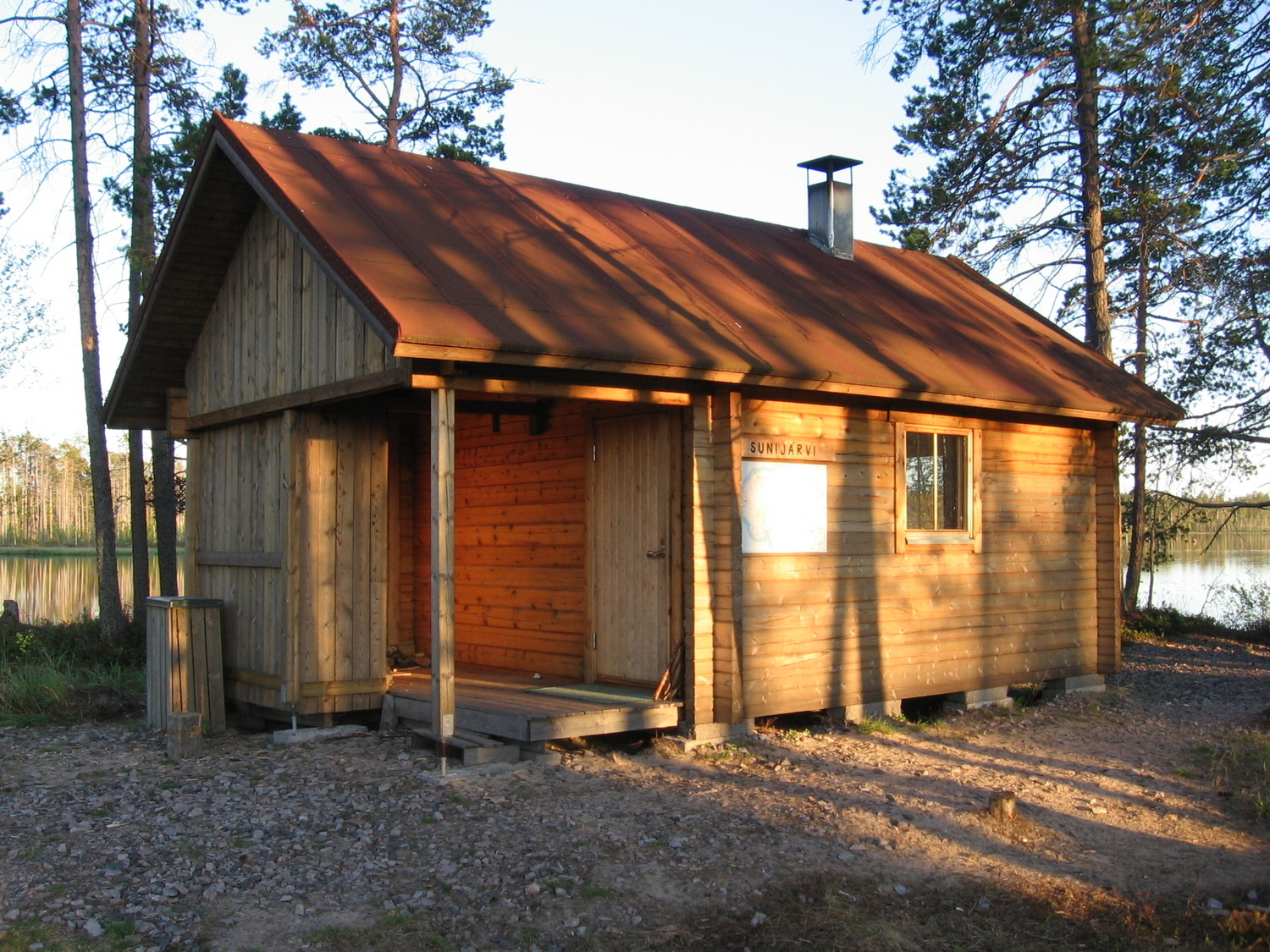
Wilderness Hut at the Lake Sunijärvi in Hailuoto, Finland

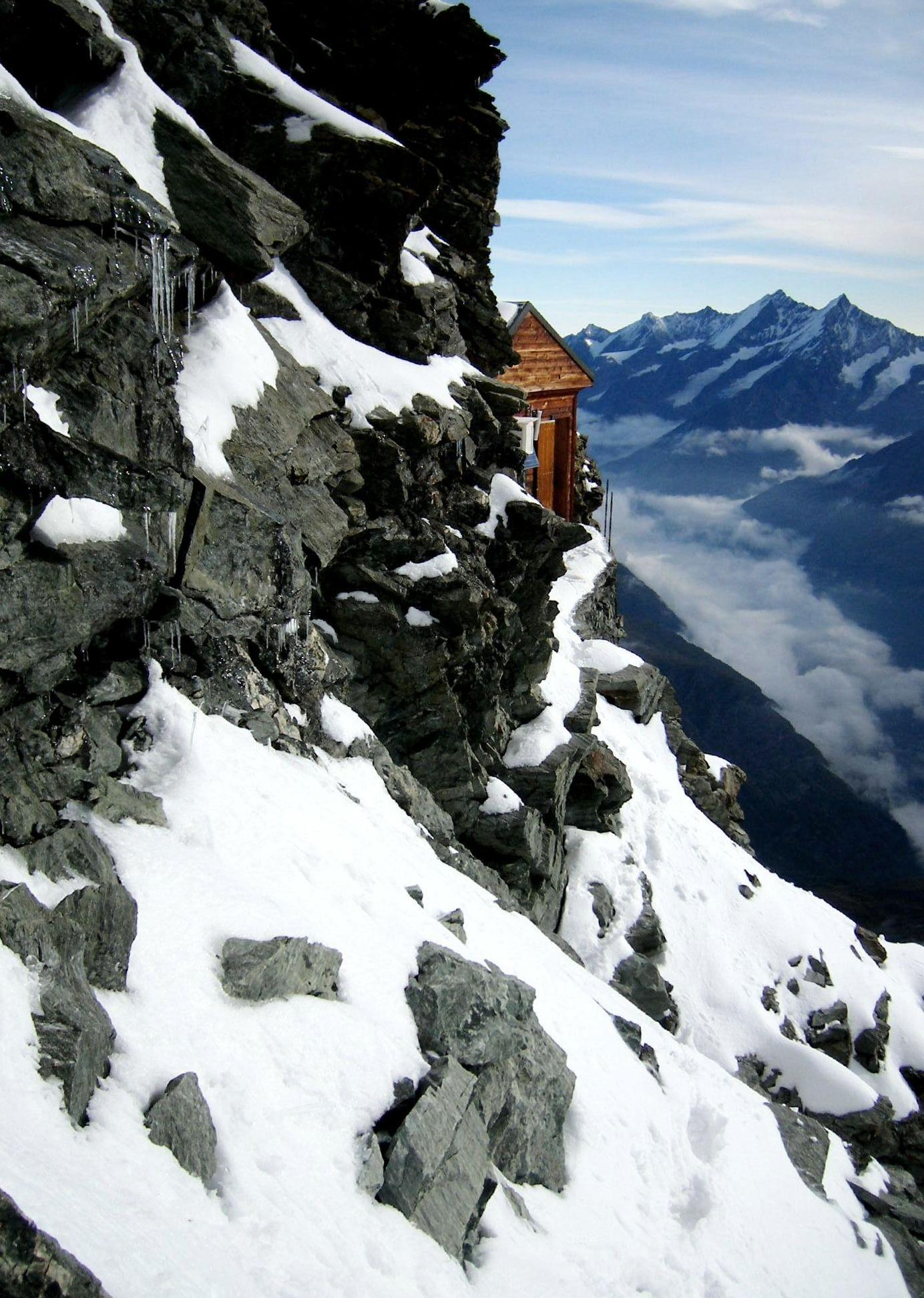
The Solvay Hut (Hörnli Ridge) of the Matterhorn, near Zermatt, Switzerland. At 4,003 metres (13,133 ft)

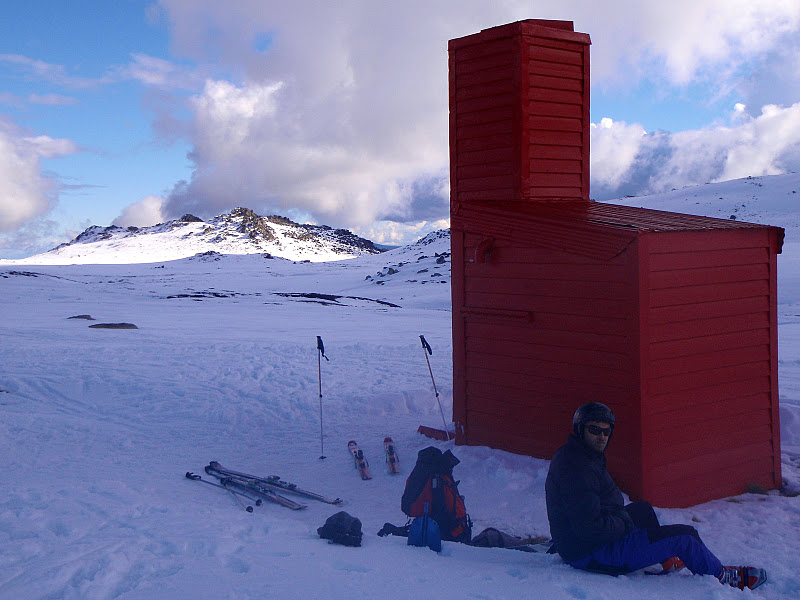
Cootapatamba Hut, a survival hut in the river valley south of Mount Kosciuszko, in the Kosciuszko National Park, New South Wales, Australia
