= Bivouac =

Bivouac is a type of camp or shelter. The term may refer to:

- Bivouac (ants), an ant nest constructed out of the living ant worker's own bodies
- Bivouac box, form of mountain hut for refuge
- Bivouac (horse), an Australian thoroughbred racehorse
- Bivouac (military), a military camp
- Bivouac shelter, an extremely lightweight alternative to traditional tent systems

== Places ==
- Bivouac Peak, a mountain in the Teton Range, Grand Teton National Park, Wyoming, United States

== Music ==
- Bivouac (band), a UK indie rock band of the 1990s
- Bivouac (album), a 1992 album by the U.S. band Jawbreaker
