= Solvay Hut =

Hut on the Matterhorn in Switzerland

Coordinates: 45°58′43.5″N 7°39′46.5″E

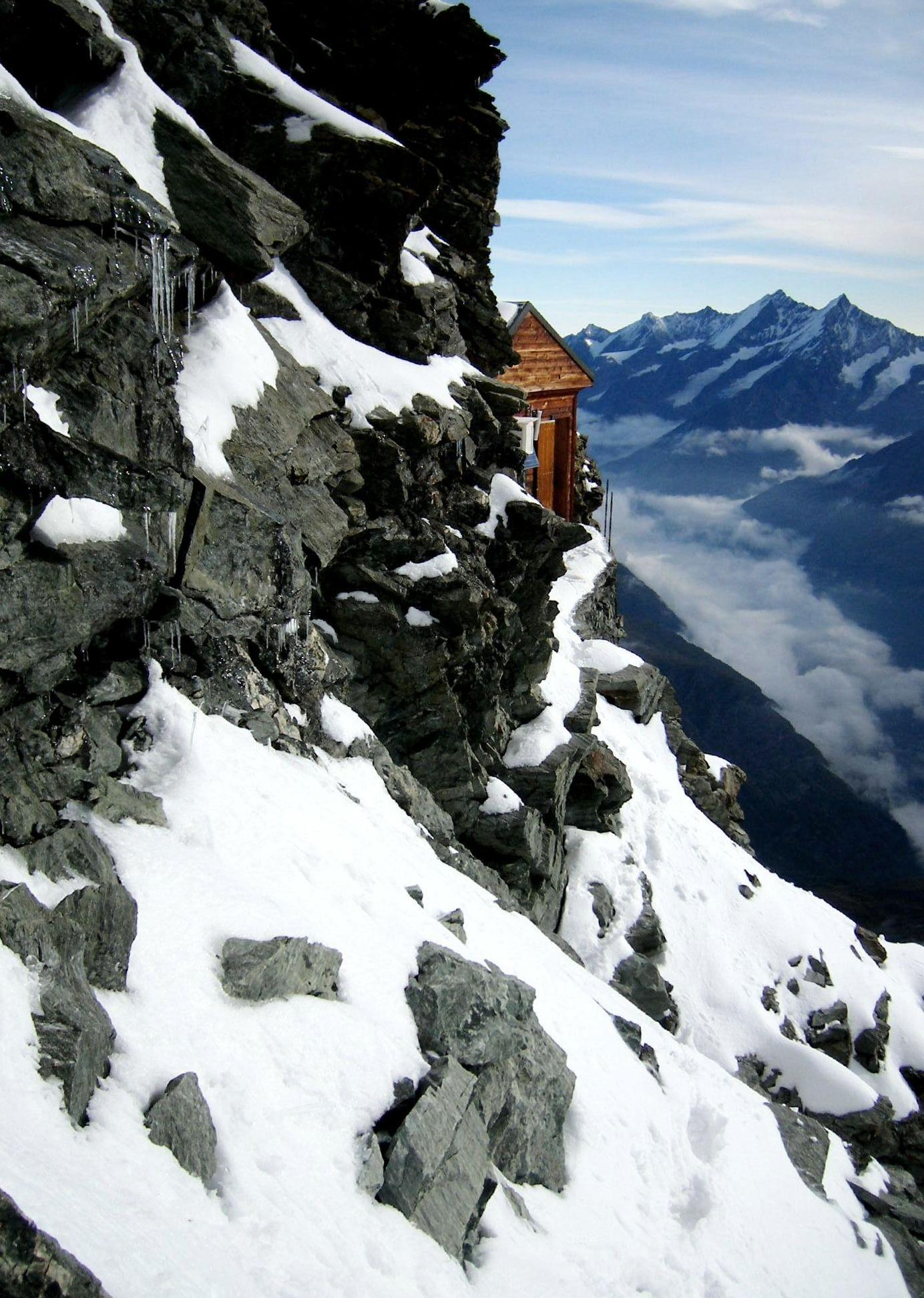
Solvay Hut

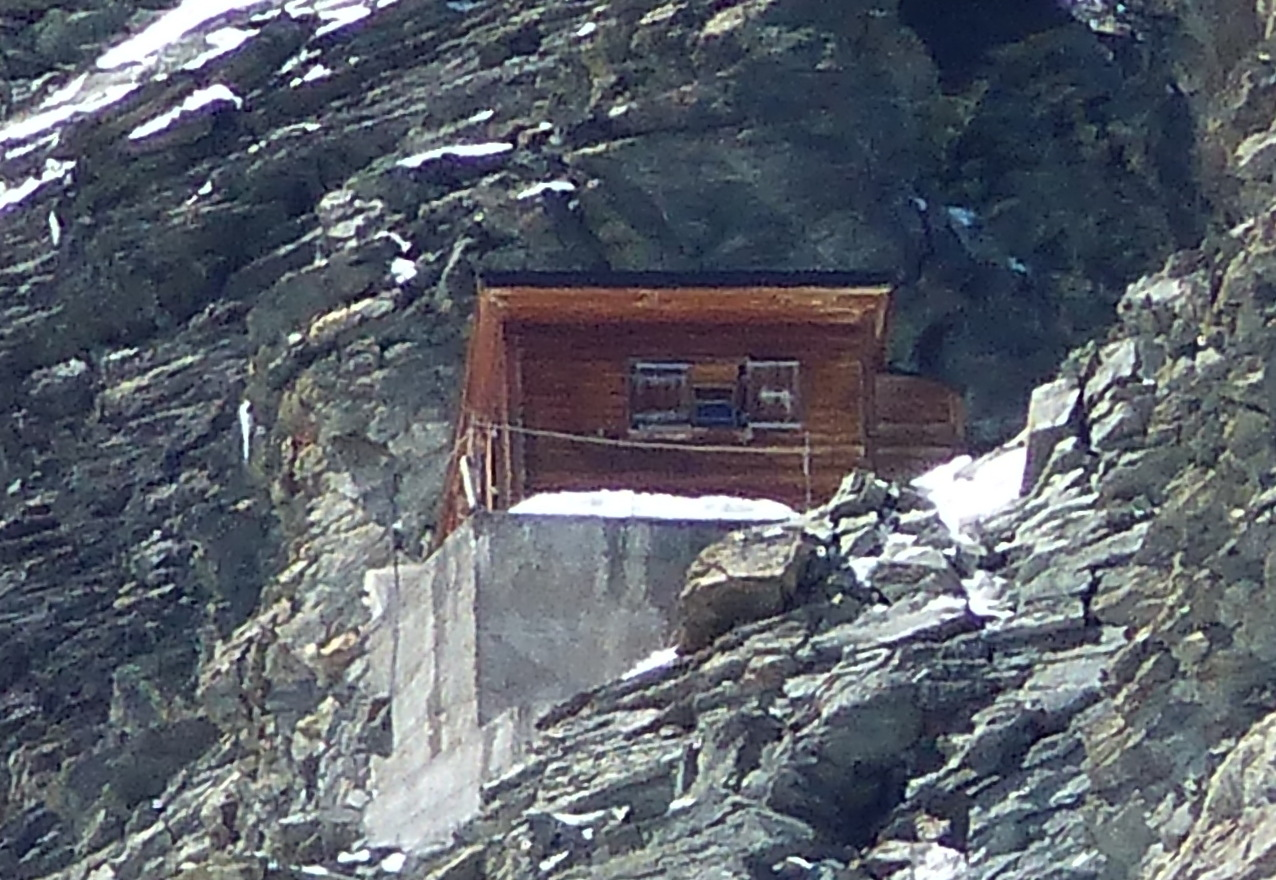
Solvay Hut photographed from Hörnli Hut with tele lens

The Solvay Hut or Solvay Bivouac (German: Solvayhütte) is a mountain hut located on the north-eastern ridge (Hörnli Ridge) of the Matterhorn, near Zermatt in the canton of Valais. At 4,003 metres (13,133 ft) it is the highest mountain hut owned by the Swiss Alpine Club, but can be used only in case of emergency. The Hörnli Hut, lying 700 meters below on the same ridge, is the starting point of the normal route to the summit.

The Solvay hut was built in 1917, 52 years after the first ascent of the Matterhorn which took place on the same ridge. It offers 10 beds and is equipped with a radiotelephone. The hut was named after Ernest Solvay, a Belgian chemist and industrialist who in 1904 donated 20,000 francs for its construction.

The building materials for the hut were brought with a cable rising from the Hörnli Hut. It was rebuilt in 1966 and the emergency telephone was installed in 1976.

== See also ==
- List of buildings and structures above 3000 m in Switzerland
- Bivouac Box
