= Wassertalkogel =

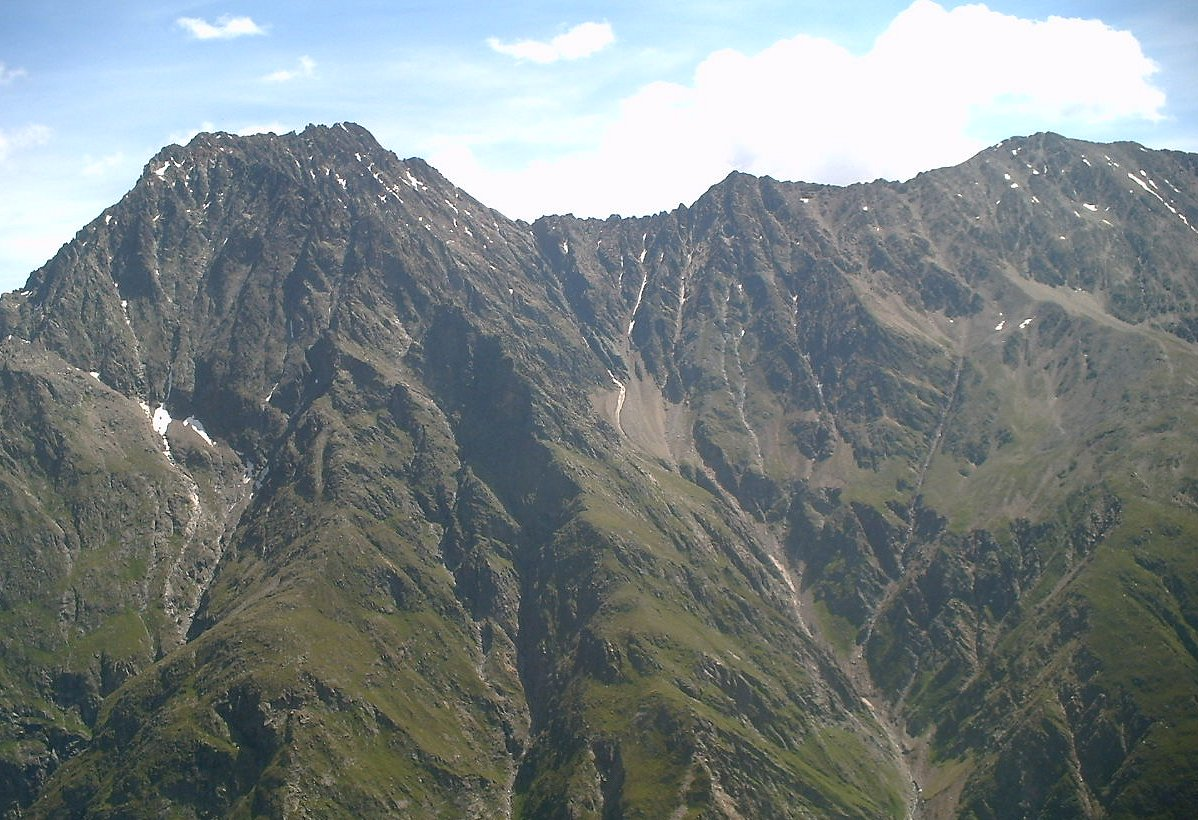
- Puitkogel (left) and Wassertalkogel from the west across Pitz valley

Highest point
- Elevation: 3,247 m (10,653 ft)
- Prominence: 175 m (574 ft)
- Parent peak: Puitkogel
- Coordinates: 46°58′01″N 10°54′19″E

Geography
- Location within Austria
- Location: Tyrol, Austria
- Parent range: Ötztal Alps

Climbing
- First ascent: 29 Aug 1895 by Rudolf L. Kusdas (much earlier by locals)
- Easiest route: South ridge from the Rüsselsheimer Hütte (UIAA-I)

The Wassertalkogel is a mountain in the Geigenkamm group of the Ötztal Alps.
