= Cootapatamba Hut =

Survival shelter in New South Wales, Australia

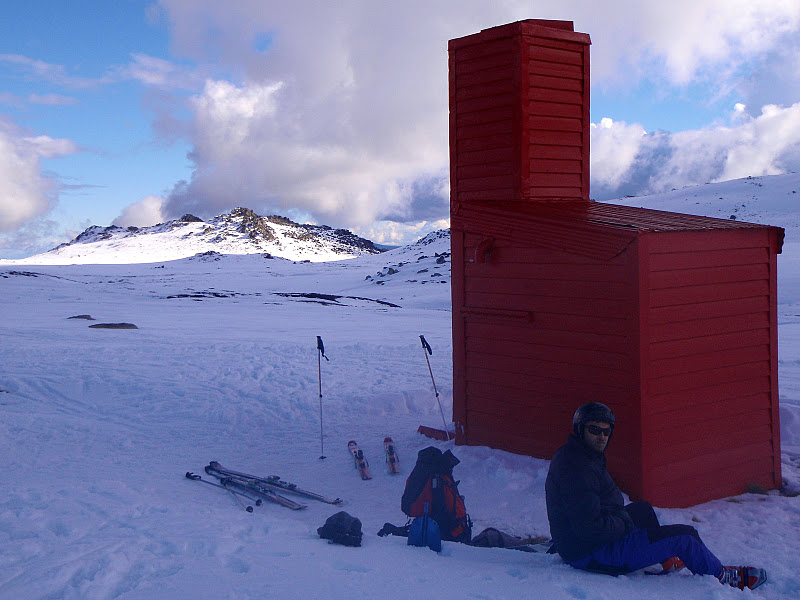
- A skier rests outside Cootapatamba Hut in late September 2010
- Interactive map of the Cootapatamba Hut area

General information
- Coordinates: 36°28′39.2″S 148°15′22.2″E

Cootapatamba Hut is a survival shelter in the river valley south of Mount Kosciuszko, in the Kosciuszko National Park, New South Wales, Australia.

The hut was originally built by the Snowy Mountains Hydroelectric Authority, previously known as the Snowy Mountains Authority (SMA), in the 1950s, as part of the Snowy Mountains Hydro-electric Scheme. The hut was placed strategically in the river valley to catch people leaving the summit of Mount Kosciusko in poor weather, where the path down the valley would appear to head to safer areas, despite it leading into deeper wilderness. The bright red paint means the hut is clearly visible from Mount Kosciusko.

In early 2019 the National Parks and Wildlife Service (NPSW) inspected the hut and decided that it should be rebuilt. Due to the hut being heritage listed, the design had to comply with strict heritage guidelines. In February and March 2019, the old hut was moved. A new frame, using steel supports, was concreted into position. By April 2019, following multiple setbacks, including bushfires and gale-force winds, the new replica hut was completed.

The hut has two entrances: One from a door at ground level, and another on the roof to access the hut in deep snow.
