= Puitkogel =

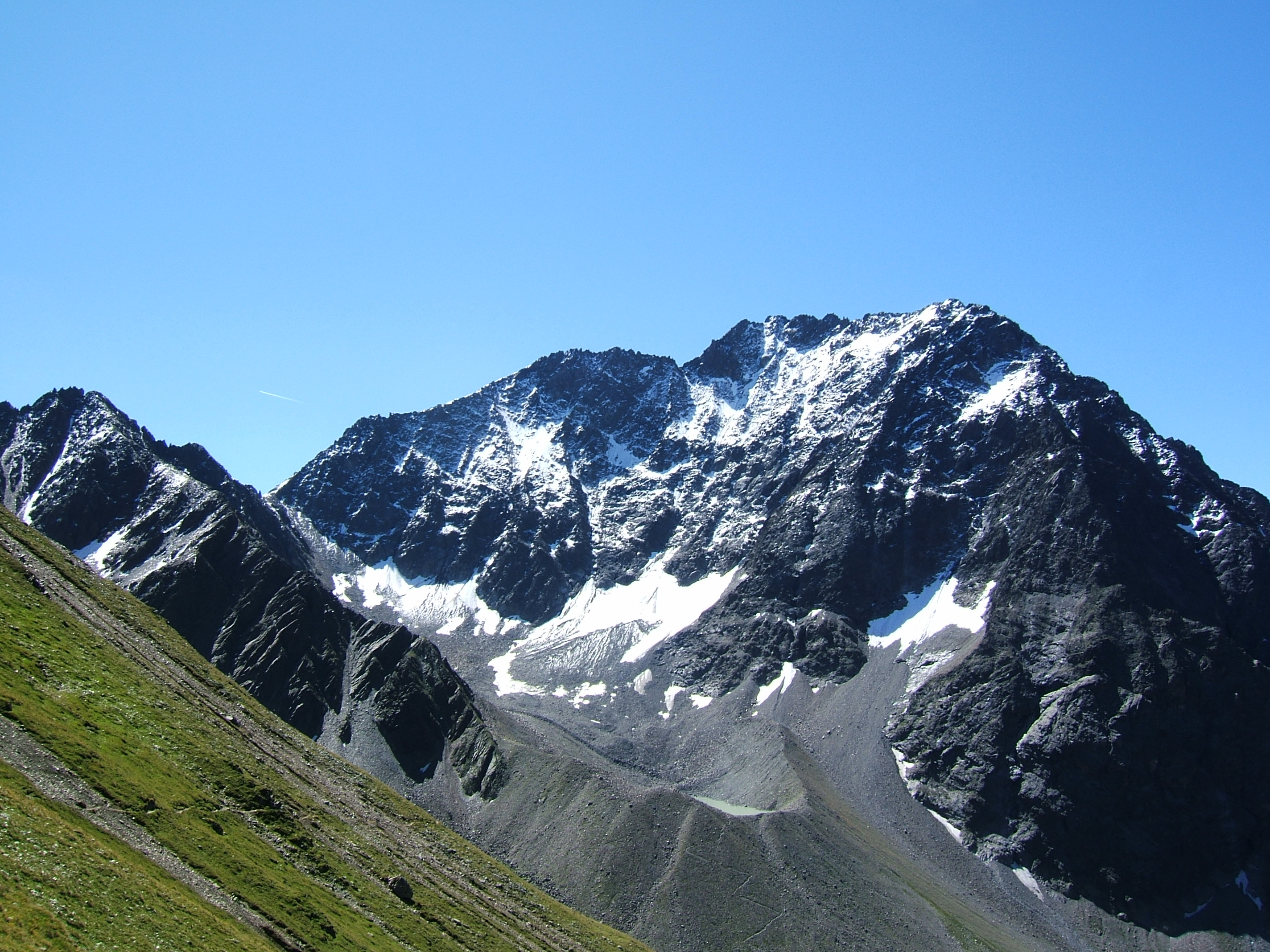
- Puitkogel from the northwest from Gabinten near the Rüsselsheimer Hütte.

Highest point
- Elevation: 3,345 m (10,974 ft)
- Prominence: 390 m (1,280 ft)
- Parent peak: Hohe Geige
- Listing: Alpine mountains above 3000 m
- Coordinates: 46°58′53″N 10°54′05″E

Geography
- Location within Austria
- Location: Tyrol, Austria
- Parent range: Ötztal Alps

Climbing
- First ascent: 29 Aug 1894 by F. Lantscher und F. Gstrein
- Easiest route: South ridge from the Rüsselsheimer Hütte (UIAA-II)

The Puitkogel is a mountain in the Geigenkamm group of the Ötztal Alps.
