= Bivouac box =

Fixed shelter for mountain climbers

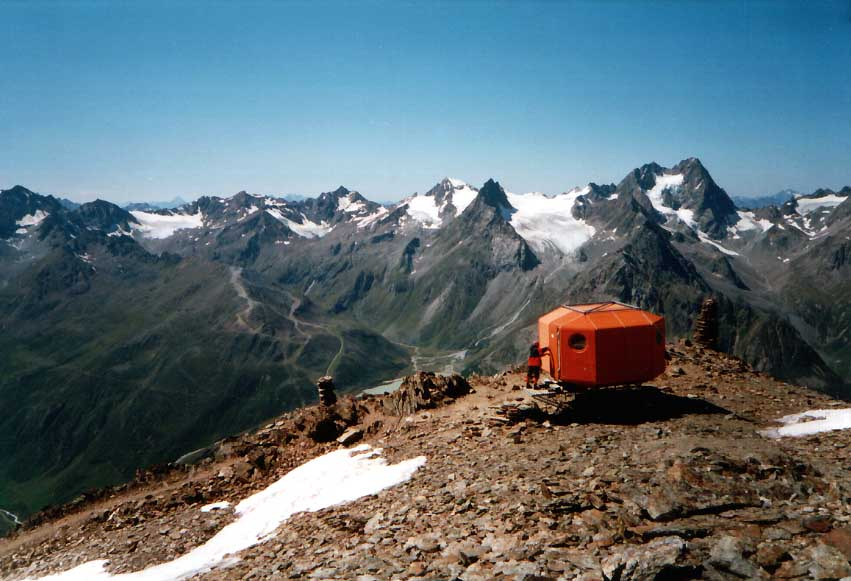
Orange bivouac box made of fibreglass: the Rhineland-Palatinate bivouac, erected in 1973 on the Mainzer Höhenweg, in front of the Watzespitze (August 2000)

A bivouac box is a prefabricated shelter for mountain hikers or climbers, typically providing a sleeping area for 4–12 people. They are usually located in remote locations, far from serviced mountain huts and other accommodations. On some via ferratas, mountain trails, or long-distance hiking trails, they are used for overnight stays (bivouacs). They often also serve as base camps for mountaineers and climbers for nearby climbing routes and mountain tours.

== Description ==
The typical bivouac box construction consists of a small tin, corrugated iron, wooden, or plastic shell that contains as many sleeping spaces as possible and is visible from afar. They have a small entrance on the side away from the weather and is only lightly insulated. It usually contains blankets, candles, snow shovels, some emergency supplies, and a hut book; more rarely, an emergency telephone, a stove, or a furnace. The shelter has neither running water nor a toilet. The entrance door, usually unlocked, is located high enough to be opened even in snowy conditions.

In the high mountains, bivouac boxes are usually set up in mountain hollows or near passes (mountain saddles, notches). Only a few are located on mountain peaks, such as the Hoher Grimming in the Styrian Limestone Alps. Frequently climbed and sought-after mountains with difficult standard ascents sometimes have a bivouac box near the summit, such as Piz Badile or Langkofel. In the Western Alps, bivouac boxes are often located at the beginning of ridge climbs.

The emergency shelters are usually maintained by the Alpine Club chapters. All users of a bivouac are required to take their waste with them and leave everything in a tidy manner. For this purpose, as well as to keep the mountain huts and trails clean, the Austrian Alpine Clubs (ÖAV) and German Alpine Clubs (DAV) launched the Clean Mountains campaign in 2005.

Winter or emergency rooms in shelters that are not open all year round have an identical function.

Bivouac boxes are increasingly being used as overnight accommodations on the mountain or as party locations, which is not what they were intended for. Sometimes, mess, dirt, garbage, and feces remain in the surrounding area. In the summer of 2020, the Austrian Alpine Club (ÖAV) pointed out, using the Konrad Schuster bivouac as an example, that bivouac boxes are only intended as emergency accommodation or as a base for a longer mountaineering tour.

== Gallery ==
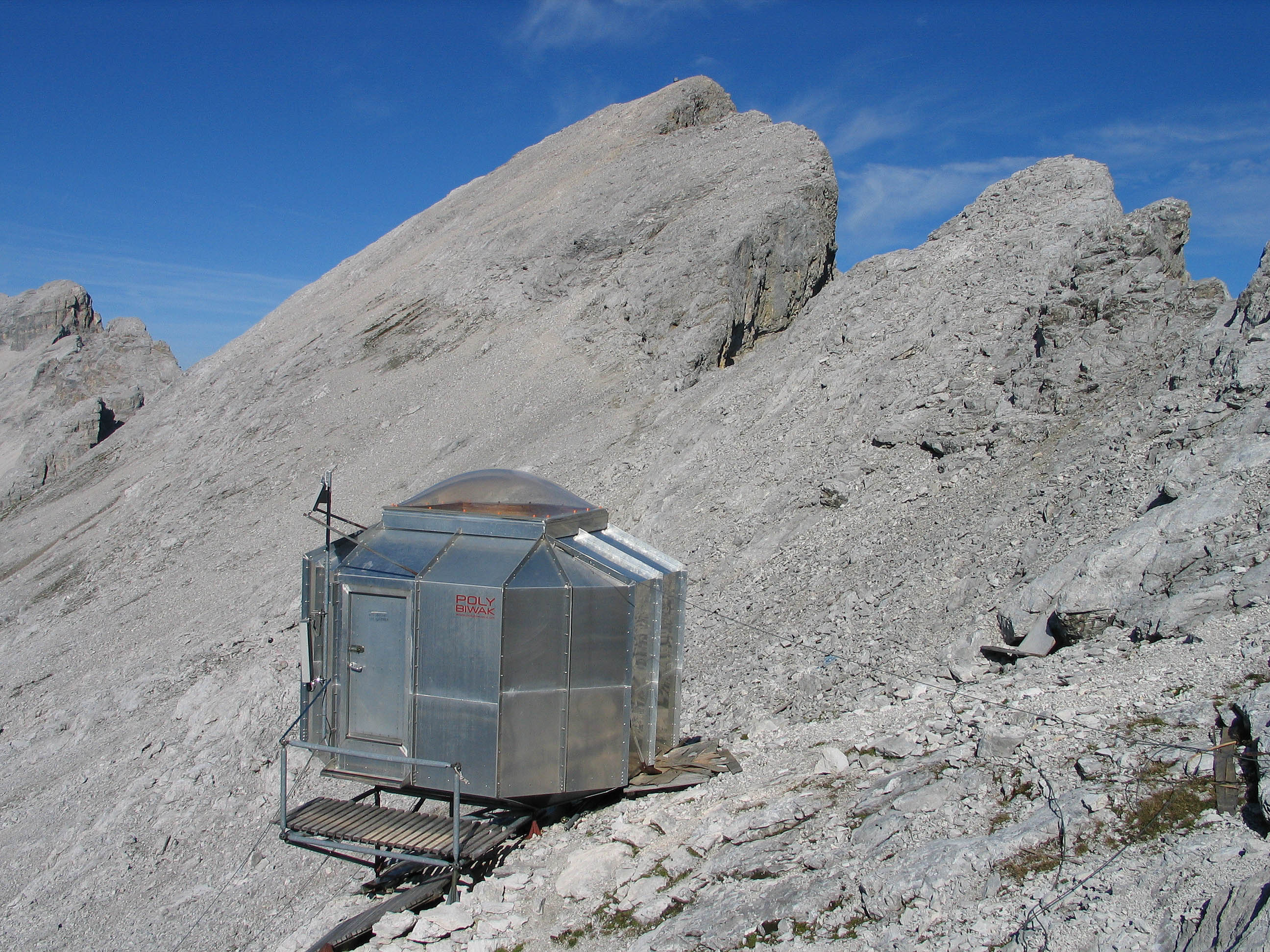
Konrad Schuster bivouac box at the Laliderer Spitze in the Karwendel (Sept. 2006, 2495 m)

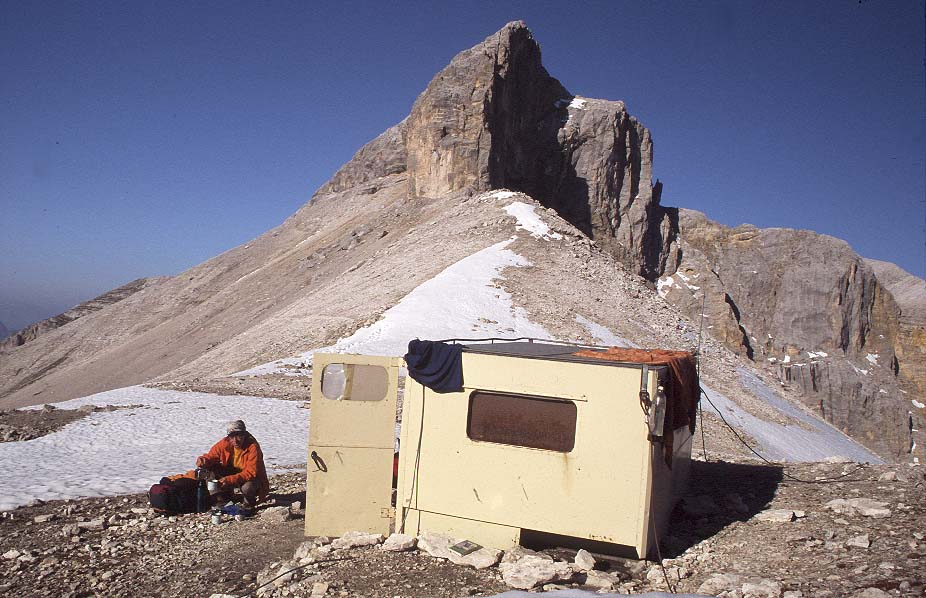
Small bivouac box below the Breitgrieskarscharte in the Karwendel (Sept. 2003)

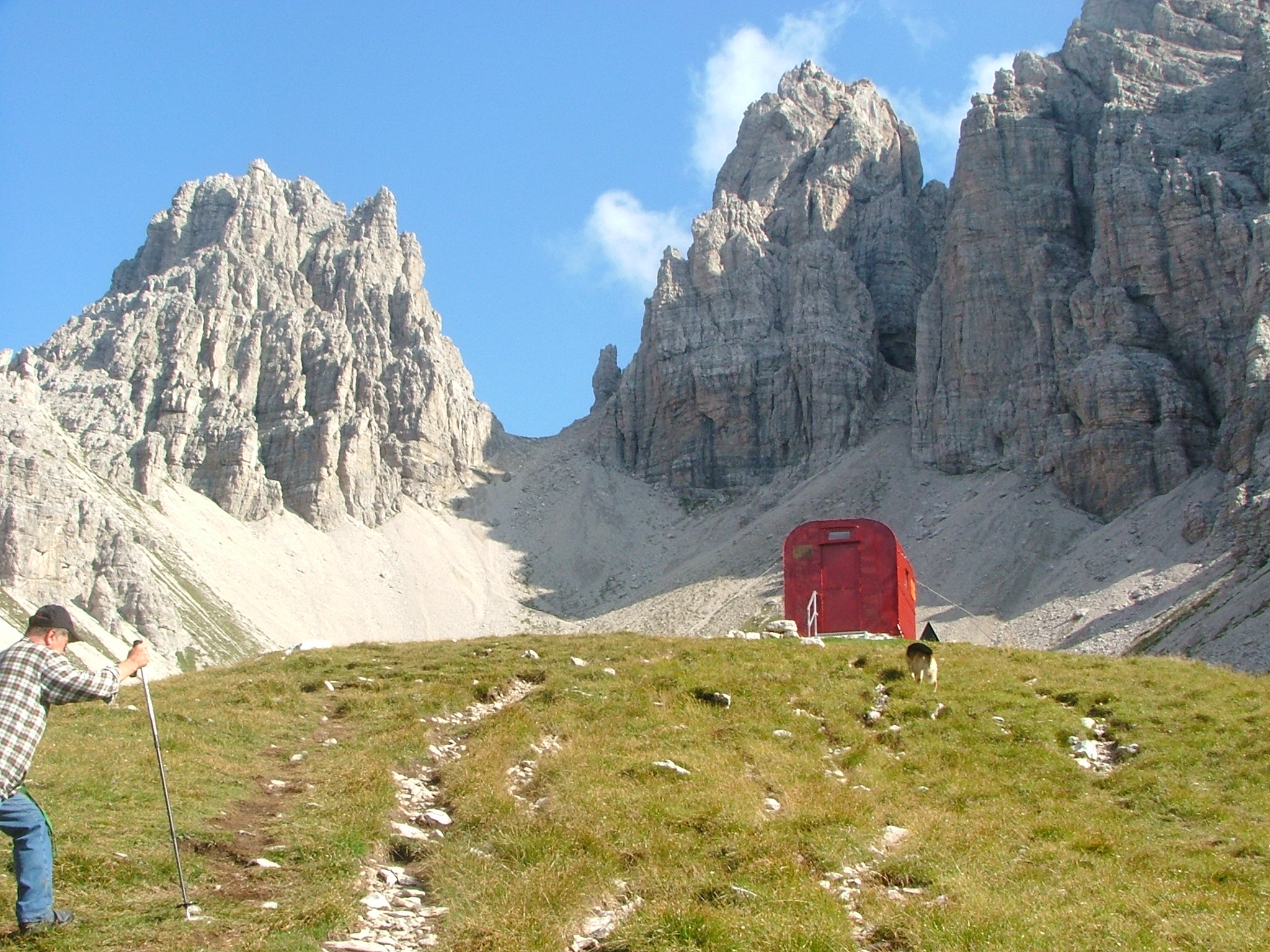
Bivouac box in Val Montanaia, Dolomites (Sept. 2005)

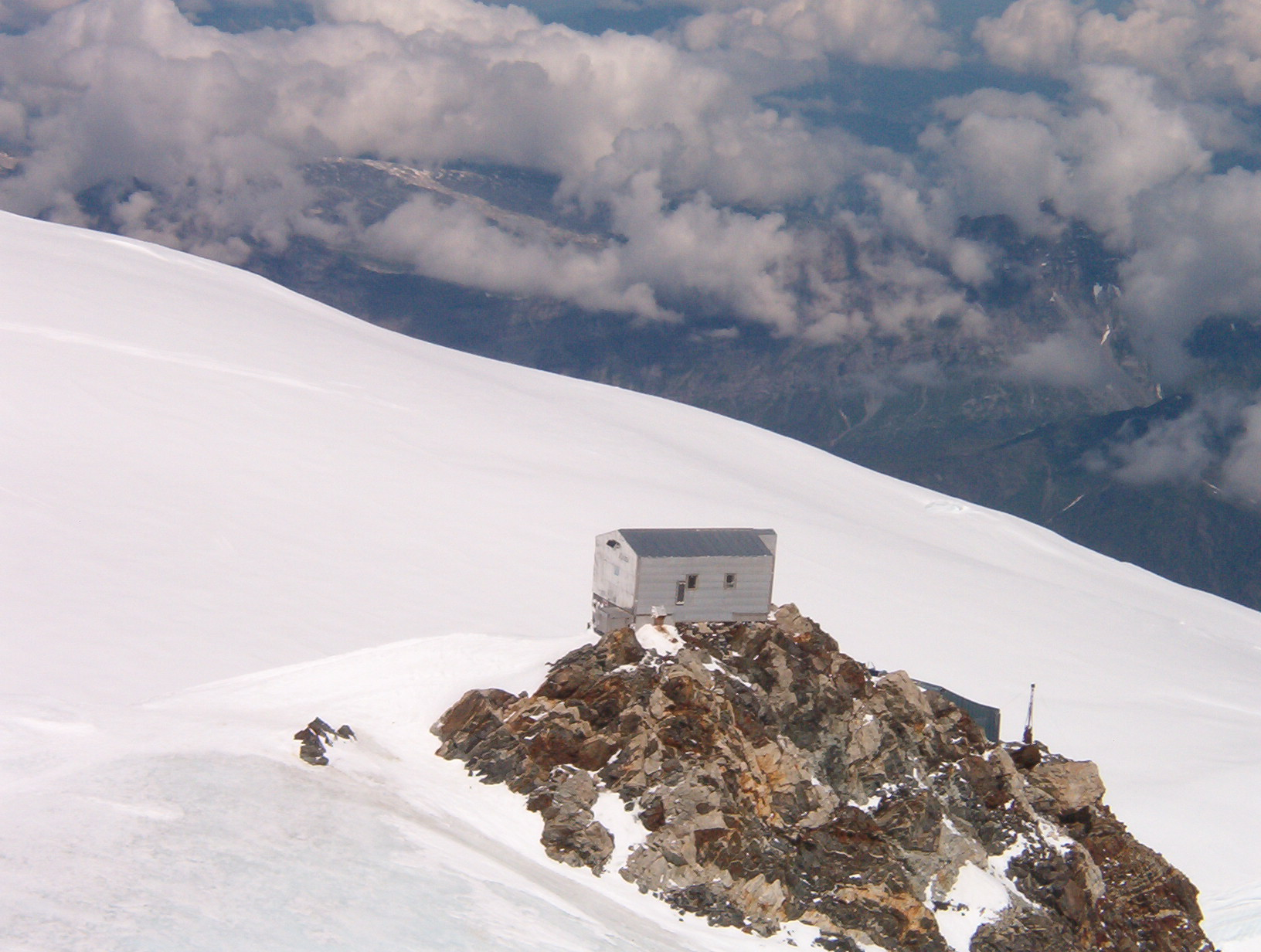
The Vallot Hut on the Bosses Ridge of Mont Blanc (July 2004)

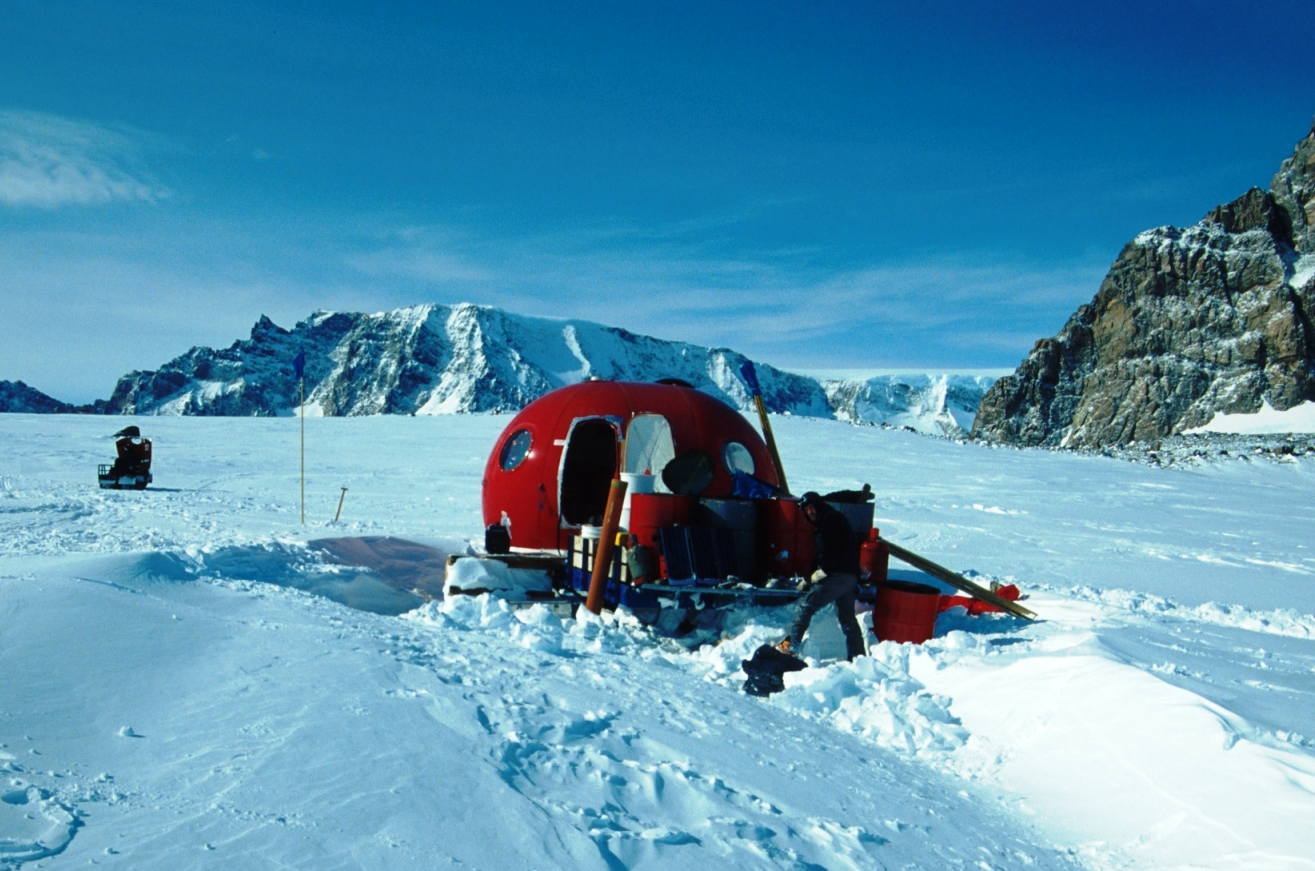
Sled-mounted bivouac box (so-called Apple Hut, made of fiberglass) in Heimefrontfjella (Antarctica) (Feb. 2001)

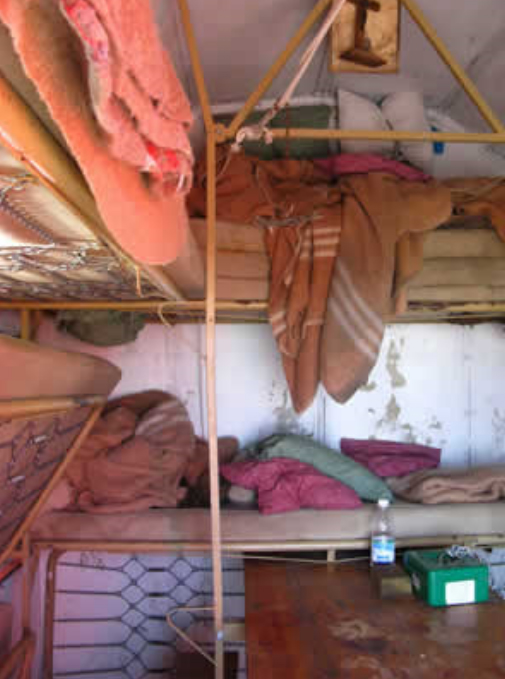
Interior of the Hochjoch bivouac on the Ortler (2008)

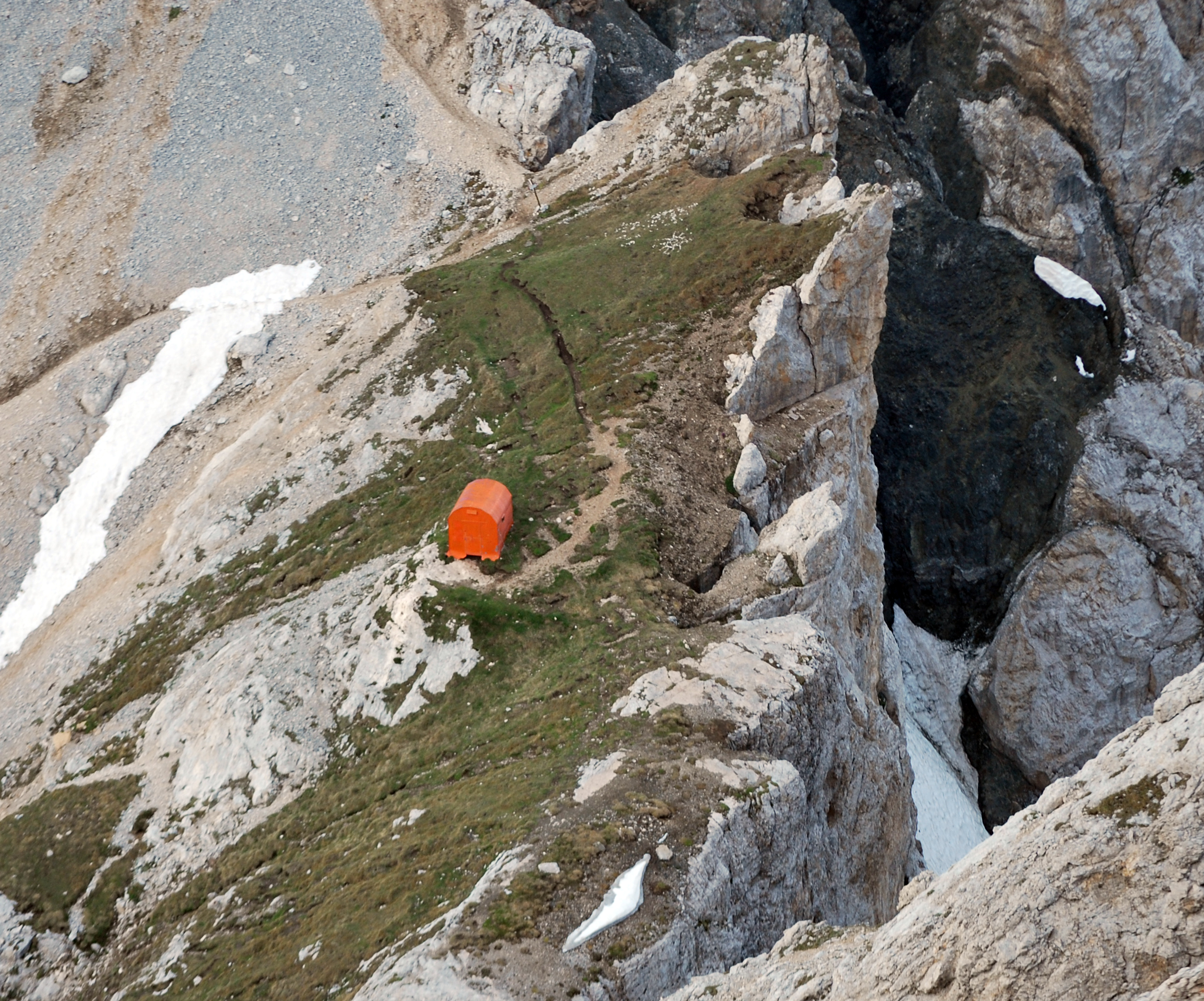
E. Rigatti Bivouac, south of the Latemarspitze, in the Latemarmassiv, Dolomites (June 2010)

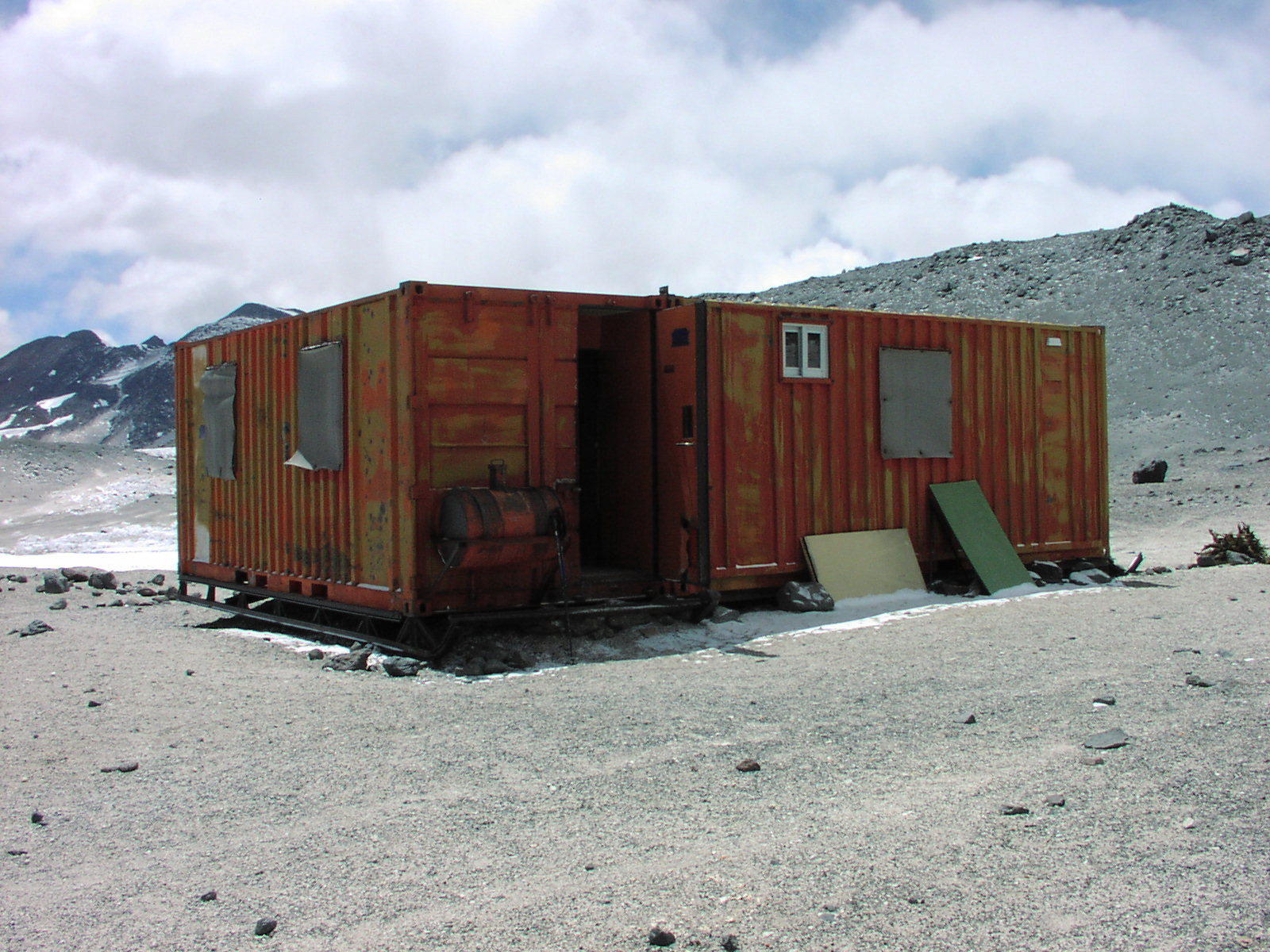
Tejos Shelter at Nevado Ojos del Salado, Chile (Feb. 2004)

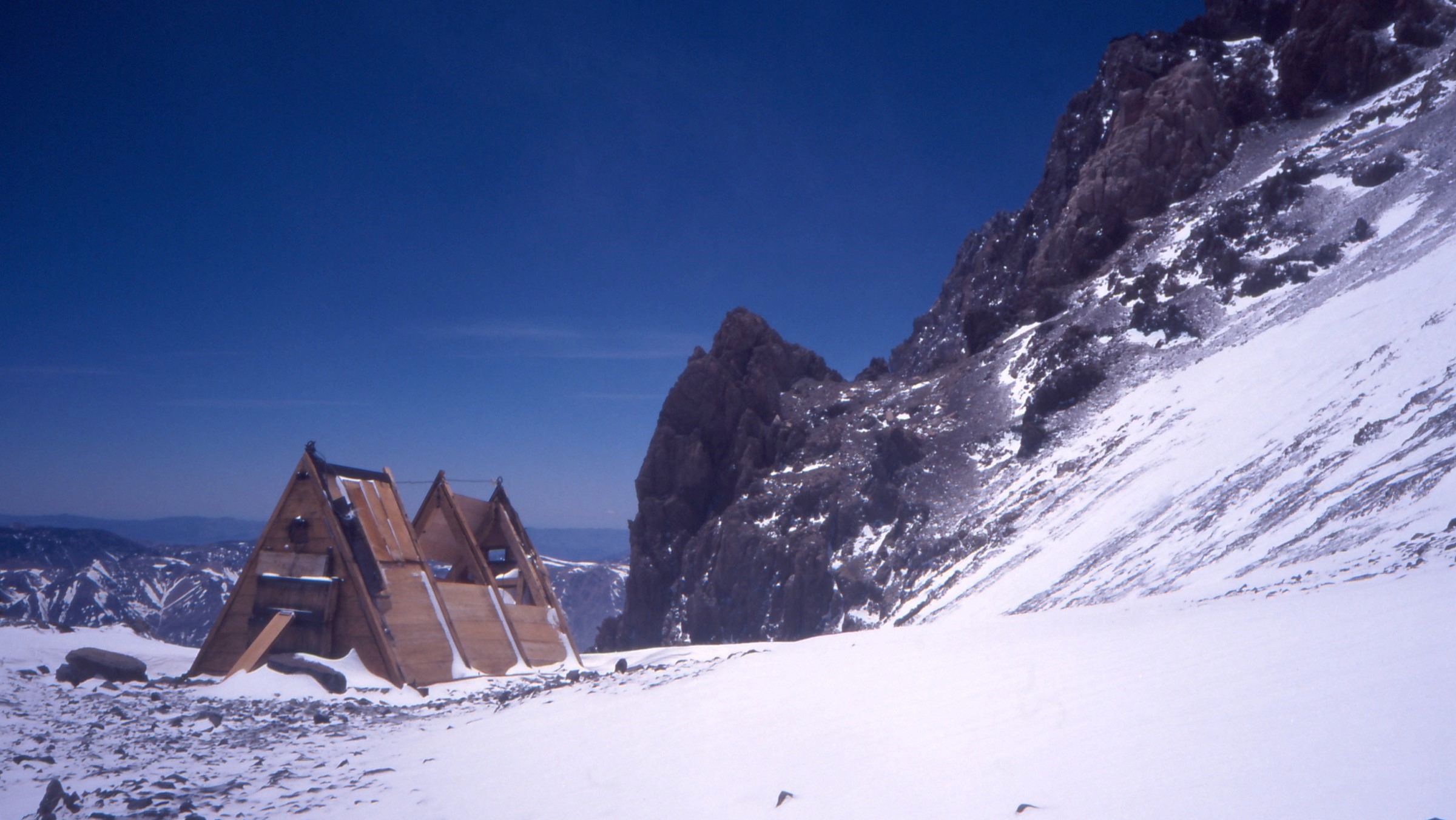
Dilapidated Independencia bivouac box on Aconcagua (December 1997, 6400 m)

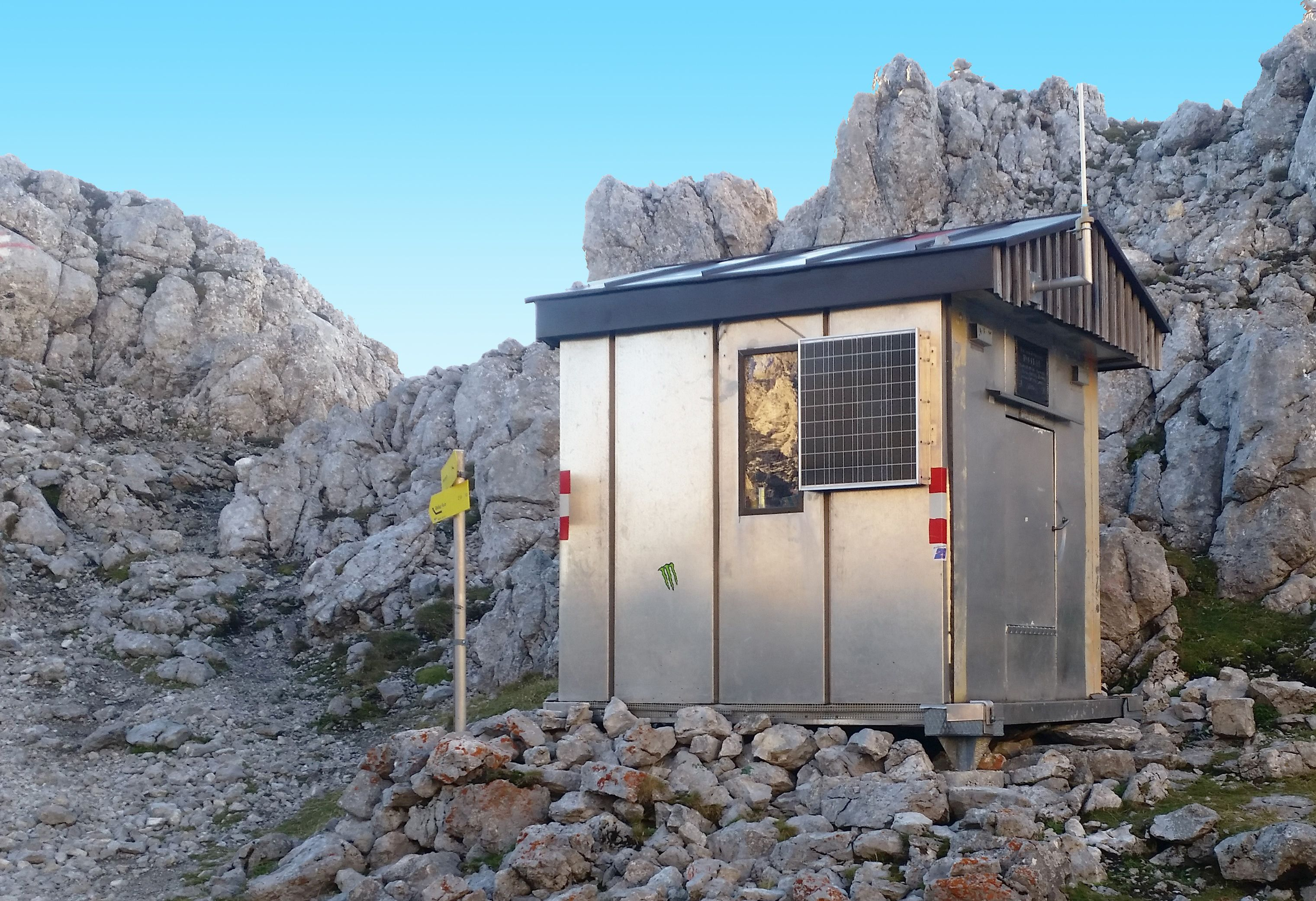
Bivouac box on Grimming (Sept. 2016)
