= Breithornzwillinge =

Mountain in Switzerland

- Breithorn Twins
- Location within Alps

Highest point
- Peak: western Breithorn Twin
- Elevation: 4,139 m (13,579 ft)
- Prominence: 117
- Parent peak: Breithorn (Western Summit)
- Coordinates: 45°56′14″N 7°46′02″E

Naming
- Native name: Breithornzwillinge (German)

Geography
- Countries: Switzerland and Italy
- Canton/Region: Valais and Aosta Valley
- Parent range: Pennine Alps

The Breithorn Twins (German: Breithornzwillinge) are twin peaks of the Breithorn range of the Pennine Alps, located on the border between Switzerland and Italy, between the canton of Valais and the region of Aosta Valley. They are located east of the Theodul Pass.

The twin peaks are called Eastern Breithorn/western Breithorn Twin (4,139 m) and Gendarm/eastern Breithorn Twin (4,109 m). They are about 115 m (377 ft) apart.
