= Gobba di Rollin =

Mountain in the Pennine Alps between Switzerland and Italy

Gobba di Rollin Dos de Rollin
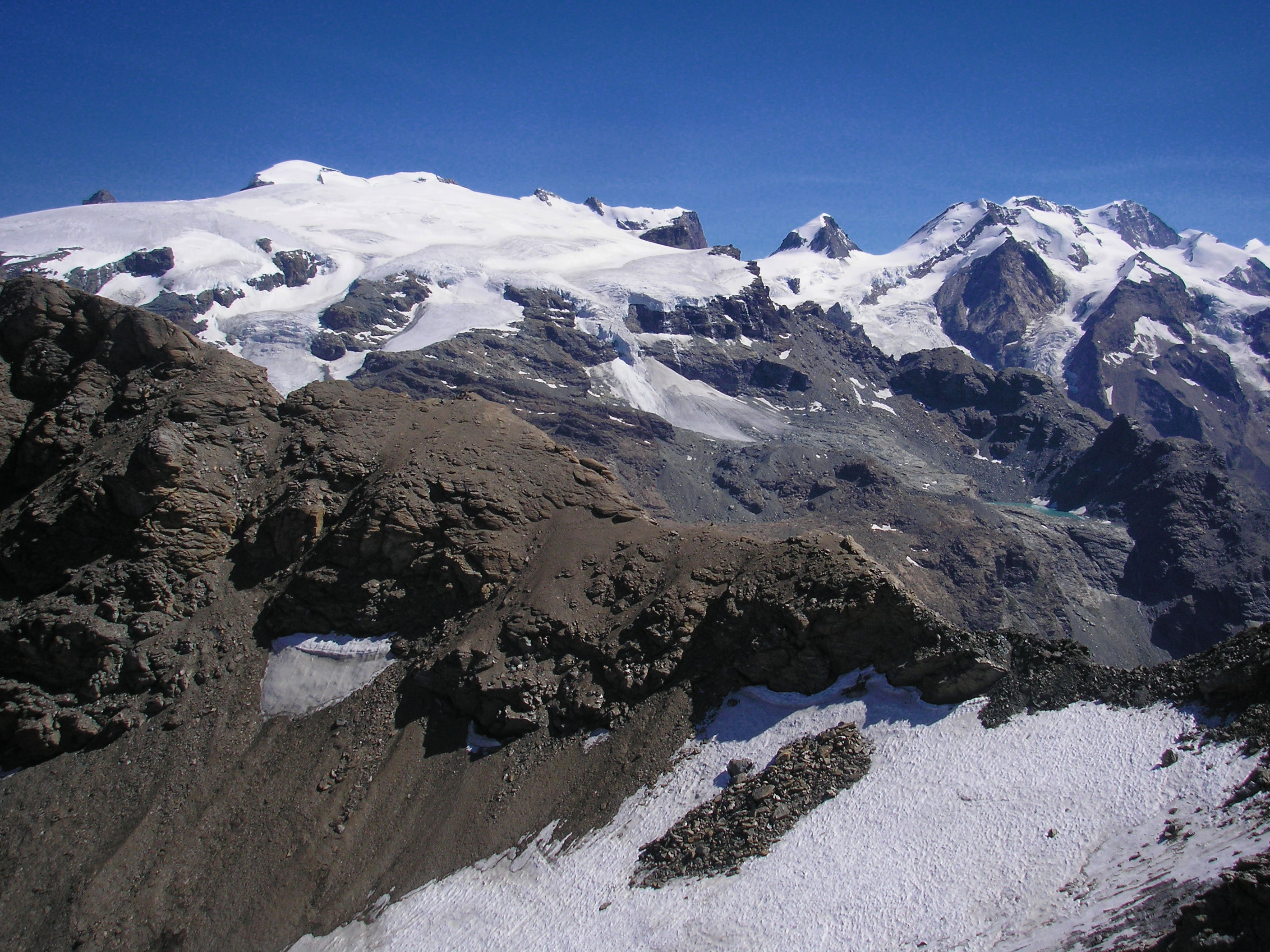
- Gobba di Rollin (left) and the Lyskamm group (right) from the south

Highest point
- Elevation: 3,898 m (12,789 ft)
- Prominence: 88 m (289 ft)
- Parent peak: Breithorn
- Coordinates: 45°55′27″N 7°44′04″E

Geography
- Location within Alps
- Location: Zermatt, Valais, Switzerland / Ayas, Aosta Valley, Italy
- Parent range: Pennine Alps

Climbing
- Easiest route: From Klein Matterhorn

Gobba di Rollin (Italian, French: Dos de Rollin; 3,898 m) is a mountain of the Pennine Alps, straddling the border between Switzerland and Italy. It is located south of the Breithorn and it is largely covered by ice, the summit area being particularly flat. On the north side is the Breithorn Plateau of the Theodul Glacier, on the east side is the Verraz Glacier and on the south is the Glacier d'Aventine.

Gobba di Rollin is notable as having the highest ski lift in Europe on its top, since it is the highest point of the ski area Matterhorn Glacier Paradise on the Theodul Glacier, between Zermatt and Breuil-Cervinia. It is connected to both the Klein Matterhorn and Testa Grigia by ski lifts. The shortest access is from the Klein Matterhorn station (3,820 m), less than two kilometres away, from where it can be easily reached by a piste on the glacier. The summit has even been reached via the Theodul Pass by 4x4 vehicles, a European record.
