= Theodul Glacier =

Glacier of the Alps

- Theodulgletscher, Glacier du Théodule
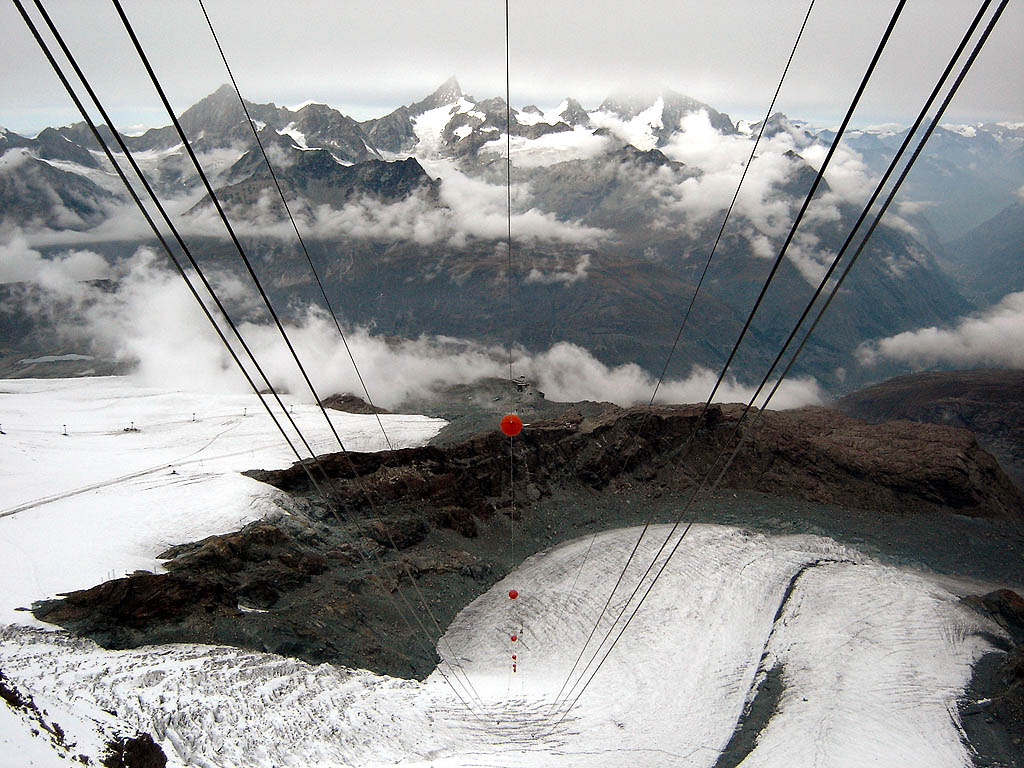
- The Upper Theodul Glacier (left) and the Lower Theodul Glacier (right) from the Klein Matterhorn cable car

- Location within Switzerland Location within Canton of Valais Location within Alps
- Location: Valais, Switzerland
- Coordinates: 45°56′40″N 07°43′00″E
- Terminus: 2,500 metres (8,202 ft)
- Status: Retreating

The Theodul Glacier (also spelled Theodule Glacier; German: Theodulgletscher, French: Glacier du Théodule, Italian: Ghiacciaio del Teodulo) is a glacier of the Alps, located south of Zermatt in the canton of Valais. It lies on the Swiss side of the Pennine Alps, although its upper basin touches the Italian region of the Aosta Valley. The glacier descends from the west side of the Breithorn (4,164 metres (13,661 ft)) and splits into two diverging branches above Gandegg: the Upper Theodul Glacier (Oberer Theodulgletscher), spilling on a high plateau near Trockener Steg, together with the Furgg Glacier, and the Lower Theodul Glacier (Unterer Theodulgletscher), reaching a height of about 2,500 metres (8,202 ft) above the Gorner Glacier.

== Geography ==
Both branches of the Theodul Glacier are part of the Rhone basin, through the rivers Gornera, Mattervispa, and Vispa. Slightly above the glacier splitting is the Theodul Pass, crossing the border between Switzerland and Italy, and connecting Zermatt to Breuil-Cervinia. On the west, the Theodul Glacier is overlooked by the Matterhorn.

Until about 1980s the Lower Theodul Glacier was still connected to the Gorner Glacier and one of its tributaries.

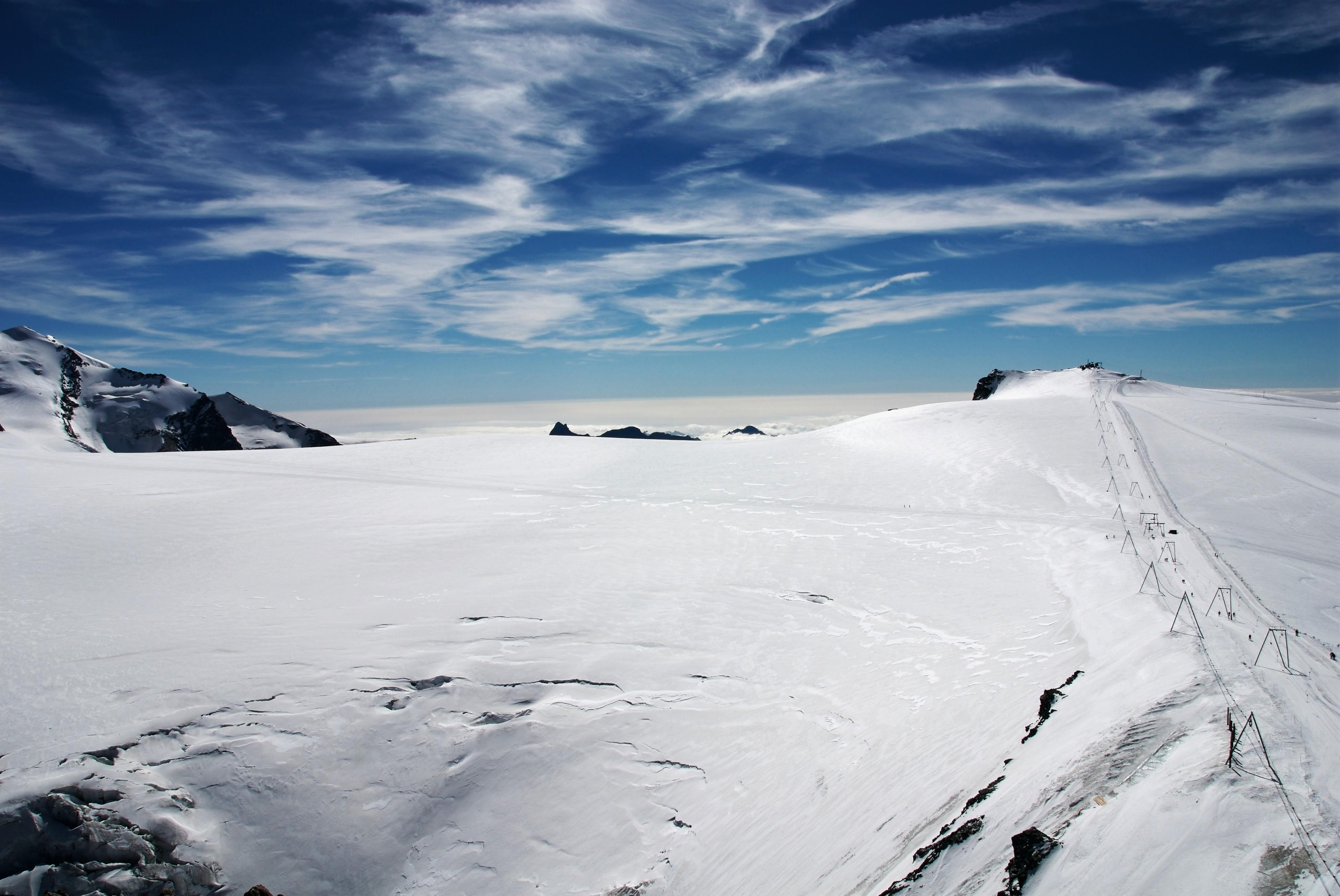

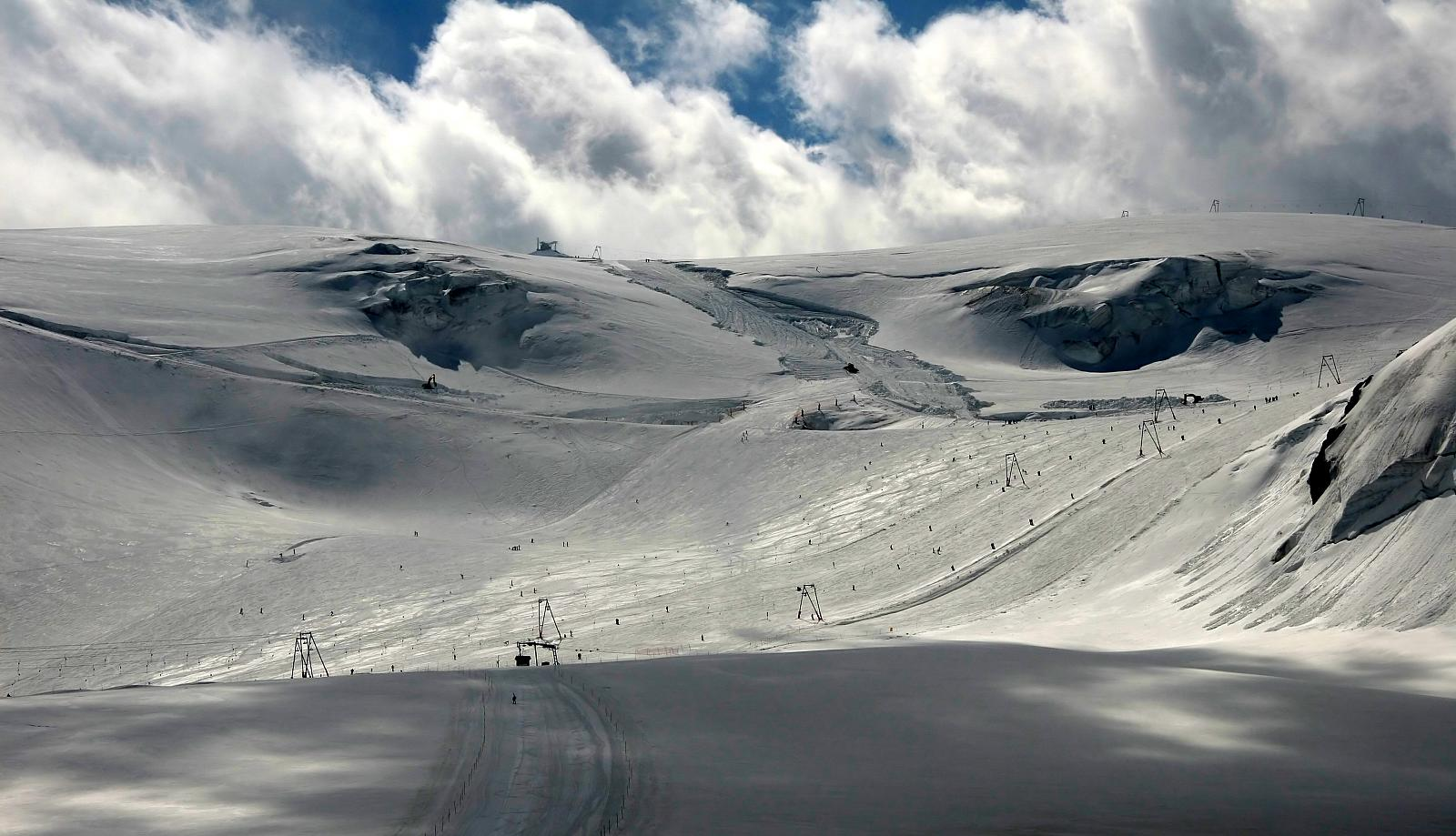
Summer views of the Breithorn Plateau (top) and the Plateau Rosa (bottom).

The upper section of the Theodul Glacier consists of a flat plateau at around 3,800 metres (12,500 ft), named Breithorn Plateau. The plateau lies between the Breithorn, the Gobba di Rollin and the Klein Matterhorn. The Breithorn Pass (3,814 metres (12,513 ft)) separates the Breithorn from the Gobba di Rollin (French: Bosse de Rollin). A 3,795 metres (12,451 ft) high saddle lies between the Gobba di Rollin and the Klein Matterhorn. Between the Klein Matterhorn and the Breithorn is a distinct glacier, named Klein Matterhorn Gletscher, which joins the Lower Theodul Glacier at about 3,000 metres (9,800 ft). The Breithorn Plateau area can be easily accessed by several cable cars connecting Zermatt to the Klein Matterhorn and since July 2023 from the Italian Testa Grigia valley station.

At around 3,500 metres (11,500 ft) is the Plateau Rosa, whose name derives from the Valdôtain patois term Rouése, meaning "ice" (as for the nearby Monte Rosa). This area lies between Testa Grigia (French: Tête grise) (3,479 metres (11,414 ft)) and the Klein Matterhorn, south of and slightly above the Theodul Pass. Southeast of Testa Grigia is a saddle named Passo di Ventina Nord (3,445 metres (11,302 ft)). This area can also be easily accessed by several cable cars connecting Breuil-Cervinia to Testa Grigia.

Several lakes formed in the 1980s at the bottom of the Upper Theodul Glacier, west of Trockener Steg. The largest, named Theodulgletschersee is 7.76 ha wide and lies at an elevation of 2,851 metres (9,354 ft) above sea level. It is the highest lake over 4 ha in Switzerland and the largest lake in the Matter Valley (the valley of Zermatt). The second-largest, named Furggsee is 2.57 ha wide and lies at 2,874 metres (9,429 ft).

== Skiing ==
Most of the glacier is part of the year-round ski area marketed as Matterhorn Glacier Paradise. It is the highest in Europe and largest summer ski area in the world, with 21 kilometres of prepared pistes.

The culminating point is on the summit of Gobba di Rollin and the lowest is above Trockener Steg. The Matterhorn Glacier Paradise links the ski areas of Zermatt and Breuil-Cervina. Ski lifts connect Trockener Steg, Theodul Pass, Testa Grigia, Klein Matterhorn and Gobba di Rollin. A chair lift also connects Trockener Steg to the Furggsattel (3,349 m), north of the Theodul Pass. The highest cable car was built in 1979.

== Climate ==
The Theodul Glacier has an alpine climate (Koppen: ET)

Climate data for Plateau Rosa (elev. 3488 m), 1981-2010 normals
| Month | Jan | Feb | Mar | Apr | May | Jun | Jul | Aug | Sep | Oct | Nov | Dec | Year |
|---|---|---|---|---|---|---|---|---|---|---|---|---|---|
| Record high °C (°F) | 6.0 (42.8) | 9.0 (48.2) | 6.3 (43.3) | 8.4 (47.1) | 11.4 (52.5) | 12.6 (54.7) | 18.8 (65.8) | 12.8 (55.0) | 15.3 (59.5) | 9.0 (48.2) | 6.4 (43.5) | 5.4 (41.7) | 18.8 (65.8) |
| Mean daily maximum °C (°F) | −8.9 (16.0) | −8.9 (16.0) | −8.1 (17.4) | −5.3 (22.5) | −1.4 (29.5) | 1.6 (34.9) | 4.9 (40.8) | 3.6 (38.5) | 1.6 (34.9) | −1.0 (30.2) | −5.9 (21.4) | −8.0 (17.6) | −3.0 (26.6) |
| Daily mean °C (°F) | −11.0 (12.2) | −11.4 (11.5) | −10.8 (12.6) | −7.9 (17.8) | −4.2 (24.4) | −1.0 (30.2) | 2.1 (35.8) | 1.2 (34.2) | −0.3 (31.5) | −3.0 (26.6) | −8.0 (17.6) | −10.1 (13.8) | −5.4 (22.3) |
| Mean daily minimum °C (°F) | −13.7 (7.3) | −14.1 (6.6) | −13.6 (7.5) | −10.7 (12.7) | −6.9 (19.6) | −3.7 (25.3) | −0.9 (30.4) | −1.1 (30.0) | −2.5 (27.5) | −5.1 (22.8) | −10.4 (13.3) | −12.6 (9.3) | −7.9 (17.7) |
| Record low °C (°F) | −29.2 (−20.6) | −30.0 (−22.0) | −35.0 (−31.0) | −25.0 (−13.0) | −19.0 (−2.2) | −15.8 (3.6) | −10.0 (14.0) | −10.7 (12.7) | −13.0 (8.6) | −20.0 (−4.0) | −29.1 (−20.4) | −29.0 (−20.2) | −35.0 (−31.0) |
| Average precipitation mm (inches) | 7.0 (0.28) | 3.0 (0.12) | 7.2 (0.28) | 10.2 (0.40) | 26.7 (1.05) | 18.7 (0.74) | 19.5 (0.77) | 16.6 (0.65) | 15.6 (0.61) | 9.4 (0.37) | 8.4 (0.33) | 7.4 (0.29) | 149.7 (5.89) |
| Average precipitation days (≥ >=1 mm) | 1.27 | 0.88 | 1.90 | 2.77 | 5.73 | 4.07 | 3.69 | 3.05 | 3.45 | 1.57 | 2.18 | 1.40 | 31.96 |
| Mean monthly sunshine hours | 130.0 | 157.3 | 157.3 | 163.0 | 152.6 | 193.6 | 248.6 | 198.5 | 184.3 | 174.8 | 121.4 | 119.4 | 2,000.8 |
Source 1: "Meteo Climat (extremes)".
Source 2: "Meteo Climat (1981-2010 normals)".
