= Horace Bénédict de Saussure =

Genevan scientist and mountaineer (1740–1799)

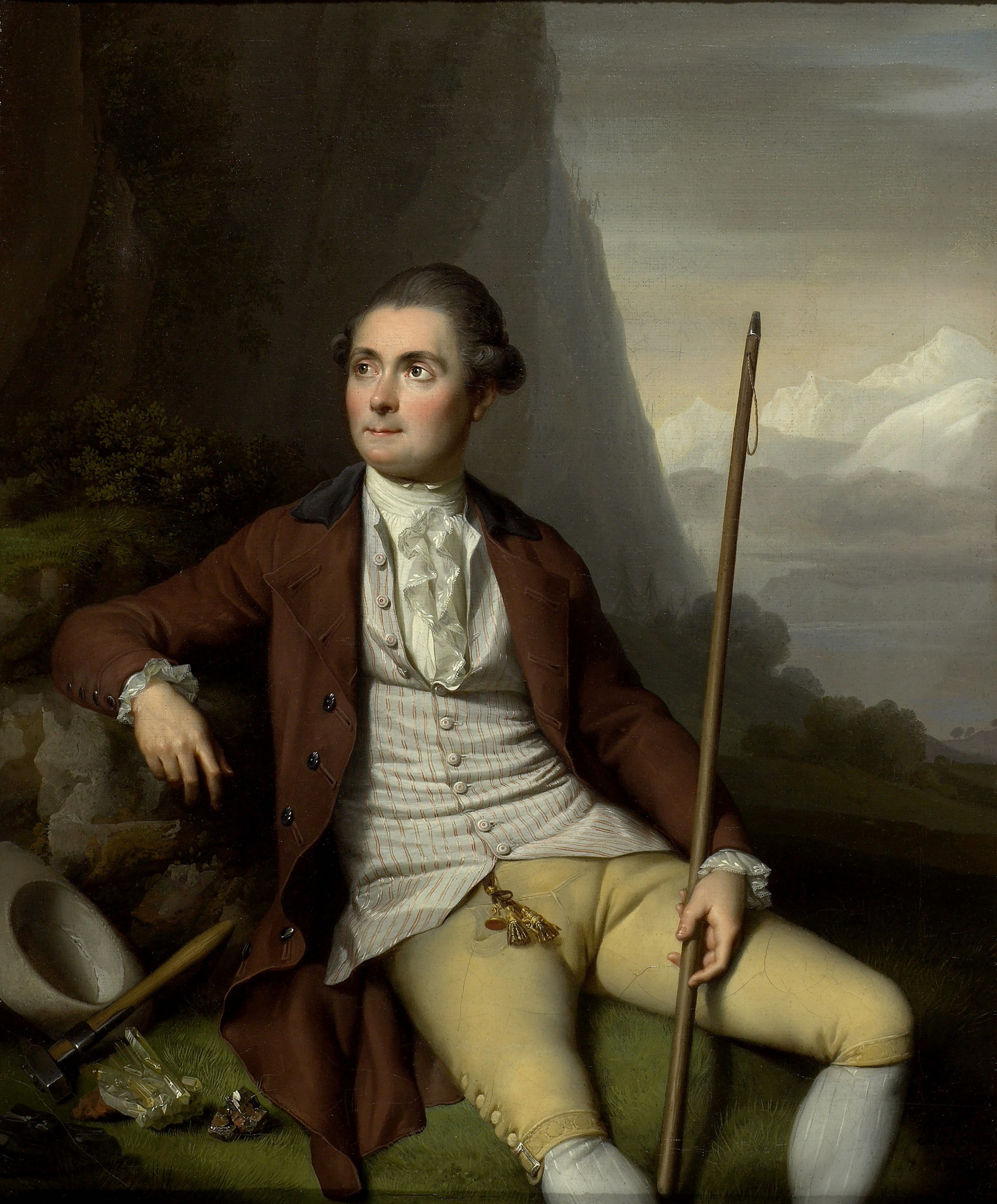
- Portrait of Horace Bénédict de Saussure (after the picture by Juel, in the Library at Geneva)
- Born: 17 February 1740; Conches, Republic of Geneva
- Died: 22 January 1799 (aged 58); Geneva, Léman, France
- Education: College in Conches, "Academy of Geneva" (1762)
- Known for: See list: alpinism; glaciology; Anemometer; solar cooker; cyanometer; Electrometer; hygrometer
- Children: Nicolas-Théodore de Saussure; Albertine Necker de Saussure
- Awards: Royal Swedish Academy of Sciences (1784),Royal Society of London (1788), l'Académie des sciences de Paris (1791)
- Scientific career
- Fields: Botany, Meteorology, Geology, Physics
- Workplaces: University of Geneva (1762–1786)

Horace Bénédict de Saussure (French: [ɔʁas benedikt də sosyʁ]; 17 February 1740 – 22 January 1799) was a Genevan geologist, meteorologist, physicist, mountaineer and Alpine explorer (specifically the Mont Blanc massif), often called the founder of alpinism and modern meteorology, and considered to be the first person to build a successful solar oven.

== Early life and education ==
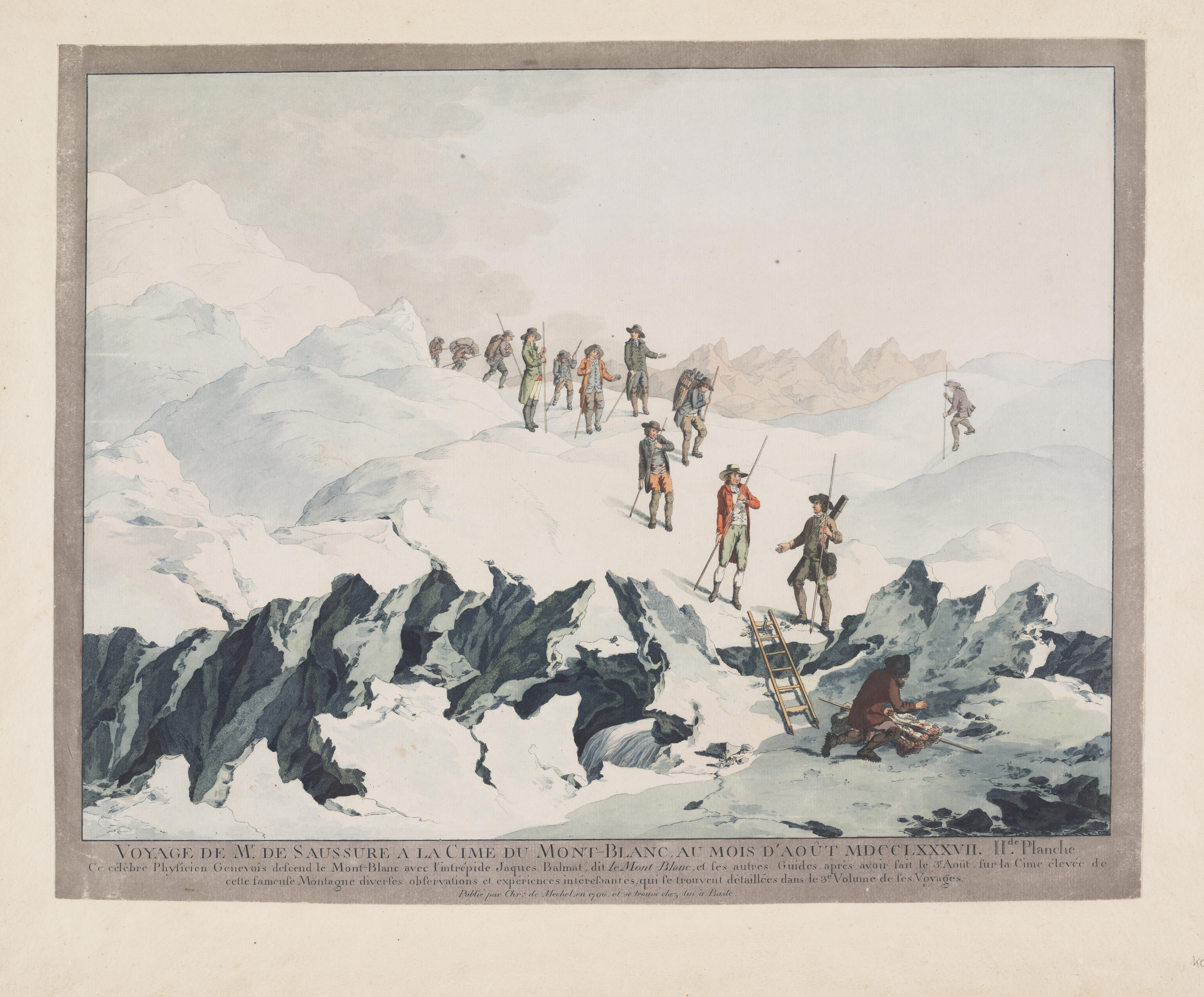
Christian von Mechel, Descent from Mont-Blanc in 1787 by H.B. de Saussure, copper engraving; collection of Teylers Museum, Haarlem

Horace Bénédict de Saussure was born 17 February 1740, in Conches, near Geneva, in the Republic of Geneva. Saussure's family were Genevan patricians. His father, Nicolas de Saussure, was an agriculturist, agronomist and author. Because his mother was "sickly", Saussure was brought up by his mother's sister and her husband the Genevan naturalist Charles Bonnet, who sparked Horace-Bénédict's early interest in botany. After attending the "Collège" of his hometown, he completed his studies at the Geneva Academy in 1759 with a dissertation on heat (Dissertatio physica de igne).

== Career ==
In 1760, Saussure made the first of numerous trips to Chamonix valley, to collect plant specimens for the noted Swiss anatomist, physiologist and botanist Albrecht von Haller. In 1760, Saussure offered a reward to the first man to reach the summit of Mont Blanc. Inspired by his uncle, Charles Bonnet, the young Saussure researched the physiology of plants which he published as Observations sur l'écorce des feuilles et des pétales in 1762.

The same year, at 22, he was elected professor of philosophy at the "Academy of Geneva", where he lectured on physics one year, and on logic and metaphysics the next. He taught there until 1786, occasionally also lecturing on geography, geology, chemistry, and even astronomy.

Saussure's early interest in botanical studies and glaciers soon led him to undertake other journeys across the Alps. In 1767, he completed his first tour of Mont Blanc, a trip that did much to reveal the topography of the snowy portions of the Alps of Savoy. He also carried out experiments on heat and cold, on the weight of the atmosphere and on electricity and magnetism. For this, he devised what became one of the first electrometers. From 1772 to 1773 trips led him to Italy, where he studied Mount Etna and other volcanoes (1772–73), and to the extinct volcanoes of the Auvergne, in France.

Although a patrician, Saussure held liberal views, which induced him to present in 1774 a plan for the development of scientific education in the Geneva College, which would be open to all citizens, but this attempt failed. He was more successful in advocating the creation of the "Société des Arts" (1776), inspired by the London Society for the Improvement of Arts.

Beginning in 1774, Saussure sought to reach the summit of Mont Blanc on the side of Val Veny (now Italy) accompanied by the Courmayeur alpine guide Jean-Laurent Jordaney on the Miage Glacier and on Mont Crammont. In 1776, he ascended the Buet (3,096 m). He climbed the Crammont in 1774 and again in 1778, in which year he also explored the Valsorey glacier, near the Great St Bernard. In 1780, he climbed the Roche Michel, above the Mont Cenis Pass. In 1785, he made an unsuccessful attempt on Mont Blanc by the Aiguille du Goûter route. Two Chamonix men, Michel Paccard and Jacques Balmat, attained the summit in 1786, by way of the Grands Mulets, and in 1787 Saussure himself made the third ascent of the mountain. His achievements did much to attract tourists to places such as Chamonix.

In 1788, Saussure spent 17 days making meteorological observations and physical measurements on the Col du Géant (3,371 m).

In 1789, Saussure climbed the Pizzo Bianco near Macugnaga, to observe the east wall of Monte Rosa, and crossed the Theodulpass (3,322 m) to Zermatt, as the first traveler to visit. On that occasion he climbed from the pass up the Klein Matterhorn (3,883 m). In 1792, he spent three days making observations on the same pass without descending to Zermatt and then visited the Theodulhorn (3,472 m).

=== Inventions ===
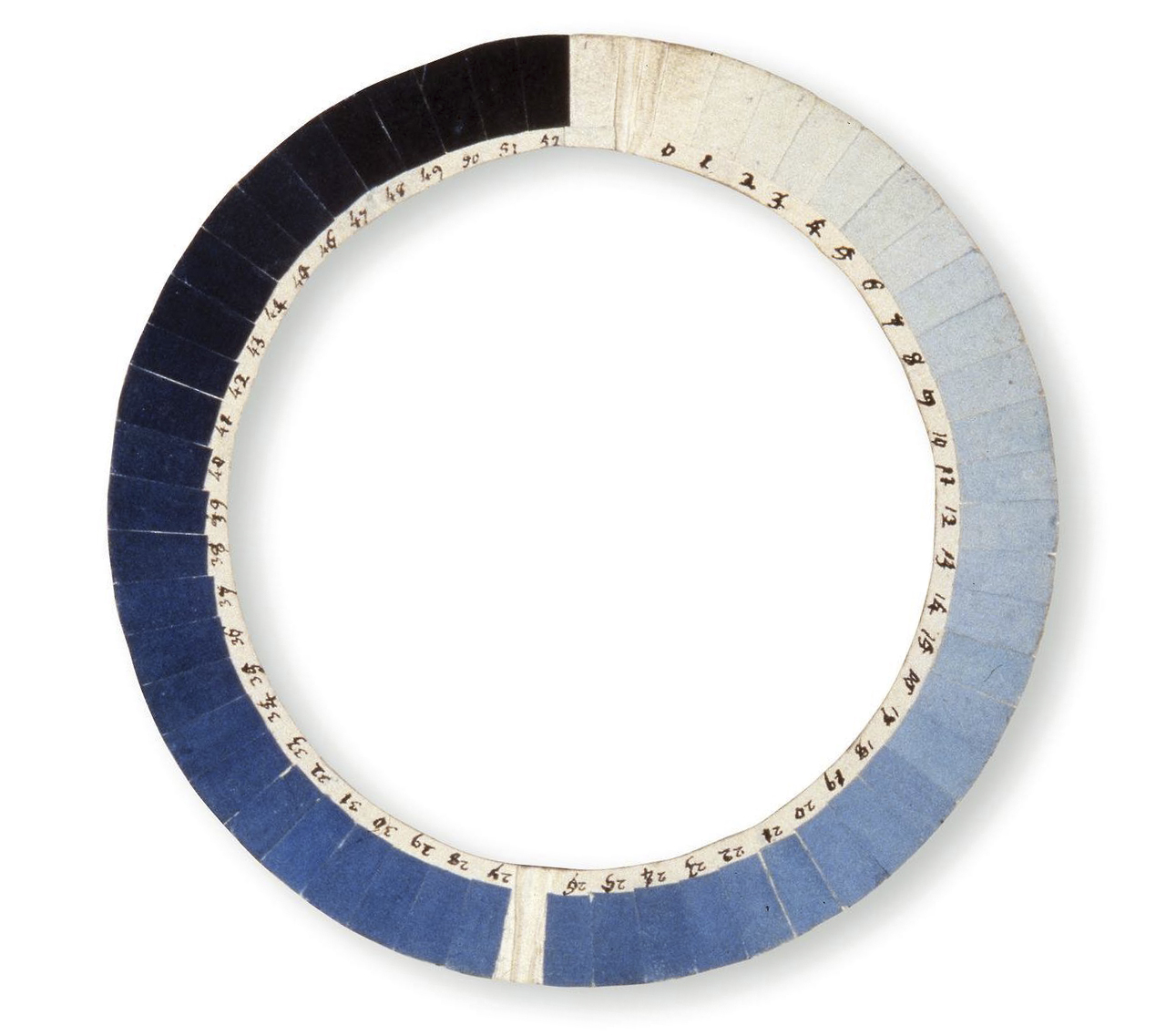
Cyanometer, Musée d'histoire des sciences de la Ville de Genève

Obsessed by the measurement of meteorological phenomena, Saussure invented and improved many kinds of apparatus, including the magnetometer,

He invented the cyanometer for estimating the blueness of the sky, the diaphanometer for judging the clarity of the atmosphere, the anemometer and the mountain eudiometer.

Of particular importance was a hair hygrometer that he devised and used for a series of investigations on atmospheric humidity, evaporation, clouds, fogs and rain (Essais sur l'Hygrométrie, 1783). This instrument sparked a bitter controversy with Jean-André Deluc, who had invented a whalebone hygrometer.

In 1767, Saussure constructed the first known Western solar oven, trying several designs before determining that a well-insulated box with three layers of glass to trap outgoing thermal radiation produced the most heat. The highest temperature he reached was 230 °F (110 °C), which he found did not vary significantly when the box was carried from the top of Mont Crammont in the Swiss Alps down to the Plains of Cournier, 4,852 feet lower in altitude and 34 °F (19 °C) warmer in temperature, thereby establishing that the external air temperature played no significant role in this solar heating effect.

Instruments invented by Saussure
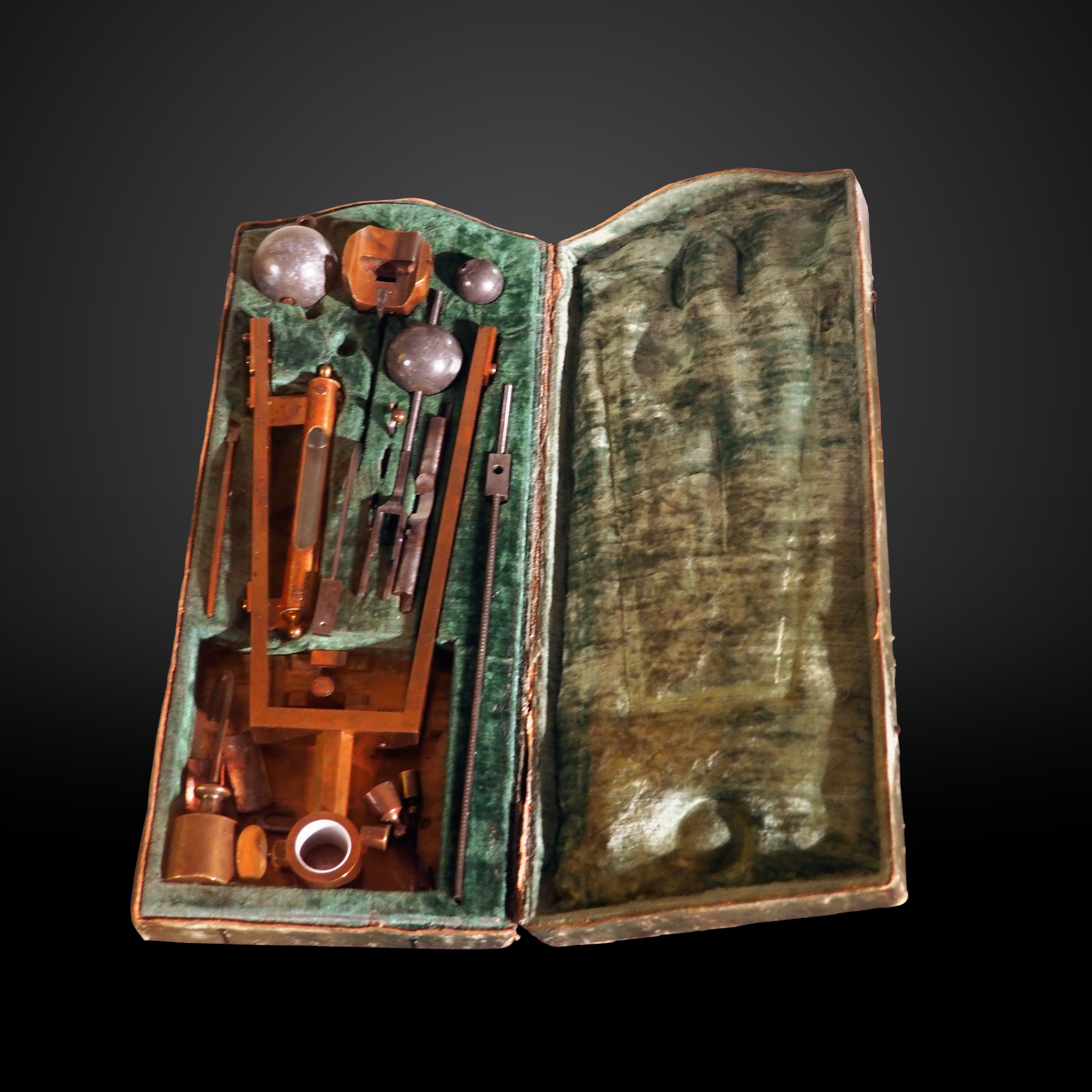
Anemometer: a metal plate catches the wind and weight keep it still; their mass measure the strength of the wind,MHS Geneva)

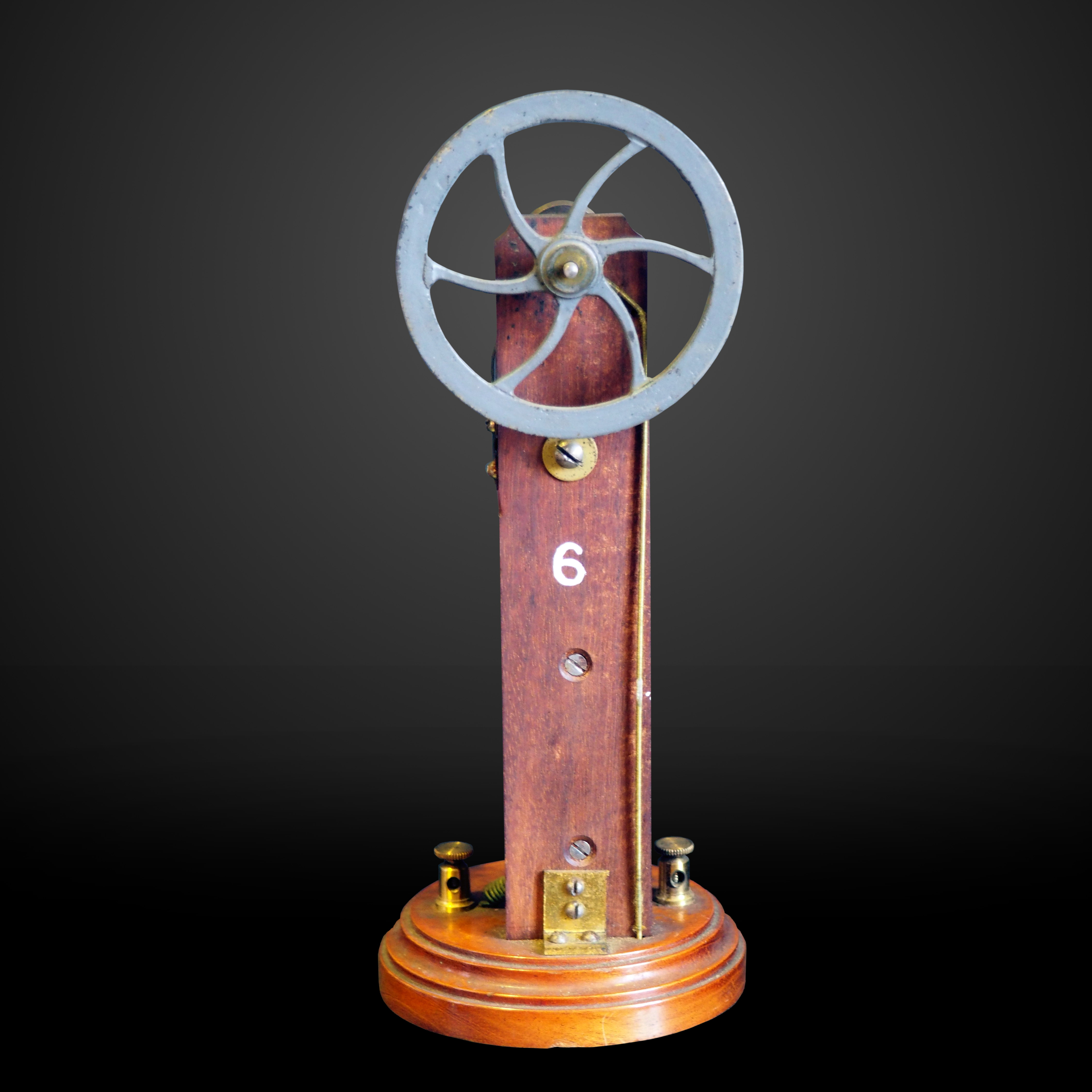
Electrometer

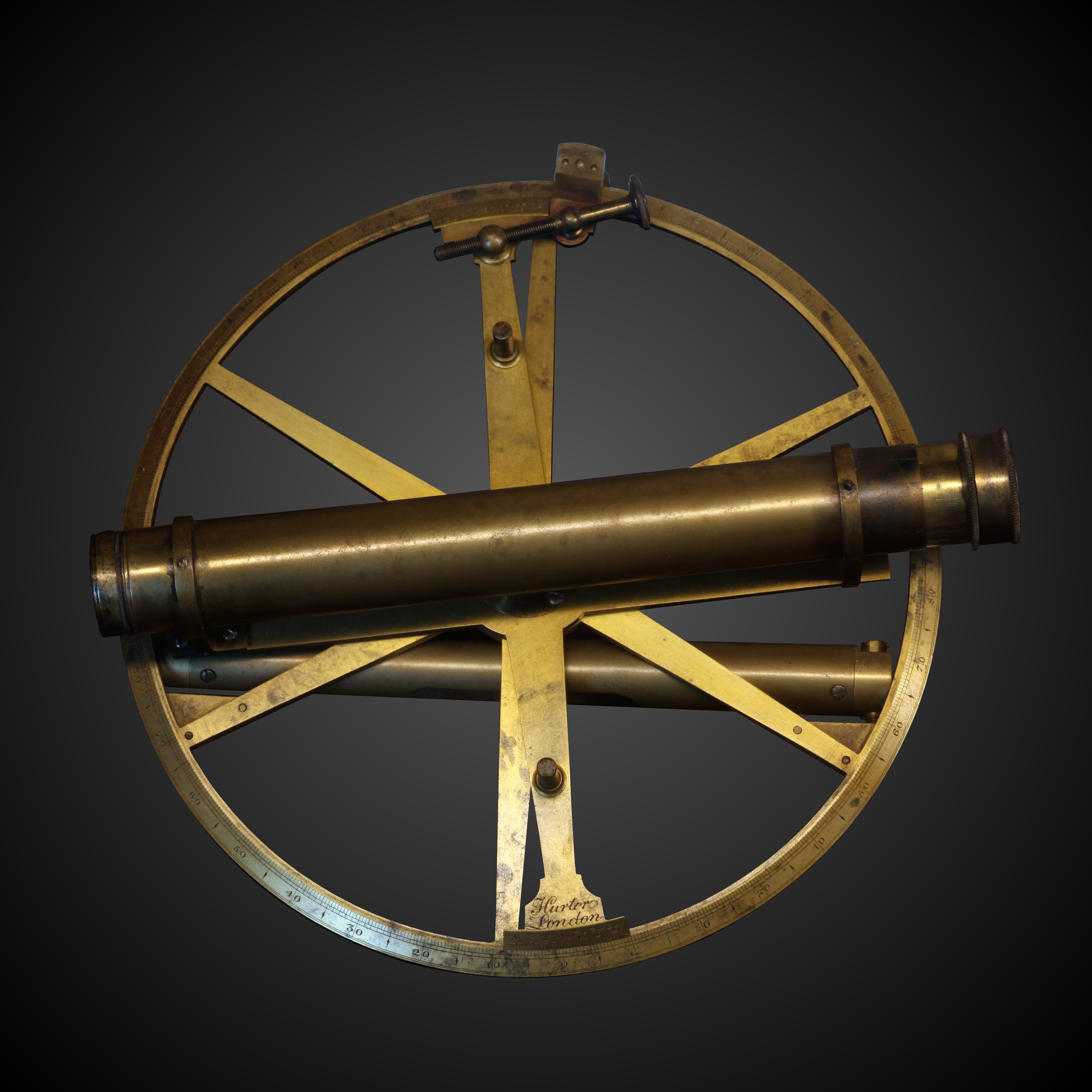
Saussure's repeating circle, on display at the Musée d'histoire des sciences de la Ville de Genève

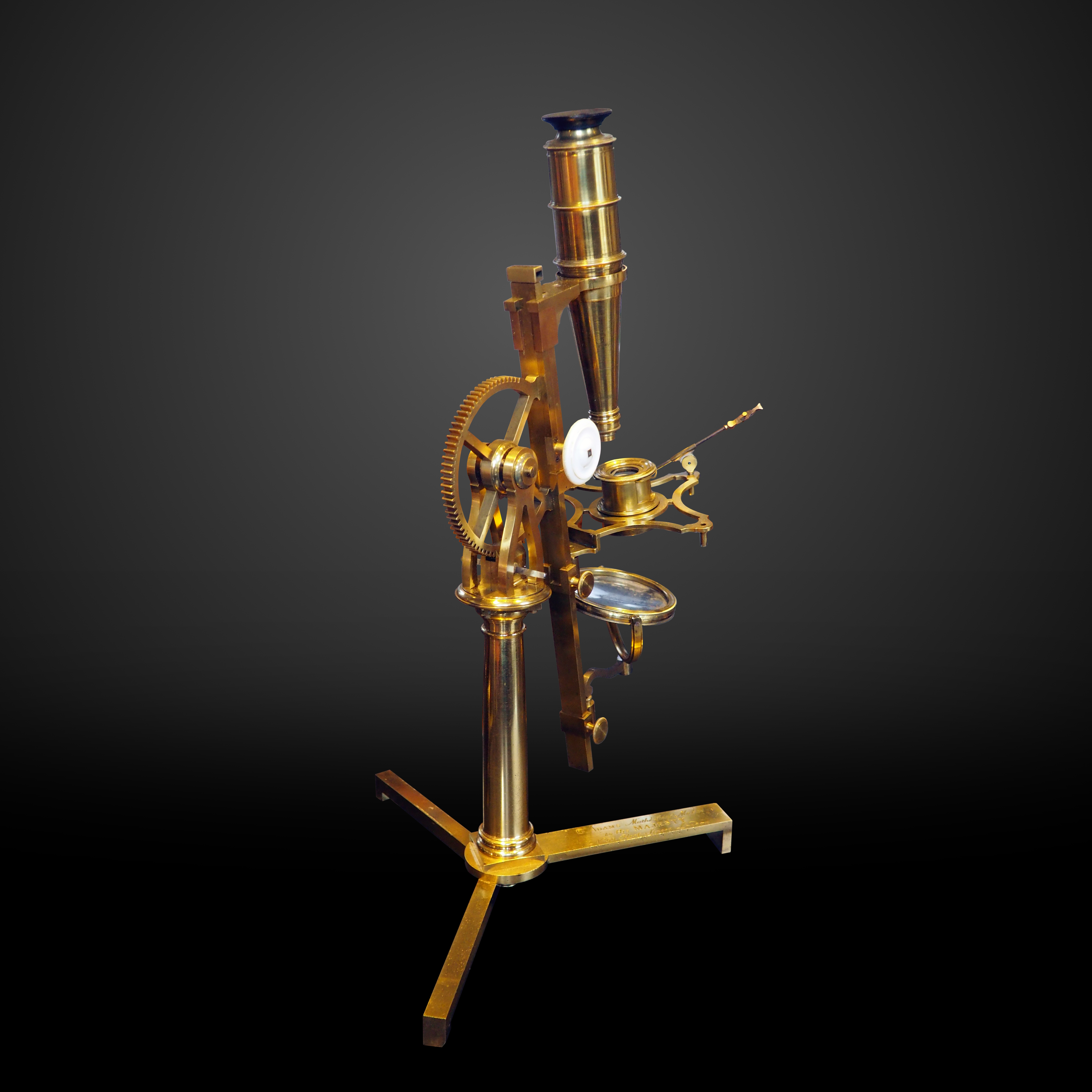
Compound microscope made for Saussure by Adams, on display at Musée d'histoire des sciences de la Ville de Genève

=== Work ===
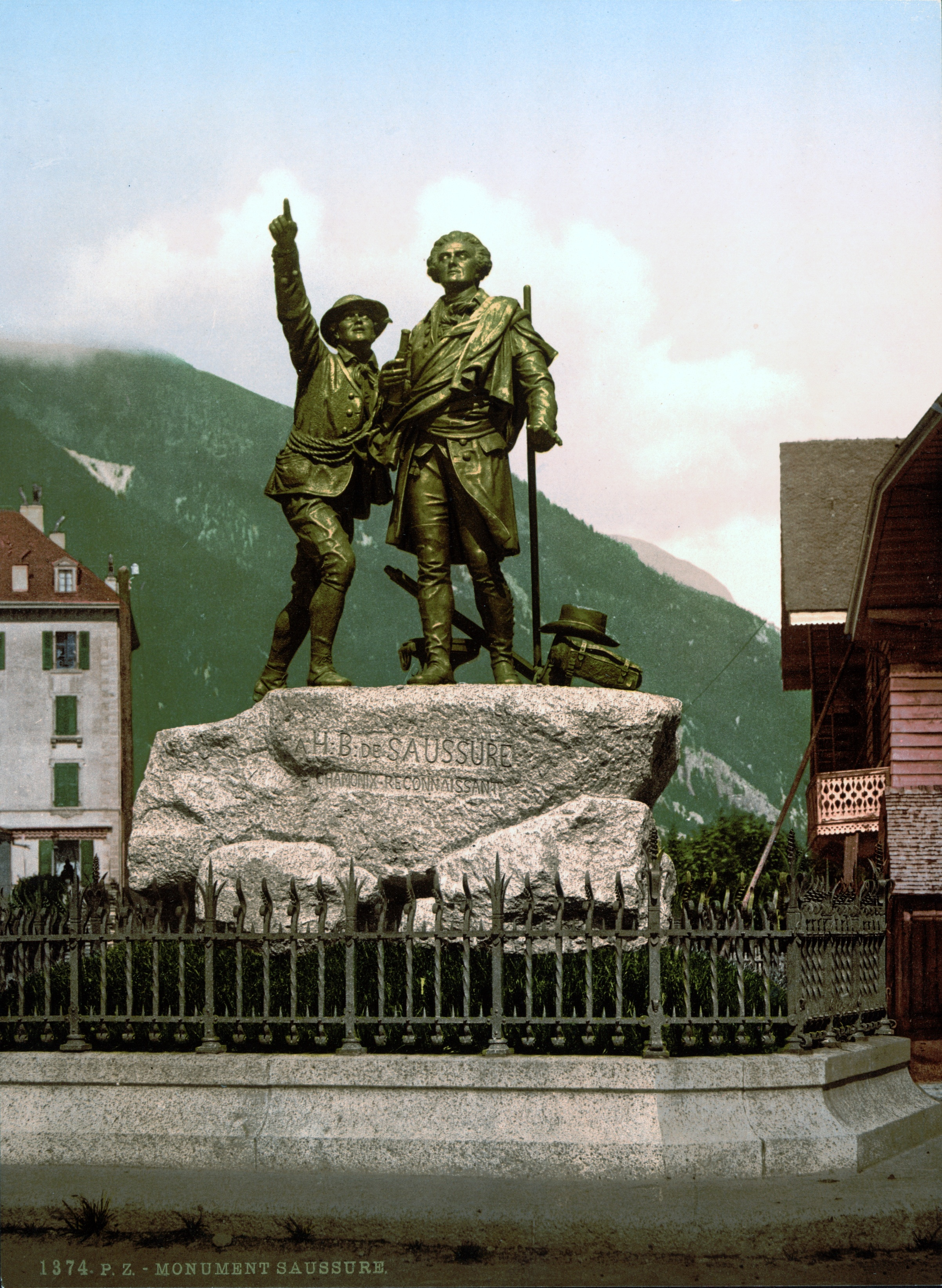
Horace-Bénédict de Saussure monument at Chamonix. Beside him is Jacques Balmat.

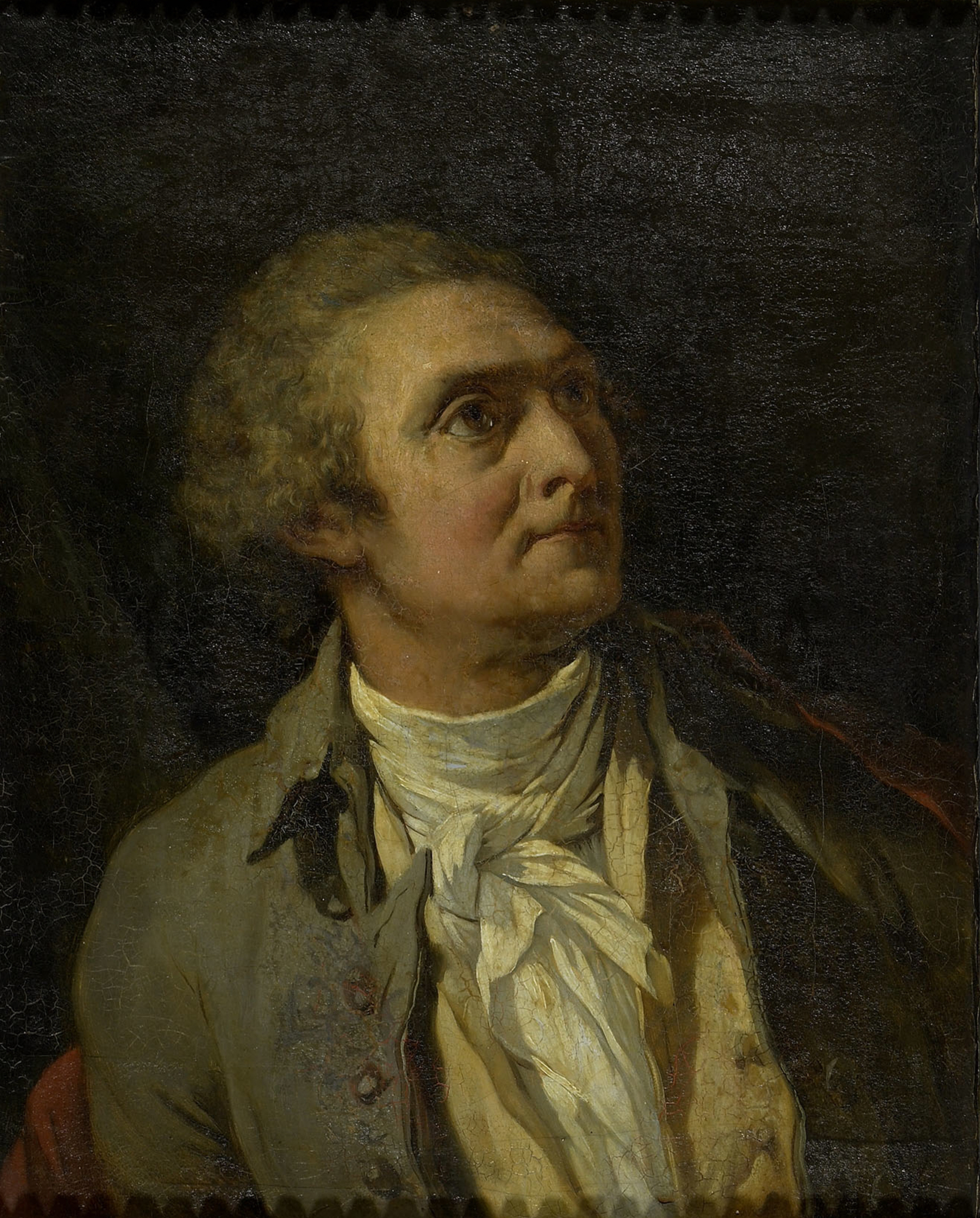
Portrait of Horace Bénédict de Saussure by Jean-Pierre Saint-Ours (c. 1790)

All of Saussure's observations and experiments from seven Alpine journeys were summed up and published in four quarto volumes, under the general title of Voyages dans les Alpes (1779 – 1796) (There was an octavo issue in eight volumes, issued from 1780 to 1796). The non-scientific portions of the work were first published in 1834, and often since, as Partie pittoresque des ouvrages de M. de Saussure.

The Alps were the focus of Saussure's investigations. He saw them as the grand key to the true theory of the earth, and they gave him the opportunity to study geology in a manner never previously attempted. Saussure closely examined the inclination of the strata, the nature of the rocks, the fossils and the minerals.

Saussure had a thorough knowledge of the chemistry of the day and applied it to the study of minerals, water and air. His geological observations made him a firm believer in the Neptunian theory: He regarded all rocks and minerals as deposited from aqueous solution or suspension, and attached much importance to the study of meteorological conditions. His work with rocks, erosion, and fossils also led him to believe that the earth was much older than generally thought and formed part of the basis of Darwin's Theory of Evolution.

Saussure carried barometers and boiling-point thermometers to the summits of the highest mountains, and estimated the relative humidity of the atmosphere at different heights, its temperature, the strength of solar radiation, the composition of air and its transparency. Then, he investigated the temperature of the earth at all depths to which he could drive his thermometer staves, and the course, conditions and temperature of streams, rivers, glaciers and lakes, even of the sea.

Saussure adapted the thermometer to many purposes: for ascertaining the temperature of the air he used one with a fine bulb hung in the shade or whirled by a string, the latter form being converted into an evaporimeter by inserting its bulb into a piece of wet sponge and making it revolve in a circle of known radius, at a known rate; for experiments on the earth and in deep water he employed large thermometers wrapped in non-conducting coatings so as to render them extremely sluggish, and capable of long retaining the temperature once they had attained it.

With these instruments Saussure showed that the bottom water of deep lakes is uniformly cold at all seasons, and that seasonal changes in temperature take six months to penetrate to a depth of 30 ft. in the earth. He recognized the immense advantages to meteorology of high-level observation stations, and whenever it was practicable he arranged for simultaneous observations to be made at different altitudes for as long periods as possible.

Saussure was particularly influential as a geologist, and although his ideas on the underlying principles were often erroneous, he was instrumental in greatly advancing that science. He was an early user of the term "geology"—see the "Discours préliminaire" to volume I of his Voyages, published in 1779—though by no means its inventor as some have claimed, the English word having been used in the 1680s and its Latin counterpart "geologia" during the previous several centuries.

== Awards ==
In 1784, Saussure was elected a foreign member of the Royal Swedish Academy of Sciences; in 1788, a foreign member of the Royal Society of London; in 1791, an associate foreign member of l'Académie des sciences de Paris.

== Personal life and death ==
Saussure was married to Albertine Amelie Boissier and had three children: Albertine Necker de Saussure who was a pioneer in the education of women, Nicolas-Théodore de Saussure who became a noted specialist in plant chemistry and an early pioneer in photosynthesis research and Alphonse Jean François de Saussure.

Saussure's health began to fail in 1791, at the same time that he suffered financial losses. Saussure died in Geneva 22 January 1799.

His great-grandson Ferdinand de Saussure (1857 – 1913) was an important linguist and semiotician.

== Recognition ==
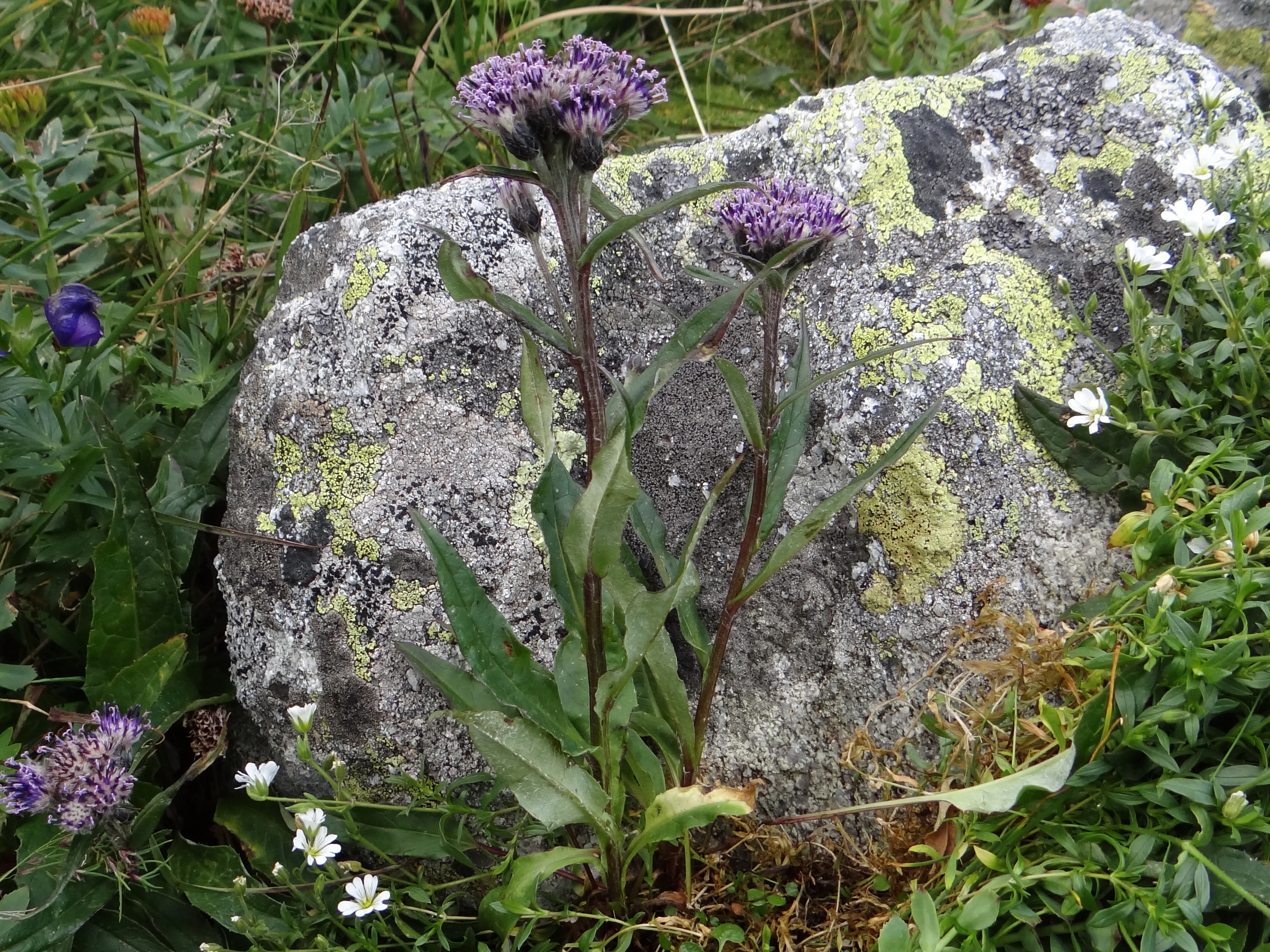
Saussurea pygmaea, from the genus named after Saussure

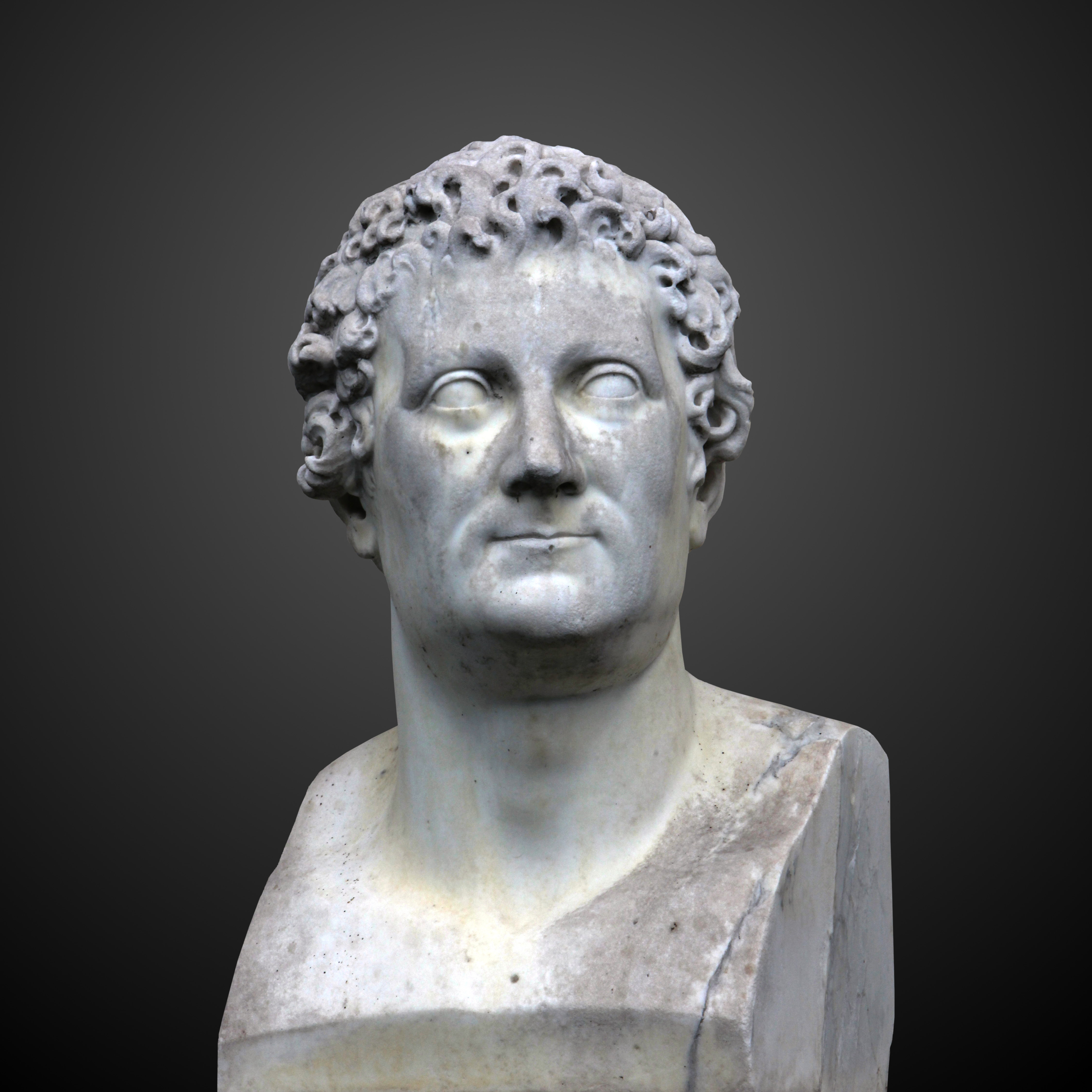
Bust of Saussure, on display on the grounds of the Conservatory and Botanical Garden of the City of Geneva.

The genus of plants Saussurea, some adapted to growing in extreme high-alpine climates, is named after him and his plant-physiologist son Nicolas-Théodore de Saussure.

The Alpine Botanical Garden Saussurea, located at Pavillon du Mont Fréty, first station for the Skyway Monte Bianco cable car, in Courmayeur, Aosta Valley, is named after him.

His work as a mineralogist was also recognized in that Saussurite is named after him.

The lunar crater Saussure is named after him.

Saussure was honoured by being depicted on the 20 Swiss franc banknote of the sixth issue of Swiss National Bank notes (1979 to 1995, when replaced by the eighth issue; the notes were recalled in 2000 and became valueless on 1 May 2020).

== Trivia ==
In his On the Fourfold Root of the Principle of Sufficient Reason, while discussing how reason affects our perception of distance, Arthur Schopenhauer includes an anecdote that Saussure, "when on the Mont Blanc,... saw so enormous a moon rise, that, not recognizing what it was, he fainted with terror".
