= Roccia =

Roccia may refer to:

- Roccia, Italy, settlement in Italy
- Roccia, subgenus of moths in the genus Jordanita
- Roccia, surname
  - Aymeric Roccia, botanist with botanical abbreviation Roccia

== See also ==
- Roccia Nera
