= Testa Grigia =

Rocky prominence above the Theodul Pass, between Italy and Switzerland

Testa Grigia / Tête grise
- Groabhopt (Walser German); Graukopf (German)
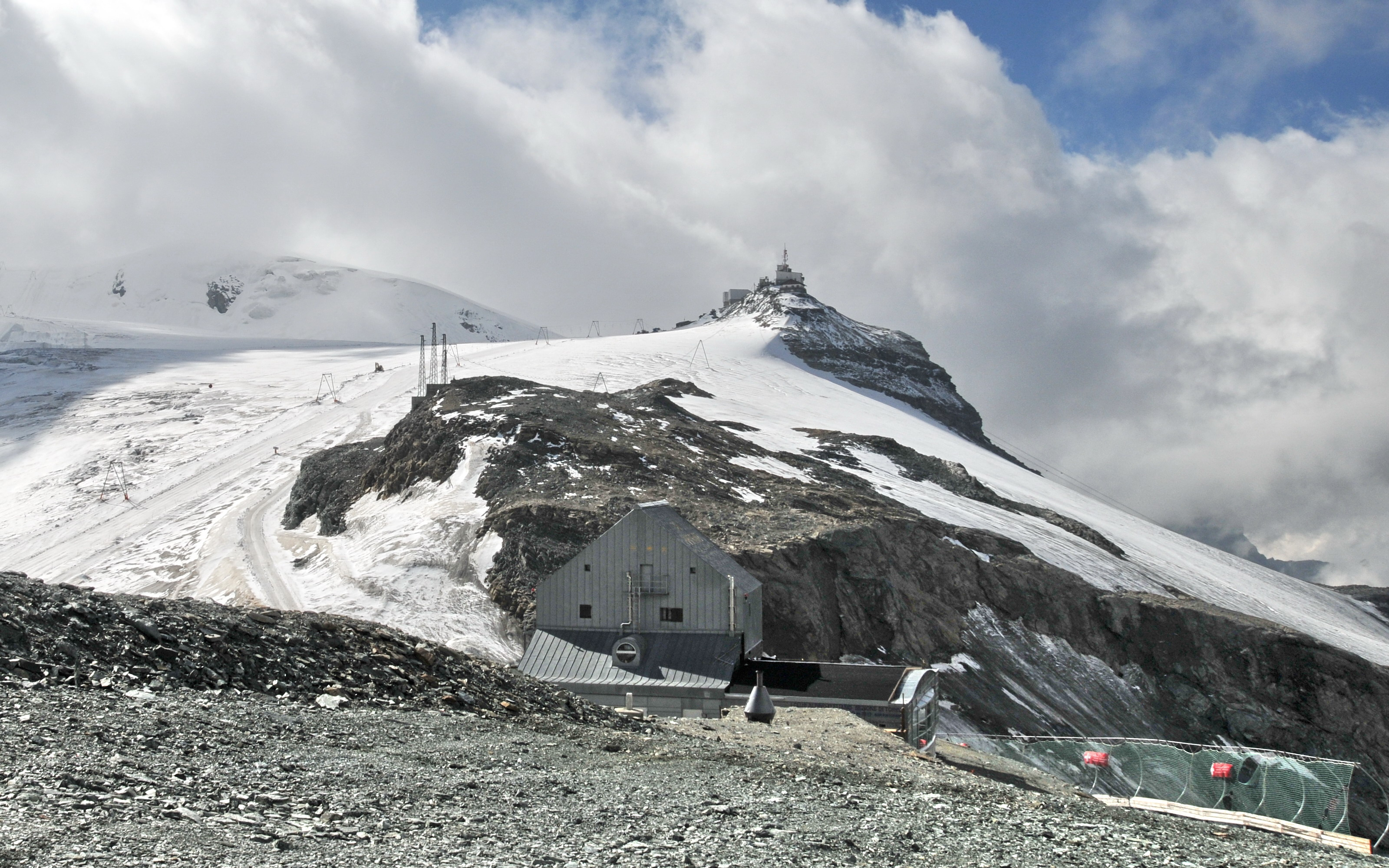
- View of Testa Grigia (centre right) from the Theodul Pass

Highest point
- Elevation: 3,479 m (11,414 ft)
- Prominence: 34 m (112 ft)
- Parent peak: Breithorn
- Listing: Alpine mountains above 3000 m
- Coordinates: 45°56′07″N 07°42′27″E

Geography
- Location within Alps
- Location: Valais, Switzerland; Aosta Valley, Italy
- Parent range: Pennine Alps

Testa Grigia (French : Tête grise, lit. "grey head") (3,479 m) is a rocky prominence above the Theodul Pass, located on the border between Italy (Aosta Valley) and Switzerland (Valais). It overlooks the Plateau Rosa section of the Theodul Glacier on its east side.

== Ascent ==
The summit can be reached from Breuil-Cervinia and is the culminating point of the Italian part of the international ski area with Zermatt. A cross-border connection with the Klein Matterhorn (3,883 m) over the Theodul Glacier was completed in July 2023.

== See also ==
- List of mountains of Switzerland accessible by public transport
- Italy–Switzerland border
