= Gendarm (Breithorn) =

Mountain in Switzerland

- eastern Breithorn Twin
- Location within Alps

Highest point
- Elevation: 4,106 m (13,471 ft)
- Prominence: 36 m (118 ft)
- Parent peak: Eastern Breithorn
- Coordinates: 45°56′09″N 7°46′14″E

Naming
- Native name: östlicher Breithornzwilling (German); Quota (Italian)

Geography
- Countries: Switzerland and Italy
- Canton/Region: Valais and Aosta Valley
- Parent range: Pennine Alps

The Gendarm (German and French (gendarme) for police officer, Italian: Quota), but also known as eastern Breithorn Twin (German: östlicher Breithornzwilling) is a peak of the Pennine Alps, located on the border between Switzerland and Italy, between the canton of Valais and the region of Aosta Valley. It is part of the Breithorn range, located east of the Theodul Pass. It is located just east of its other twin, the western Breithorn Twin, and west of the Roccia Nera.
