= Central Breithorn =

Mountain in Switzerland and Italy

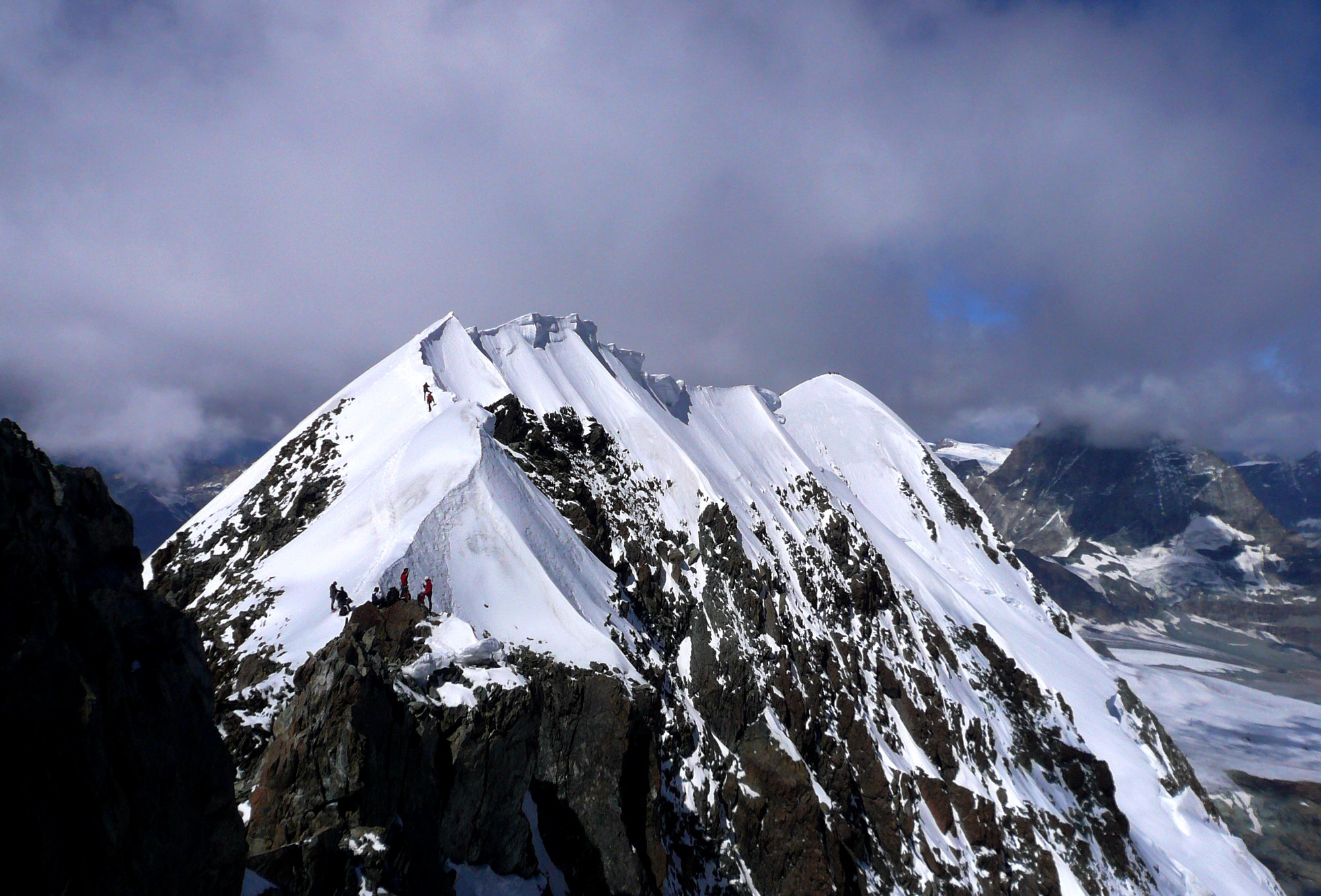
- View from the east side

Highest point
- Elevation: 4,154 m (13,629 ft)
- Prominence: 73 m (240 ft)
- Parent peak: Breithorn (Western Summit)
- Coordinates: 45°56′20″N 7°45′23″E

Naming
- Native name: Breithorn (Mittelgipfel) (German); Breithorn Centrale (Italian)

Geography
- Location within Alps
- Countries: Switzerland and Italy
- Canton/Region: Valais and Aosta Valley
- Parent range: Pennine Alps

The Central Breithorn (German: Breithorn (Mittelgipfel), Italian: Breithorn Centrale) is a peak of the Breithorn range in the Pennine Alps, located on the border between Switzerland and Italy, between the canton of Valais and the region of Aosta Valley. It is located east of the main summit of the Breithorn and west of the western Breithorn Twin.
