= Roccia Nera =

Mountain in Switzerland

- French: Roche noire German: Schwarzfluh
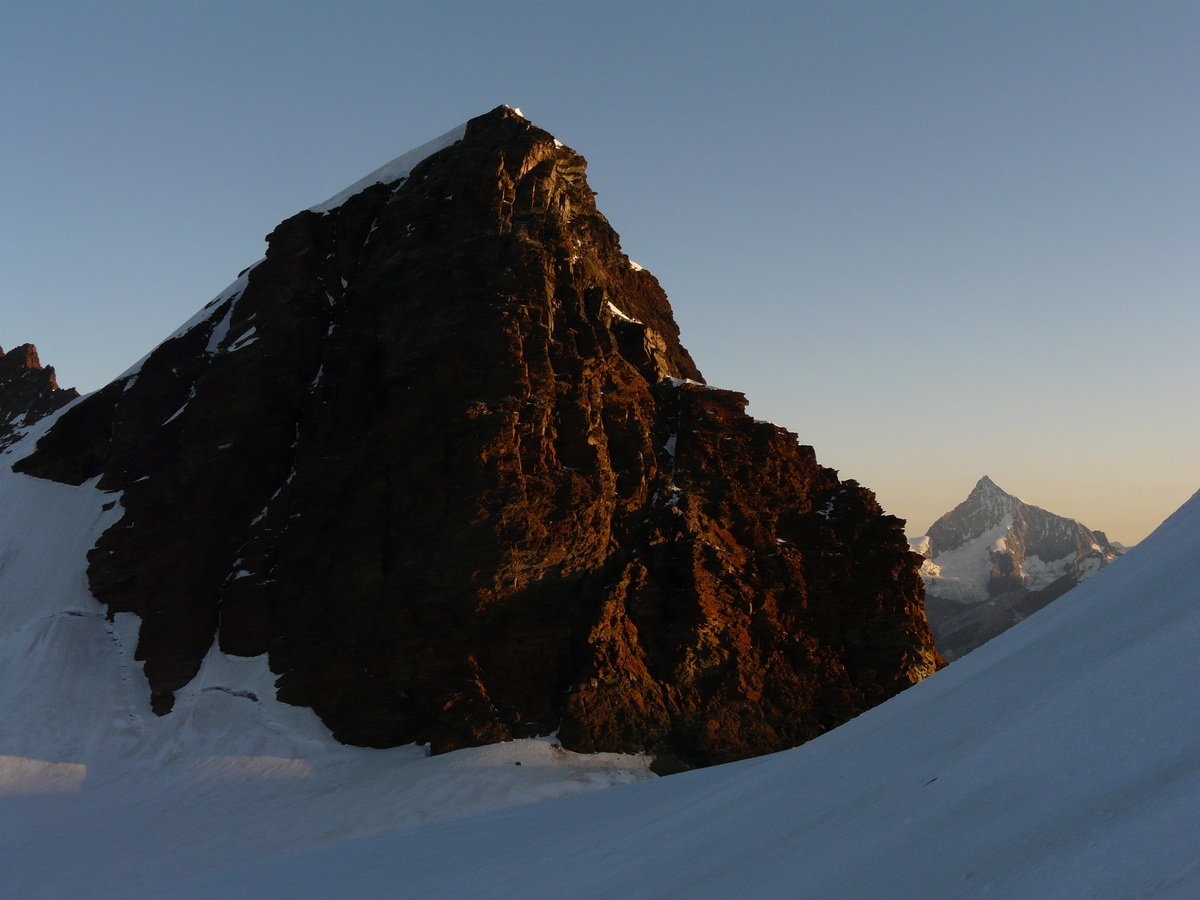
- View from Schwarztor (east side)

Highest point
- Elevation: 4,075 m (13,369 ft)
- Prominence: 20 m (66 ft)
- Parent peak: Eastern Breithorn
- Coordinates: 45°55′57″N 7°46′31″E

Naming
- Native name: Schwarzfluh (German)
- English translation: Black Rock

Geography
- Location within Alps
- Countries: Switzerland and Italy
- Canton/Region: Valais and Aosta Valley
- Parent range: Pennine Alps

The Roccia Nera (Italian for Black Rock, French: Roche noire, German: Schwarzfluh) is a peak of the Breithorn range in the Pennine Alps, on the boundary between the Aosta Valley (northern Italy) and canton of Valais (southern Switzerland). It is the easternmost summit of the Breithorn massif, located east of the Gendarm (or eastern Breithorn Twin). It overlooks the Schwarztor (English: Black Gate) pass on its east side.
