= Geneva Academy =

Location
- 11146 Ponder Rd; Lincoln, Delaware 19960; United States
- 38°49′22″N 75°24′13″W

Information
- Type: Private, Classical Christian
- Motto: Challenging Minds. Encouraging Hearts. Building Leaders.
- Established: 2008 (18 years ago)
- Headmaster: Kevan b. Trenkle
- Grades: K-12
- Enrollment: 37
- Colors: Blue and gold

Geneva Academy is a private classical Christian school located in Lincoln, Delaware. The school was founded in 2008 by a group of homeschool parents, taking inspiration from Dorothy Sayers essay "The Lost Tools of Learning," as well as Douglas Wilson's books, Recovering the Lost Tools of Learning and The Case for Classical Christian Education. Geneva Academy follows a traditional education pattern called the Trivium. This pattern consists of three successive stages: grammar, logic (dialectic), and rhetoric. Geneva Academy was a member of Association of Classical and Christian Schools but, as of September 2020, is no longer a member.
