= Trockener Steg =

Minor prominence between the Matterhorn and the Breithorn

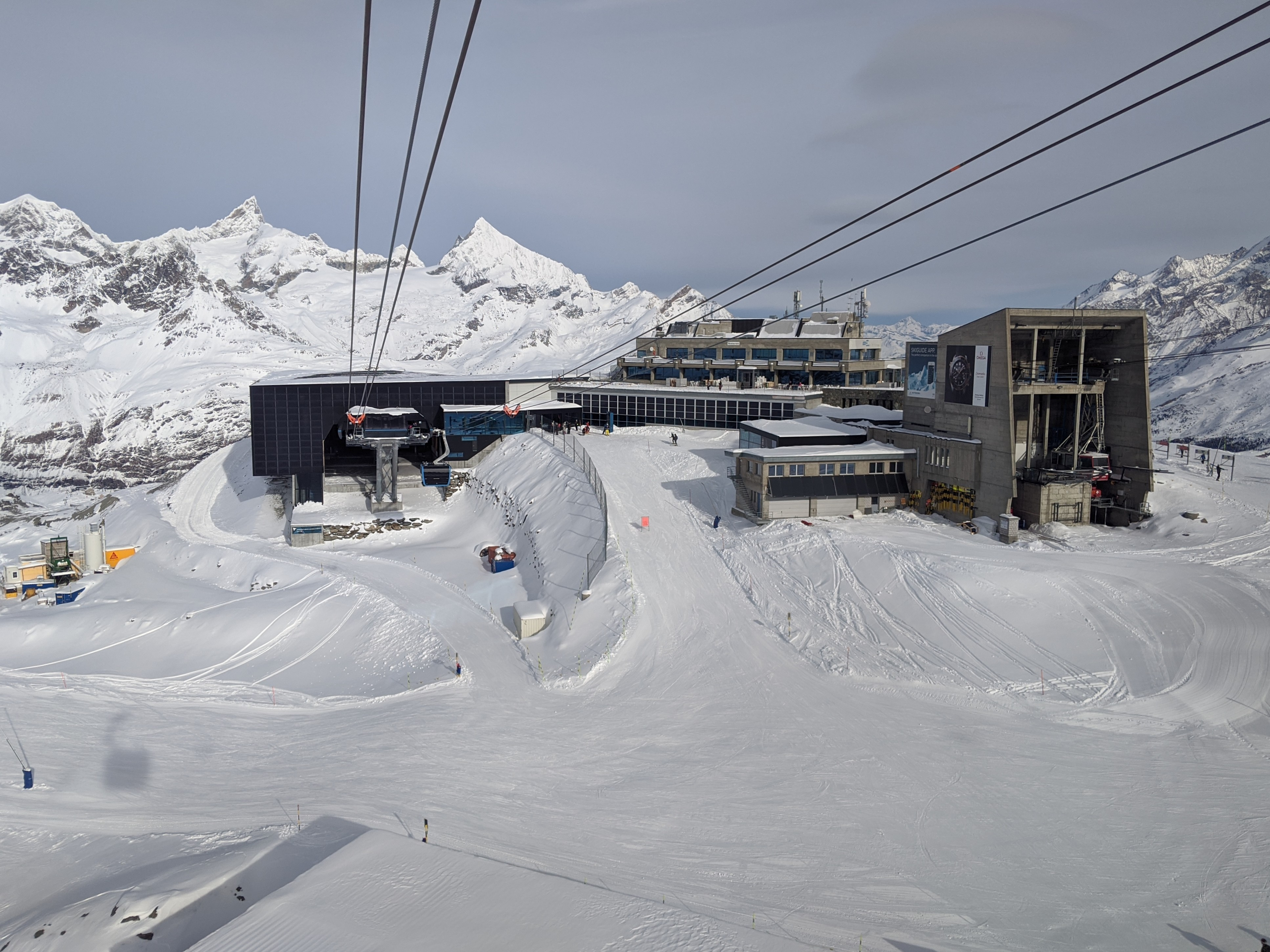

Highest point
- Elevation: 2,939 m (9,642 ft)
- Coordinates: 45°58′17.1″N 7°43′20.5″E

Geography
- Location within Switzerland
- Location: Valais, Switzerland
- Parent range: Pennine Alps

Climbing
- Easiest route: Aerial tramway

Trockener Steg is a minor prominence in the area between the Matterhorn and the Breithorn, south of Zermatt in the canton of Valais. It lies at a height of 2,939 meters (9,642 ft) above sea level, near the front of the Upper Theodul Glacier.

A cable car station lies on the summit and gives access to the Klein Matterhorn.
