= Klein Matterhorn =

Peak of the Pennine Alps

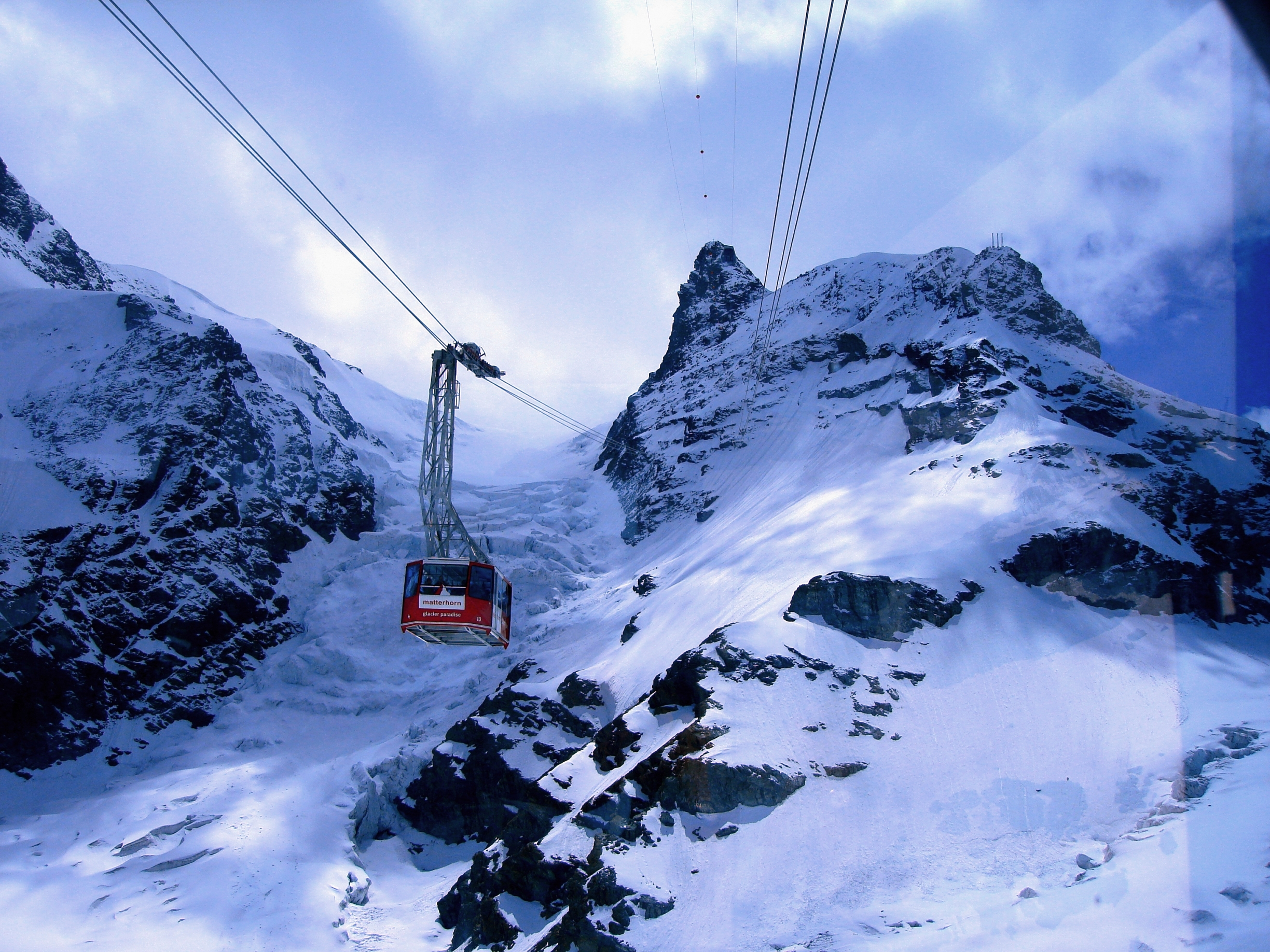
- The Klein Matterhorn from the aerial tramway

Highest point
- Elevation: 3,883 m (12,740 ft)
- Prominence: 88 m (289 ft)
- Parent peak: Breithorn
- Coordinates: 45°56′18″N 7°43′47″E

Naming
- English translation: Little Matterhorn

Geography
- Location within Switzerland
- Location: Zermatt, Valais, Switzerland
- Parent range: Pennine Alps

Climbing
- First ascent: 1789 by Horace-Bénédict de Saussure
- Easiest route: Aerial tramway

The Klein Matterhorn (sometimes translated as Little Matterhorn) is a peak of the Pennine Alps, overlooking Zermatt in the Swiss canton of Valais. At 3,883 metres (12,740 ft) above sea level, it is the highest place in Europe that can be reached by aerial tramway or gondola lift, as well as by any other means of transport. The Klein Matterhorn is part of the Breithorn massif and overlooks on its south side the almost equally high flat glacier named Breithorn Plateau, just north of the international border with Italy. The name "Klein Matterhorn" is a reference to its much larger neighbour, the Matterhorn, which lies 7 km (4.3 mi) away across the Theodul Pass.

The Klein Matterhorn, with the adjacent ski-lifts to the slightly higher Gobba di Rollin, is also a year-round ski area, marketed as "Matterhorn Glacier Paradise", and part of the international ski area between Zermatt and Breuil-Cervinia.

Fast ascents to a height above 3,000 metres (9,800 ft) will frequently lead to headaches or other symptoms of altitude sickness with sensitive people.

== Construction of the Klein Matterhorn cable car lift ==
Even before the construction license application was filed, the building promoter had to negotiate with the Swiss Alpine Club and with the Swiss Nature Conservation Society. These discussions resulted in two large natural reserve zones (the "Matterhorn" region and the "Monte Rosa" region). The third area (the "Schwarzsee-Theodul Glacier-Klein Matterhorn" region) was designated as a tourist zone.

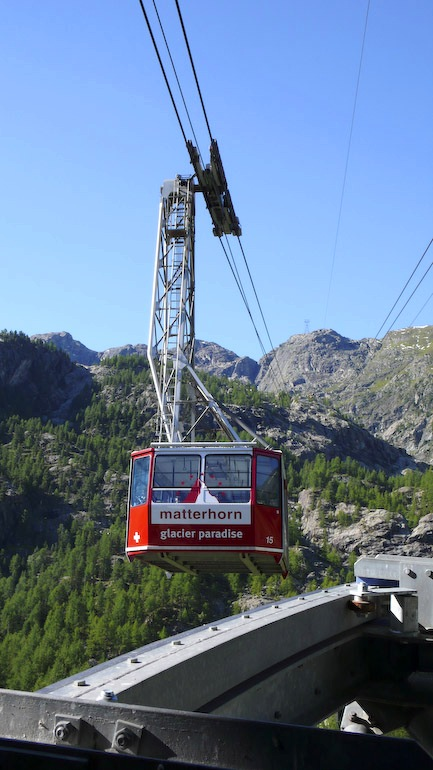
Cable car between Furi and Trockener Steg. The Klein Matterhorn is not visible from here

Licensing was further delayed until 1969 by the citizens of Zermatt filing a complaint to the governing council of the Canton of Valais. In December 1970, the Swiss government finally gave permission for the cable way, but progress was further delayed until 1973 by objections from environmentalists. Eventually, on 17 December 1973, the Federal Council rejected objections and granted a construction license.

The next major obstacle proved to be the recruitment of a work force to build the lift system. At altitudes of 3,000 to 4,000 m (9,843 to 13,123 ft) above sea level, worker productivity would be reduced by up to 50% compared to normal levels, and workers would be required to live for weeks on end within the camps.

The construction of this cable car started in August 1976 at all three construction sites: the valley terminal, the three tower sites and the mountain terminal. Creation of the mountain terminal was a difficult undertaking. Some two thousand cubic metres (2,600 cu yd) of concrete were used in the mountain station, all of which had to be transported by helicopter in specially insulated tanks, mixed with warm water and 2% anti-freeze. Weather conditions at the work site (3,820 metres or 12,530 feet above sea level) in high mountain terrain were extreme: temperatures falling to −40 °C (−40 °F), snowfalls, and high winds of over 100 km/h (62 mph).

In the summer of 1977 the track, hand and counter cables totalling 35.8 kilometres (22.2 mi) in length and weighing 300 tonnes (295 long tons; 331 short tons) were dragged from Schweigmatten to Trockener Steg, a massive undertaking in itself. It took several weeks to cover the distance of 3,600 metres (11,811 ft), with a vertical altitude of almost 1,000 metres or 3,281 feet and to rewind the cables on their reels.

In December 1978, all four track cables were installed, and all remaining operations were completed by the spring of 1979. In the fall of 1979, the two 100 passenger cabins were flown from the village of Täsch to the valley terminal, attached to the hanger frames with the carriages lifted onto the track cables, with operations starting on 23 December, the start of the winter season. The Cable car was built by Von Roll LTD Bern Switzerland.

== Current operation ==
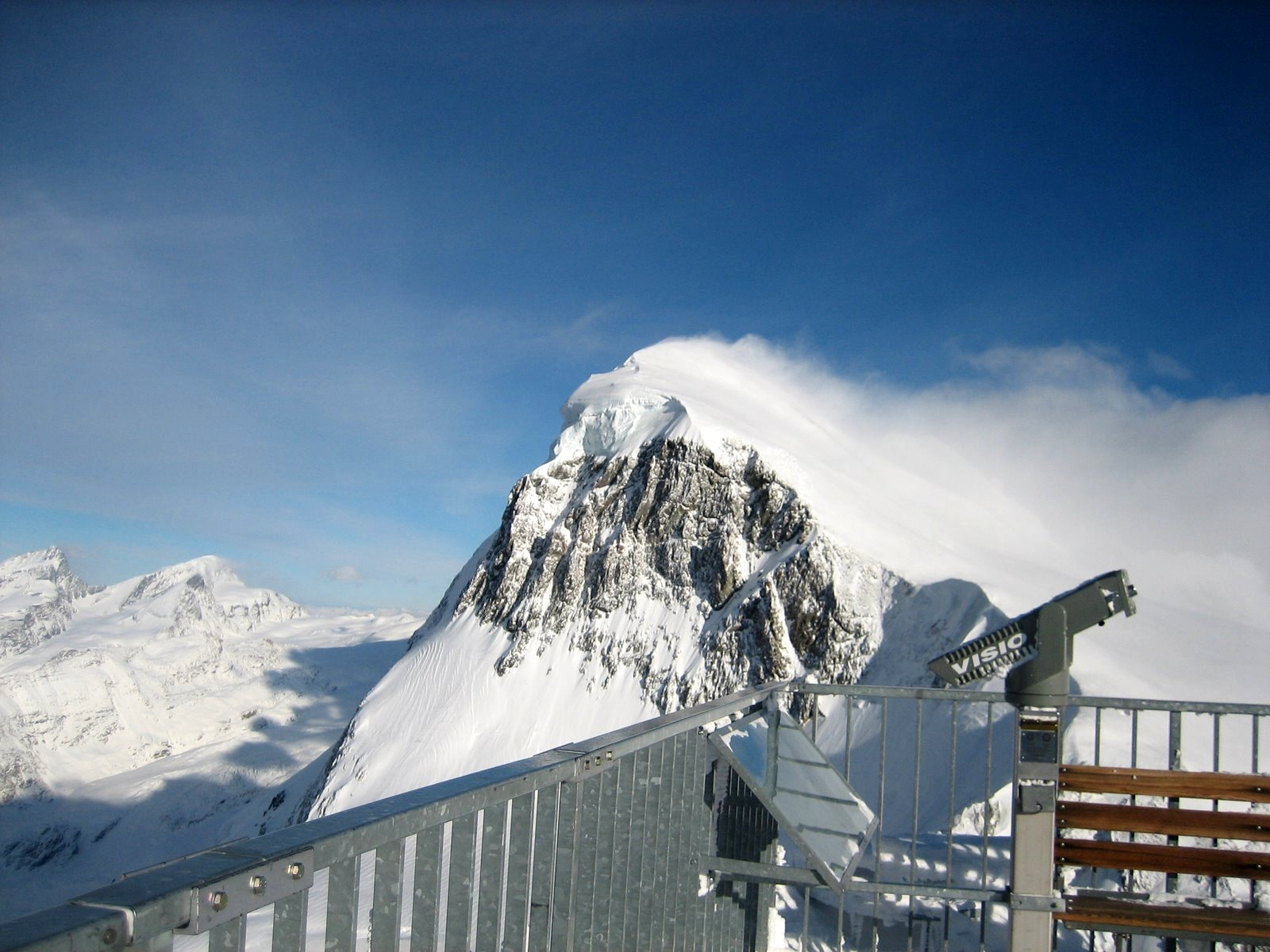
View from the summit towards the Breithorn

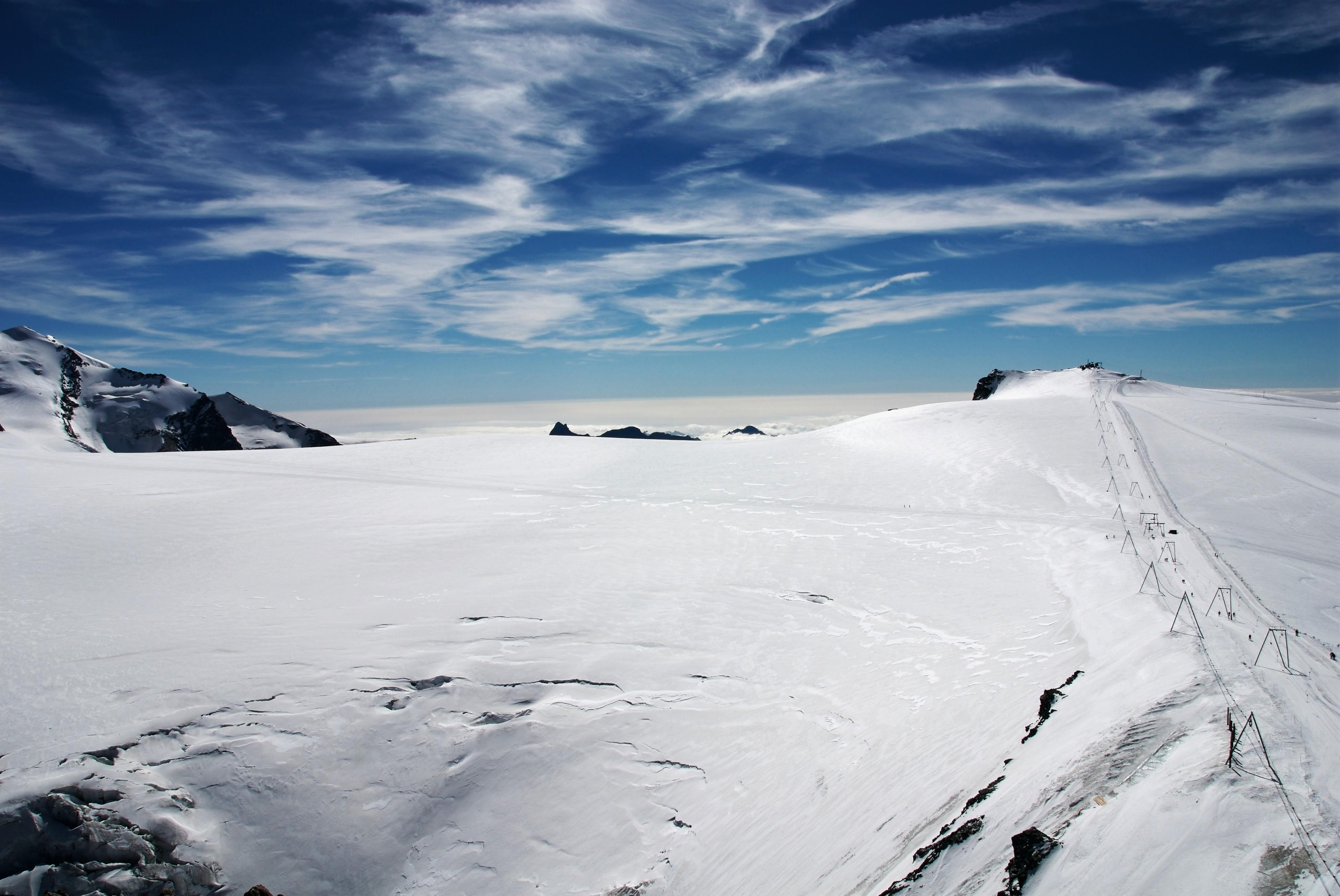
View from the summit towards the ski area (Breithorn Plateau)

The Klein Matterhorn is at the end of a multi-stage cable car journey from Zermatt, via Furi and Trockener Steg. The last station lies at a height of 3,820 metres (12,530 ft), on the north side of the peak. A tunnel connects it with the Breithorn Plateau on the south side. There is also a panoramic view platform on the top which can be reached by elevator—located midway through the tunnel—followed by a 10 m (33 ft) climb up stairs. The Ice Cave ("Glacier Grotto") is just outside the southern entrance with a view into the glacier below. As of 2005, over 14 million passengers had visited since completion, an average of 560,000 per year. The carriages were refurbished in 2005.

Situated in a high-alpine environment, the station's thin air requires visitors to exercise caution during physical exertion. Signs advice travelers, when possible, to take time to acclimatize while ascending to the Klein Matterhorn.

The lift serves the largest and highest summer-ski area in Europe. During summer months one can find many professional, as well as beginner, skiers here. Access to the ski slopes is via a tunnel blasted straight through the mountain.

The Klein Matterhorn is a starting point to several 4,000-metre (13,123 ft) summits that can be reached within a few hours. These include the Breithorn and its subsidiary peaks, Pollux and Castor.

== Plans ==
On December 9, 2005, the ZBAG (Zermatt Bergbahnen AG, the owner of this station) announced plans to significantly expand the facilities at the Klein Matterhorn. They had ordered studies from five large Swiss architectural firms stating some of the following demands: new heating-, water-, waste- and electricity-installations, new toilets, shop and cafeteria, restaurant, mountain cabin (40 beds, SAC (Schweizer Alpen-Club) style), underground access to the gletscher palast (ice cave) and spare room for 2 cableways: one from Trockener Steg (3-cable gondola) and one from Testa Grigia (double cable car). Additionally: a private investor (Heinz Julen) launched the idea of a hotel. Official press announcement (in German)

It was announced in July 2006 the winning design for this construction was to consist of a pyramid of glass, with an observation platform at 4,000 meters with sky lifts on the outer wall to whisk passengers to the "new summit". Zermatt Mountain Cableways seem intent on marketing the construction as "the newest 4,000+ meter peak in the Alps".

== See also ==
- List of mountains of Switzerland accessible by public transport
