= Eastern Breithorn =

Mountain in Switzerland

- western Breithorn Twin
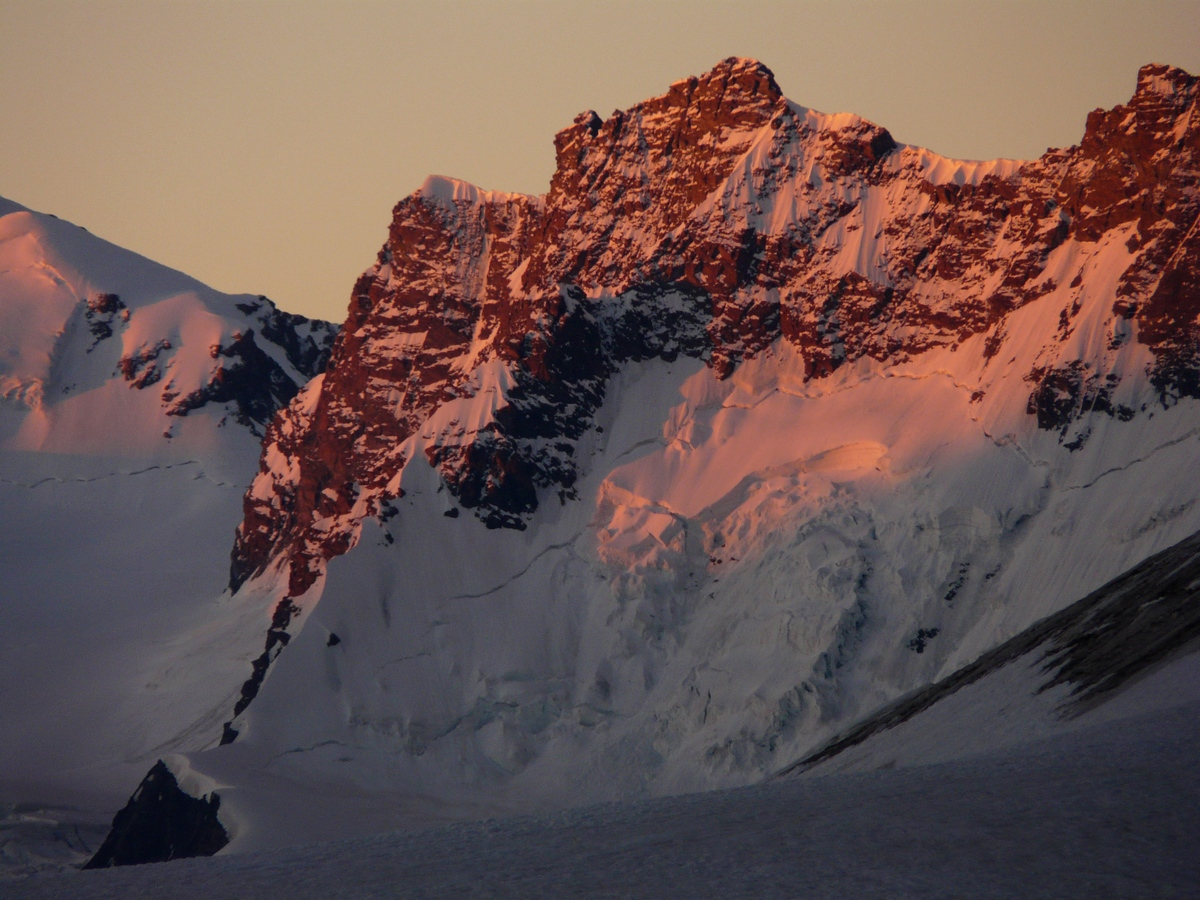
- The north side

Highest point
- Elevation: 4,138 m (13,576 ft)
- Prominence: 120 m (390 ft)
- Parent peak: Breithorn (Western Summit)
- Coordinates: 45°56′14″N 7°46′02″E

Naming
- Native name: Breithorn (Ostgipfel) (German); westlicher Breithornzwilling (German); Breithorn oriental (French); Breithorn Orientale (Italian)

Geography
- Location within Alps
- Countries: Switzerland and Italy
- Canton/Region: Valais and Aosta Valley
- Parent range: Pennine Alps

The Eastern Breithorn (German: Breithorn (Ostgipfel), French: Breithorn oriental, Italian: Breithorn Orientale) but also referred as the western Breithorn Twin (German: westlicher Breithornzwilling), is a peak of the Pennine Alps, located on the border between Switzerland and Italy, between the canton of Valais and the region of Aosta Valley. It is part of the Breithorn range, located east of the Theodul Pass. It lies between the Central Breithorn and its other twin, the Gendarm (or eastern Breithorn Twin). On its north side it overlooks the Breithorn Glacier.
