= Gandegg Hut =

Alpine hut in Valais, Switzerland

Coordinates: 45°57′51″N 7°43′32″E

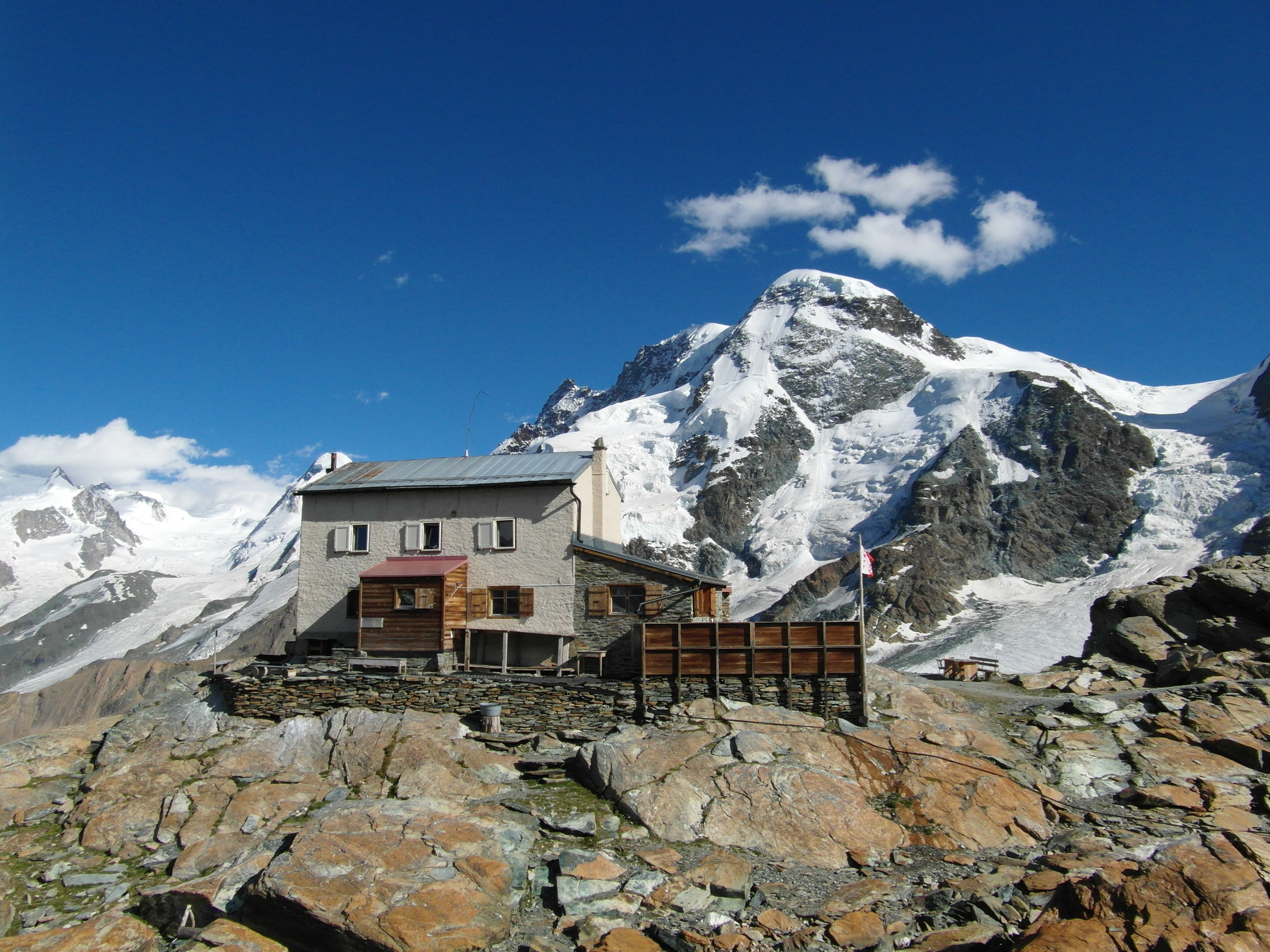
The Gandegg Hut with the Breithorn in background

The Gandegg Hut (German: Gandegghütte) is an alpine hut, located above Zermatt in the canton of Valais. It is located at a height of 3,029 metres (9,938 ft) above sea level, near Trockener Steg, approximately halfway between the Matterhorn and the Breithorn.

The hut was built in 1885.

== See also ==
- List of buildings and structures above 3000 m in Switzerland
