= Theodulhorn =

Mountain of the Pennine Alps

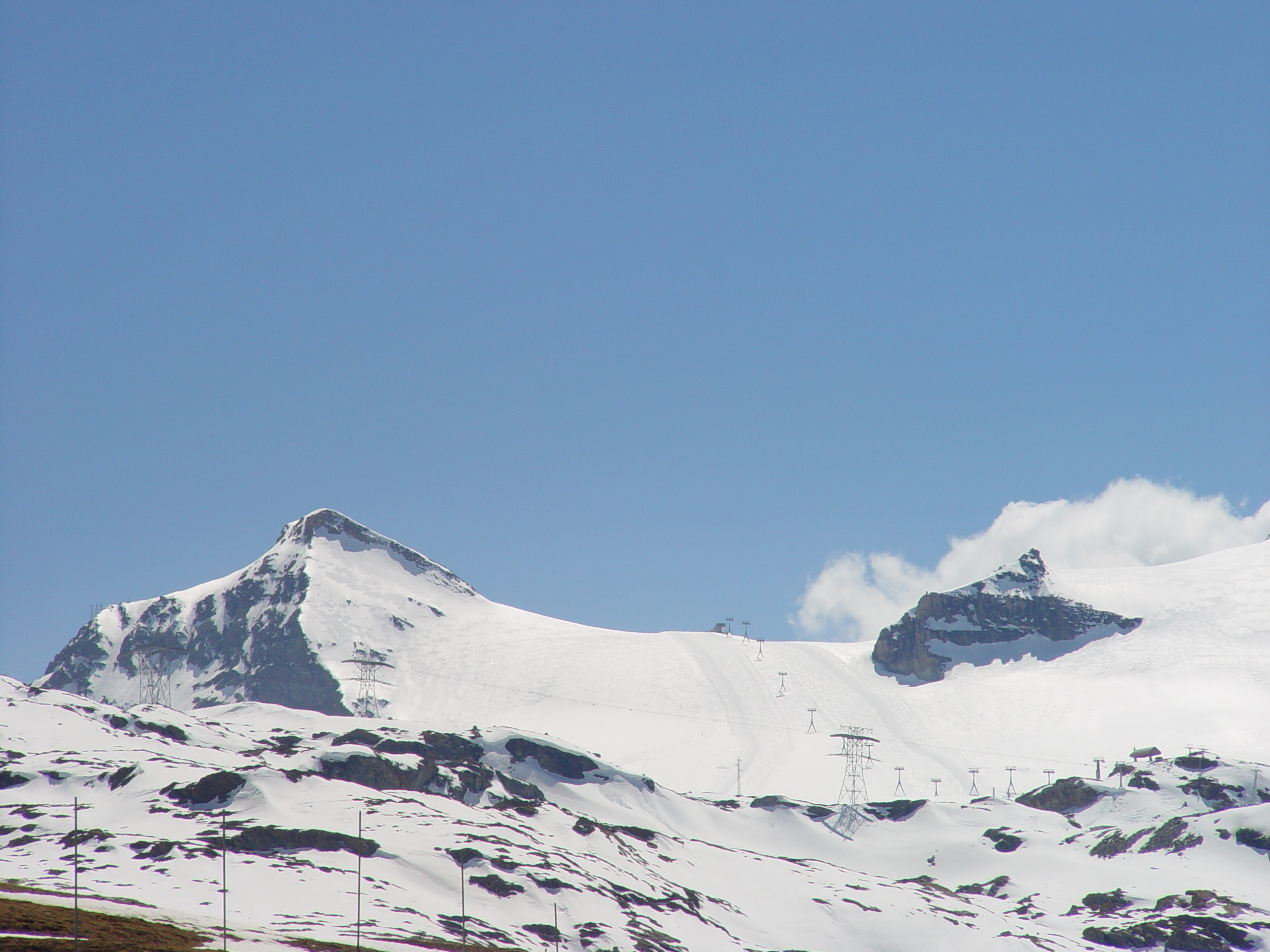
- The Theodulhorn (left) from the north side

Highest point
- Elevation: 3,469 m (11,381 ft)
- Prominence: 120 m (390 ft)
- Parent peak: Furgggrat
- Coordinates: 45°56′57.6″N 07°42′30.3″E

Geography
- Location within Alps
- Location: Valais, Switzerland; Aosta Valley, Italy
- Parent range: Pennine Alps

The Theodulhorn (French: Mont de Saint-Théodule - 3,469 m) is a mountain of the Pennine Alps, overlooking the Theodul Pass on the border between Switzerland and Italy. It lies south of Zermatt (in Valais) and east of Breuil-Cervinia (in the Aosta Valley). The northern side of the mountain is heavily glaciated and is part of a ski area.

The Theodulhorn is the easternmost summit of the range descending from the south-east ridge of Matterhorn, named Furgggrat. It is named for Theodul Pass, which is in turn named for Saint Theodul, patron saint of the Valais.
