= Theodul Pass =

Mountain pass across the eastern Pennine Alps

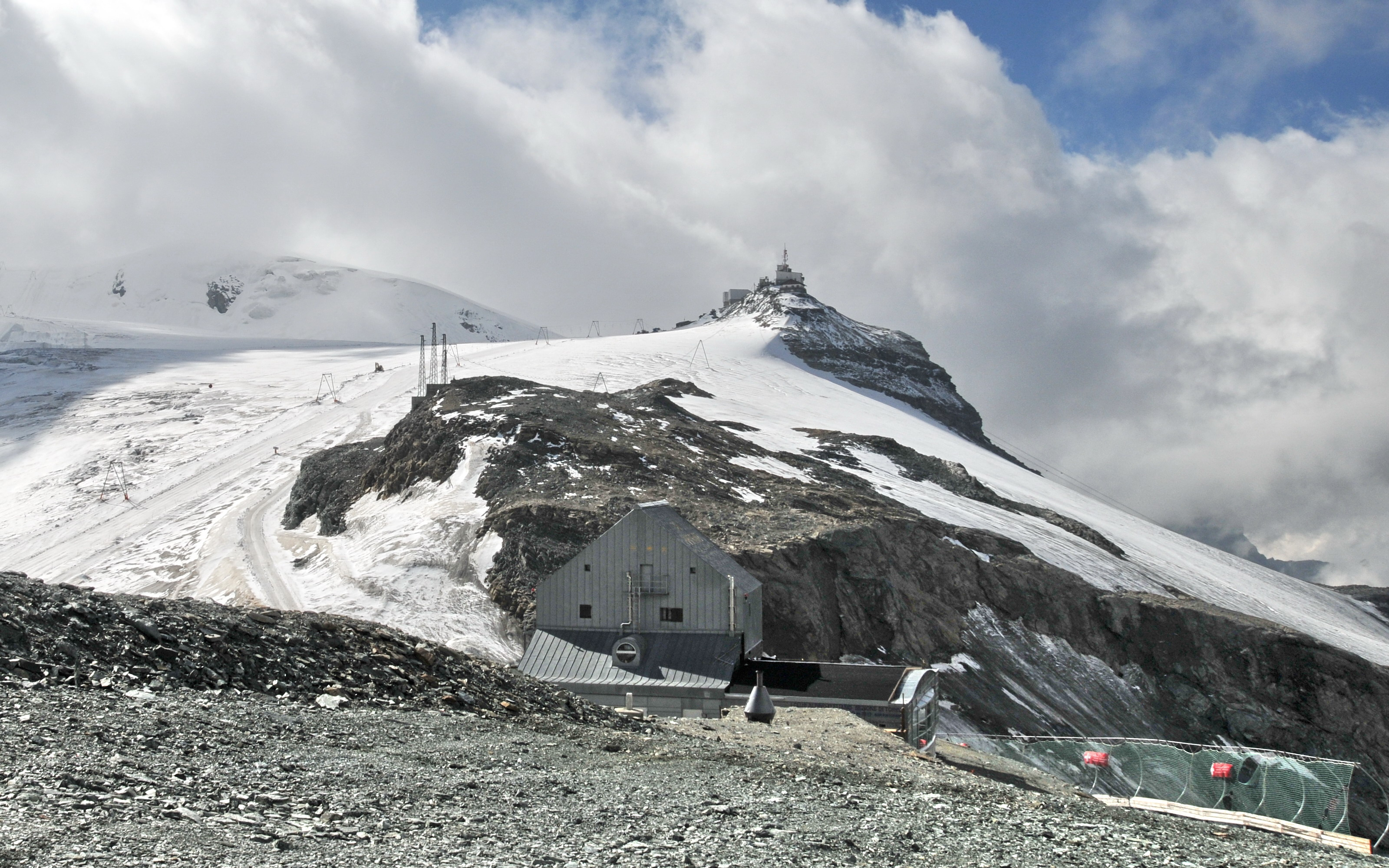
- View of the pass with Testa Grigia in background from the Theodul hut

- Location within Alps Location within Aosta Valley Location within Canton of Valais
- Elevation: 3,295 metres (10,810 ft)
- Traversed by: Glacier

Third Approach
- Location: Aosta Valley, Italy; Valais, Switzerland
- Range: Pennine Alps
- Coordinates: 45°56′37″N 7°42′32″E

Theodul Pass, elevation 3,295 metres (10,810 ft), (German: Theodulpass, Italian: Colle del Teodulo, French: Col de Saint-Théodule, Walser German: Theoduljoch) is a high mountain pass across the eastern Pennine Alps, connecting Zermatt in the Swiss canton of Valais and Breuil-Cervinia in the Italian region of Aosta Valley. Theodul Pass is the lowest and the easiest pass between the valleys of Zermatt and Valtournanche.

The pass lies between the Matterhorn on the west and the Breithorn on the east and is overlooked by the Theodulhorn and Testa Grigia. The Rifugio del Teodulo (hut) is located just above the pass. The east side of the pass is covered by large glaciers part of the Theodul Glacier system and is part of a year-round ski area. On the Italian side, the pass can be reached from Breuil-Cervinia by a dead-end trail. On the Swiss side, trails go up from Trockener Steg and Gandegg Hut.

== Traverse by bicycle ==
In 1965, Percy Stallard (aged 55) rode his bicycle solo over the Theodul Pass. The Rough Stuff Fellowship, an organisation for enthusiasts of cross-country cycling, acknowledged that it was probably the first time a cyclist had done it. Stallard made it in less than 15 hours, sometimes through deep snow.

== See also ==
- List of mountain passes
