= Breithorn =

Mountain range of the Pennine Alps

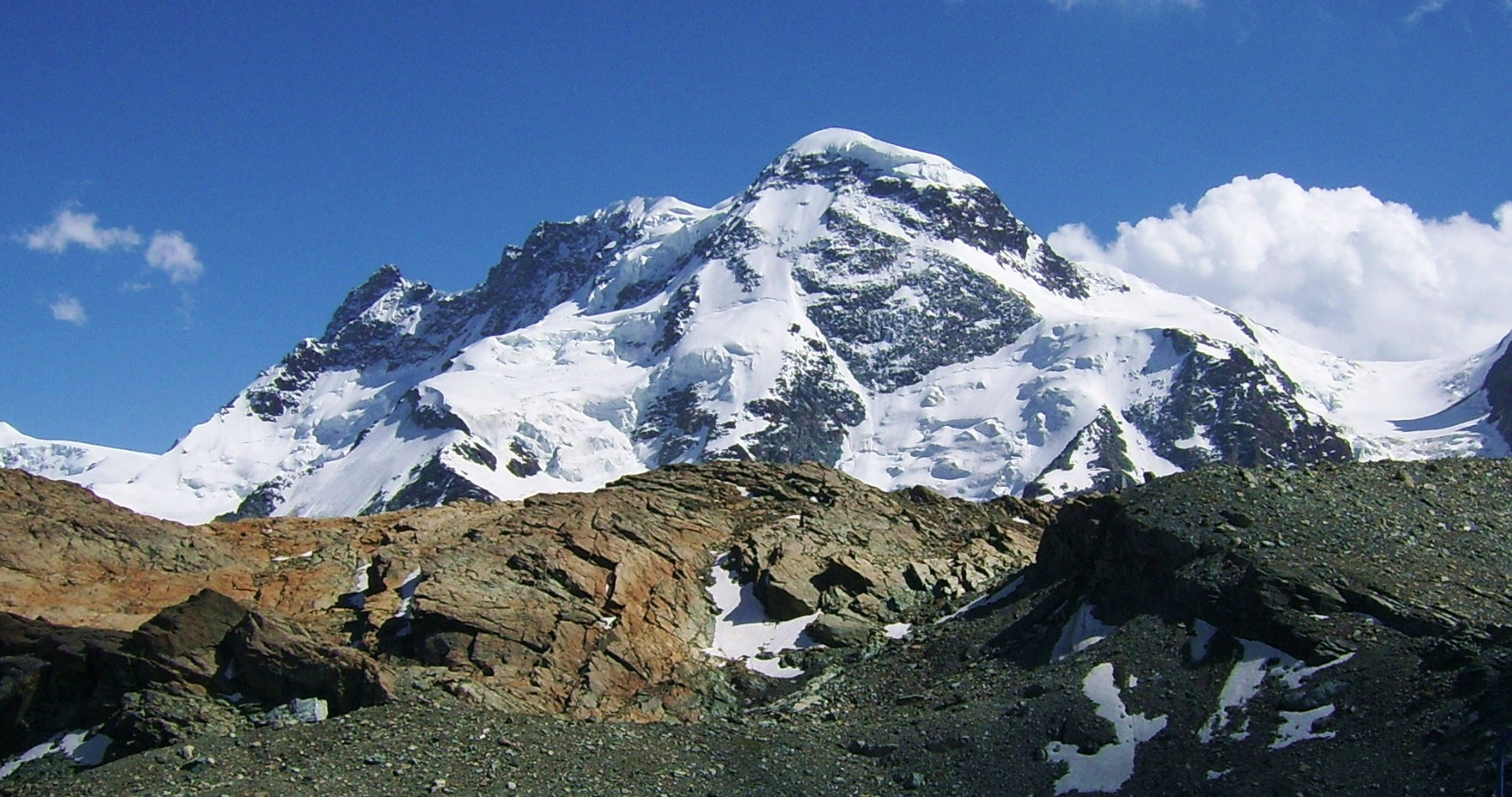
- The north side of the Breithorn as seen from Gandegg

Highest point
- Peak: Breithorn (Western Summit)
- Elevation: 4,164 m (13,661 ft)
- Prominence: 438 m (1,437 ft)
- Parent peak: Dufourspitze
- Isolation: 4.0 km (2.5 mi)
- Listing: Mountains of Switzerland; Mountains of Italy
- Coordinates: 45°56′28″N 7°44′50″E

Naming
- English translation: Broad Horn
- Language of name: German

Geography
- Location within Alps Location within Switzerland Location within Italy
- Location of the Breithorn Location in the Alps
- Countries: Switzerland; Italy
- Canton/Region: Valais; Aosta Valley
- Parent range: Pennine Alps

Climbing
- First ascent: 1813
- Easiest route: Basic glacier/snow climb

The Breithorn (Swiss Standard German pronunciation: [ˈbraɪthɔrn]; German for literally "broad horn"; 13,661 ft. or 4,160 m) is a mountain range of the Pennine Alps with its highest peak of the same name (but also called Breithorn (Western Summit)), located on the border between Switzerland and Italy. It lies on the main chain of the Alps, approximately halfway between the Matterhorn and Monte Rosa and east of the Theodul Pass. Most of the massif is glaciated and includes several subsidiary peaks, all located east of the main summit: the Central Breithorn, the western Breithorn Twin (or Eastern Breithorn), the Gendarm (or eastern Breithorn Twin) and the Roccia Nera. The main summit is sometimes distinguished by the name Western Breithorn (German: Breithorn (Westgipfel), Italian: Breithorn Occidentale). The nearest settlements are Zermatt (Valais) and St-Jacques (Aosta Valley).

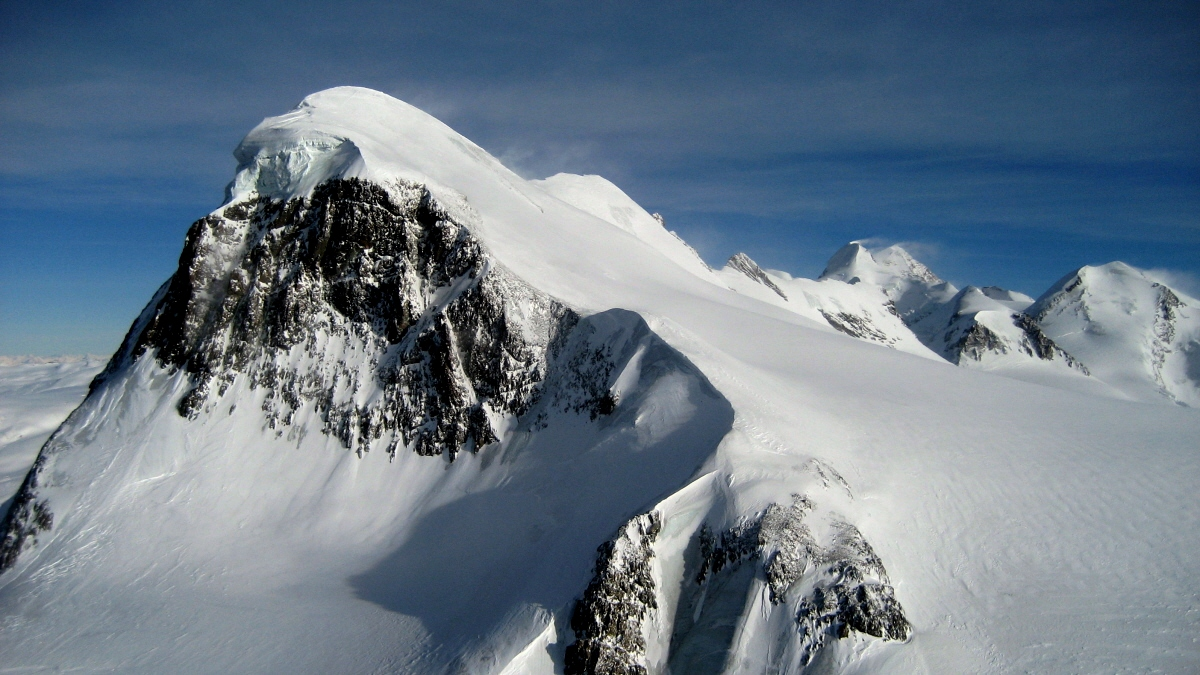
The Breithorn (Western Summit), as seen from Klein Matterhorn (west side)

The Breithorn is considered the most easily climbed 4,000 m Alpine peak. This is due to the Klein Matterhorn cable car which takes climbers to over 3,820 m (12,700 ft) from Zermatt as a starting point. The standard route (SSW flank) is from the Italian side of the mountain (the south side) and continues over a glacial plateau before climbing to the summit on a 35 degree snow slope. However, inexperienced mountaineers may run into severe difficulty if caution is not taken near cornices or in bad weather. For experienced climbers wanting more of a challenge, the half traverse of the Breithorn crest is another option.

The Breithorn was first climbed in 1813 by Henry Maynard (climber), Joseph-Marie Couttet, Jean Gras, Jean-Baptiste Erin and Jean-Jacques Erin.

== See also ==
- List of mountains of the Alps over 4000 metres
