= Breuil-Cervinia =

Alpine resort in the Aosta Valley region of northwest Italy

- Frazione
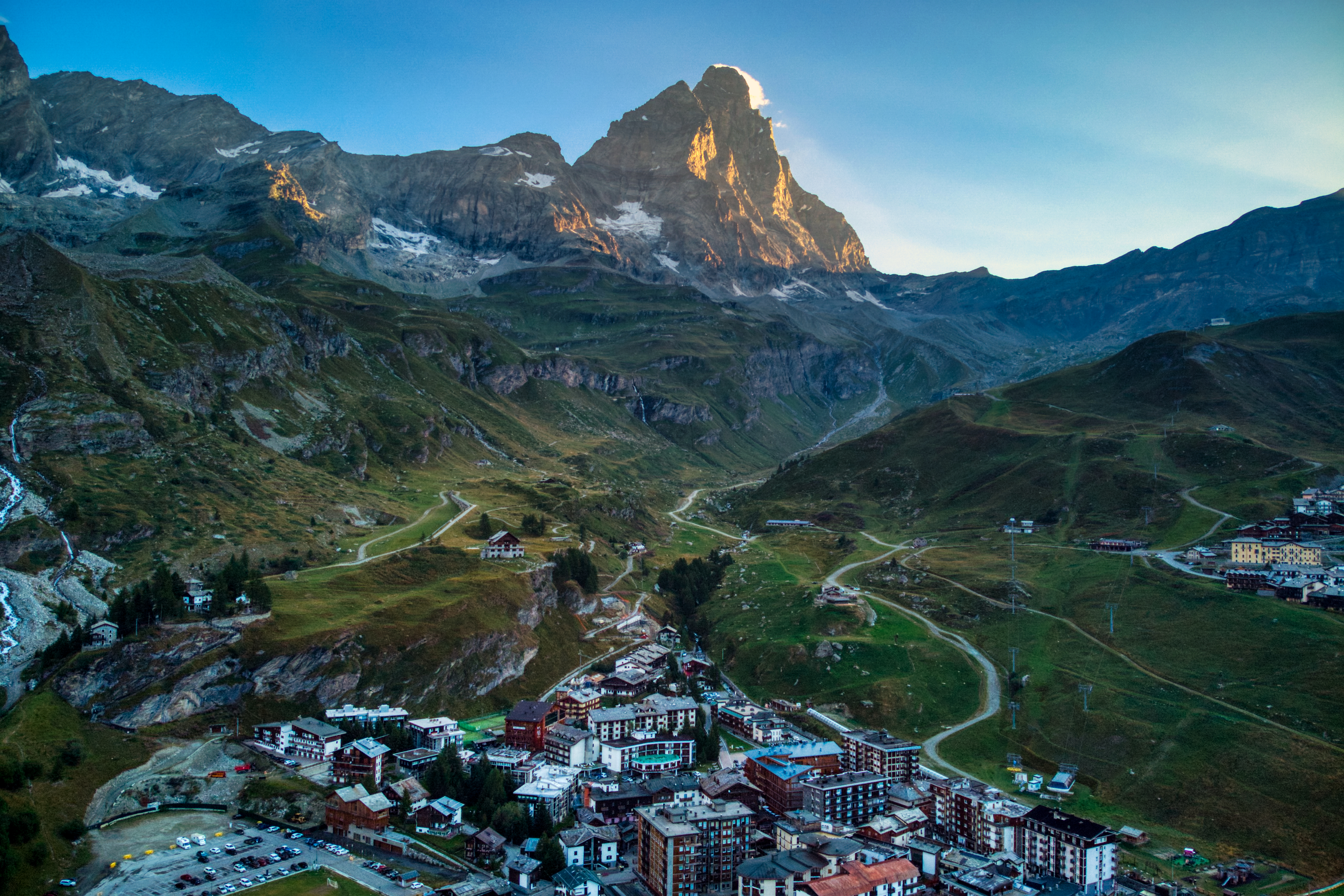
- Breuil-Cervinia

- Location of Breuil-Cervinia in Italy
- Country: Italy
- Region: Aosta Valley
- Comune: Valtournenche
- Time zone: UTC+1 (CET)
  - Summer (DST): UTC+2 (CEST)
- Postal code: 11021

Breuil-Cervinia (French: Breuil; Italian: Cervinia; Valdôtain: Breuill) is a frazione of the comune of Valtournenche, Italy. It is a winter and summer tourist resort.

== Etymology ==
The name Breuil-Cervinia is a fusion of two terms. On the one hand was Breuil, in French, the original name of the place before the tourist settlement was built, derived from Valdôtain dialect Breuill indicating a marshy meadow, or a field where streams are numerous. Breuil and its derived forms have commonly appeared in Aosta Valley, France, and Romandy. On the other was Cervinia, the toponym that was given to the hamlet following the process of italianization of placenames in the Aosta Valley wanted by the fascist government, a reference to the Matterhorn mountain (Italian: Monte Cervino).

=== 2023 name change ===
In April 2023, the municipal council of Valtournenche unanimously voted in favour of adopting the toponym "Le Breuil", proposed by a toponomy commission of the Aosta Valley autonomous region. The name change was part of an effort that started in 2011 to redefine all the local toponyms that resulted in 52 name changes. In September 2023, a decree of the president of Aosta Valley officially changed the name of the hamlet from Breuil-Cervinia to Le Breuil. The name change sparked criticism due to concerns about potential bureaucratic complications as well as damage to the tourism industry., with tourism minister Daniela Santanchè urging the local council to "think again". The municipal council of Valtournenche, which had voted in favour for the proposal, including mayor Elisa Cicco and former mayor Jean-Antoine Maquignaz, claimed there had been a "misunderstanding". Cicco admitted that "no one wanted to cancel the name Cervinia," and "it is our brand, our brand by which we are known throughout the world". Just 24 hours after the official name change, Mayor Elisa Cicco and President of Aosta Valley Renzo Testolin started the procedure to restore the toponym. On March 8, 2024, the municipal council declared that the toponym "Breuil-Cervinia" would be requested, and that the names of all the hamlets would be asked to be reviewed. The review process is expected to be completed within 12 months.

Ultimately, in January 2025, the village was officially renamed "Breuil-Cervinia," combining the historical name with the well-known touristic name. This decision was criticized by local associations, which described it as a blow to the region's cultural and linguistic heritage, noting that the previous name had been well received by cultural associations and residents.

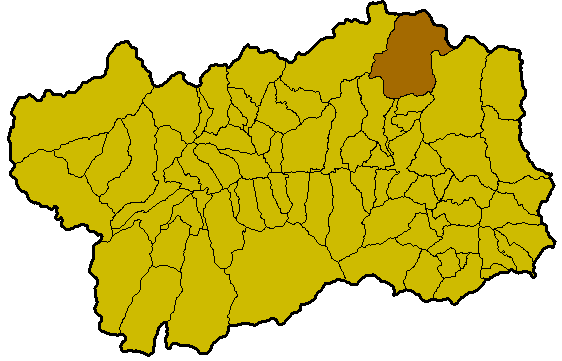
The comune of Valtournenche within the Aosta Valley region

== Geography ==
Breuil-Cervinia lies at 2,050 m (6,730 ft) above sea level, at the foot of the Matterhorn, in the Valtournenche Valley and surrounded by the Jumeaux, the Château des Dames, the Furggen and the Grandes Murailles summits. It shares a ski area with Zermatt through the Plateau Rosa glacier (3,500 m [11,500 ft]).

The ski season in Breuil-Cervinia lasts not only 6 months in winter but also in summer on the Plateau Rosa glacier. The Theodul Pass lies on the territory of Breuil-Cervinia. The village is divided by the Marmore creek.

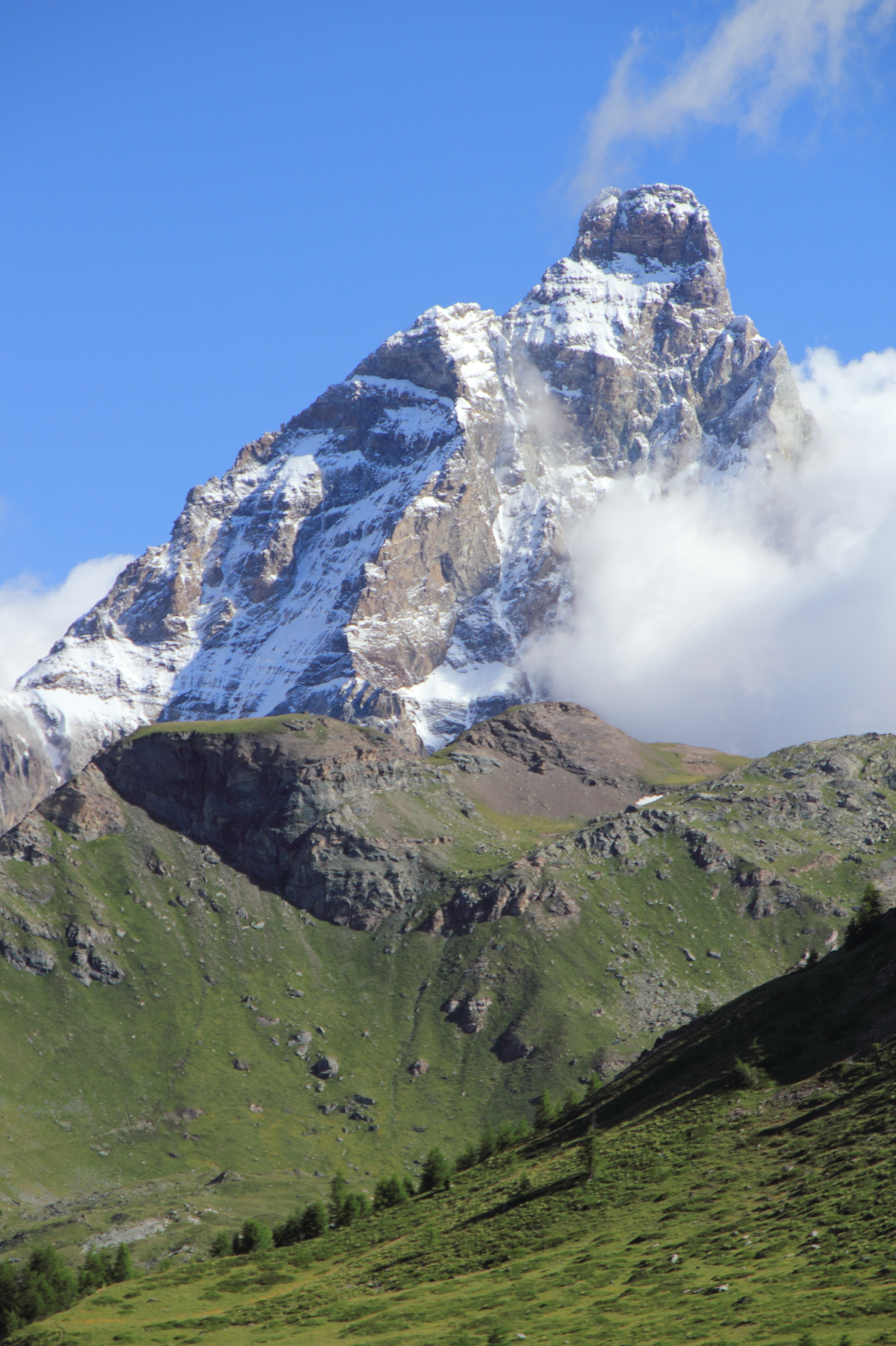
Matterhorn seen from the valley of Valtournenche

== Climate ==
Breuil-Cervinia being one of Europe's highest ski resorts, its climate features low temperatures and consistent snow falls. Temperatures get very cold through the winter months with daily averages being around −5 and −10 °C (23.0 and 14.0 °F) for the winter months and only about 8–10 °C (46.4–50.0 °F) in the summer months. This maintains the snow in great shape throughout the winter season. December usually averages round 40–50 cm (16–20 in) in resort and 140–160 cm (55–63 in) on the mountain, January approx 80 and 200 cm (31 and 79 in), February approx 90 and 220 cm (35 and 87 in), March 100 and 240 cm (39 and 94 in), April 60–200 cm (24–79 in).

== History ==
Breuil-Cervinia has a short history. Until the beginning of the 19th century, the Breuil basin was just a pasture, with a group of shepherds living in a few alpine cottages only in summer. However, in the Middle Ages, the Breuil was an important crossroad for merchants who had to cross the Alps and for the settlement of the Walser community in the near the Ayas and Lys valleys.

The real growth of the town began in the 1850s with the birth of alpinism all over the Alps. The explorations of Horace-Bénedict de Saussure through the Savoy Alps in the 1700s heightened interest in the Matterhorn and the other mountains of the Savoyard state, particularly among the English bourgeoisie, who were increasingly interested in wilderness travel.

Resident shepherds, such as Jean-Antoine Carrel, had long looked upon their home mountain as something attainable, and made the first attempts to ascend the Matterhorn from the south face. Many European mountain climbers saw the Matterhorn as a great challenge, and the arrival of John Tyndall and Edward Whymper in Breuil began competition for the first complete ascent, aided by Jean-Antoine's knowledge of the territory. The construction of some bases became necessary. Some examples are the first Refuge du Théodule (built in 1852) at 3317 m (10882.6 ft), the Jumeaux Hotel and the Hôtel du Cervin.

The Valtournenche Valley, the Grandes Murailles and the Matterhorn.

After years of collaboration with Jean-Antoine Carrel, the competition was won by Edward Whymper in 1865, after he realised that the Hörnli ridge was easier to climb. Only three days later, Jean-Antoine Carrel was able to climb the Matterhorn by the more difficult Lion ridge. After Edward Whymper's ascent team on the north face met with disaster while returning to Zermatt, Amé Gorret, a fellow climber and fellow countryman of Jean-Antoine Carrel, realised that tourism in Breuil could be increased by building the first alpine refuge on the Matterhorn. Amé Gorret asked the Italian Alpine Club to support his project, which resulted the refuge located at the Cravate (4,120 m) of the Matterhorn, inaugurated in 1867.

As a result of the exploratory drive and the newborn mountaineering movement, the Società Guide del Cervino (it.) / Société des guides du Cervin (fr.), one of the oldest mountain guide societies in the world, was founded in Breuil in 1865.

The first hotels began to be built in the area and the town began to develop from a simple alpine pasture to a tourist destination. With the emergence of ski mountaineering, the Breuil slopes became the destination of the first skiers, accelerating the transformation into a top tourist destination.

A number of entrepreneurs from Piedmont, driven by the desire to build new hydroelectric plants on behalf of the Società Idroelettrica Piemontese, explore the side valleys of the Aosta Valley, including the Valtournenche Valley. During the explorations and the first construction of hydroelectric plants in the lower part of the Valtournenche Valley, the entrepreneur and engineer Dino Lora Totino saw in Breuil the possibility of creating a first-class tourist resort. In 1934, together with other Piedmontese entrepreneurs, Dino Lora Totino founded the Società Anonima Cervino, with the aim of transforming Breuil into an important tourist destination by building modern ski lifts.

In 1934, the road connecting the main town of Valtournenche, Pâquier, to Breuil was built. Two years later, the Breuil - Plan Maison cable car (2,555 m) was inaugurated.

During 1939 Breuil was renamed Cervinia because of the fascist project of Italianization of Aosta Valley's toponyms. 1939 also had been the year of a big venture: the highest skilift in Italy was opened, linking Plan Maison with the Testa Grigia at 3480 m (11417 ft), near the Swiss border. An observatory for cosmic ray physics and the physics of the Earth's atmosphere was also built near Plateau Rosa and is now used as a meteorological station run by the Italian Air Force.

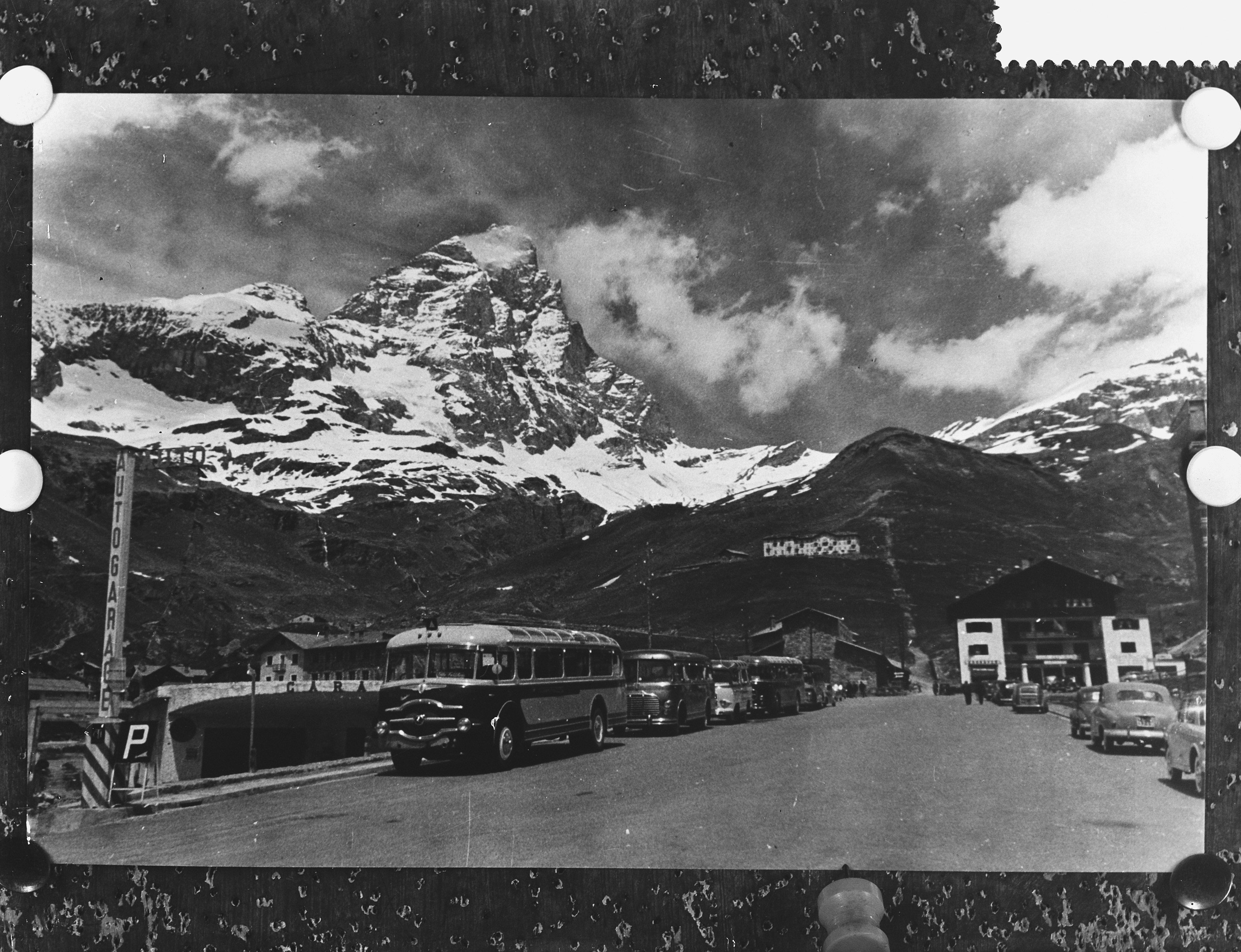
A 1950s Breuil-Cervinia postcard

After the World War II, the first ski lifts were built around Breuil-Cervinia and Plan Maison. In 1952, again at the instigation of Dino Lora Totino, a new cable car was built from Plan Maison to Furggen. It was a single-span cable car, and was so long that the designer had to take the curvature of the Earth into account when designing it. The cableway and its associated slope were so impervious that, following the death of several people who had fallen from the Furggen, it was necessary to build a tunnel onto the mountain, which would make it easier for skiers and the operators of the Società Cervino to descend to the glacier below, avoiding the more inexperienced skiers from having to use the more exposed part of the slope.

Also in the 1950s, Breuil-Cervinia, Plateau Rosa and the Matterhorn were chosen by the Italian Alpine Club and Ardito Desio as locations to prepare the famous 1954 K2 expedition, which included Achille Compagnoni and Walter Bonatti.

In 1961, the Plan Maison-Cime Bianche-Plateau Rosa cable car was replaced by a new system built by Piemonte Funivie. In 1963, the Breuil-Plan Maison cable car, the first cable car to be built in Breuil-Cervinia, was replaced by a new, large cable car, and a second cable car was built next to it in order to double the hourly capacity of the ski lifts.

In 1962, the "Lac Bleu" bobsleigh track was completed near the Lago Blu and inaugurated by Olympic champion Eugenio Monti.

In 1972, the first two-seater chairlift was built at Cielo Alto. The unification in 1982 with the Valtournenche ski resort added prestige to Cervinia. In 1986, the Breuil-Plan Maison 1 cable car was replaced by a 6-passenger gondola lift and in 1988, the long Plan Maison-Laghi Cime Bianche gondola lift was opened. In 1991 the Plateau Rosa cable car was replaced by a cable car with 140-passenger cabins.

In 1993, the Furggen cable car was closed and abandoned, as it was hardly used due to the wind and also heavily damaged in an accident.

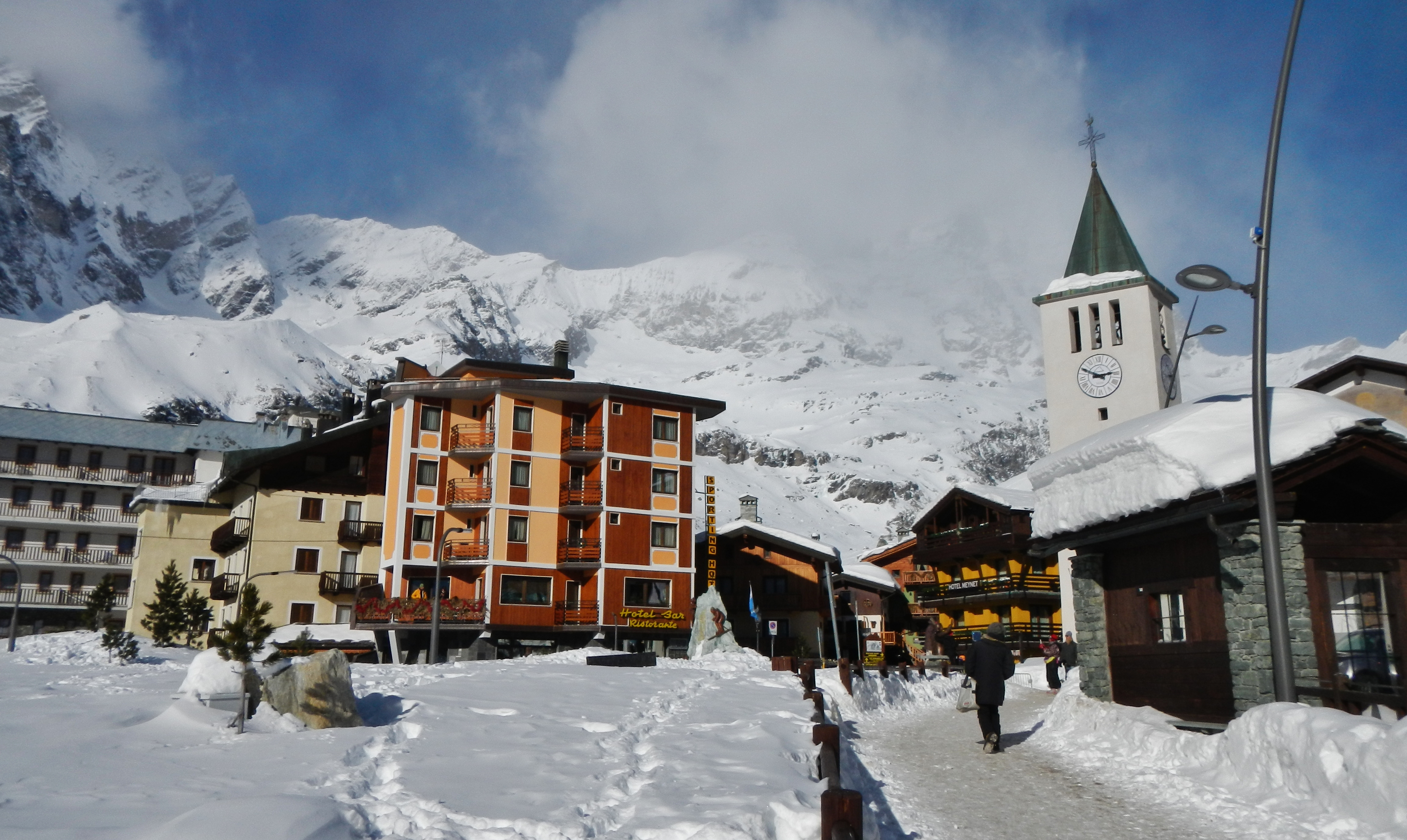
Breuil-Cervinia town centre

In the 2000s, the Società Cervino encountered considerable financial difficulties and was unable to invest in the station. In 2006, thanks to regional funding, it was possible to build two modern chairlifts, called Crétaz and Campetto, to replace the old ski lifts. In 2008, increasing financial difficulties led the Cravetto family, the historic owners of the Breuil-Cervinia ski lifts, to decide to sell its majority shares in Società Cervino. These were bought by the Autonomous Region Aosta Valley (about 70%; the remaining 30% was managed by private individuals), and the company thus became public, like most of its Aosta Valley counterparts operating in the sector. The first step of the new management towards modernisation was taken in 2009, with the inauguration of the Pancheron hexapost chairlift. In 2012 the Plateau Rosa cable car is renewed.

Thanks to its rapid growth, Cervinia and its ski resort, as many other town on the Alps like Courmayeur, Chamonix-Mont-Blanc, Limone Piemonte, Pila, Sestriere, Zermatt, Sankt Moritz, became a field of architectural and engineering experimentation, trying to develop a new alpine architecture and new technologies for buildings and lifts. Examples of this research are the Cielo Alto buildings, the Casa del Sole, the original Refuge du Théodule, the Pirovano hut and, as far as ski lifts are concerned, the Breuil-Plan Maison cable car and the Gran Baita hotel, the Plateau Rosa cable car, the Plan Maison - Monte Furggen cable car. The architects who oversaw the urban development of the town include important names such as Carlo Mollino, Francesco Dolza, Giovanni Muzio, Franco Albini and Mario Galvagni.

== Economy ==
Today Breuil-Cervinia is fully dependent on tourism, both during winter and summer, thanks to the possibility of summer ski on the Plateau Rosa Glacier and the ski lifts links of Matterhorn Ski Paradise, the beauty of its alpine landscape and the presence of the Matterhorn.

In summer, the plains of Breuil-Cervinia are home to alpine pastures with cows whose milk is used to produce the first Aosta Valley cheese, Fontina, and other toma cheeses.

== Landmarks ==
=== Locations ===
- Lago Blu (it.) / Lac Bleu or Lac de Layet (fr.).
- Lac de Goillet, artificial lake nearby Cime Bianche lift station.
- Plateau Rosa.
- Plan Maison.
- Furggen arrival lift station and panorama.
- Refuge Jean-Antoine Carrel.
- Refuge Duc des Abruzzes à l'Oriondé.

=== Religious buildings ===
- Notre-Dame-des-Ermites chapel, built in the 16th century.
- Notre-Dame-des-Neiges church, built in the 1950s.
- Maria Regina Vallis Augustanae parish church, built in the 1950s.
- Saint Anne and Pope John Paul II chapel.
- Alpini chapel.
- Croce del Papa (it.) / Croix du Pape (fr.), a monument dedicated to Pope John Paul II.
- Croix Carrel, a monument dedicated to Jean-Antoine Carrel, remembering the place where he died.

=== Museums ===
- Luigi Amedeo Hut, the Matterhorn mountain hut dedicated to Prince Luigi Amedeo, Duke of the Abruzzi, replaced by Jean-Antoine Carrel Hut, and converted in a museum.

== Sports ==
=== Alpine skiing ===
The ski area is very large and guarantees good snow quality during the season, being at a high altitude (2,050 m to 3,500 m).

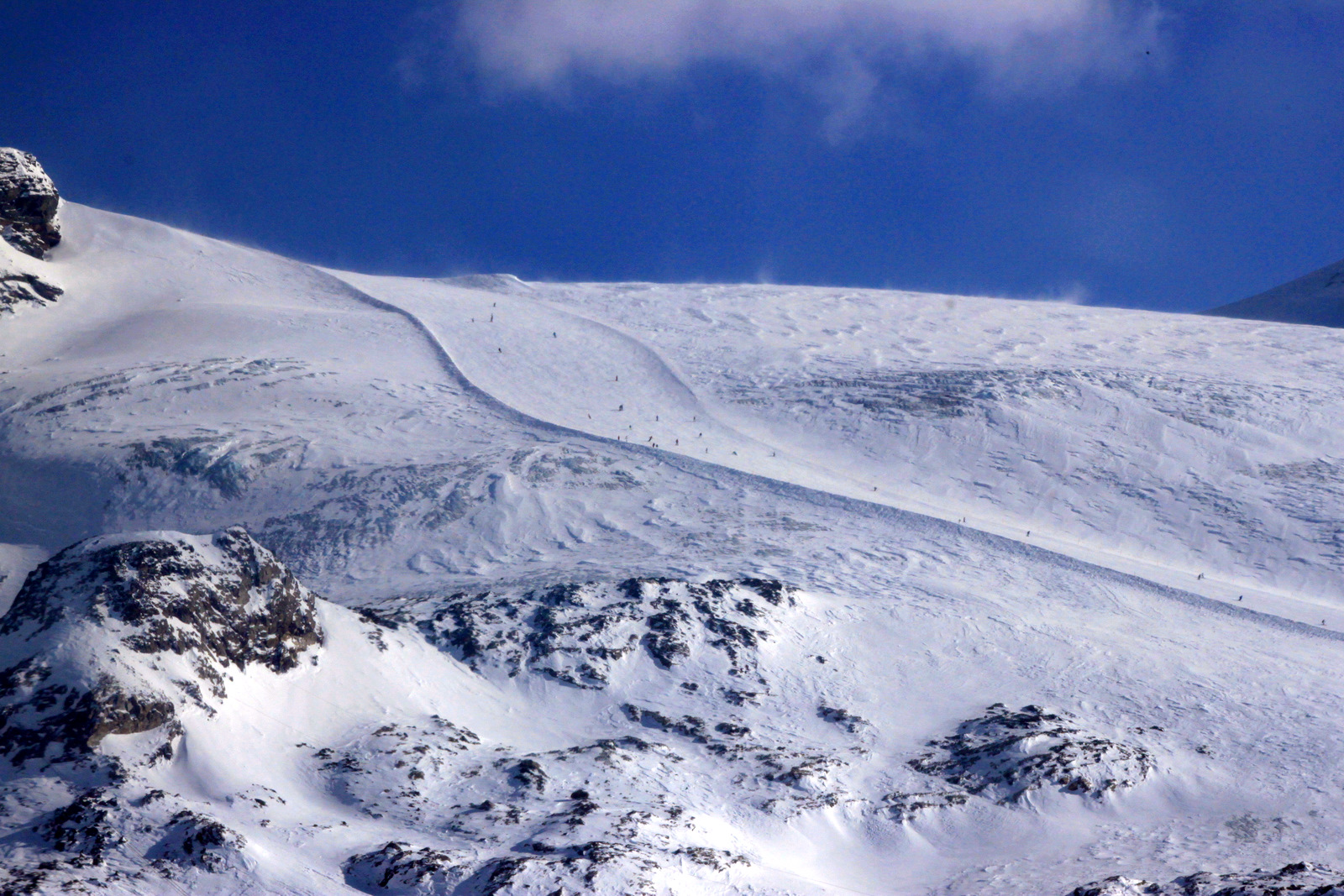
The Ventina slope

Breuil-Cervinia is connected, weather permitting, with Zermatt (when the Italian lifts are open) via the Plateau Rosa glacier, where summer skiing is also practised, and with the part of the Valtournenche ski resort via the Cime Bianche mountain pass.

Breuil-Cervinia hosted the Women's Alpine Ski World Cup in the 1977–1978 season on 10 December 1977, the first time in the history of the alpine resort, with a slalom stage on the Cielo Alto slope. The competition was won by French skier Perrine Pelen, followed by her compatriot Fabienne Serrat and Hanni Wenzel, who won the general and the slalom rankings for the season.

From the 2022–2023 season, Breuil-Cervinia and Zermatt (Switzerland) will host a cross-border stage of the Alpine Ski World Cup. This will be the first time in the history of the Cup. The races to be held will be downhill and super-g, both men's and women's. The designated slope is the Gran Becca, the result of a mixture of several slopes in the Matterhorn Ski Paradise resort: the athletes will start from the 3,899 m of the Gobba di Rollin, a mountain in Swiss territory, will take the Ventina slope, in Italian territory, and will arrive near the Cime Bianche Laghi - Plateau Rosa cable car station. The name Gran Becca is Matterhorn in Valdôtain dialect.

A special and spectacular event related to alpine skiing in Breuil-Cervinia was Azzurrissimo, a skiing competition held on the Ventina slope, 11 kilometres long and delimited by the symbolic number of 100 gates. Ski clubs, sports centres, military sports groups, but also ordinary people, show business people, journalists and athletes took part in the event. The spirit of the competition was based on the confrontation of all against all on skis, mixing the different disciplines of alpine skiing in a single event. It became an international event, with the participation of athletes from different nations and the creation of a network of events twinned with Azzurrissimo in Crans-Montana and Baqueira-Beret. The first edition of Azzurrissimo was in 1987 and the tenth and last was in 1998. It was run in the first few days of May, at the end of the racing season and at the end of the various championships. This allowed the presence of big names in the discipline and the awarding of the prize for the "fastest ski club in Italy".

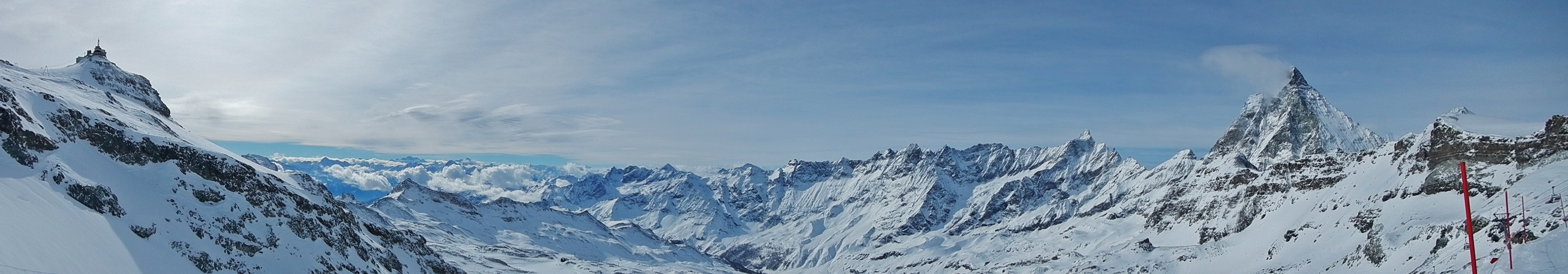

=== Cross-country skiing ===
In winter Breuil-Cervinia hosts a cross-country skiing trail on the plains near the town centre.

=== Snowboard cross ===
Breuil-Cervinia has hosted the Snowboard Cross World Cup four times, in the 2018, 2019, 2020 and 2022 seasons, making it a fixed stop on the circuit. Breuil-Cervinia was also supposed to host a stage in the 2021 season, which was cancelled due to the Coronavirus pandemic.

=== Cycling ===
Breuil-Cervinia has hosted a stage of the most famous cycling race in Italy Tour of Italy five times, in 1960, 1997, 2012, 2015 and 2018.

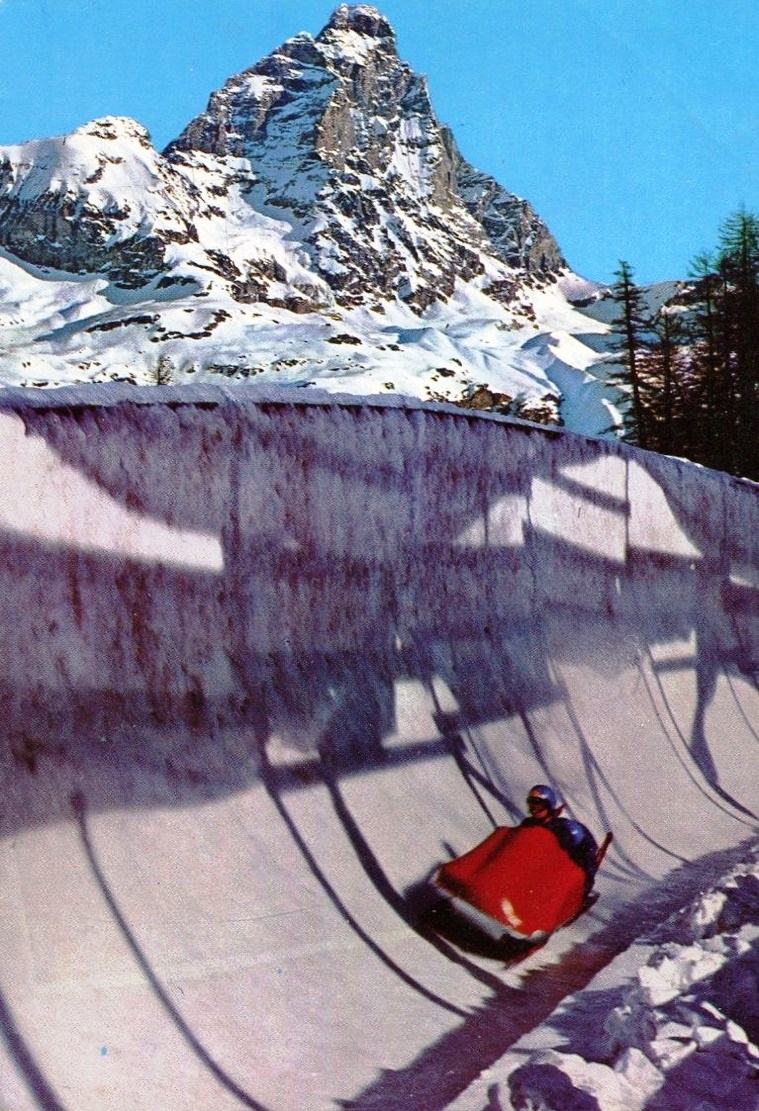
Lac Bleu bobsleigh run

The streets of Breuil-Cervinia have also hosted several editions of the Aosta Valley - Mont Blanc Tour, an event dedicated to the under-23s road cyclists and which has launched many internationally renowned cyclists such as Ivan Gotti and Fabio Aru.

In summer, downhill biking can be practised on equipped trails. The Maxiavalanche competition, which is organised around August and consists of a descent from the 3500 m of the Plateau Rosa glacier to Breuil-Cervinia, is well known. In 2011, two more tracks were added, bringing the number of downhill and freeride tracks to four. As of 2014, the number of trails is nine, including those that run towards the village of Valtournenche. The resort is relying heavily on this activity to boost summer tourism.

=== Bobsleigh ===
The "Lac Bleu" bobsleigh run was located in Breuil-Cervinia and hosted the World Championships three times: in 1971, 1975 and 1985; it also hosted the European Championships on four occasions: in 1969, 1973, 1987 and 1991. In 1991, it was definitively closed down due to the very high running costs and the cost of renovations that the track would have had to undergo.

The bobsleigh track could have been an Olympic facility on two occasions: first, when the city of Aosta was bidding to host the 18th Winter Olympics in 1998, which was then awarded to the city of Nagano. The second was when the facility was considered for the bobsleigh, skeleton and luge competitions of the XX Winter Olympics in Turin in 2006, but the choice was made to build the Olympic facility in Cesana Pariol.

=== Speed skiing ===
Breuil-Cervinia was the scene of several editions of speed skiing competitions. The slope was often the only one on the circuit that allowed new records to be set in the discipline.

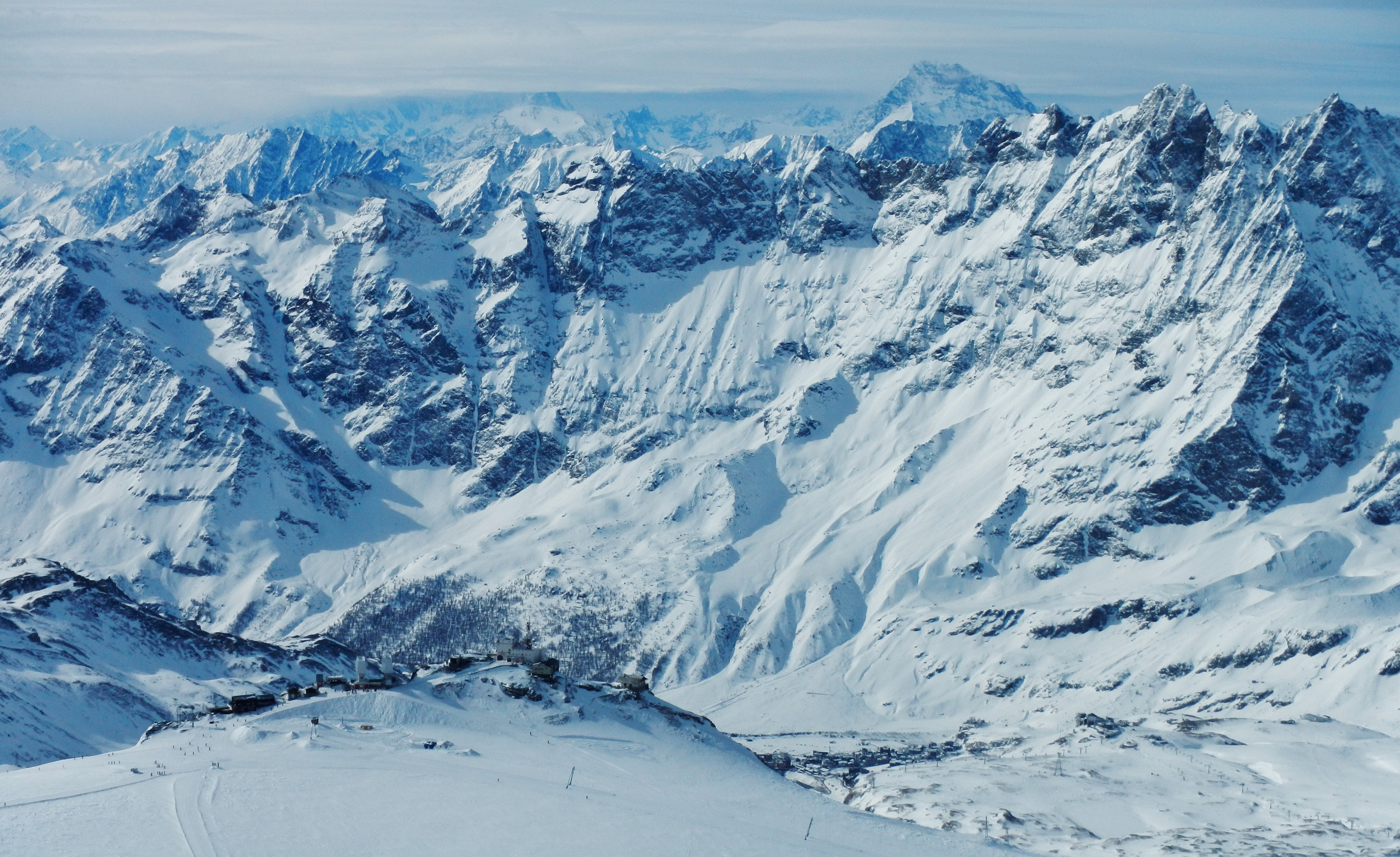
Plateau Rosa and Breuil-Cervinia from Klein Matterhorn

Zeno Colò set a record of 159.291 km/h here in 1947 that stood for 13 years, using normal skis and skiing without a helmet. Even Steve McKinney, the first person to break 200 km/h on skis, ran speed skiing competitions in Breuil-Cervinia.

In 2005, the Speed Skiing World Championships were held in Breuil-Cervinia.

=== Ski touring ===
Ski touring in Breuil-Cervinia began before ski lifts were built. Ski tourers started from Breuil-Cervinia, traveled to Plan Maison, and reached Plateau Rosa before descending into the valley.

Breuil-Cervinia, together with Gressoney-La-Trinité, hosts one of the oldest and most historic ski touring competitions: the Mezzalama Trophy.

=== Golf ===
Cervinia is home to the Cervino Golf Club, which is among the highest golf courses in Europe.

== Events ==
Since 1998, Breuil-Cervinia hosts the Cervino CineMountain, a film festival focusing on mountain, adventure, exploring and nature documentaries. Cervino CineMountain is a member of the International Alliance for Mountain Film and awards the Oscar for the best mountain film from the various mountain film festivals that are members of the Alliance. The Cervino CineMountain also awards Grand Prizes, prizes for feature, medium and short films and for animated films.

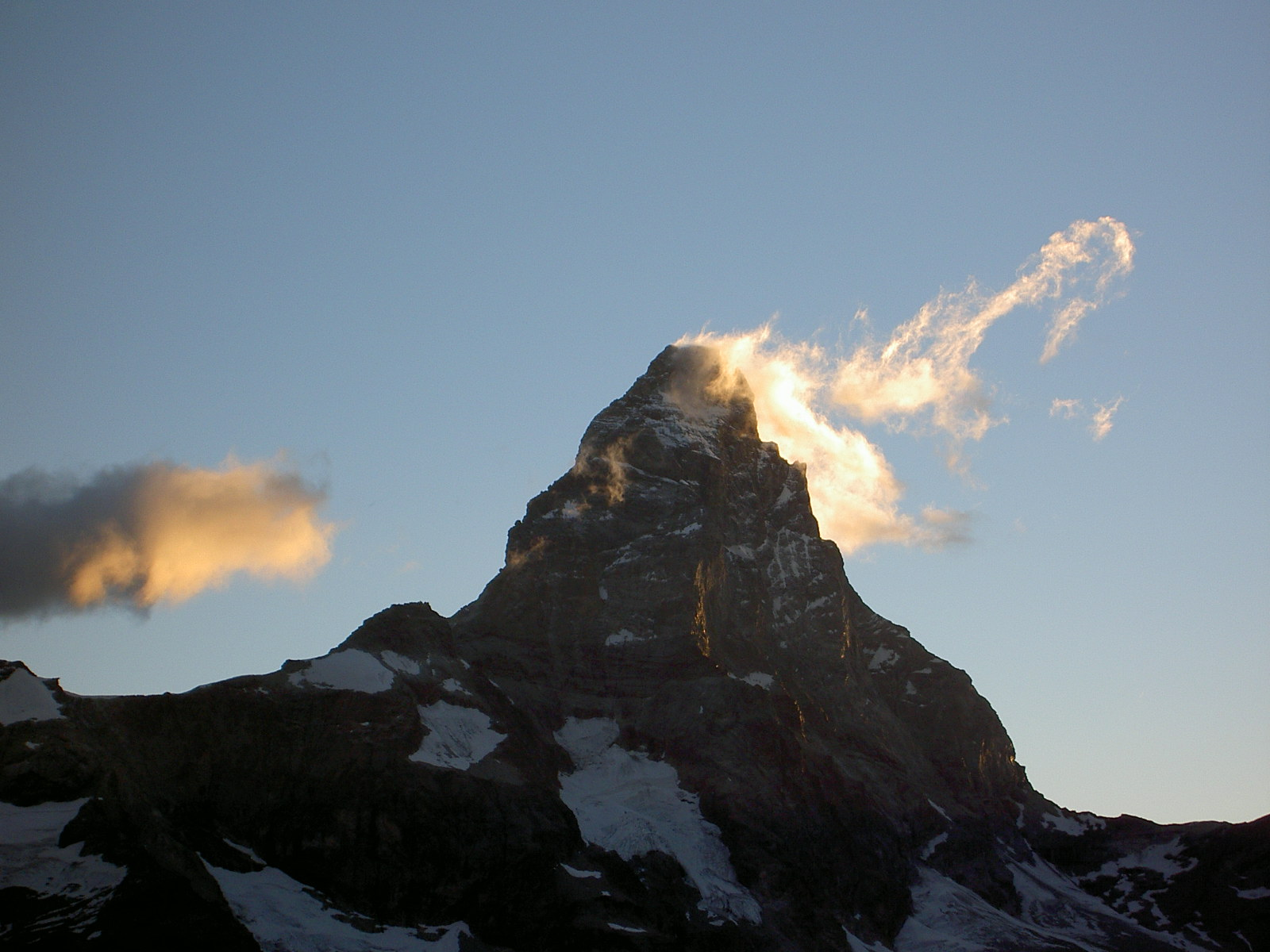

Since 2019, in the month of July, Breuil-Cervinia hosts La Settimana del Cervino, an event that encourages contact with nature, environmental sustainability and respect for the mountain environment with a series of cultural meetings between people from the entertainment industry, athletes, experts on the subject of mountains and nature, as well as evening shows, concerts and walks aimed at raising awareness of the aforementioned subjects around the village of Breuil-Cervinia.
