= Furggen =

Mountain of the Pennine Alps

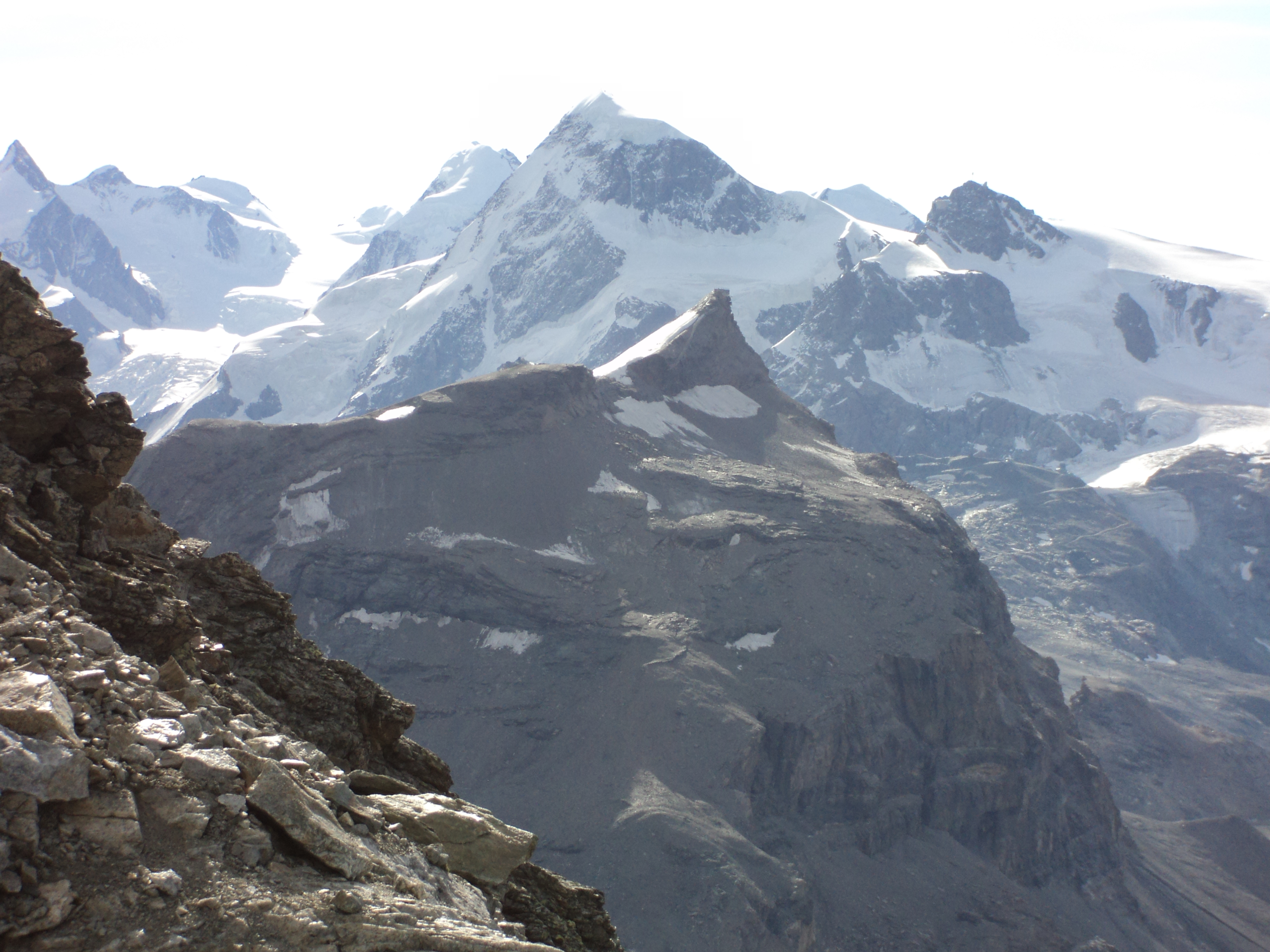
- View of the Furggen with the Breithorn in the background

Highest point
- Elevation: 3,492 m (11,457 ft)
- Prominence: 197 m (646 ft)
- Parent peak: Monte Rosa
- Coordinates: 45°57′25″N 07°40′53″E

Geography
- Location within Alps
- Location: Valais, Switzerland; Aosta Valley, Italy
- Parent range: Pennine Alps

The Furggen (3,492 m) is a mountain of the Pennine Alps, located on the border between Italy (Aosta Valley) and Switzerland (Valais). It is the culminating point of the ridge named Furgggrat stretching from the Furggjoch (3,271 m) to the Theodul Pass (3,295 m), and is located halfway between the Matterhorn and Testa Grigia.

The peak is the site of the now abandoned cable car station. Construction on the cable car began in the summer of 1950 - with the station on the Furggen summit designed by Carlo Mollino - and the lift opened to the public on 25 December 1952. The lift had a single span of 2,887m long - making it the world's longest at the time of its opening. The car could hold 25 passengers and transport 240 people per hour. The lift between Plan Maison and Furggen was designed as part of a system of cable cars reaching from Breuil-Cervinia to the Matterhorn, with leg one running from Breuil-Cervinia to Plan Maison (opened on 4 March 1939). Leg 2 running from Plan Maison up to the summit of Furggen, and leg 3 reaching the top of the Matterhorn. The final leg was never constructed, partly as a result of the large cost and due to environmental opposition. The leg between Plan Maison and Furggen was abandoned in 1993 after ice brought down the cables and they were never replaced. The station on the summit of Furggen is now abandoned, but the leg between Breuil-Cervinia and Plan Maison is still in place.

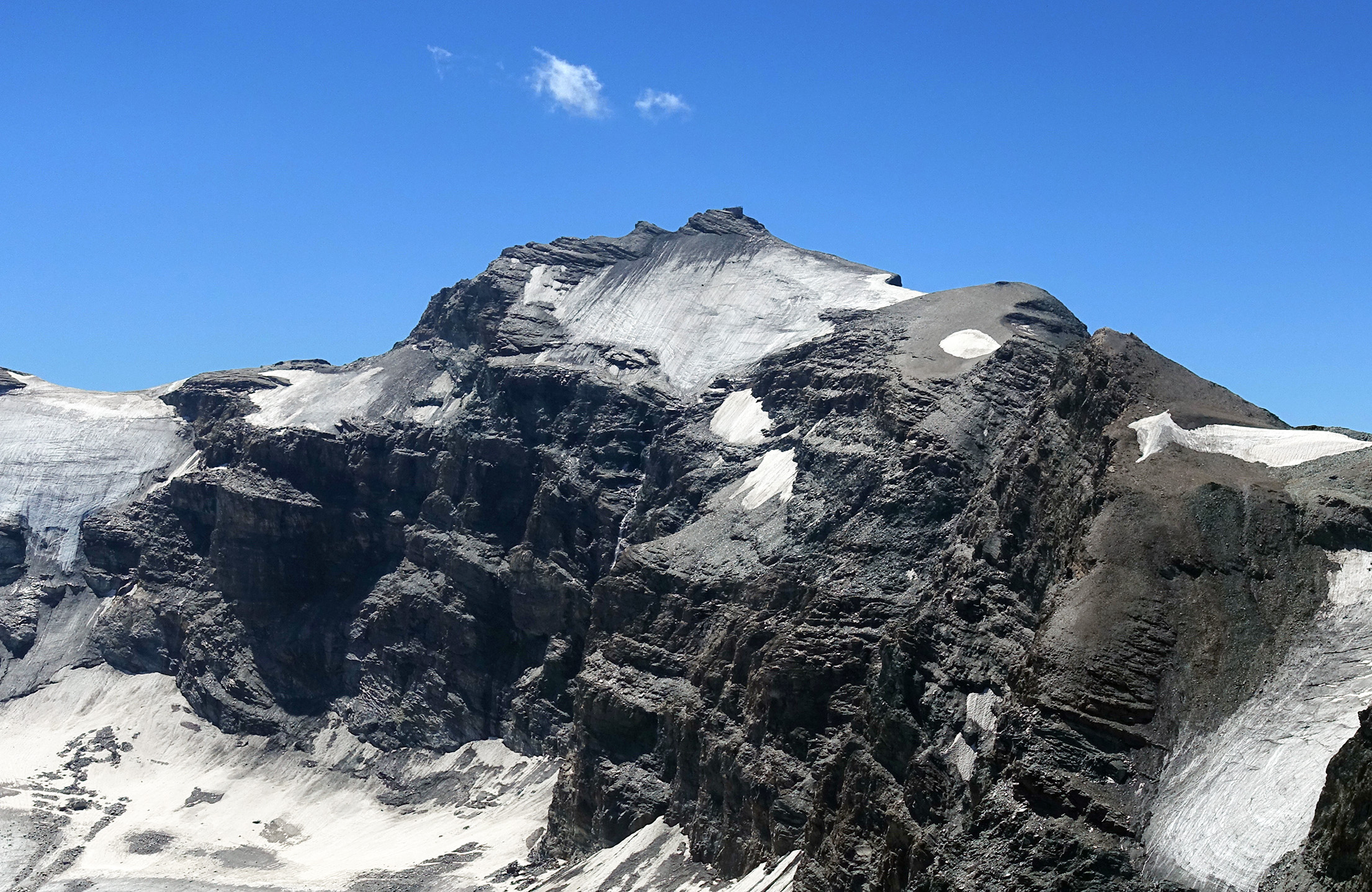
Furggen

== See also ==
- List of buildings and structures above 3000 m in Switzerland
