= Cervino Golf Club =

Golf course in Breuil-Cervinia, Italy

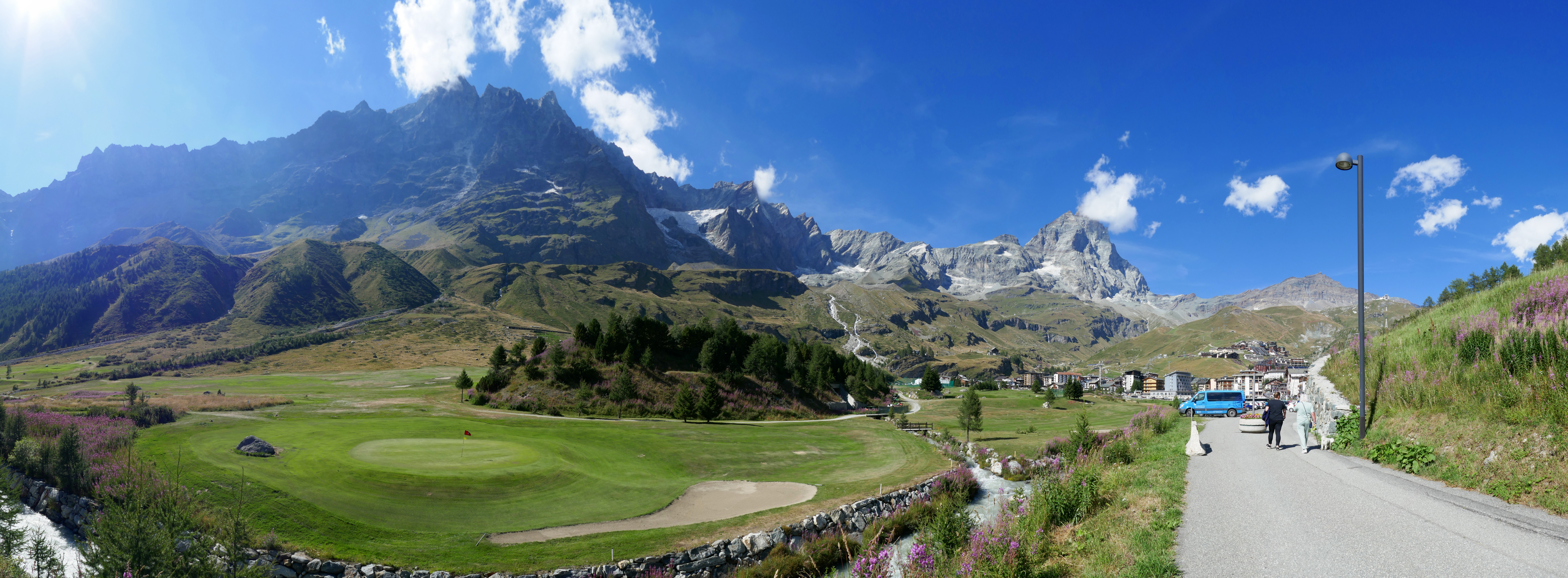
- Cervino Golf Club in 2022
- Interactive map of Cervino Golf Club
- 45°55′49.6″N 7°37′25.32″E

Club information
- Location: Breuil-Cervinia, Italy
- Established: 1955
- Tota holes: 18
- Designed by: Donald Harradine; Luigi Rota Caremoli
- Par: 69

The Cervino Golf Club (Italian: Golf Club del Cervino, French: Club de golf du Cervin) is a golf course located in Breuil-Cervinia, in the Aosta Valley, Italy.

== History ==
The golf course, designed by architect Donald Harradine, was built in the early 1950s and inaugurated in 1955. In 2008, the course, which originally had 9 holes, was expanded to 18 holes according to the design of the architect Luigi Rota Caremoli.

== Description ==
The course, located in Breuil-Cervinia at 2,050 meters above sea level in a high-altitude landscape beside the Marmore stream and at the foot of the Matterhorn (Italian: Monte Cervino), is one of the highest golf courses in Europe.

It is an 18-hole course, PAR 69, approximately 5,300 meters long. The clubhouse, built of stone and wood, hosts the main services for players.

== Gallery ==
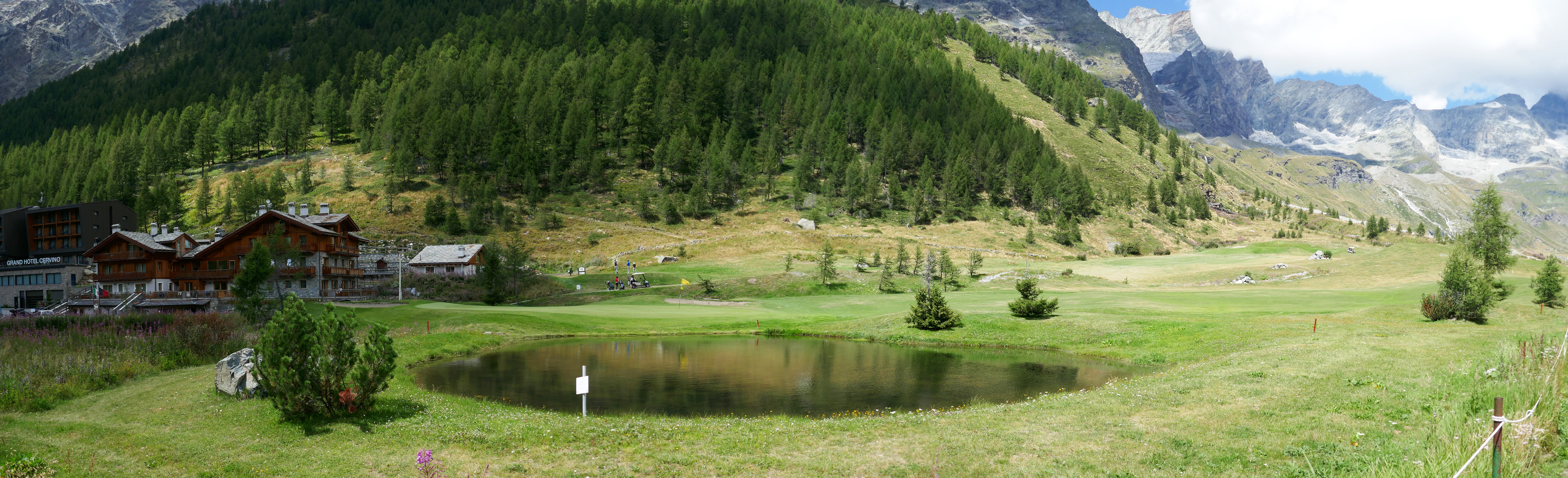

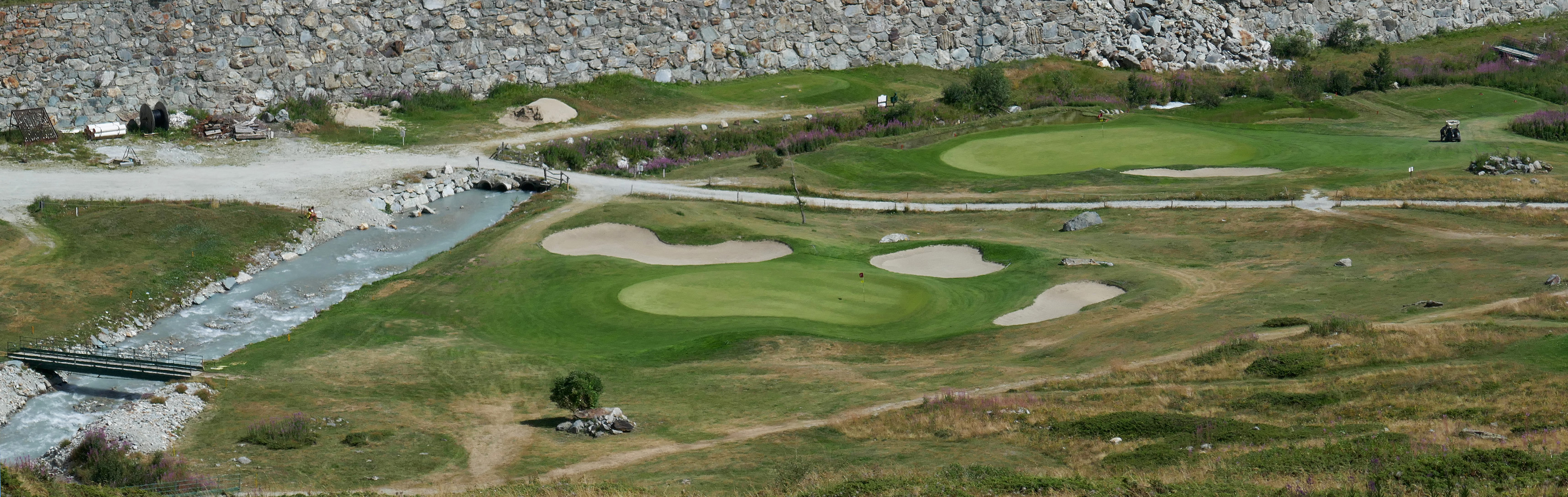

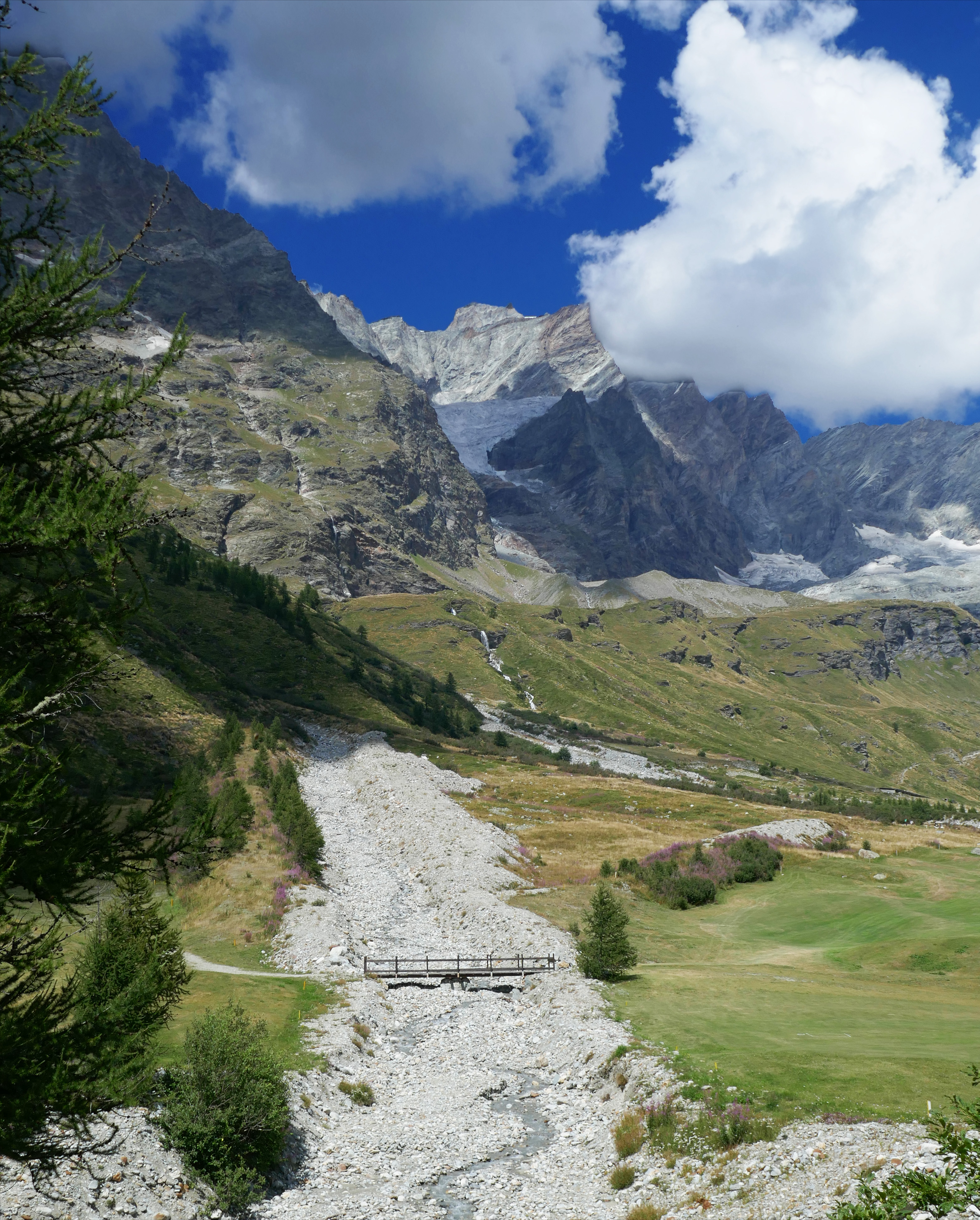
