= Refuge Duc des Abruzzes à l'Oriondé =

Coordinates: 45°57′33″N 7°38′38″E

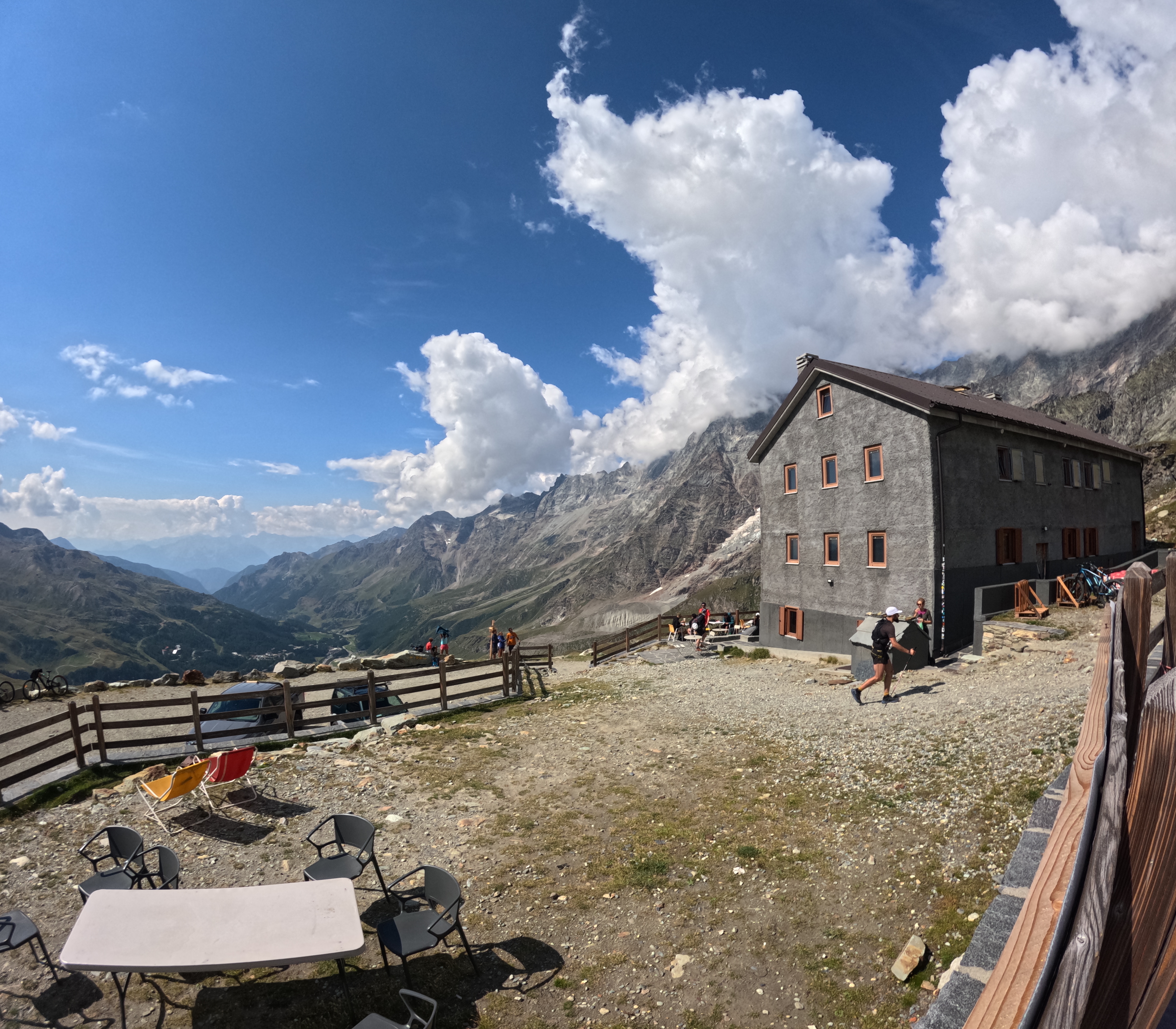
Rifugio Duca degli Abruzzi all'Oriondé - Valtournenche - Aosta Valley - Italy

Refuge Duc des Abruzzes à l'Oriondé is a refuge located above Breuil-Cervinia in the Aosta Valley. The refuge lies on the south side of the Matterhorn, at a height of 2,802 metres. It is used for the ascent of the Italian normal route.
