= Maria Regina Vallis Augustanae, Valtournenche =

Maria Regina Vallis Augustanae
- Santa Maria Regina della Valle d'Aosta (Italian); Sainte Marie Reine de la Vallée d'Aoste (French)
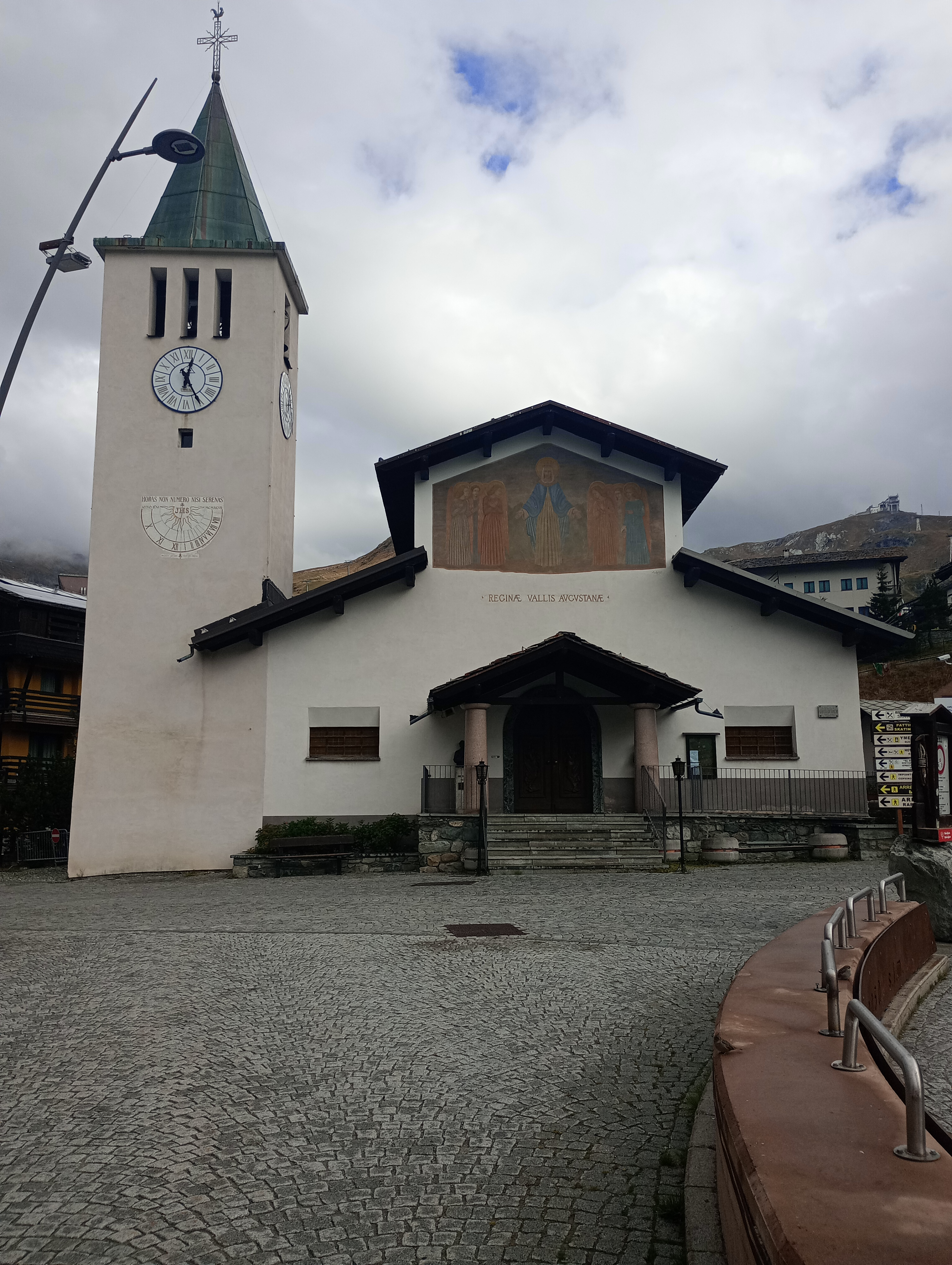
- Maria Regina Vallis Augustanæ church, Valtournenche in 2023
- Click on the map for a fullscreen view
- 45°56′05.06″N 7°37′52.27″E
- Country: Italy
- Denomination: Roman Catholic

Architecture
- Functional status: Active

Administration
- Diocese: Diocese of Aosta

Maria Regina Vallis Augustanæ (Italian: Chiesa di Maria Regina della Valle d'Aosta; French: Sainte Marie Reine de la Vallée d'Aoste) is a Roman Catholic church located in Breuil-Cervinia, Valtournenche, Italy.

== History ==
The church was built in 1955.

== Description ==
The interior houses two wooden bas-reliefs, works of the school of Fra Angelico, depicting Mary and the Child, and Bernard of Menthon, the patron saint of mountaineers and mountain dwellers.

The church features a three-nave structure with a bell tower. Flanking the portal are two bronze busts dedicated to prominent figures of the local community: Father Vietto and Father Sterpone, the latter remembered for his 40-year tenure as parish priest of Breuil-Cervinia.
