= Teatro Regio (Turin) =

Opera house in Italy

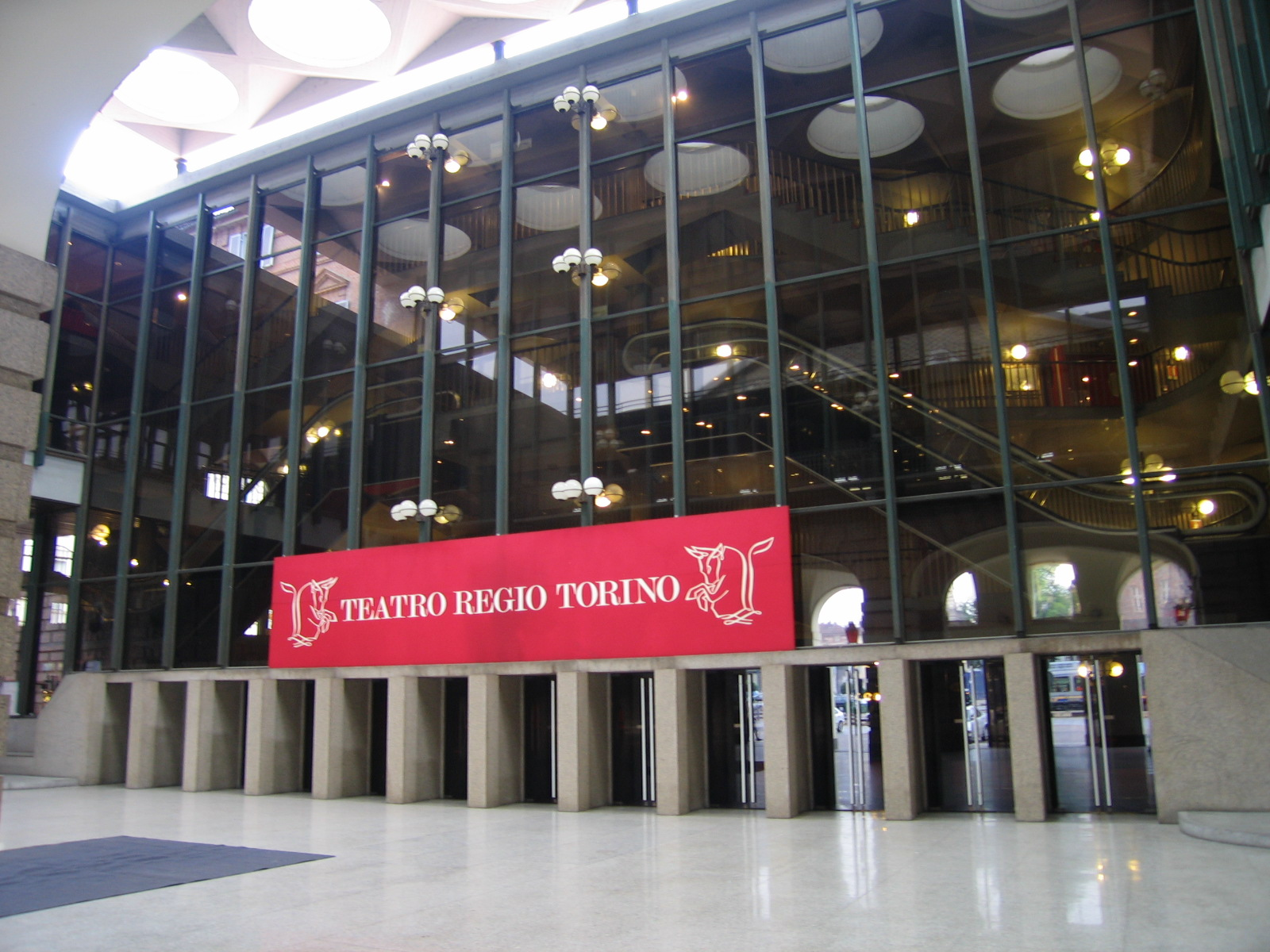
- Interactive map of Teatro Regio
- Address: Turin, Piedmont; Italy
- Coordinates: 45°4′14″N 7°41′16″E
- Owner: City of Turin
- Capacity: 1500
- Designation: Opera house

Construction
- Opened: 1740
- Reopened: 1973
- Architects: Filippo Juvarra; Carlo Mollino

Website
- www.teatroregio.torino.it/en

The Teatro Regio (Royal Theatre) is a prominent opera house and opera company in Turin, Piedmont, Italy. Its season runs from October to June with the presentation of eight or nine operas given from five to twelve performances of each.

Several buildings provided venues for operatic productions in Turin from the mid-16th century, but it was not until 1713 that a proper opera house was considered, and under the architect Filippo Juvarra planning began. However, the cornerstone was not laid until the reign of Charles Emmanuel III in 1738 after Juvarra's death. The work was supervised by Benedetto Alfieri until the theatre was completed and decorated by Bernardino Galliari.

Giacomo Puccini premiered his La Bohème in 1896 in the Teatro Regio.

== Teatro Regio, 1740 to 1936 ==
The Teatro Regio (Royal Theatre) was inaugurated on 26 December 1740 with Francesco Feo's Arsace. It was a sumptuously built facility, seating 1,500 and with 139 boxes located on five tiers plus a gallery.

However, the theatre was closed on royal order in 1792 and it became a warehouse. With the French occupation of Turin during the Napoleonic War the theatre was renamed the Teatro Nazionale and finally, after Napoleon's ascent to Emperor, renamed again as the Teatro Imperiale. Napoleon's fall in 1814 saw the theatre returned to its original name, the Regio. In the following years the opera house went through several periods of financial crisis and it was taken over by the city in 1870.

Other theatres were built and presented seasons of opera in Turin. Among them was the restored Teatro Carignano in 1824. It too was acquired by the municipality in 1932 and, after the destruction by fire of the Teatro Regio in 1936, the Carignano was to serve as the main venue for opera in the city until the Regio reopened in 1973.

Even before it burnt down, discussions about whether to rebuild the Regio or create a brand new theatre preoccupied Turin in the early twentieth century. Two plans were presented and the one selected expanded the seating capacity to 2,415 by removing the fourth and fifth levels of boxes and creating a huge amphitheatre. Work was completed in 1905 but the theatre closed during the First World War and re-opened in 1919. Until February 1936, seasons of opera were presented until fire destroyed all but the facade of the Teatro Regio. It remained closed for thirty-seven years. Arturo Toscanini was the conductor of the Turin Opera from 1895 to 1898, during which time several productions of the works of Wagner were given Italian premieres.

== Rebuilt Teatro Regio after 1973 ==
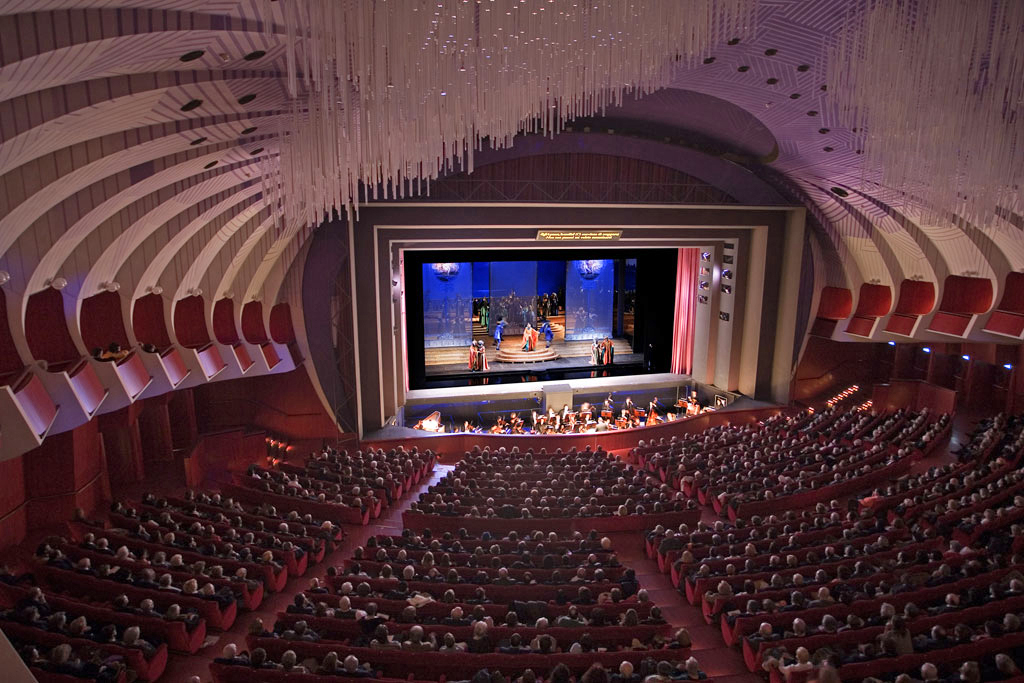
The theatre in 2005

Following the fire, a national competition was launched to find an architect. However, with the war and the overall financial situation, the foundation stone was not laid until 25 September 1963. Even then, work did not start until September 1967 under architect Carlo Mollino.

The rebuilt theatre, with its striking contemporary interior design but hidden behind the original facade, was inaugurated on 10 April 1973 with a production of Verdi's I vespri siciliani directed by Maria Callas and Giuseppe Di Stefano.

The new house seats 1,750 and is elliptical in shape with a large orchestra level and 37 boxes around its perimeter. An acoustic shell was added to improve its sound.

The house presents a wide range of operas during its seasons, including contemporary works, although in the first years of the new century financial pressures have made the programming somewhat more conservative and favoring more 19th-century operas.

== Facade ==
The building's outer facade is made with a unique brickwork pattern using custom cut bricks to create a relief of stars which seems to overlap itself continuously like fishscales. The shadows created by the protruding parts and the complex pattern reinforces this illusion.

The facade of the Teatro Regio is one of the Piedmontese buildings that are part of the UNESCO World Heritage Site.

== See also ==
- Category:Opera world premieres at the Teatro Regio (Turin)
