= Refuge du Théodule =

Refuge in the Pennine Alps

Coordinates: 45°56′39″N 7°42′30″E

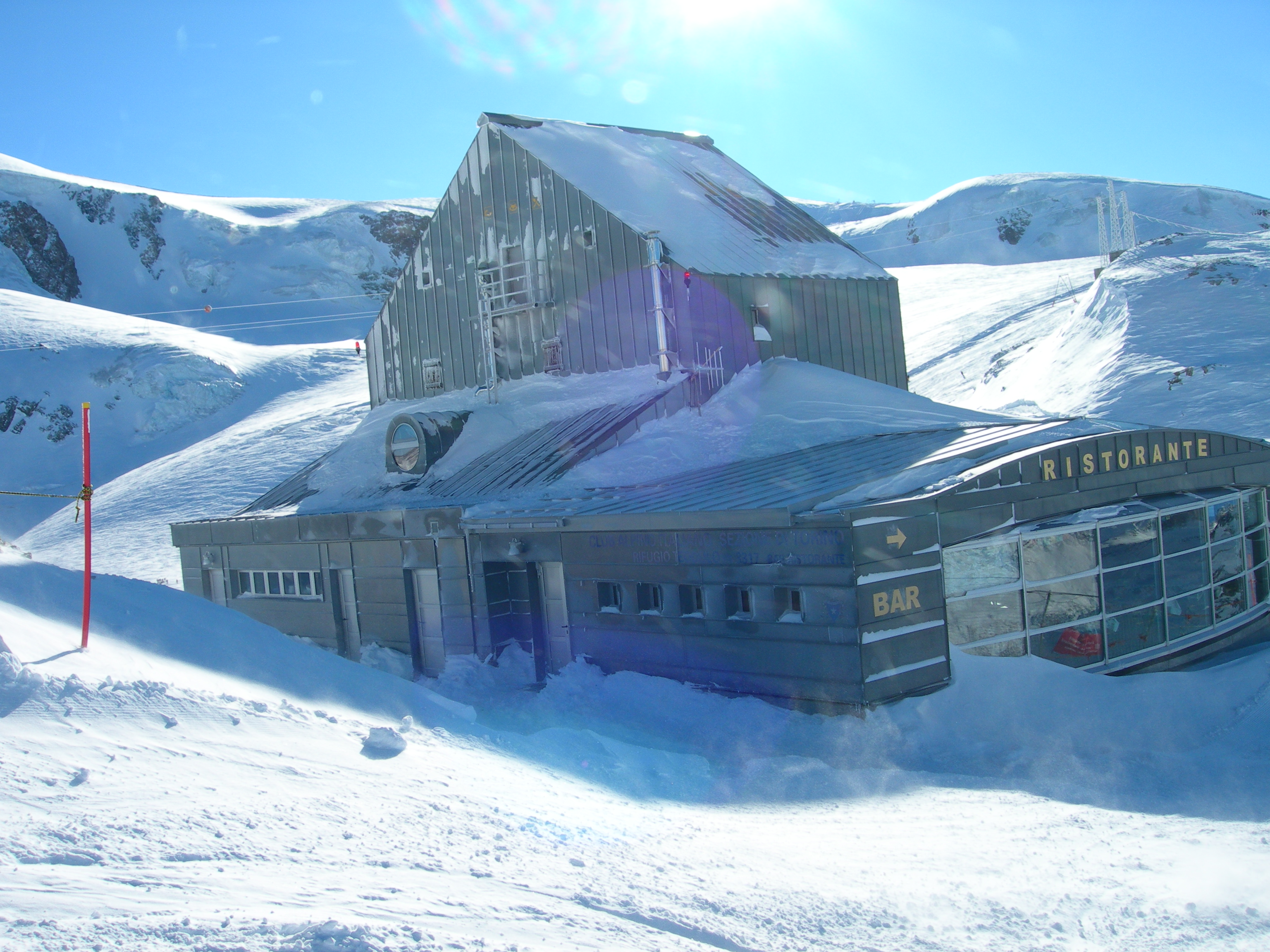
Refuge du Théodule

Refuge du Théodule is a refuge in the Pennine Alps located at the Theodulpass between the Mattertal and Valtournanche in the Aosta Valley, Italy.
