= Carlo Mollino =

Italian architect, designer, and photographer (1905–1973)

- Born: 6 May 1905; Turin, Italy
- Died: 27 August 1973 (aged 68); Turin, Italy
- Education: Royal Superior School of Architecture, Turin
- Occupations: Architect; designer; photographer
- Known for: Teatro Regio di Torino; Slittovia del Lago Nero; furniture design
- Parent: Eugenio Mollino (father)

Carlo Mollino (6 May 1905 – 27 August 1973) was an Italian architect, designer, and photographer based in Turin. He worked across architecture, interior design, furniture, photography, and writing, and also designed a racing car and competed in aerobatic flying.

Mollino's architecture combined Alpine vernacular traditions with modernist engineering and surrealist ideas. His buildings include the Slittovia del Lago Nero (1946–47), the Camera di Commercio di Torino (1965–73), and the Teatro Regio di Torino (1965–73). He also wrote prose fiction, criticism, and a volume on photography history, Il Messaggio dalla Camera Oscura (1949).

His furniture, designed as components of complete interiors rather than standalone objects, has commanded high prices on the international art and design market. After his death, hundreds of nude photographs were discovered, taken between 1956 and 1973 in private studios on the Turin hillside.

== Early life and education ==
Carlo Mollino was born on 6 May 1905 in Turin, Italy. He was the only son of Jolanda Testa (1884–1966) and Eugenio Mollino (1873–1953), a civil engineer who built more than 300 buildings of various types.

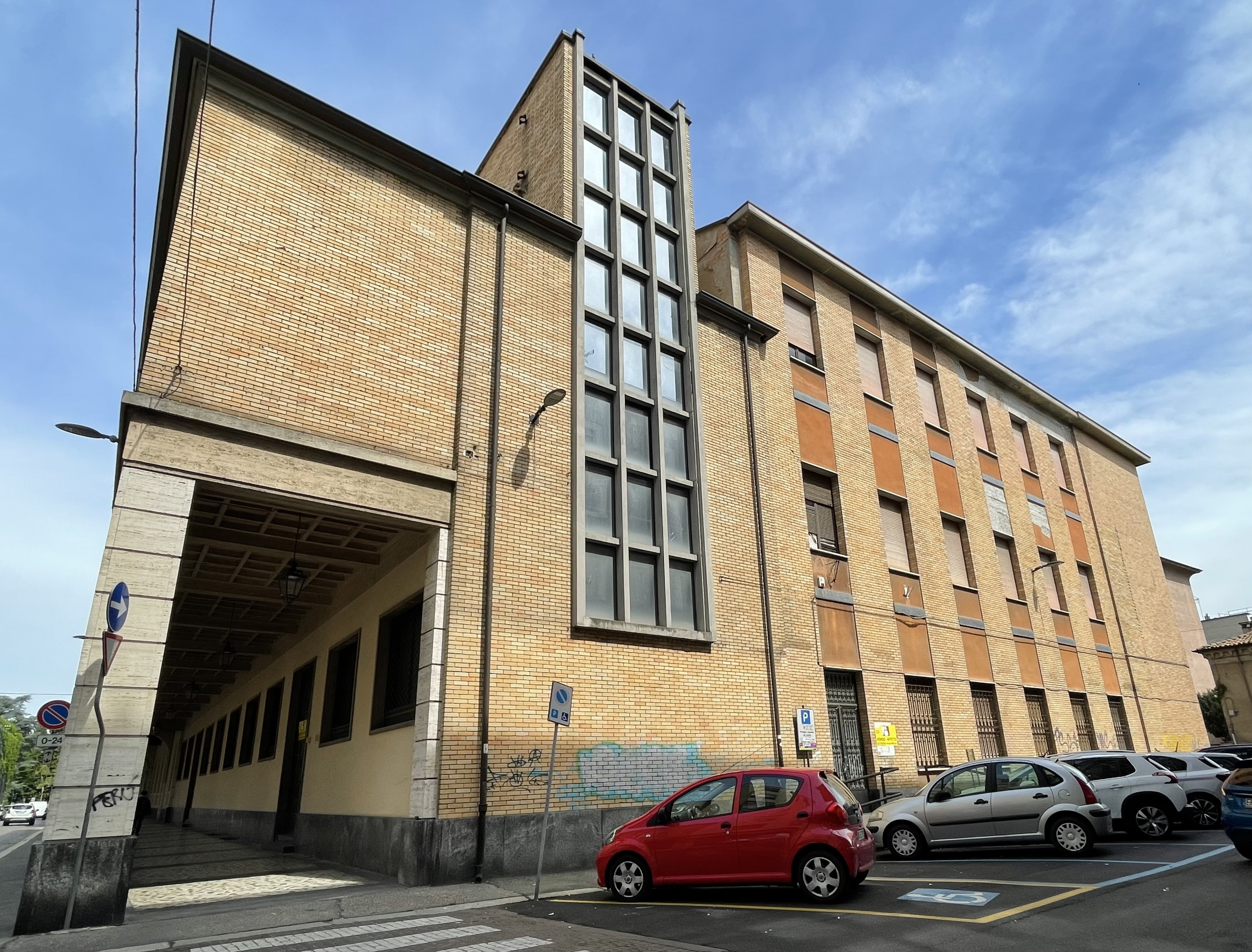
Casa del Fascio, Voghera (1934–39), designed with his father Eugenio Mollino

Mollino graduated in architecture in July 1931 from the Royal Superior School of Architecture in Turin. Before and after graduation, he collaborated with his father, who mentored him in technical architectural design and had him oversee construction sites. (Note: In his curriculum vitae, Carlo Mollino listed 13 buildings he collaborated to design and build with his father.) This apprenticeship gave him command of building technologies, materials, and every stage of construction.

== Architecture ==
Mollino designed a number of buildings in Turin, including the Faculty of Architecture at the Politecnico di Torino. He produced working drawings for the doors and windows of most of his buildings.

Mollino understood architecture as a form of expressive language rather than a purely academic field. He frequently combined traditional building knowledge with experimental structures, drawing inspiration from Alpine building traditions. He was drawn to complexity rather than simplicity.

=== Early work and influences ===
In summer 1931, shortly after graduating from architecture school in Turin, Mollino travelled to Berlin, where he met Erich Mendelsohn. This direct contact with Expressionism had a lasting impact on his work, visible in the first building he completed, the Sede Federazione Agricoltori (transl. Farmers' Federation) in Cuneo (1933–35).

In 1933, Mollino published a multi-part short story entitled Vita di Oberon (transl. The Life of Oberon) in the architectural journal Casabella. Written as prose fiction, it served as a personal manifesto of his architectural approach. With this manifesto, which bears traces of Futurism from a youthful infatuation, Mollino began a creative journey in which he would consistently combine the roles of architect and storyteller.

In 1934, Mollino began to explore Surrealism, a movement that remained a constant source of fascination throughout his life. In August, he published his second short story, L'amante del duca (transl. The Duke's Lover, 1934–36), a dreamlike fiction whose protagonist is the imaginary architect Faust.

The Società Ippica Torinese (transl. Horse Riding Club of Turin, 1937–40) is Mollino's first masterpiece and his first opportunity to give shape to a modern surrealist architecture that extended his interior designs and furniture of the 1930s, aiming to "move the concepts of surreal interior space towards an intransigently functional unity".

=== Wartime theory ===
In 1941, Mollino published an article about the Turinese architect-engineer Alessandro Antonelli, made famous by his towering Mole. The article reveals Mollino's growing interest in the "organic," understood not as a reference to Frank Lloyd Wright but as the structures of animal and plant organisms as sources of inspiration for designs ranging from coat hangers to buildings. In those same years, Mollino theorised a new form of "synthetic eclecticism" (Note: Mollino writes several times about this "eclecticism", the first one in the 1943 typescript of his book Il Messaggio dalla Camera Oscura. The book will be published only in 1949 by Chiantore, with the paragraph on eclecticism being on page 92. A second description of this eclecticism is published in Stile magazine, April 1944, p. 4 (translated in English in: Ferrari N. and Sabatino M., Carlo Mollino Architect and Storyteller, Park Books, 2021, p. 152.)) based on treating architecture as a language. During this period, dominated by the Second World War, Mollino wrote articles and books about art, architecture, photography, and skiing, always from the perspective of a practising designer.

=== Postwar buildings ===
As the war ended, he put his ideas into practice by designing the most influential of his buildings, the Slittovia del Lago Nero (transl. Lago Nero Sled Station, 1946–1947). Its structure combines cutting-edge Vierendeel trusses with a traditional interlocking log enclosure, creating an extraordinarily dynamic, three-dimensional building. Mollino called it a "flying chalet," inspired by the traditional Walser alpine architecture he had studied in summer 1930, producing detailed analytical drawings. (Note: This study is published in English in: Napoleone Ferrari, Mollino. Casa del Sole, AdArte, 2007, pp. 114–127.) The Slittovia del Lago Nero is part of a group of projects, including the unbuilt Casa Capriata (1945) and the Casa del Sole (1945–54) in Cervinia, inspired by traditional vernacular architecture reworked in modernist terms.

In 1945, together with the sculptor Umberto Mastroianni, Mollino won a competition for a war memorial, completed in 1947, for the Monumental Cemetery on the outskirts of Turin.

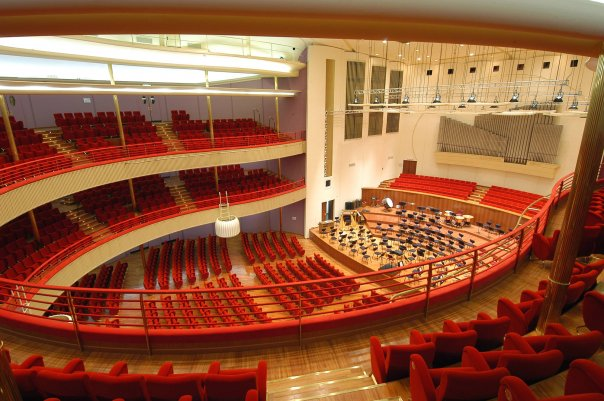
Interior of the RAI Auditorium, Turin (1950–52)

From 1949 until his death, Mollino taught at the Faculty of Architecture in Turin, becoming a full professor in 1953. In 1950, he won a competition to redesign the interior of Turin's RAI Auditorium within an existing building. In 1952, he designed the Casa Cattaneo overlooking Lake Maggiore; the two-story house is composed of a long, cantilevered beam supported at one end by two leg-shaped pillars, resembling an animal crouching on the lawn slope, ready to jump.

=== Later career ===
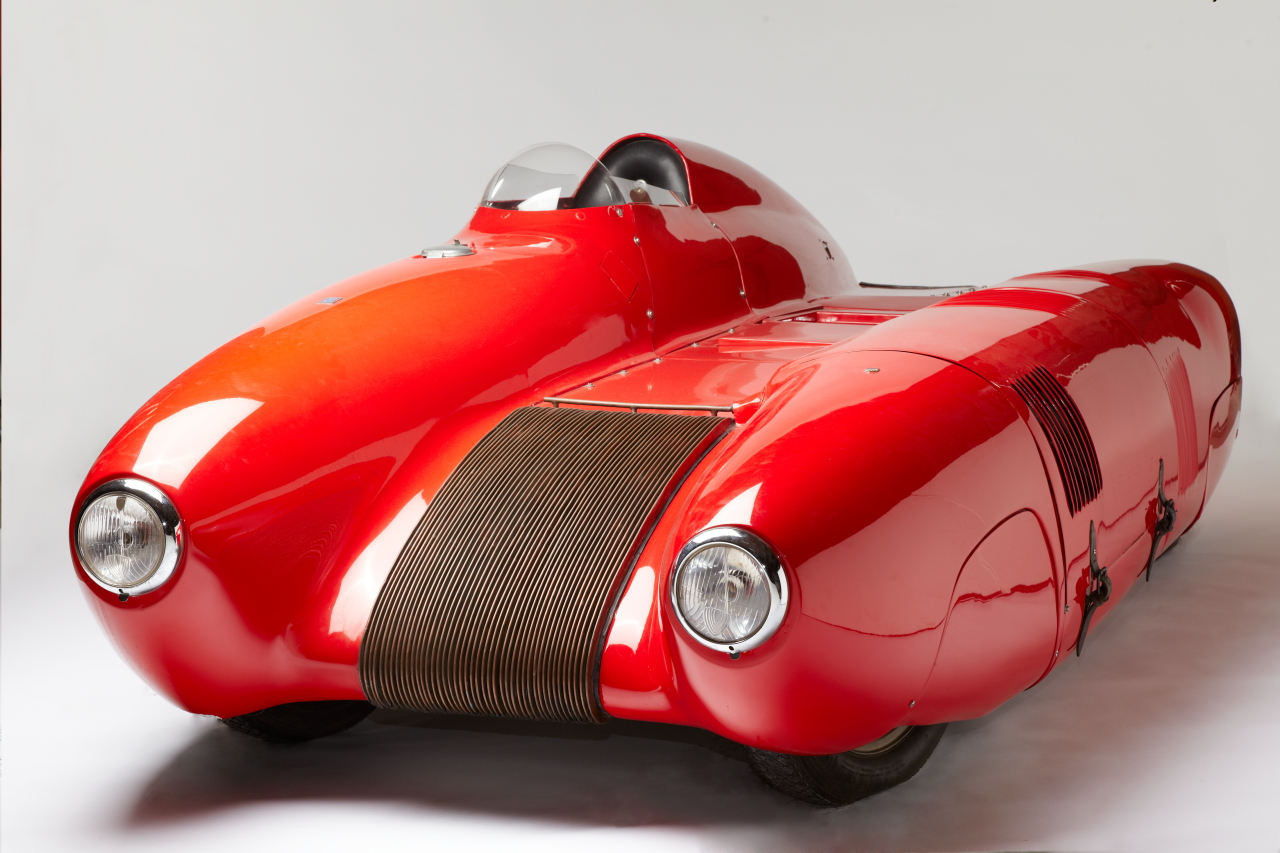
DaMolNar

The death of his father in December 1953 plunged Mollino into a personal crisis, leading him to abandon architecture for several years in favour of other pursuits. In 1955, he designed the DaMolNar, a car that competed that year in the 24 Hours of Le Mans. In 1956, he took up flying, specializing in aerobatics, and later competed in Italian and European competitions. He also turned to nude photography.

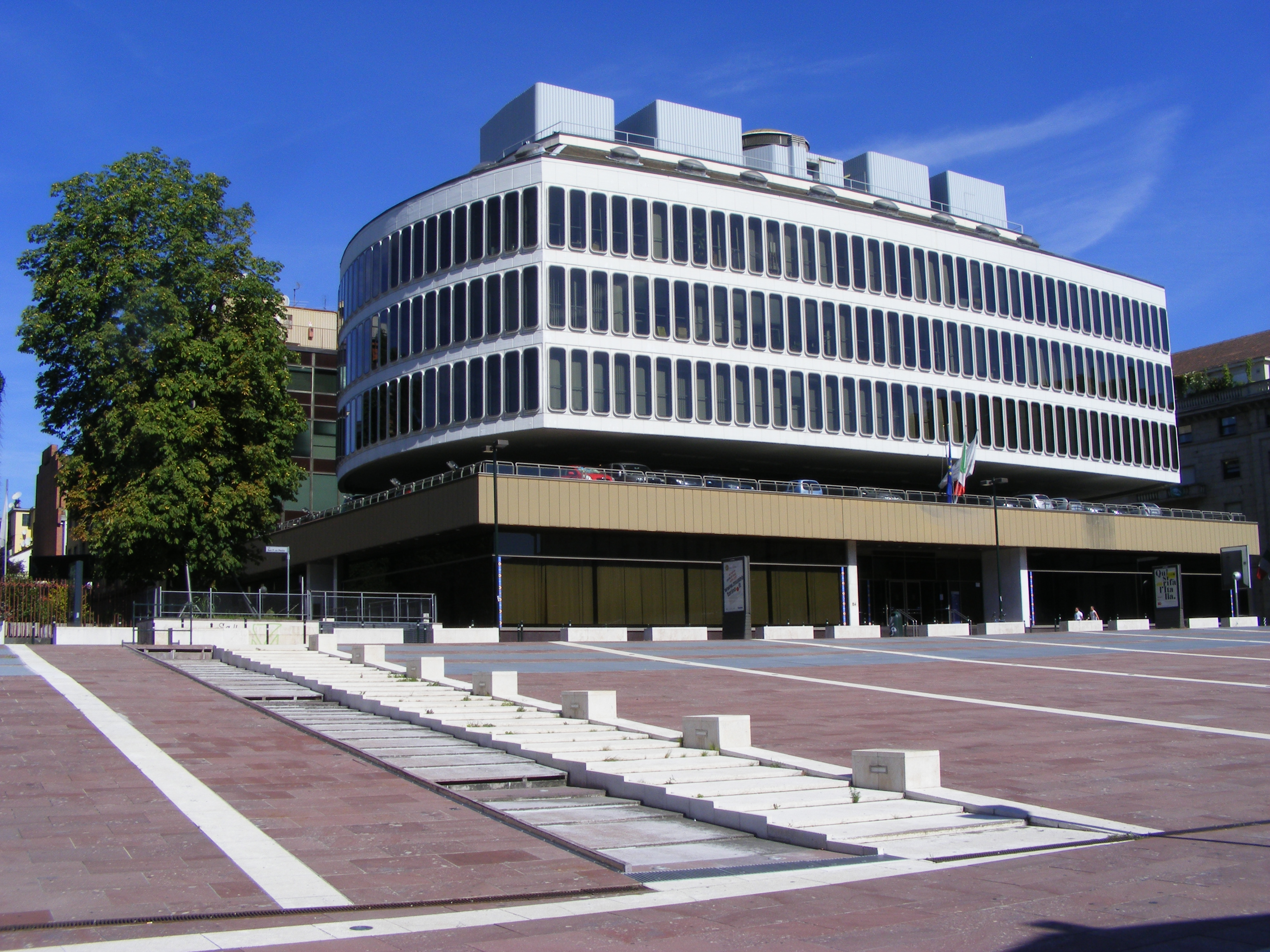
Camera di Commercio di Torino (1964–73), designed with Graffi, Galardi, and Migliasso

In 1959, he returned to architecture, entering the competition for an exhibition pavilion in Turin marking the centenary of Italy's unification. From this point on, his large-scale urban buildings, which remain in use today, are characterised by reinforced concrete structures. These include the Camera di Commercio di Torino (transl. Chamber of Commerce of Turin, 1965–73) and the Teatro Regio di Torino (transl. Regio Opera House, 1973). The Teatro Regio, an important part of the monumental Piazza Castello, offers fantastic spaces in which Mollino translates Piranesi's Prisons into a brutalist, curved, labyrinthine space on four levels that constitute the foyer.

=== Buildings ===
- Sede Federazione Agricoltori (transl. Offices of the Farmers' Federation, 1933–35, Cuneo, extant)
- Casa del Fascio (1934–39, Voghera, extant)
- Società Ippica Torinese (transl. Horse Riding Club of Turin, 1937–40, Turin, demolished in 1960)
- Monumento ai caduti per la libertà (transl. Monument to the Fallen, 1945–47, Turin monumental cemetery, extant)
- Casa del Sole (1945–54, Cervinia, extant)
- Slittovia del Lago Nero (transl. Lago Nero Sled Station, 1946–47, Sauze d'Oulx, extant)
- RAI Auditorium (1950–52, Turin, extant with major modifications)
- Casa Linot (1951–1952, Bardonecchia, extant)
- Casa ad alloggi sul Viale Maternità (transl. Apartment Building on Viale Maternità, 1951–1953, extant)
- Casa Cattaneo (1952, 1953, Agra, extant)
- Casa Olivero (1962, La Thuile, extant)
- Baita Taleuc (transl. Taleuc Rascard, 1963–65, Champoluc, extant)
- Camera di Commercio / Palazzo degli Affari (transl. Chamber of Commerce, 1964–73, Turin, extant)
- Teatro Regio di Torino (transl. Regio Opera House, 1965–73, Turin, extant)

== Interior design and furniture ==
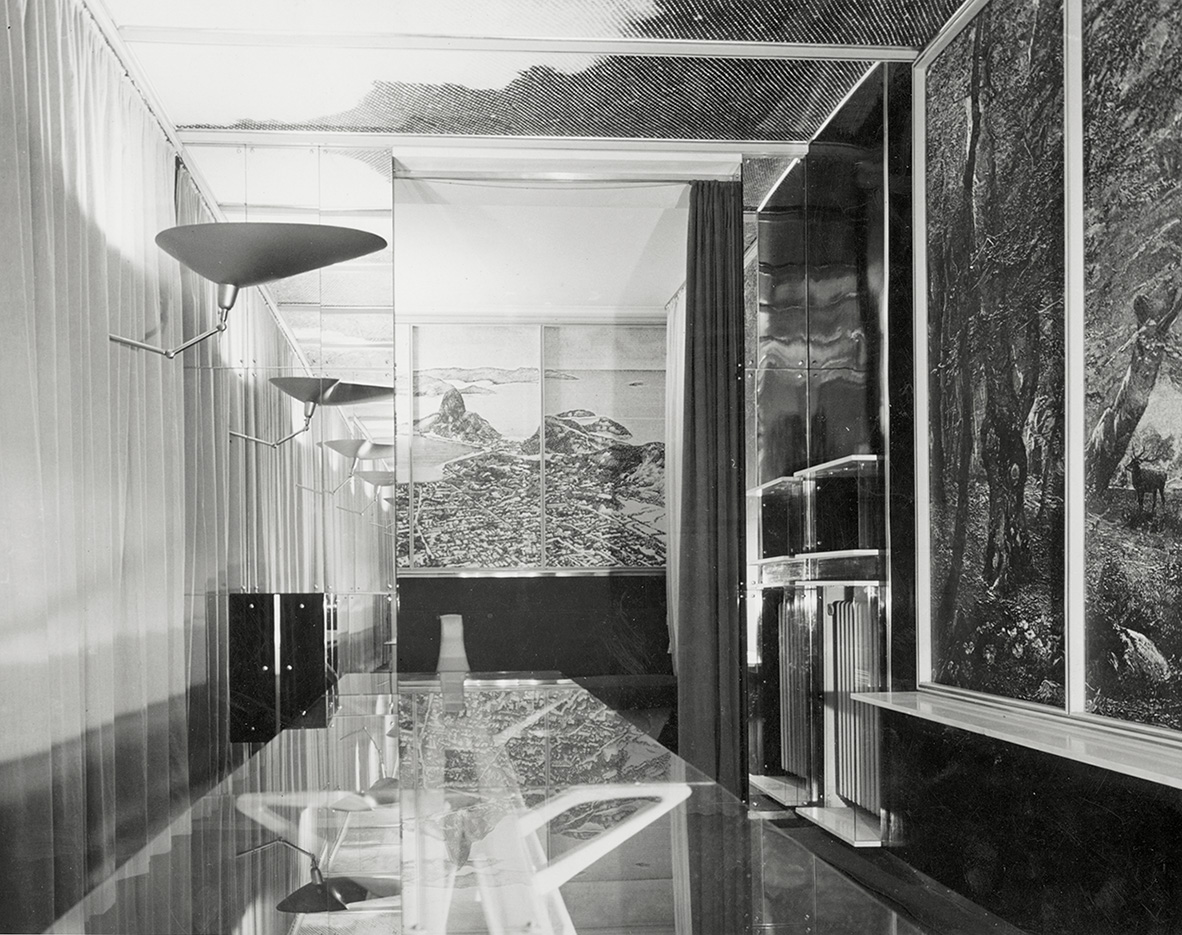
The dining room of Casa Rivetti, Turin 1949

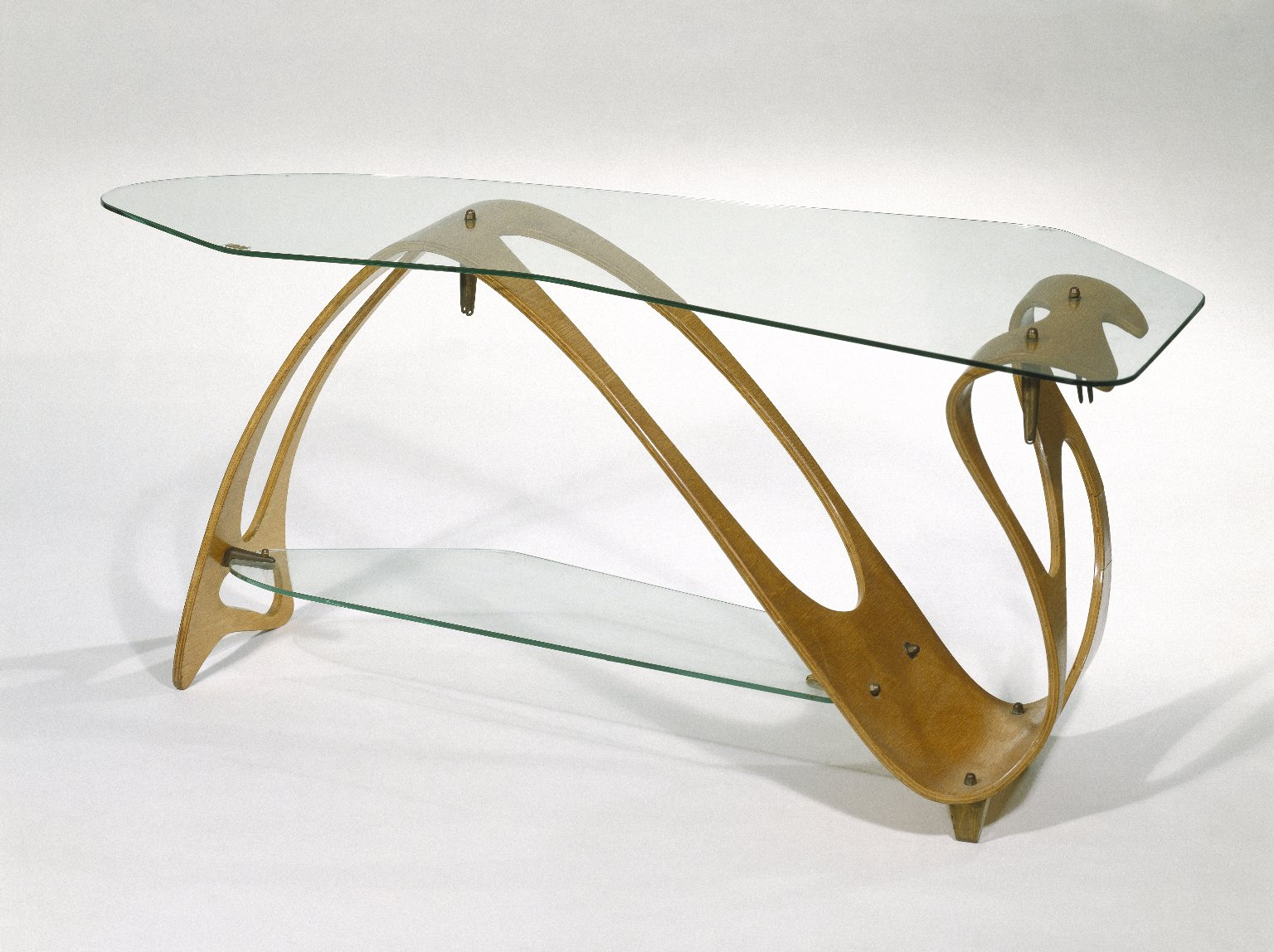
Carlo Mollino. Plywood Low Table, 1950 Brooklyn Museum

Mollino worked primarily as an interior designer. His furniture was intended as part of a larger whole, serving a specific role within the overall design. Occasionally, he made standalone pieces, typically for exhibitions. His furniture has since commanded high prices at auction.

He never designed for companies, and his pieces were never mass-produced. He was not an industrial designer, yet he engaged with the problem of industrial production, (Note: In 1943 Mollino presented a project relating to the Garzanti competition for the design of furniture to be industrially manufactured: "Proposizioni sui mobili tipo che i costruttori di mobili sono invitati a leggere," Stile, 31, July, pp. 33–37.) and his designs from 1950 to 1953 would have been well suited to mass production, though he never pursued it.

=== Design phases ===
Mollino's first interiors, designed in the 1930s, combined Surrealism with the Modern Movement.

After publishing a study on the engineer Alessandro Antonelli in 1941, Mollino entered a second phase. He began to conceive interior space as a natural setting, and the structures of plants and animals became models for his furniture.

A third phase began in 1950, when he exhibited at Italy at Work, Her Renaissance in Design Today, (Note: An exhibition on contemporary Italian art and design, both hand-crafted and industrial, traveling between 1950–53 in 12 important American museums.) which opened at the Brooklyn Museum. He began using plywood and simplified his furniture and interiors, paying attention to joints.

After 1954, Mollino largely lost interest in interior and furniture design. Few examples exist after that date, including the Sala da ballo Lutrario (transl. Lutrario Ballroom, 1959–60) and Casa Mollino (1960–68), his final interior, now a museum.

=== Apartments and interiors ===
- Casa Miller, Turin (1936)
- Casa D'Errico, Turin (1937)
- Casa Devalle I, Turin (1939)
- Casa Devalle II, Turin (1940)
- Casa A. and C. Minola, Turin (1944–46)
- Casa F. and G. Minola, Turin (1945–46)
- Casa Orengo, Turin (1949)
- Casa Rivetti, Turin (1949)
- Casa Editrice Lattes (transl. Lattes Publishing House), Turin (1951)
- Sala da ballo Lutrario (transl. Lutrario Ballroom), Turin (1959–1960)
- Casa Mollino, Turin (1960–1968)
- Casa Pistoi, Turin (1966–67)

== Unrealized projects ==
Mollino's archive contains many unbuilt and unfinished architectural projects. For Mollino, designing was as important as building.

Among his earliest projects were several alpine houses and ski refuges, including Casa Capriata (1946–1954), a wooden truss structure conceived for Sestriere. Though fully developed on paper, it was never built due to postwar financial constraints. In 1943, he entered the Garzanti furniture competition with a proposal for modular, mass-produced furniture, but wartime conditions prevented its development.

Mollino also designed a hospital in Rivoli (1954) and a plan for the ski resort of Sauze d'Oulx (1966); neither was realized. His final unfinished project was a ski complex at Sestriere, designed in 1973 and left incomplete after his death.

Additional unrealized projects include: (Note: The complete list of Mollino's unbuilt architectural projects is published in: N. Ferrari and M. Sabatino. Carlo Mollino Architect and Storyteller, Park Books, 2021.)

- Casa in Collina (transl. House on the Hill), published in Domus, 182, February 1943
- Camera da letto per una cascina in risaia (transl. Bedroom for a Farmhouse in the Rice Field), published in Domus, 181, January 1943
- Casa sull'altura (transl. House on the Heights), published in Stile, 40, April 1944
- Casa Capriata (transl. Truss House), published in Domus, 230, 1948
- Casa a Sanremo (transl. Apartment Building in Sanremo), published in Domus, 243, February 1950
- Casa Rama, published in Spazio, 2, August 1950
- Stazione d'arrivo funivia del Fürggen (transl. Fürggen Cable Car Arrival Station), published in Prospettive, 1, December 1951
- Galleria d'Arte Moderna (transl. Gallery of Modern Art of Turin), published in Prospettive, 6, July–August 1953
- Palazzo del Lavoro, Italia 61 (transl. Exhibition Hall for Italia '61), published in Casabella Continuità, 235, January 1960, and in Architectural Forum, 112, May 1960

== Photography ==
Mollino practiced photography throughout his career, producing portraits, architectural documentation, ski photography, and nudes. He treated photography as a staged medium rather than documentation. He used interiors as sets in which space, furnishings, and female figures formed a single composition. This approach linked his photographic work to his architectural practice.

=== Early photography ===
Beginning in 1934, the date of his first signed photograph, Mollino worked in black-and-white photography for over a decade. He made female portraits, and occasionally images of interiors and skis, signing his prints as artworks and exhibiting them in photography shows. (Note: For this purpose, in 1939, he joined the Associazione Fotografica Subalpina in Turin, which was part of AFI, Associazione Fotografica Italiana, the Italian Association of Photographers.) These portraits recall Man Ray and Erwin Blumenfeld, but incorporate literary references and architectural settings of his own design. Separately, he photographed his interiors and buildings for publication in architectural magazines; through retouching and photomontage, these images became a means of realizing his architectural vision.

In December 1943, Mollino finished the typescript for Il Messaggio dalla Camera Oscura (transl. Message from the Darkroom), a volume on the history and criticism of photography. Published in 1949, the book argues for photography's capacity to transfigure reality beneath its objective appearance. (Note: Carlo Mollino, Il Messaggio dalla Camera Oscura, Chiantore, Turin 1949. The book is 444 pages in a 24×34 cm format, with 323 B&W photos and 12 color plates. A reprint was published by AdArte, Turin, in 2006 together with an English translation: Message from the Darkroom, AdArte, Turin 2006.)

From the late 1930s, he also photographed skiers, especially Leo Gasperl, trainer of the Italian national alpine ski team. Some of these images were signed as artworks; others appeared in magazines or in his skiing manual, Introduzione al Discesismo (transl. Introduction to Downhill Skiing).

=== Nude photography ===
In 1956, after pausing for several years, Mollino began making nude photographs, staged within interiors and furnishings he had designed. He produced numerous Polaroid photographs of women, rediscovered after his death.

He rented the annex of Villa Scalero on the Turin hillside and acquired women's clothing and accessories for the shoots. Using a Leica, he made nudes that referenced art history while drawing on fashion magazines and popular culture. He retouched the prints extensively, redrawing silhouettes and shading.

In 1962, he left Villa Scalero and purchased a small villa on the Turin hillside, which he named Villa Zaira. He redesigned the interior as a studio and began using a Polaroid camera, continuing to acquire 1960s clothing and lingerie. The hundreds of nude photographs he took between 1956 and 1973 were not exhibited until the 1980s. (Note: The Polaroids were published for the first time in: Carlo Mollino Polaroid, Allemandi, Turin 1985, and its French edition Carlo Mollino Polaroïds, Le Promeneur, Paris 1986.)

== Personal life ==
Mollino never married. From 1948 to 1955, he had a relationship with the sculptor Carmelina Piccolis.

He died on 27 August 1973 while working in his studio.

== Legacy ==
Mollino's work has influenced later architects and artists. The Mexican architect Javier Senosiain, known for organic forms such as "The Organic House," has cited Mollino's integration of natural structures into architecture. The artist India Evans has drawn on Mollino's photographs of women, and the architect Garcia Tamjidi has cited Mollino's photographs of cars and furniture as inspiration.
