= Goûter Route =

Mountain route to reach Mont Blanc summit

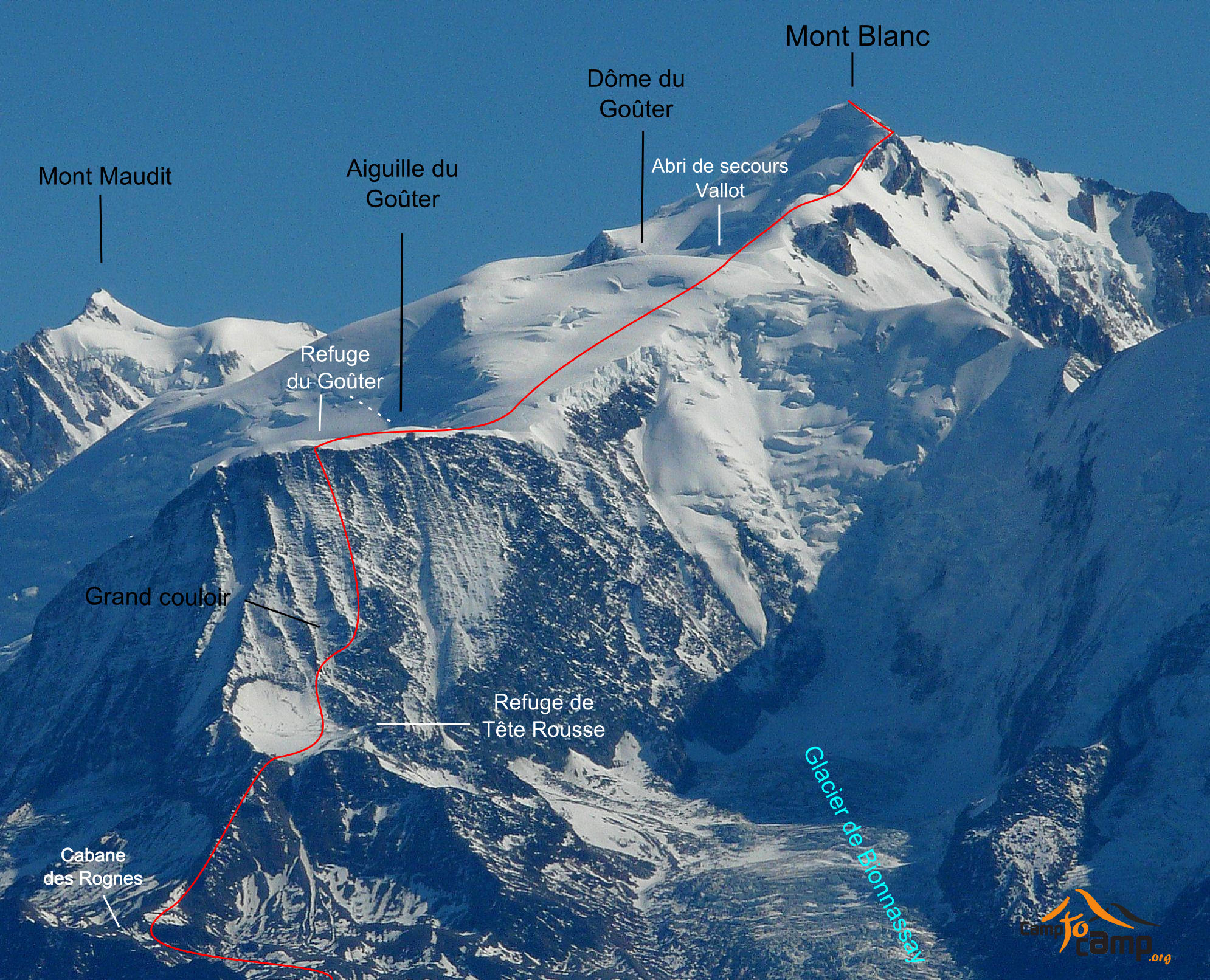
Mont Blanc - Goûter Route

The Goûter Route (also known as the Voie Des Cristalliers and Voie Royale) is one of the two normal mountaineering routes used to reach the summit of Mont Blanc in the Alps, ascending to a height of 4,808 metres (15,774 ft). The route lies on the north side of the mountain, in France. Usually reckoned as the easiest route up Mont Blanc, it is extremely popular with mountaineers, seeing thousands of ascents per year.

== History ==
The first attempt of this route (from the Aiguille du Goûter up to the Col du Dôme, but not further), was completed on 17 September 1784 by Jean Marie Couttet and François Cuidet. This was two years prior to the first successful attempt to reach Mont Blanc's summit in 1786. However, the first complete ascent of the mountain the via the Aiguille du Goûter, the Dôme du Goûter and L'Arête des Bosses (Bosses Ridge) was only accomplished on 18 July 1861, more than seventy years later. The first ascensionists were Leslie Stephen and Francis Fox Tuckett with the guides Melchior Anderegg, Johann-Josef Bennen and Peter Perren.

=== Increasing popularity and introduction of permit system ===
Numerous accidents from 2003 onwards have brought to public attention the perceived overuse of the route. Local residents raised concerns about the fragile alpine environment and the "progressive banalisation" and "globalisation" of the mountain to a mere tourist destination. Since 25 May 2019, on the Goûter Route, a regulation is in force with quota-limited climbing permits required for all climbers. The quotas are based on the dates which climbers choose to stay at each of the refuges along the route.

== Description ==
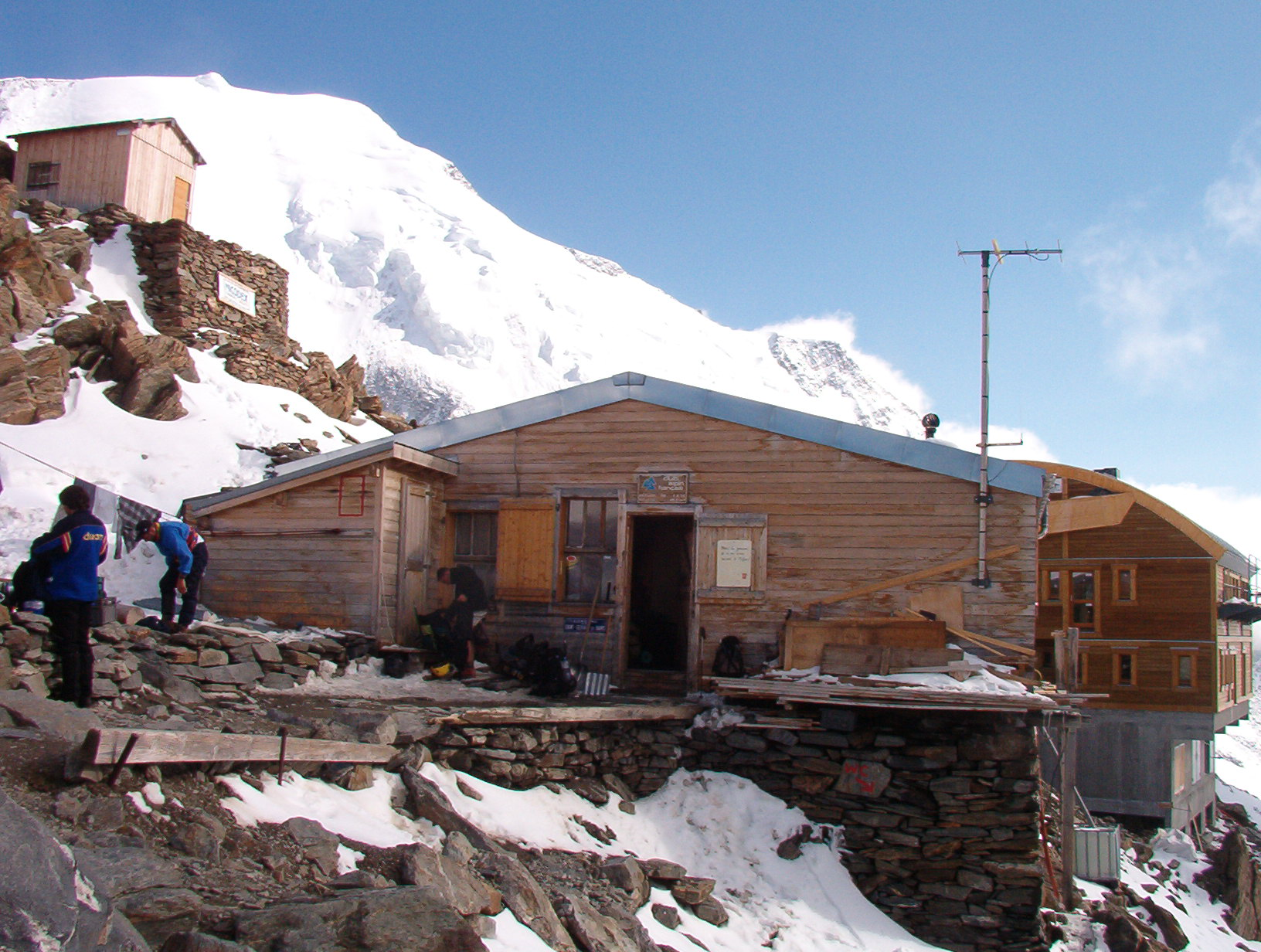
Old Tête Rousse Hut, now dismantled, with the new behind

The ascent usually takes 2 days. From Saint-Gervais-les-Bains, climbers must first reach the Nid d'Aigle, either via the Mont Blanc Tramway or by foot. From here, climbers hike to and then ascend a lateral moraine to the Tête Rousse Hut and the Tête Rousse Glacier. After crossing the Tête Rousse glacier, climbers access a short stretch of rock and immediately afterwards reach the infamous Couloir du Goûter or Grand Couloir. The 100 m-long section is protected by a steel cable, intended to be used in avalanche emergencies only.

The unstable rocks in the couloir have become infamous as more and more climbers attempt Mont Blanc up this route. In the period between 1990 and 2011, 74 people have died and 180 injured in accidents along this section. This is attributed primarily to the fragmented rocks in the area, the rising popularity of the route, and lack of technical and athletic skills. The increasingly infamous reputation of this short section and the scramble above it have also created a positive feedback loop, where climbers attempt to get through the area as rapidly as possible, in turn exacerbating existing risks. Most accidents occur when climbers slip off of unstable terrain or are hit by rockfall from above. While still risky, the vast majority of climbers make it through the section with no trouble.

Beyond the couloir, one scrambles up a crest of rock leads up to the top of the mountain face, soon reaching the former Goûter Hut (an old mountain hut) where the path increases in steepness. This section is equipped with protective steel cables, above which climbers reach the ridge of the Aiguille du Goûter at the altitude of 3817 m. From here, climbers go 200 metres to the south to find the new Goûter Hut, which opened in 2013.

Beyond this, the climb continues on straightforward, if sometimes exposed, terrain. While the most technically difficult part of the climb has concluded, climbers should be aware of increasingly hazardous weather, a highly strenuous ascent ahead of 1000 m, and the risks they face on descent.

The ascent to the summit from the Goûter Hut consists of a continuous progression on snow across the following landmarks:

- Aiguille du Goûter (3,863 m)
- Dôme du Goûter (4,304 m)
- Vallot Hut (emergency cabin, 4,362 m)
- Grande Bosse (4,513 m)
- Petite Bosse (4,547 m)
- Rocher de la Tournette (4,677 m)
- Summit of Mont Blanc (4,808 m)

The final approach typically involves walking (with crampons) on the top of an arête, ending at a flat spot that is the summit area.

== Grade ==
The route is simple and requires few technical abilities, but is not to be underestimated because of exposure to objective dangers. It is also physically demanding, and may be totally exhausting to those with limited athletic ability. Additionally, there are the risks of hypothermia and frostbite. Above the Aiguille du Goûter, altitude sickness occurs frequently with climbers regardless of skill and the only remedy is descending to the valley if possible.

In the International French adjectival alpine system (IFAS), which evaluates the overall difficulty, this route is generally classified as a "PD" (peu difficile) or "PD-/PD+".
