= Grand Couloir (Mont Blanc) =

Couloir on the Aiguille du Goûter

The Grand Couloir is a couloir on the Aiguille du Goûter. At 3,340 metres (10,960 ft) altitude, this gully has to be traversed on foot to reach the scramble beyond the Tête Rousse Hut (3,167 metres (10,390 ft)) up to the Goûter Refuge (3,835 metres (12,582 ft)) on the Goûter Route on Mont Blanc. The daily number of climbers allowed has been limited since 2019.

== Accidents ==
This gully is a well-known accident spot in dry conditions when little or no snow binds the loose surface rocks together. The couloir can channel falling stones to present a serious hazard to climbers crossing between the relatively safe sides. It is a site of many fatal accidents and narrow escapes on the popular Goûter Route. For this reason the press sometimes refers to the passage as the "couloir de la mort", "corridor of death" or "gully of death" when reporting on the frequent accidents at or around this spot during the summer climbing season or compare passing through it to Russian roulette.

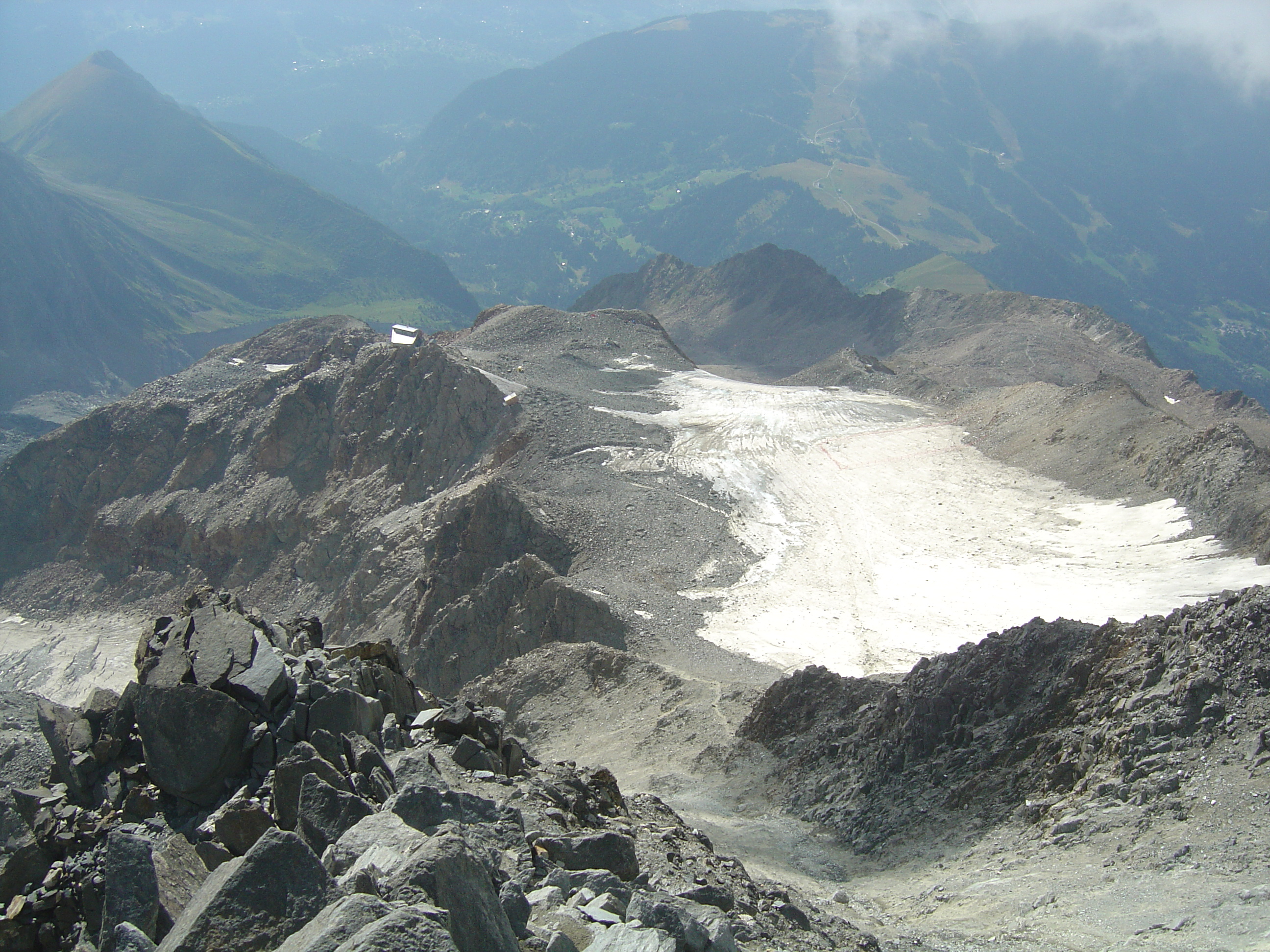
Looking down the Grand Couloir from the Aiguille de Goûter towards the Tête Rousse glacier

A study describing the situation as "The Gouter Problem" mentions that 75% of the rockfalls at the spot occur between 10 am and 4 pm, with on average one event of rock fall every 17 minutes between 11 am and 12 pm.

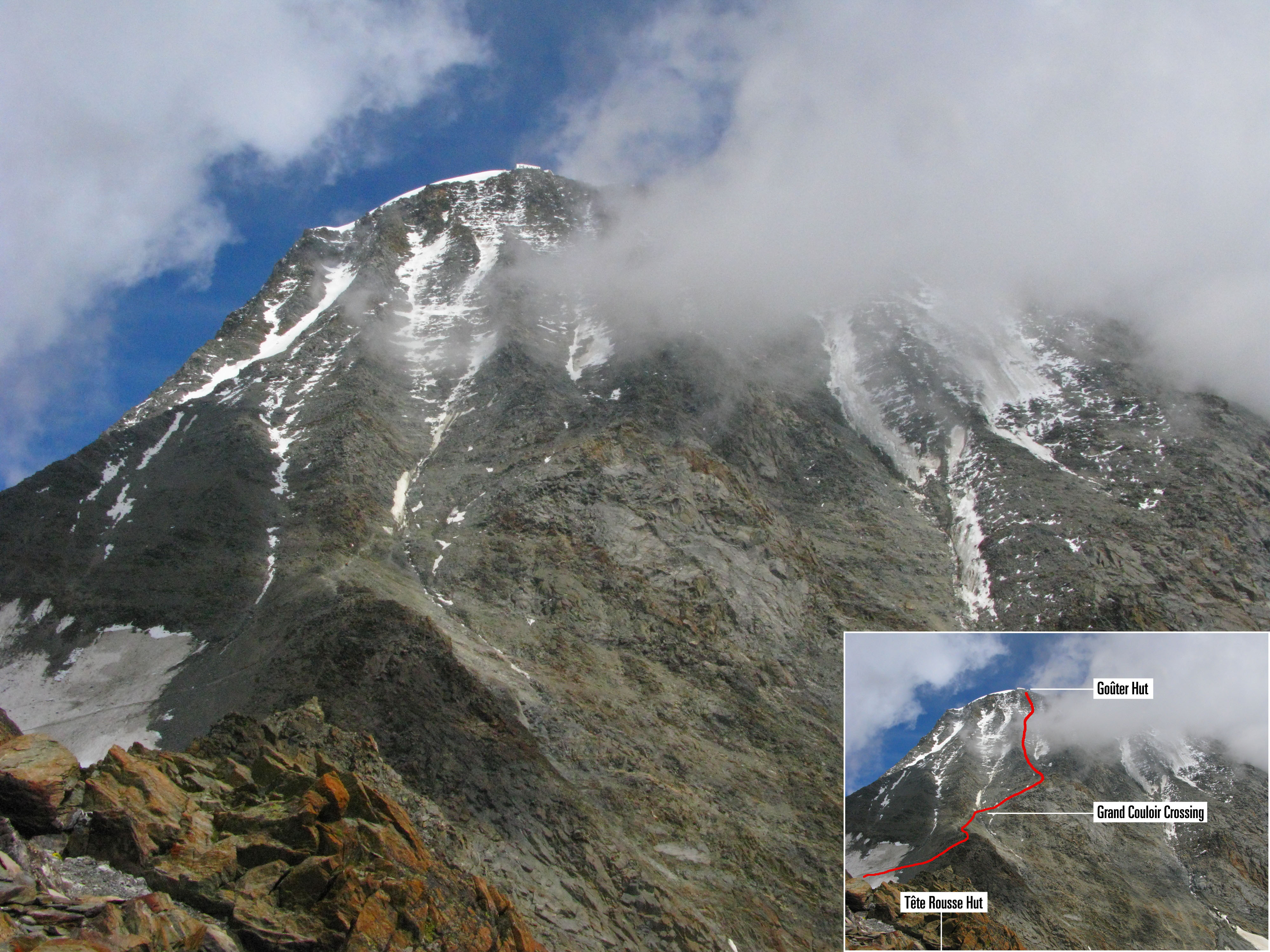
The route up to the Aiguille du Goûter beyond the Grand Couloir

From 1990 to 2011, French mountain police force registers show 291 rescue operations in the Goûter couloir. 74 of those rescued died and 180 were injured. By 2017 that total rose to 347 rescue operations, 102 deaths and 230 injuries.

During the extremely hot summer of 2015, the Goûter Hut was temporarily closed on prefectural order to dissuade climbers from taking this route.

In August 2026, the Gouter and Tete Rousse refuges were shut from the 11th to 26th, due to stonefall danger in the Grand Couloir.

== Accident prevention ==
In 2020 the Petzl Foundation published the results of a study of a potential alternative route. The study found that the alternate would be more dangerous than the current path through the couloir. Several geotechnical experts studied the local geomorphological conditions and concluded that melting permafrost significantly increases the danger of crossing the couloir. A complete removal of the metal cables was considered after the 2017 season, but it was noted that deaths occurred in places without cables.
