= Goûter Hut =

Mountain refuge in the French department of Haute-Savoie

Coordinates: 45.85122°N 6.83073°E

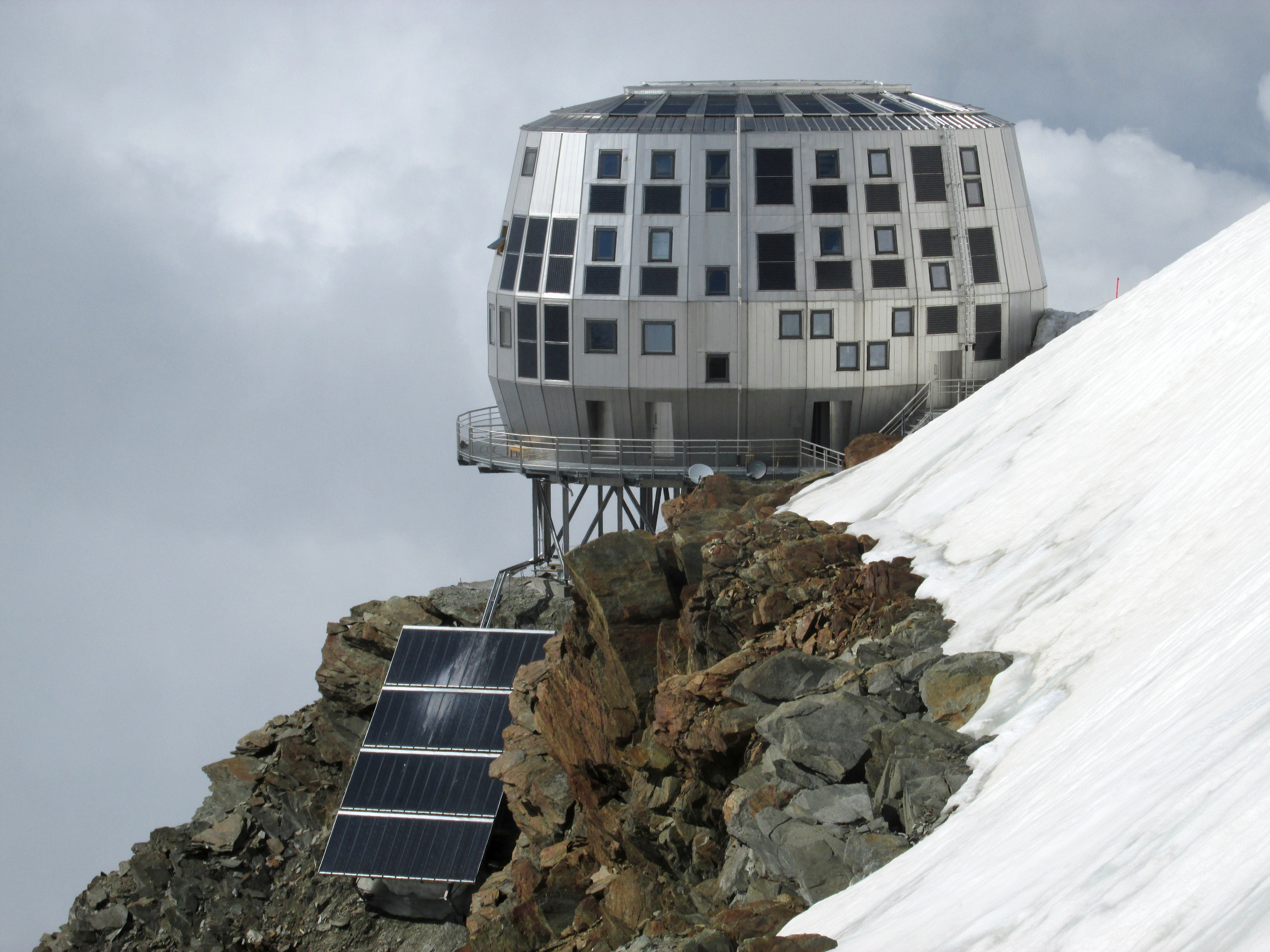
- view of the new Gouter Hut, built in 2013
- Interactive map of the Goûter Hut area

General information
- Owner: Club Alpin Francais

Website
- refugedugouter.ffcam.fr

The Goûter Hut (French: Refuge du Goûter), is a mountain refuge in the French department of Haute-Savoie. It is located at a height of 3,835 metres (12,582 ft) on the Arete du Goûter in the municipality of Saint-Gervais-les-Bains. It overlooks the Glacier de Bionnassay, and is the highest wardened mountain hut in France.

It is an important staging post for many mountaineers on the most popular means of climbing to the summit of Mont Blanc, known as the Goûter Route. It is the least difficult technically and therefore the one that concentrates at least an estimated 75% of the climbs. Each year, thousands of climbers attempt to summit on this route, sleeping overnight at the refuge and departing in the early morning for the final push. The building in its present state can accommodate up to 120 visitors.

The hut has been rebuilt and expanded a number of times over the last 150 years as its popularity as a mountaineering base has increased. There have been numerous deaths and injuries sustained by climbers on its access route.

== Location ==
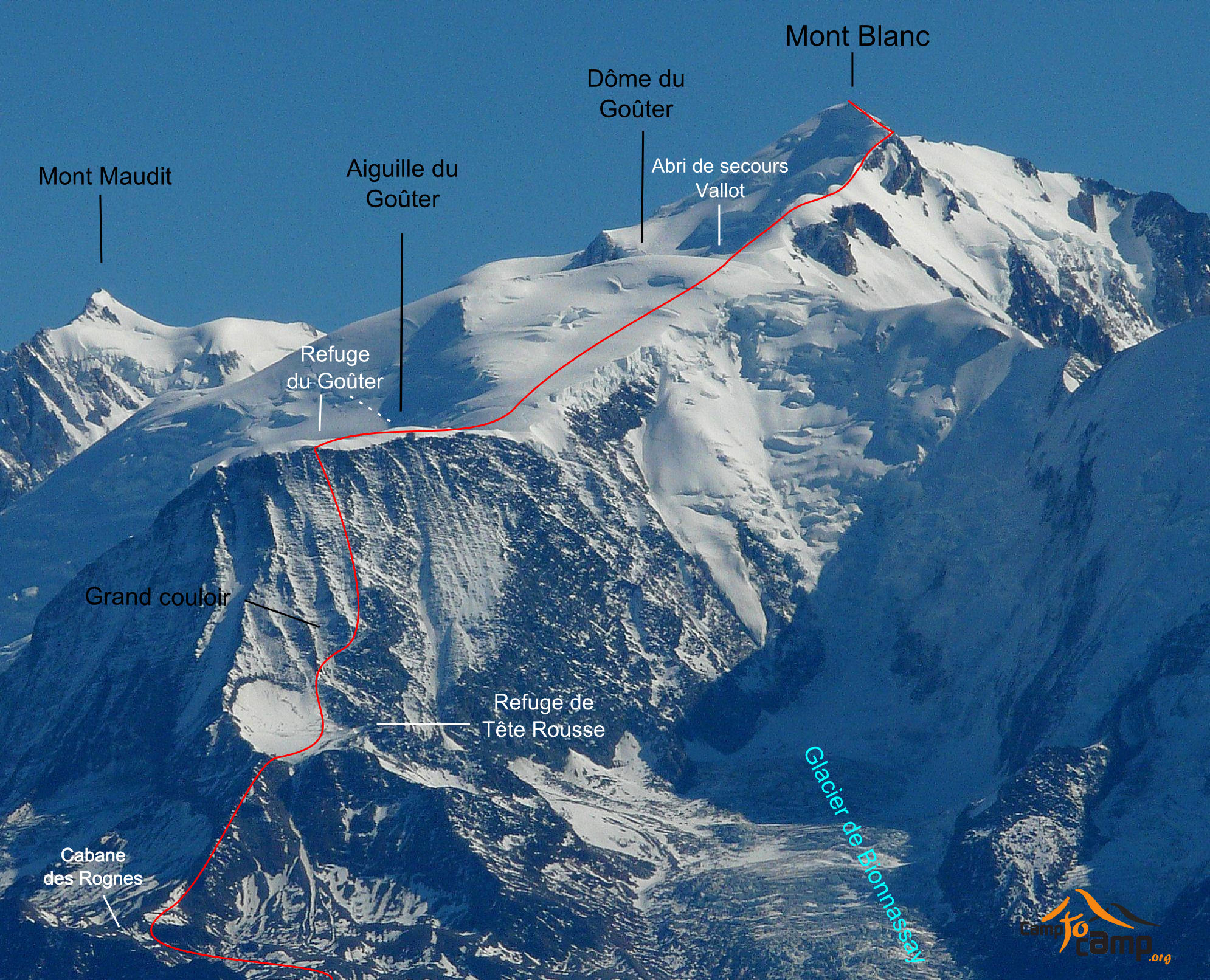
Map of the Goûter route, showing the location of the Goûter Refuge.

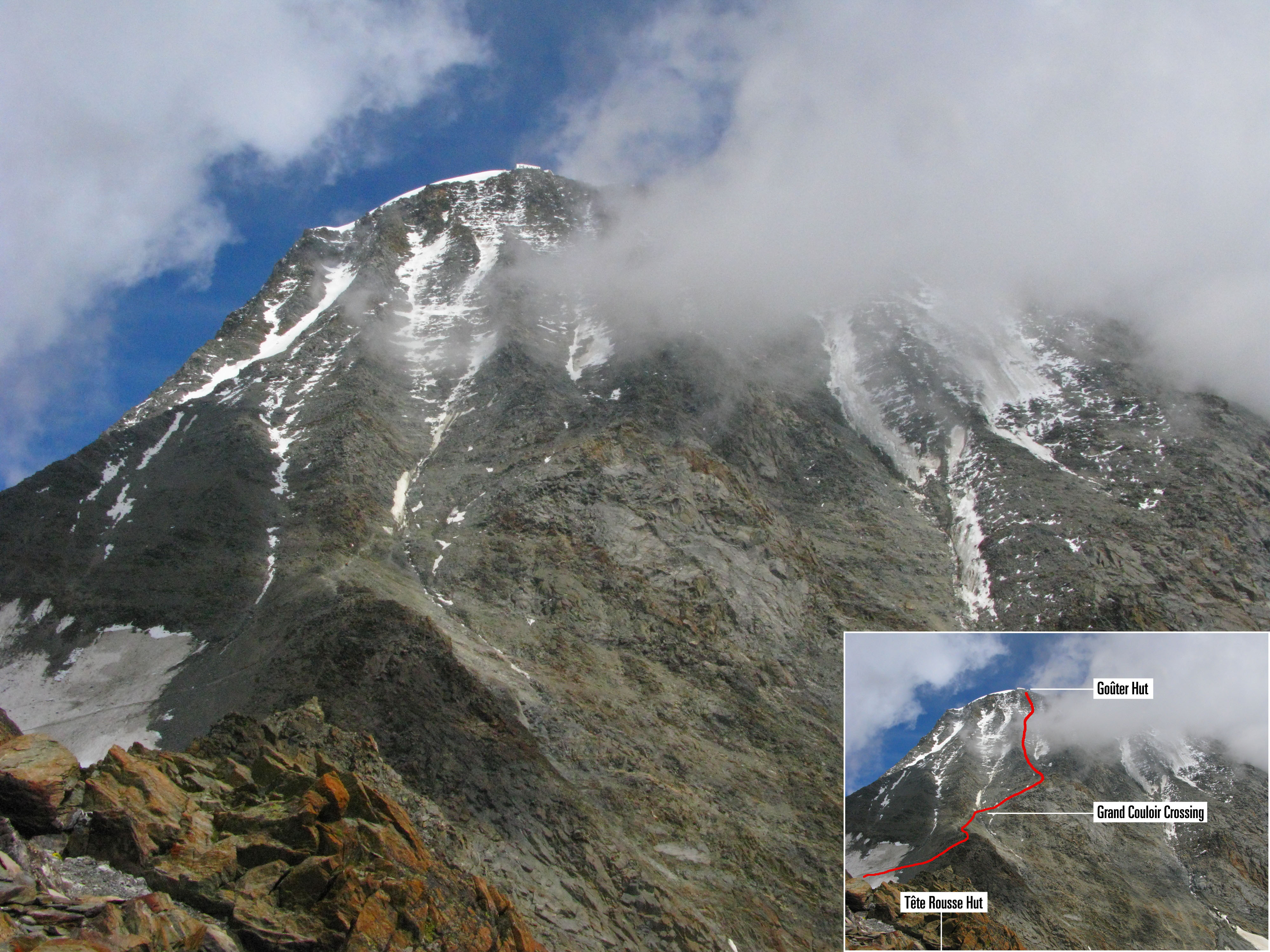
Approach to the hut beyond the Grand Couloir

The refuge, with its own helicopter landing platform for logistics and mountain rescue operations, is located in the south-east of France, in the Auvergne-Rhône-Alpes region and the department of Haute-Savoie. It is located on the territory of the municipality of Saint-Gervais-les-Bains and dominates the Bionnassay glacier, on the eastern slope of Val Montjoie in the Mont Blanc massif. It stands at an altitude of 3,835 meters (12,582 ft) on the snowy ridge of the Aiguille du Goûter (3,863 m (12,674 ft)), which separates the Val Montjoie from the main basin of the Arve Valley, with the towns of Les Houches and the alpinism and ski resort of Chamonix-Mont-Blanc. Annecy is 60 kilometres (37 mi) to the west and Lyon nearly 180 kilometres (110 mi). The border with Italy runs about 1.7 kilometres (1.1 mi) to the south, around the Dôme du Goûter (4,304 m (14,121 ft)), while the summit of Mont Blanc is less than 4 kilometres (2.5 mi) to the south-east.

The foundations of the refuge rest on a base of gneiss, present between three and four meters deep. Around the refuge, the winds can blow at 300 kilometres per hour (190 mph) and the temperature rarely exceeds 0 °C (32 °F).

It is accessible in about five hours on foot from the station of the Nid d'Aigle in Saint-Gervais-les-Bains and from there allows mountaineers the second part of the ascent of Mont Blanc, depending on the conditions in five to seven additional hours by what in the 20th century became known as the modern normal route on the French side, or as the French call it the "voie royale" or "royal way", distinguishing from the former old normal route via the Grands Mulets Hut.

== History ==
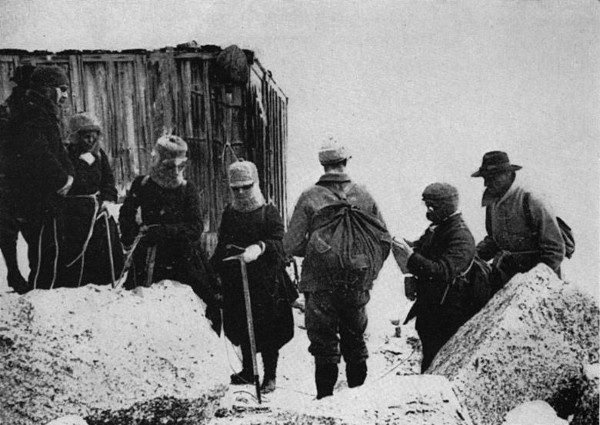
View on the first Goûter Hut built in 1858-1859 and restored in 1882 (photograph around 1900).

The presence of a shelter at this location dates back to 1854, but the first refuge itself was built four or five years later. It was rebuilt in 1936 and expanded in 1960. At the same time, a second building was built next door in 1906 and rebuilt in 1990 as an annex. Finally, a new shelter with 120 places in its dormitories, at 200 m (660 ft) distance from the old hut, is conceived from 2010 and opens in June 2013. It benefits from many architectural and environmental innovations. Its somewhat futuristic shape is ovoid (three-dimensional oval), is distinguished by its stainless steel coating, and has four levels. A reservation is required to stay at night.

Since 1864 local guides, from the Compagnie des guides de Saint-Gervais-Les Contamines lead clients to the summit of Mont Blanc via this itinerary, that also came known as the Goûter route. Since 1912 it is possible for climbers to make a substantial part of the approach march by rail, when the Tramway du Mont Blanc was extended to its present terminus Nid d'Aigle.

=== Origins ===
After the Genevan scientist Horace-Bénédict de Saussure in 1760 offered a reward to the first man to reach the summit of Mont Blanc, inhabitants from the Arve Valley (then part of the independent Duchy of Savoy) started exploring the possibilities. Already before the actual first successful ascent by Jacques Balmat and Michel-Gabriel Paccard via the Glacier des Bossons in 1786, also an approach over the Aiguille du Goûter was considered for a possible gateway to the summit. As early as 1784, two years before the first ascent of Mont Blanc, the hunters Jean-Marie Couttet and François Guidet suggested this location to build some kind of cabin to facilitate climbers, but it was not until 1854 that Dr. Charles Loiseau had a crude stone shed (abri) built for him to spend the night on 30 July 1854, prior to an ascent attempt. He was unsuccessful in this, having been thwarted by bad weather.

=== 1858 / 1906 huts ===
The first proper mountain refuge on the Aiguille du Goûter was built in 1858, capable of accommodating three or four people. This small hut was renovated in 1882, and was subsequently replaced by a completely new shelter in 1906. This hut opened on 4 September of that year and was capable of accommodating 10 people. It was managed by the St. Gervais Section of the French Alpine Club.

The increasing use of the hut led to the construction, next to it, on the plans of architect Jaillet, of a new refuge. Amoudruz from Chamonix completed the project in September 1906. This new building remained very small, with 4.20 by 3.20 m (13.8 by 10.5 ft) on the ground and a height of 1.80 m (5 ft 11 in), and could only accommodate seven people but, better built, it was less uncomfortable.

=== 1936 Orset hut ===
In 1936, at the site of the 1858 hut, Georges Orset built a private shelter with a capacity of thirty places. This was bought in 1942 by the French Alpine Club (CAF) which refurbishes and improves it. However it turns out to be too small for the yearly increasing number of aspiring alpinists. at a height of 3,817 metres (12,523 ft) on the Aiguille du Goûter, close to the previous 1906 structure. It could now offer 30 beds to climbers, and in 1942 was purchased by the French Alpine Club (FFCAM). Up to this point, all materials to construct these high altitude mountain huts had been manually portered in. However, with the advent of the helicopter, the next stage of the Goûter Hut's development would be assisted by air power.

=== 1962 Goûter hut ===
As part of a five-year plan launched in 1957 for the reconstruction of the French refuges of the Mont-Blanc massif, it was decided to enlarge the refuge of 1936. This work was financed by the local municipalities, the department of Haute-Savoie, the French government and the CAF. This shelter was designed by architect Lederlin and prefabricated. In 1960, work started to enlarge the Goûter Hut, increasing its capacity to 76 people. It would be a prefabricated structure, lined with wood. Construction work lasted three seasons, and the new refuge was finally opened in September 1962 by Maurice Herzog, High Commissioner for Youth and Sports.

=== 1991 Goûter hut annex ===
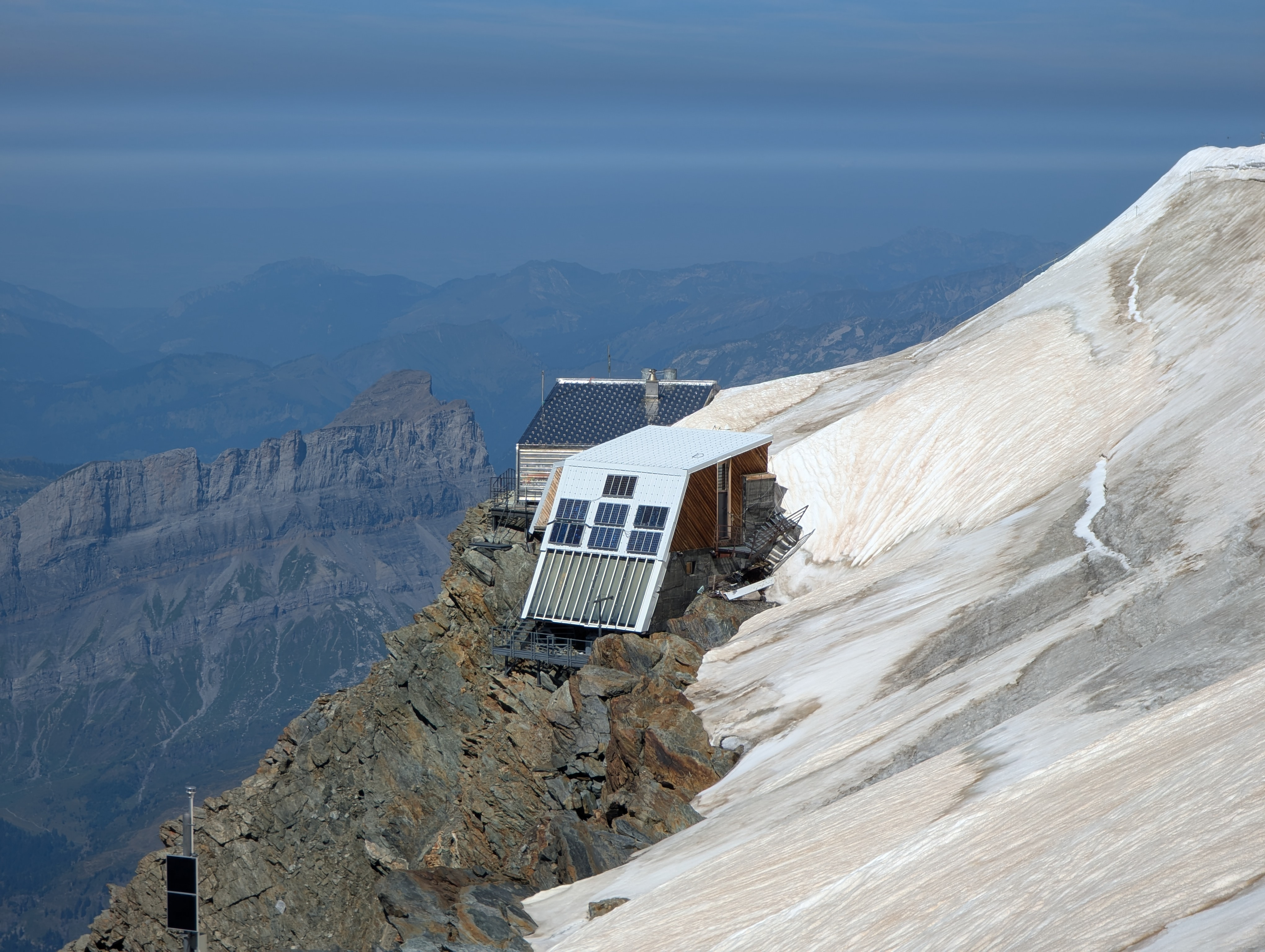
Old Gouter huts, viewed from near the current refuge.

From 1962 to 1990, the Goûter Hut could still only officially accommodate 76 climbers. It had a warden and hotel service in summer, and was locked in winter.

In 1989, the refuge of 1906 was dismantled and work had begun to construct an extension or annex on the site of the old 1906 hut, bringing the total capacity up to 120 climbers. In its place, in 1990, an annex of forty places was built to increase the capacity. However, because of the overcrowding of the shelter and the attractiveness of Mont Blanc, safety and hygiene standards became once again outdated very soon. The annex opened in 1991.

For many years the Goûter Hut's increasing popularity as the easiest staging post for an ascent of Mont Blanc led to it gaining "widespread notoriety" for being overcrowded, oppressive, outdated, extremely cold at night, unhygienic and only having two external toilets. Like many alpine refuges, human waste voided directly down the mountainside. It was also booked up many days in advance, and one source even stated that "sleep is best accomplished in an upright position". Another source described it as "...a pock-marked metal shed sitting on shifting ice."

=== Plans for new refuge ===
By 2004 it was realised that further renovation of the old 1960s building and its 1990s annex was unfeasible, so the decision was made to construct an entirely new refuge a little higher up along the Aiguille du Goûter, and for it to be as eco-friendly as possible.

Thus, in 2004, the French Federation of Alpine and Mountain Clubs (FFCAM, formerly CAF) proposed a new type of structure. Two years later, the architects Christophe de Laage, Paul Parizet and Michelle Avanzini sketched a first series of plans; implementation remained, however, at a standstill for budgetary and technical reasons. New designers led by the Swiss Thomas Büchi, for the frame, and Hervé Dessimoz, for architecture and engineering (both also known for their design of The Globe of Science and Innovation), reinforced the project of the Swiss firm Groupe H in collaboration with the French firm Deca-Laage to find solutions that would meet the constraints of the site. The construction of the new refuge began on 5 July 2010. The opening took place on 28 June 2013, with a capacity of 120 places voluntarily reduced, instead of the 140 initially planned, to control the frequency of the normal way of Mont Blanc and for financial reasons. It was inaugurated on 6 September 2014 by the Minister of Ecology, Sustainable Development and Energy Ségolène Royal. The annex of the former hut, originally intended to be demolished or to become a scientific observatory. was finally preserved, with a capacity reduced to twenty places; it is converted into a winter and emergency fire shelter.

== Characteristics of the 2013 hut ==
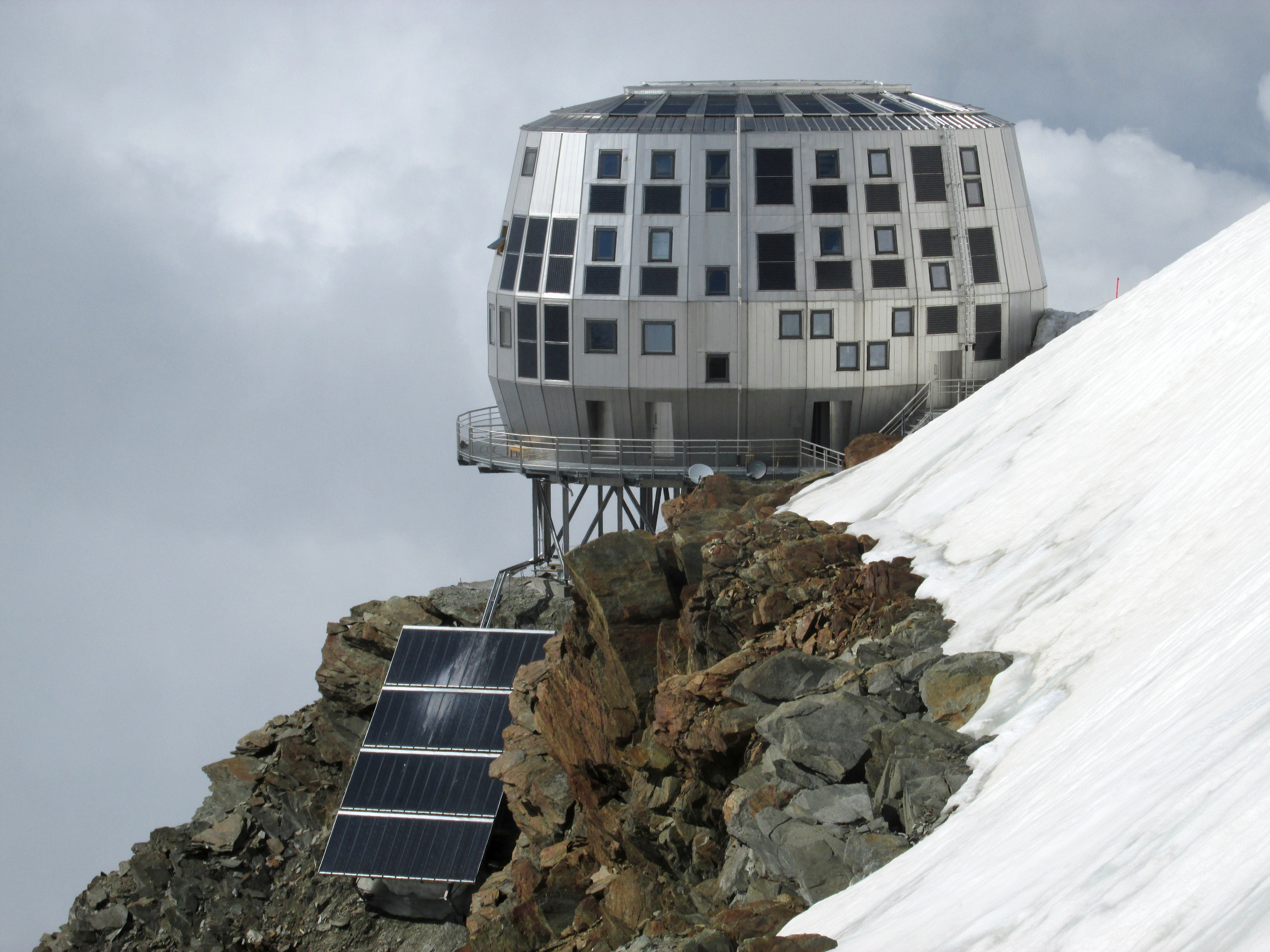
The new Goûter Hut with its futuristic design, as opened in 2013.

The new Goûter refuge is built on four levels, with a floor area of 720 m^{2} (7,800 sq ft) and a capacity of 120 places. To fight against overcrowding the préfet (State representative in a French Department) and the Mayor of the municipality Saint-Gervais-les-Bains initially set the maximum capacity of the new shelter at 140. For financial reasons, the FFCAM (Fédération française des clubs alpins et de montagne), who built this new hut as part of an administrative lease, decided to reduce the number to 120.

The building boasts advanced technology in terms of architecture and energy autonomy, making it a project of high environmental standards and intent to be "a marvel of self-sustainability". Its construction cost 7.5 million euros, funded 51% by the French Federation of Alpine and Mountain Clubs (FFCAM) and 49% by public authorities and patrons. Its form is ovoid, optimal against the wind and the thrust exerted by the snow, with a height of thirteen meters.

The building has a stainless steel exterior with 55 sealed windows in triple glazed argon and krypton gas blades for thermal insulation. In order to free up sufficient space at the rear of the building to place a snow melter with eight 3,000-liter (660 imp gal; 790 U.S. gal) tanks, one-third of its foundations are suspended overhanging above 700 meters (2,300 ft) of void and anchored by 69 metal piles.

It is supplemented by 50 m^{2} (540 sq ft) of solar thermal collectors located in the slope below the shelter, whose energy can be stored in the form of hot brine in a 2,000-liter (440 imp gal; 530 U.S. gal) buffer tank for the production of domestic hot water. Wastewater is filtered and sterilized. Electricity is produced by 95 m^{2} (1,020 sq ft) of photovoltaic solar collectors placed on the roof and on the façade.

In 2026, the old refuge was removed.

== Climbing routes to and from the hut ==
The Goûter hut can in summer time be reached in about five hours by a hike and a scramble from the station of the Nid d'Aigle, terminus of the Tramway du Mont Blanc (TMB) at 2,372 m (7,782 ft) altitude. From there a path trodden by the multitude of aspiring climbers leads to the edge of the Tête Rousse Glacier with its namesake refuge (3,167 m (10,390 ft)). From there the dangerous Grand Couloir has to be crossed, where the scramble on the ridge alongside the couloir begins.

The refuge is mainly used by alpinist parties to climb Mont Blanc by its modern normal route on the French side. In good weather conditions it takes about five hours between the refuge and the summit, via the Dôme du Goûter and the Bosses Ridge, then another five hours to descend all the way back again to the Nid d'Aigle station.

Booking the refuge (online) and confirming 3 days before arrival is mandatory for all climbers.

== Season ==
The wardened main part of the hut is only opened in the summer season, normally from the last week of May to the end of September or the beginning of October. In 2017 from 20 May and in 2018 from 25 May, as declared by the Fédération Française des Clubs Alpins et de Montagne (FFCAM). Because of the meteorological conditions (higher temperatures), in 2015 the hut remained open until 15 October after the season in which it was closed twice "administratively", i.e. ordered by the authorities.

As of 2019 the hut guardian is Mr. Antoine Rattin.

During the season of 2018 the hut registered a record number of 11,258 booked overnightings.

== Safety ==
The website of the hut contains this warning text: Please note that going to the refuge is a real alpinism course. You must have the skills and technical equipment. To beware the rocks falling in the couloir du Goûter, it is recommended to reach it very early.

In 2014, the municipality of Saint Gervais-les-Bains placed a sign alongside the approach route, with a warning text in French, German and English advising climbers to cancel or postpone their ascent of Mont Blanc. In 2015 a new warning was repeated in French and English with capital letters: "Couloir du Goûter" is very dangerous. Be careful. Falling rocks.

== Webcams and local weather forecast ==
Three webcams have been installed on the refuge, to allow climbers to observe in real time the weather conditions at high altitude, before climbing the Mont Blanc: one with view to the South and the Col de Bionnassay, the other towards the exit of the Couloir de Goûter and Tête Rousse, to the North, and the last one towards the Aiguille de Bionnassay, towards the West.

The website Mountain Forecast provides specific climber directed weather reports for several summits in the vicinity of the hut: Aiguille de Bionnassay, Dôme du Goûter and Mont-Blanc.

== Gallery ==
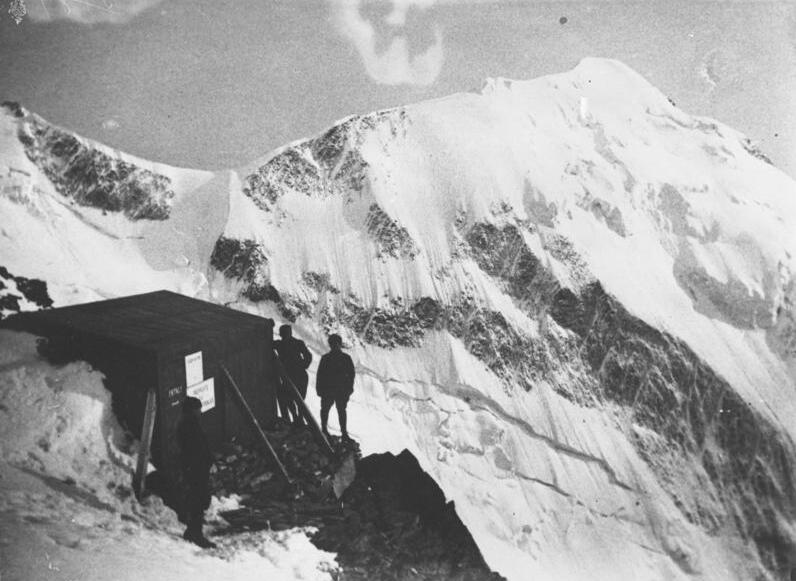
The old Goûter Hut from 1906 with room for 7, in 1925

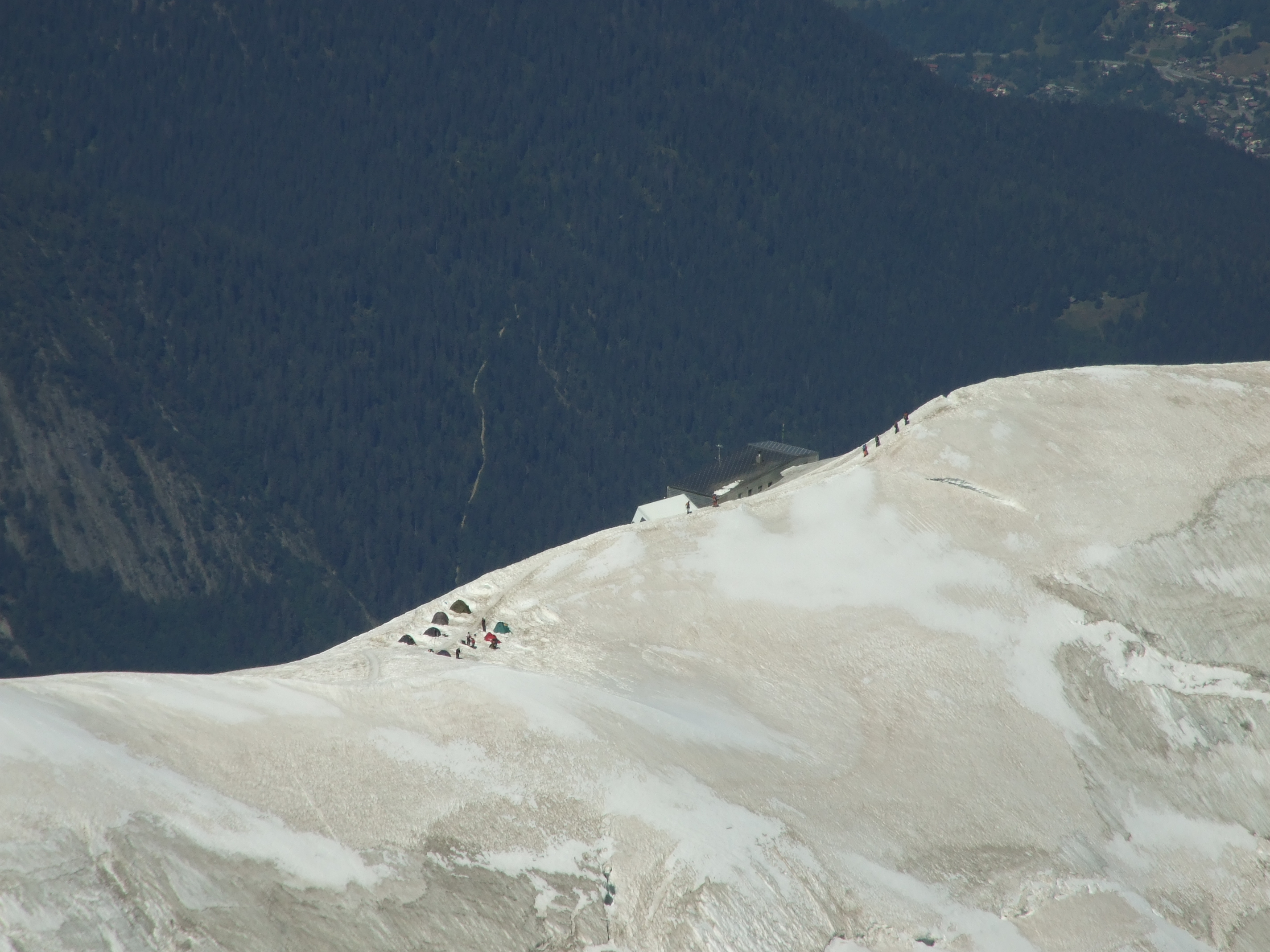
The Goûter Hut in 2009, when camping was still allowed

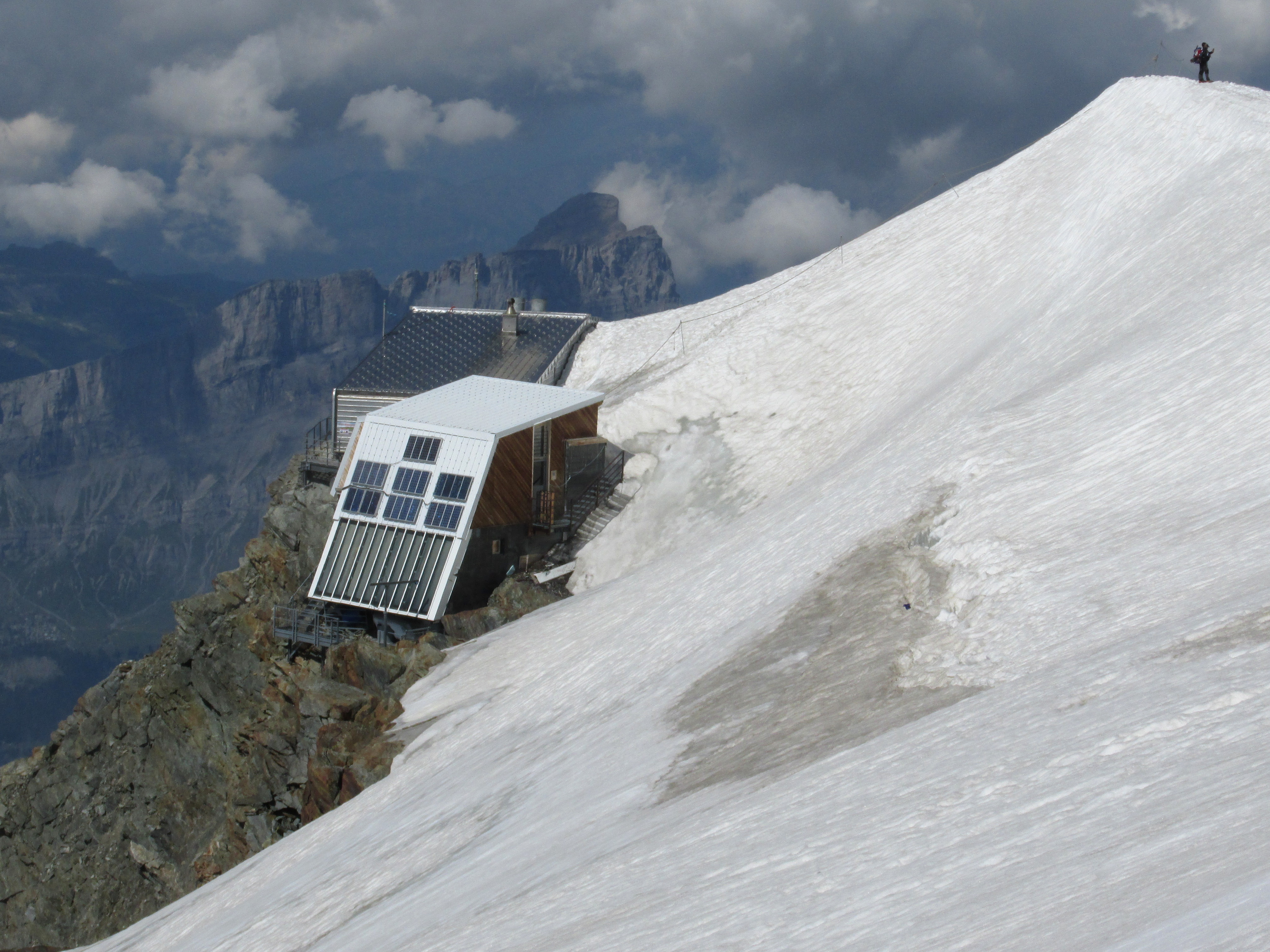
The old Goûter Hut, in front the winter room

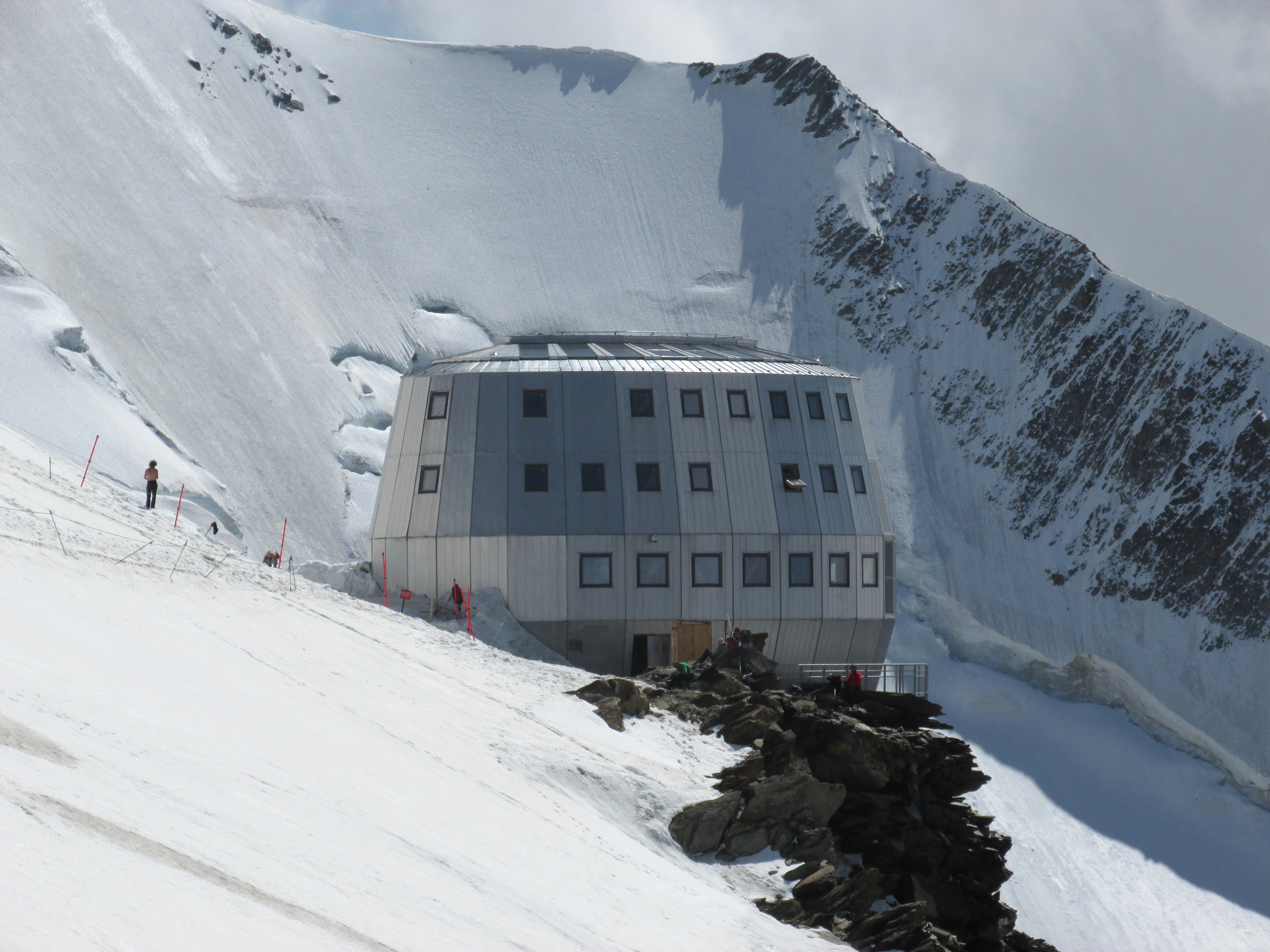
View on the new Goûter Hut

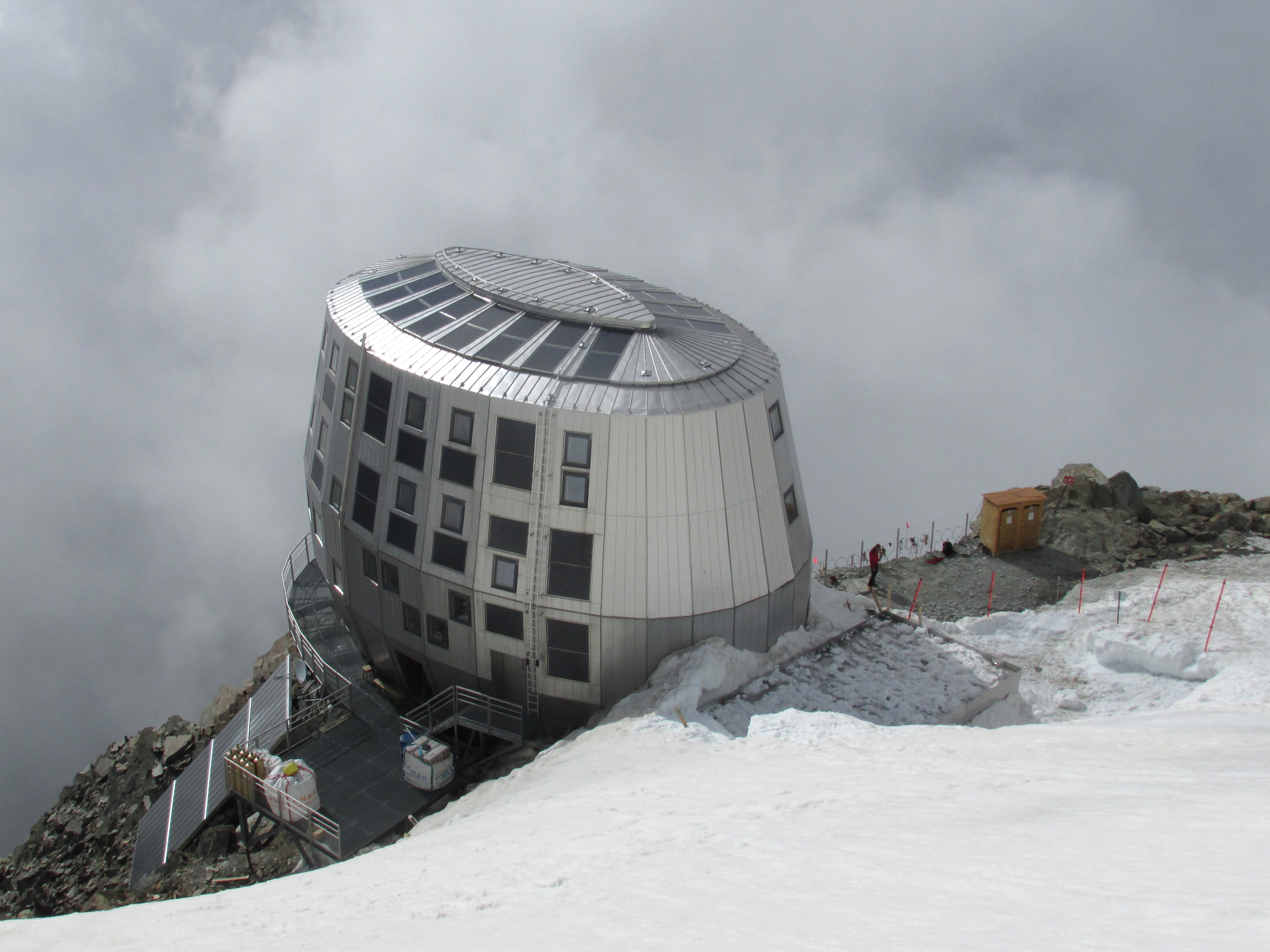
Behind the hut is a device to obtain water from melted snow.

== See also ==
- List of mountain huts in the Alps
