= Dôme du Goûter =

Mountain in the Mont Blanc massif

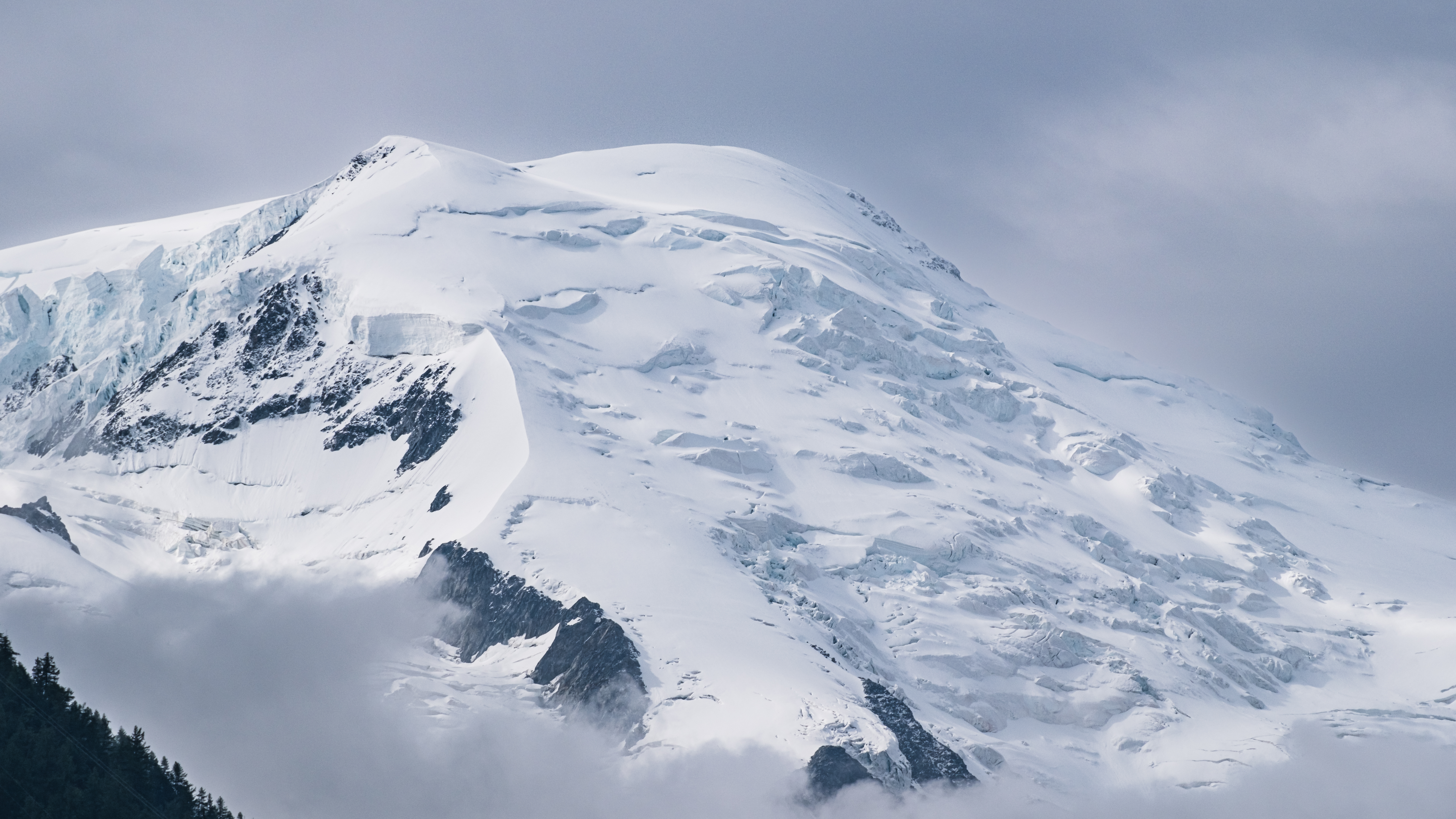
- The Dôme du Goûter as seen from Chamonix

Highest point
- Elevation: 4,304 m (14,121 ft)
- Prominence: 68 m ↓ Col du Dôme
- Isolation: 1.98 km → Mont Blanc
- Coordinates: 45°50′34″N 6°50′36″E

Geography
- Location within Alps
- Location: Haute-Savoie, France / Aosta Valley, Italy
- Parent range: Graian Alps

Geology
- Mountain type: Granite/Porphyry

Climbing
- First ascent: 17 September 1784 by Jean-Marie Couttet and François Cuidet
- Easiest route: From Refuge du Goûter, 3,817 m, (F)

The Dôme du Goûter (English: Afternoon Tea Dome) is a 4,304 m mountain peak in the Mont Blanc massif. It is a shoulder of Mont Blanc, whose summit lies two kilometres to the south-east. The Dôme is traversed on ascents of Mont Blanc via the Bosses route.

The summit of the Dôme is marked as lying entirely within France on the French Institut Géographique National (IGN) map , although on the Italian Istituto Geografico Militare (IGM) map the summit appears to lie on the frontier between France and Italy. In June 2015, Italian Prime Minister Matteo Renzi expressed repeated claims on the territory. The Swiss National Map, which covers the massif at 1:50'000 scale, shows both disputed areas around Mont Blanc and Dôme du Goûter in a neutral way, after previously following the French interpretation of the border until 2018.

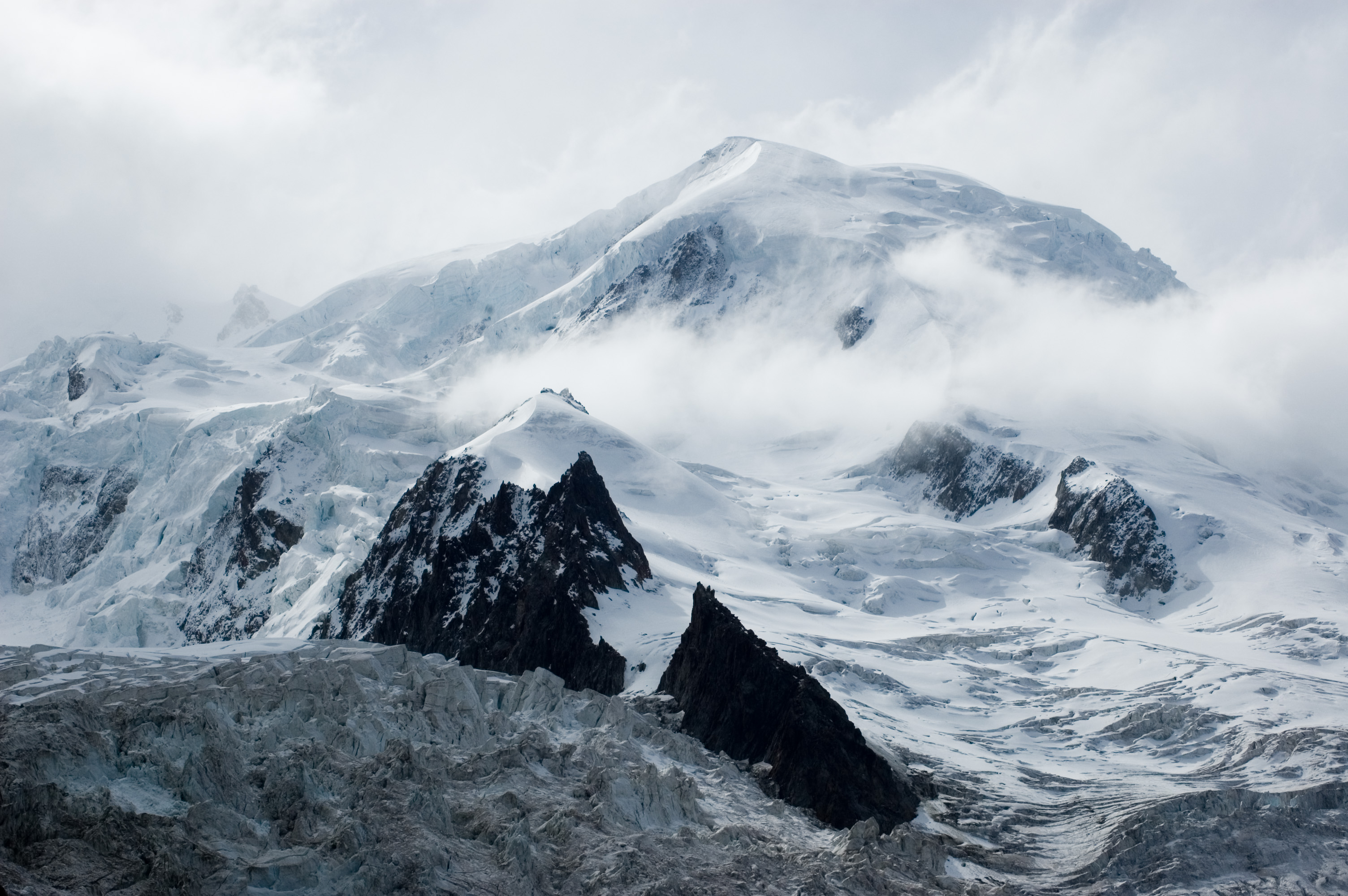
The summit of the Dôme du Goûter

== Goûter Refuge ==
In 2013, the Goûter Refuge opened, a mountain hut noted for its modern style. From the hut the summit of the Dome du Gouter is about two hours away by foot. The hut is located above the Aiguille du Gouter cliff and is constructed of wood and steel in a roughly egg shape. The older shelter was a more basic metal shed that sat on the ice, whereas the new building has supports drilled into the rock.

== See also ==
- List of 4000 metre peaks of the Alps
