= Nid d'Aigle station =

Terminus of the Tramway du Mont Blanc

Coordinates: 45°51′30″N 6°47′55″E

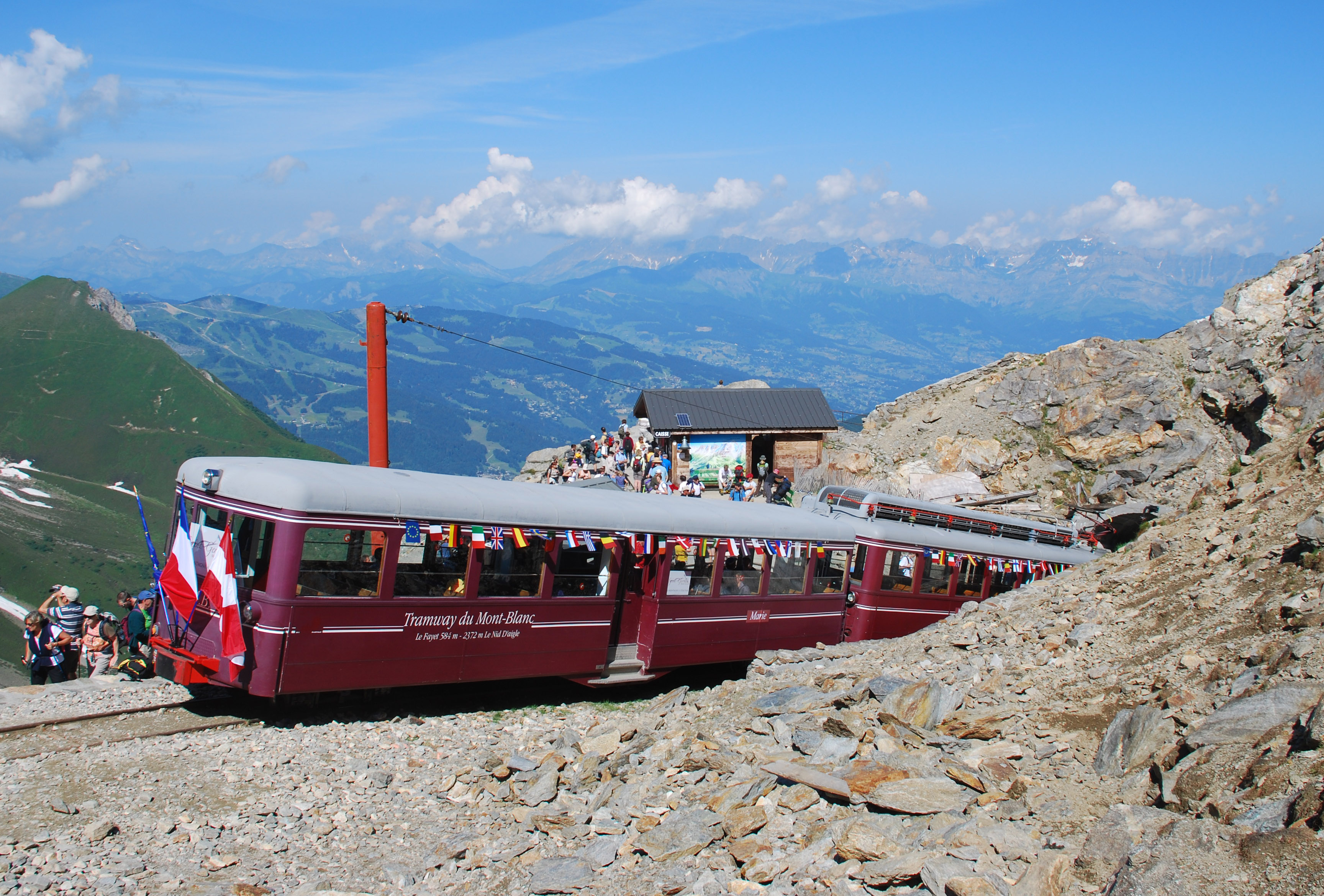
A tram stopped at the station

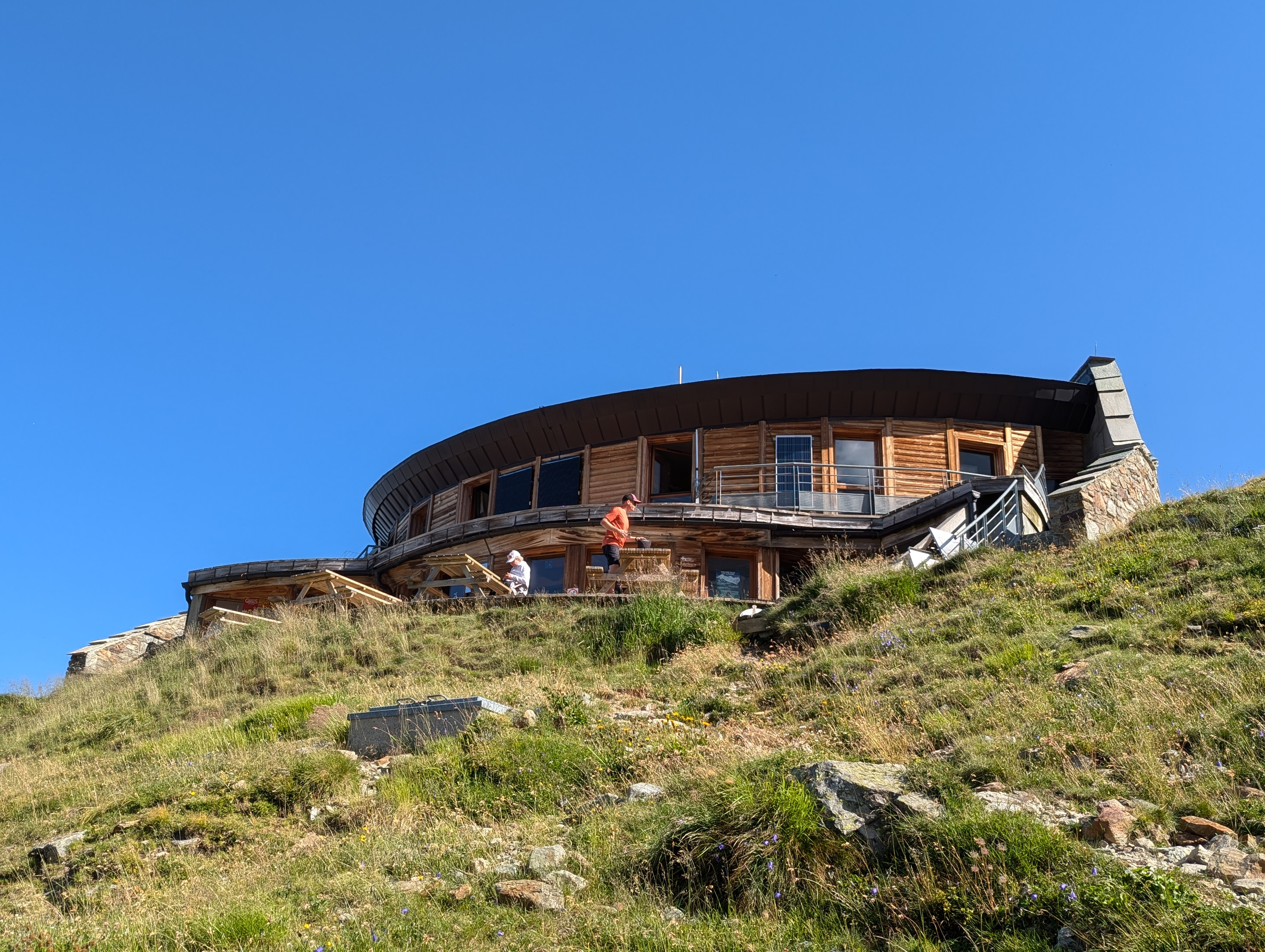
Nid D'Aigle refuge

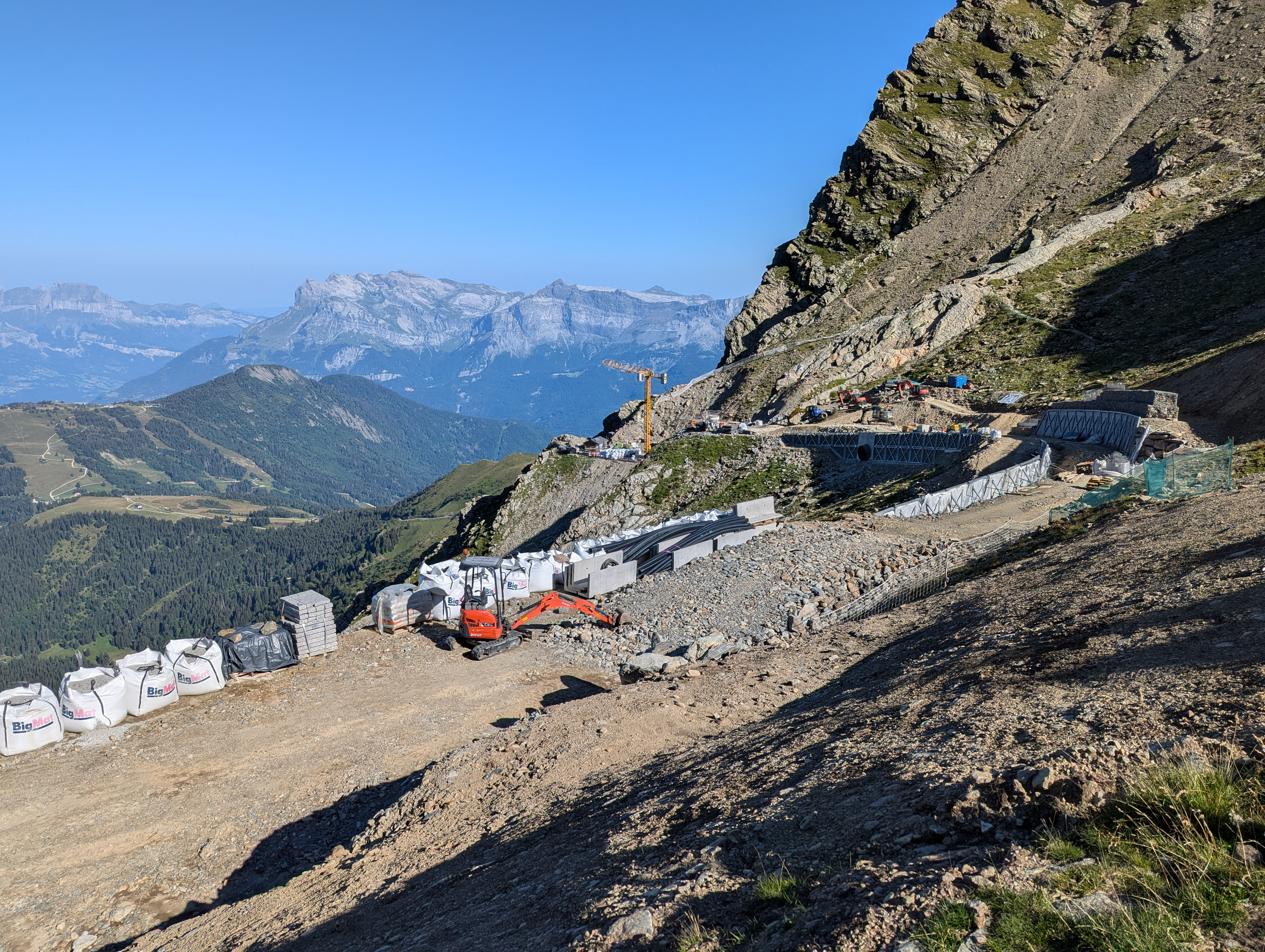
Work in progress at the Nid D'Aigle station in 2024

Gare du Nid d'Aigle (French: Eagle's Nest Station) is the terminus of the Tramway du Mont Blanc (TMB) from Saint-Gervais-les-Bains on the slopes of the Mont Blanc.

This station welcomes mountaineers as well as hikers at 2,362 m altitude below the glacier of Bionnassay. During the winter months the tram only stops at the lower Bellevue station, because of the avalanche risks.

A trip by tram from Le Fayet to this terminus lasts about three quarters of an hour and the panorama is remarkable. Here starts the modern normal route on the French side to the summit of Mont Blanc via the nearby refuge Nid d'Aigle, the Refuge de Tête Rousse and the Goûter Refuge.

The tramway terminus is also the finish location of the mountain run Montée du Nid d’Aigle, yearly in the month of July since 1986.

The first building of the station dated from 1933 and was destroyed by a fire in 2002.

Currently, work is in progress to extend the railway all the way to the Nid D'Aigle refuge.
