= Normal route =

Most often used route to climb a mountain

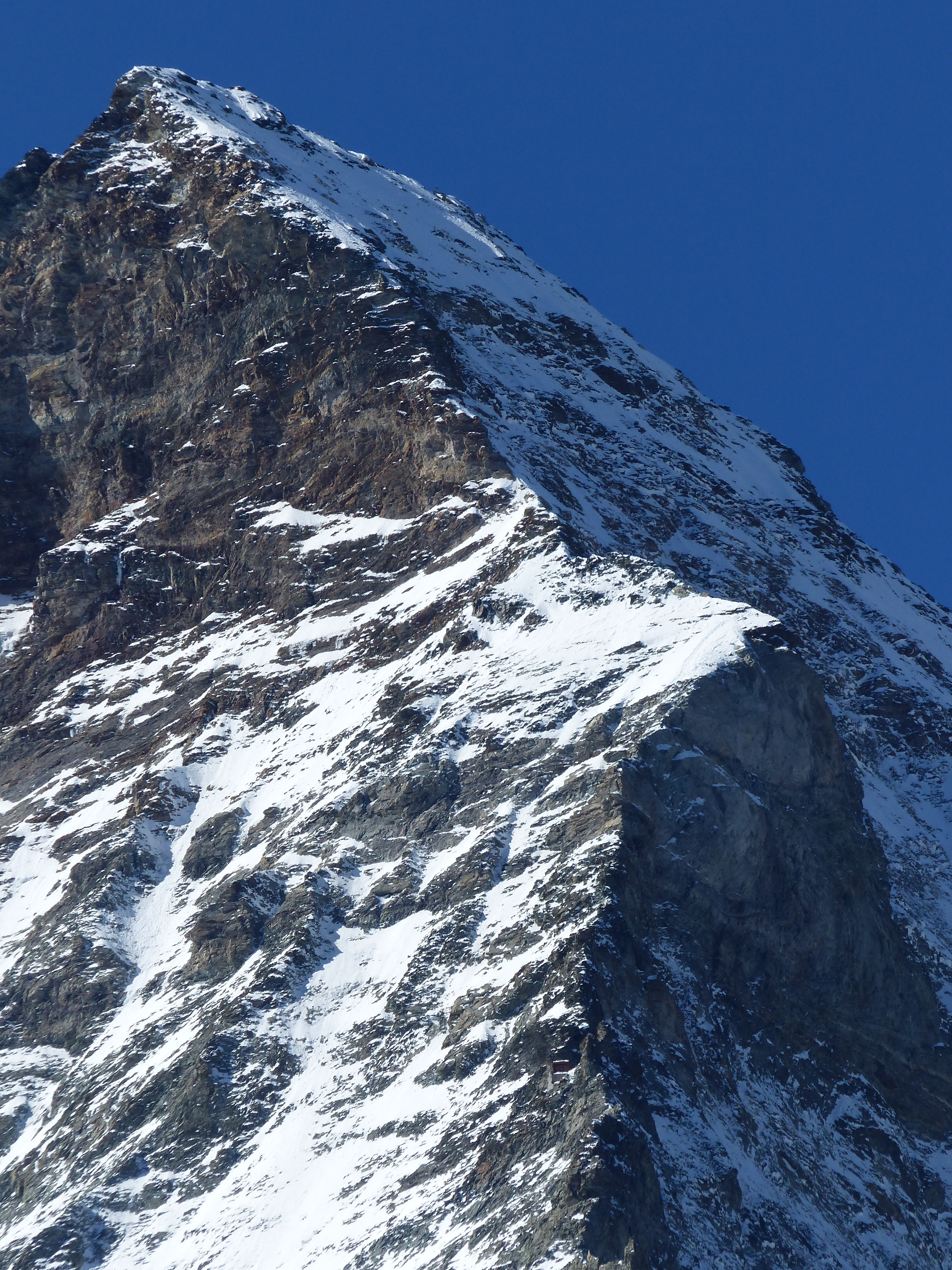
Although a serious alpine climbing route in its own right, the Hörnli ridge (1,220 m, AD III) of the Matterhorn is the "voie normale" that most climbers use to reach the summit.

A normal route or normal way (French: voie normale; German: Normalweg) is the most frequently used climbing route for ascending and descending a given mountain peak; it is usually the easiest route (though not necessarily easy, per se) and is often the most straightforward one—‌an example is the Goûter Route on Mont Blanc. Other generic names include the tourist route or trade route, and some climbing routes have specific 'normal route' names such as the "Yak Route" on Mount Everest.
