= Tête Rousse Glacier =

Glacier located in the Mont Blanc massif

Coordinates: 45.8559°N 6.8193°E

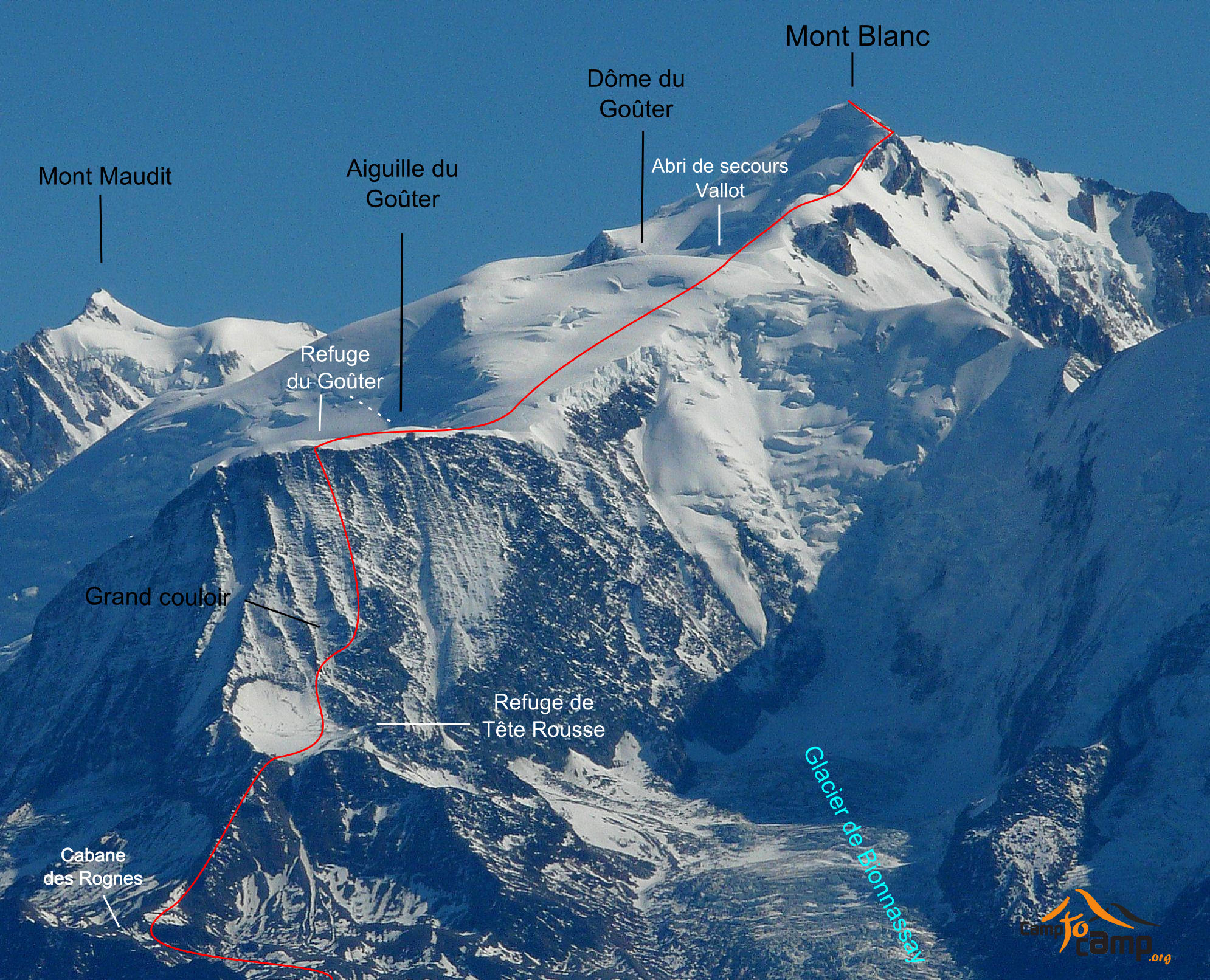
Mont Blanc and the Aiguille du Goûter, showing the small and roughly circular Glacier de Tête Rousse, located below the Grand Couloir and to the left of the Refuge de Tête Rousse

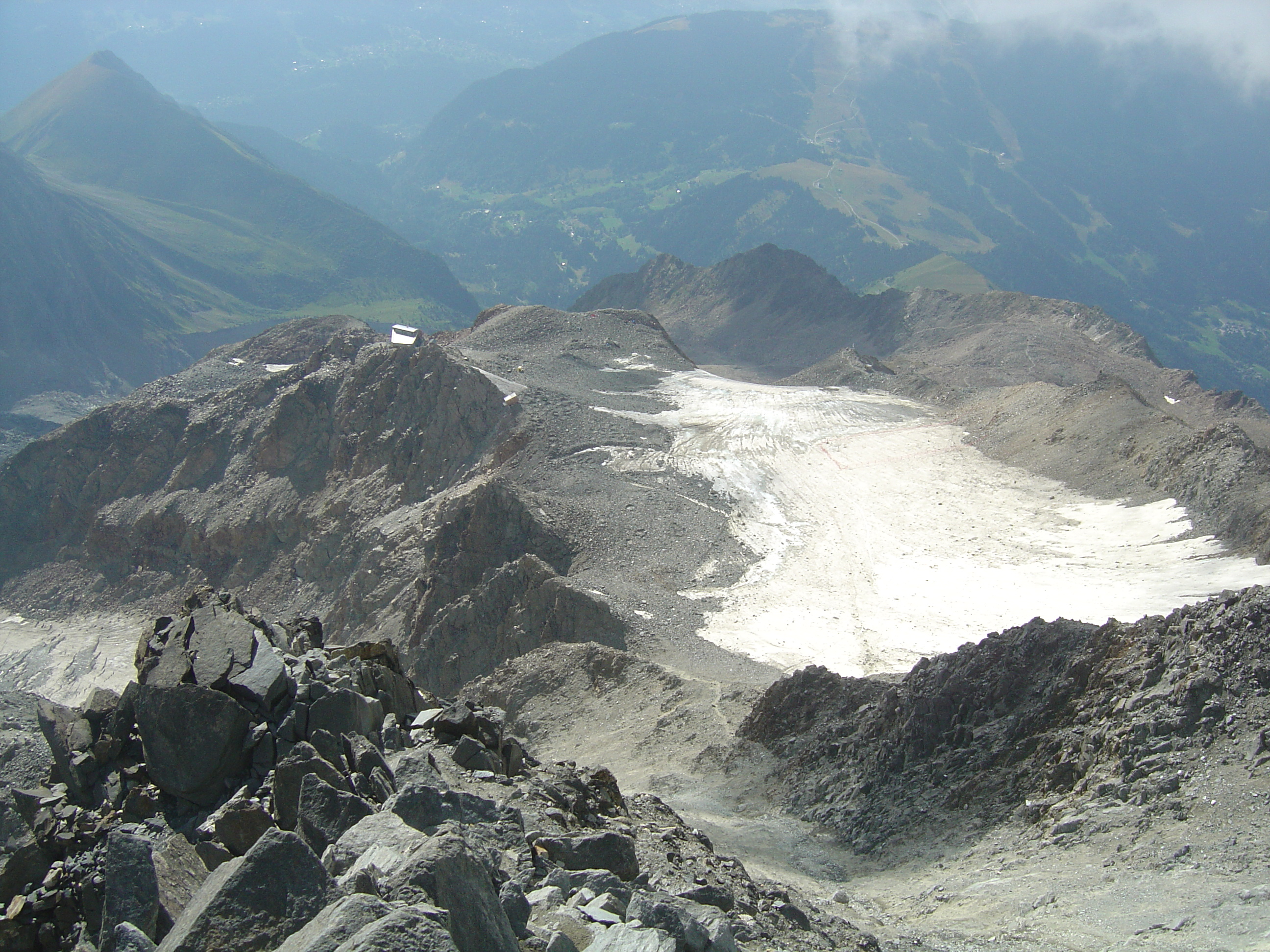
Looking down the Grand Couloir on the Aiguille de Goûter towards the Tête Rousse glacier and the valley settlements below

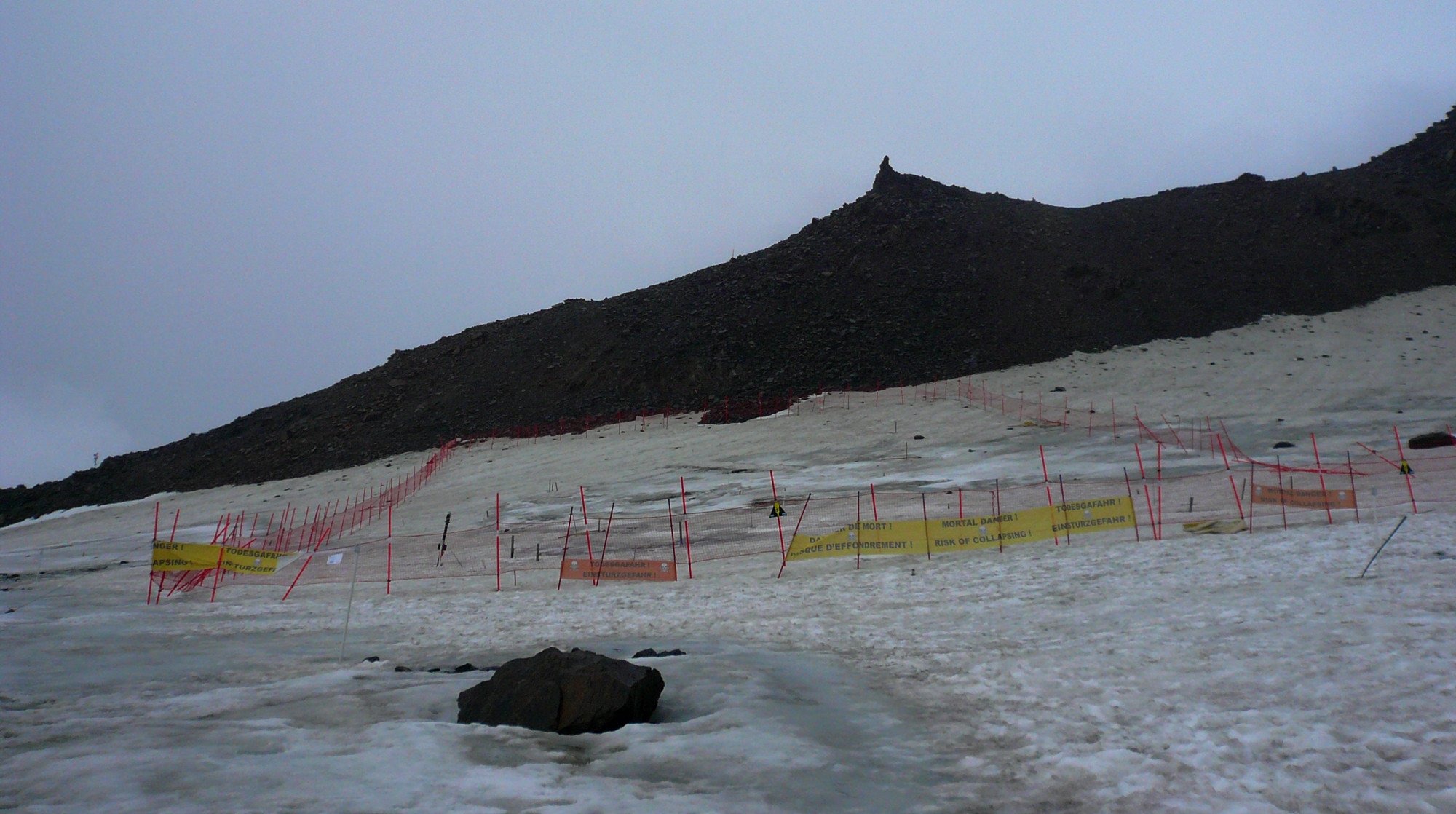
Fenced off area marking a collapsed section of the Tête Rousse glacier in 2011

The Tête Rousse Glacier (French: Glacier de Tête Rousse) is a small but significant glacier located in the Mont Blanc massif within the French Alps whose collapse in 1892 killed 200 (Note: A contemporary account by J Vallot, cited here, states over 200 deaths, although modern publications repeat a figure of only 175.) people in the town of Saint-Gervais-les-Bains.

== Geography ==
The glacier is located on the northwestern slopes of the Aiguille du Goûter, on the northern side of Mont Blanc and 11 km upstream of the town of Saint-Gervais. It lies at an altitude of 3,300 metres (10,800 ft), descending to a height of 3,100 metres (10,200 ft), and is predominantly avalanche-fed from snows falling from the steep slopes of Aiguille du Goûter above. As at 2007, the glacier had a total area of 0.08 square kilometres (0.031 mi^{2}; 20 acres) and a maximum thickness of 75 metres (246 ft)metres.

The glacier is frequently crossed by mountaineers on their way to the Tête Rousse mountaineering hut, which stands at the side of the glacier at an altitude of 3,167 metres (10,390 ft). It is also crossed by many more climbers attempting the 'normal' route of ascent to the summit of Mont Blanc via the Goûter route. The Tête Rousse Glacier lies just above the considerably much larger Glacier de Bionnassay, yet the build-up of large water pockets within this small glacier continues to pose a very serious risk to life to this day, and has been the subject of much research and disaster planning, with considerable investment in risk-reduction measures. The main risk to life comes from a repeat of the 1892 outburst flood which would impact upon those living in the valley below.

== 1892 Mont Blanc glacier flood ==
The Mont Blanc glacier flood was a devastating outburst flood that occurred on the early morning of 12 July 1892. The disaster took place at night-time when the Tête Rousse Glacier suddenly released 200,000 cubic metres (160 acre⋅ft) of water from large pockets of water which had accumulated within the structure of the glacier. The collapse of the glacier and sudden release of water completely destroyed the hamlet of Bionnay and flooded the bath house in the town of Saint-Gervais, reaching as far as the hamlet of Le Fayet. Contemporary accounts show that over 200 people lost their lives in the villages. Everything in the path of the rushing water, mud and boulders was swept away, leaving behind some 800,000 cubic metres (1,000,000 cu yd) of sediment.

Joseph Vallot, the glaciologist and Director of the Mont Blanc Observatory at the time of the incident, published detailed accounts of his investigations into the Catastrophy of Saint Gervais. Measurements and photographs taken shortly afterwards showed that part of the glacier's snout (terminus) had been torn away, revealing a cavity 40 metres (130 ft) in diameter and 20 metres (66 ft) above its base. From this a 3-metre-high (10 ft) tube led back some 85 metres (280 ft) and at a 36° angle to an even larger second cavity, up to 40 metres (130 ft) high and 50 metres (160 ft) wide. Maps drawn up shortly afterwards confirmed a depression in the centre of the glacier. It was estimated that 100,000 cubic metres (81 acre⋅ft) of liquid water had drained away during the glacier's collapse, plus a further 100,000 cubic metres (130,000 cu yd) of broken ice. Together with the soil and rock broken away by the force of the rushing water, Vallot estimated that a weight of 500,000,000 kilograms (500,000 t; 550,000 short tons) of material had borne down on the villages. He also warned that a repeat of water build-up was quite likely to occur, and that this would become more dangerous as time went on. He advocated the use of explosives to ensure a permanent flow of meltwater away from the glacier.

In 1904 a second water pocket was discovered within the glacier, and a hole was drilled to drain away 22,000 cubic metres (18 acre⋅ft).

Opinions have differed as to the precise mechanism by which water had built up in such quantity and then had suddenly been released with such devastating consequences. For many years the accepted explanation was that proposed by Joseph Vallot. It was believed that meltwater had drained through the glacier and become trapped as an intraglacial cavity, i.e. as an underground lake within a crevasse which itself had then become enlarged and widened by the water. However, recent re-analysis of historic photographs, accounts and contemporary meteorological precipitation data and field measurements, including radar analysis and magnetic resonance imaging, has presented an alternative and more plausible mechanism in which meltwater collected much closer to the surface (as a supraglacial lake) in a period when the glacier had a negative mass balance (i.e. was experiencing year-on-year melting and retreat). Prior to 1878 the glacier would not have been well-visited, so any surface lake could have gone unnoticed, and after 1878 the glacier experienced a positive mass balance (i.e. year-on-year accumulation of snow and ice) which would have hidden the lake from view until the eventual outburst flood in 1892.

== Modern day risks ==
In July 2010 a pocket containing 50,000 cubic metres (41 acre⋅ft) of water was detected in a glacial pocket, and some 48,000 cubic metres (39 acre⋅ft) of water were pumped out. A siren warning system was installed to aid evacuation of those at risk in the valley below, and evacuation plan was put in place. The final section of the Mont Blanc Tramway from St Gervais to Nid d'Aigle was closed for safety reasons for the rest of the operational season, as was the adjacent Nid d'Aigle mountain refuge.

In 2011 water levels within the glacier were predicted to refill the glacial cavity before summer, and a further 25,000 cubic metres (20 acre⋅ft) of water was drained away. Further research was carried out to study and monitor the origin of the water.

In 2012 results of research were presented showing that two water pockets existed within the glacier. On 17 August 2012 part of the glacier's surface collapsed inwards. This created a large hole through which a glacial lake could be seen. Paths across the glacier were diverted, including that used to reach the Gouter Hut and thence the summit of Mont Blanc.

At 1:47am on 29 July 2013 during a heavy storm, the alarm system on the glacier triggered, alerting the authorities to a serious flood risk. 95 firefighters and 70 soldiers of the gendarmerie were mobilised, and an evacuation plan put into effect, involving the townspeople of St Gervais, Sallanches and Passy Domancy gathering at pre-arranged assembly points. Inspection of the glacier revealed that no collapse had taken place and the warning notice was lifted at 4:30am the same night. Studies revealed that between 35,000 and 50,000 cubic metres (28 and 41 acre⋅ft) of water were present in the glacier.

By 2014 another build-up of a water pocket was discovered, and the Mayor of St. Gervais reported that, since its rediscovery, a total of 6 million euros had been spent in monitoring and pumping out water from the Tête Rousse glacier to protect the 3,000 inhabitants in the valley below.
