= Tête Rousse Hut =

Mountain hut in the Mont Blanc massif

Coordinates: 45°51′18.5″N 6°49′4″E

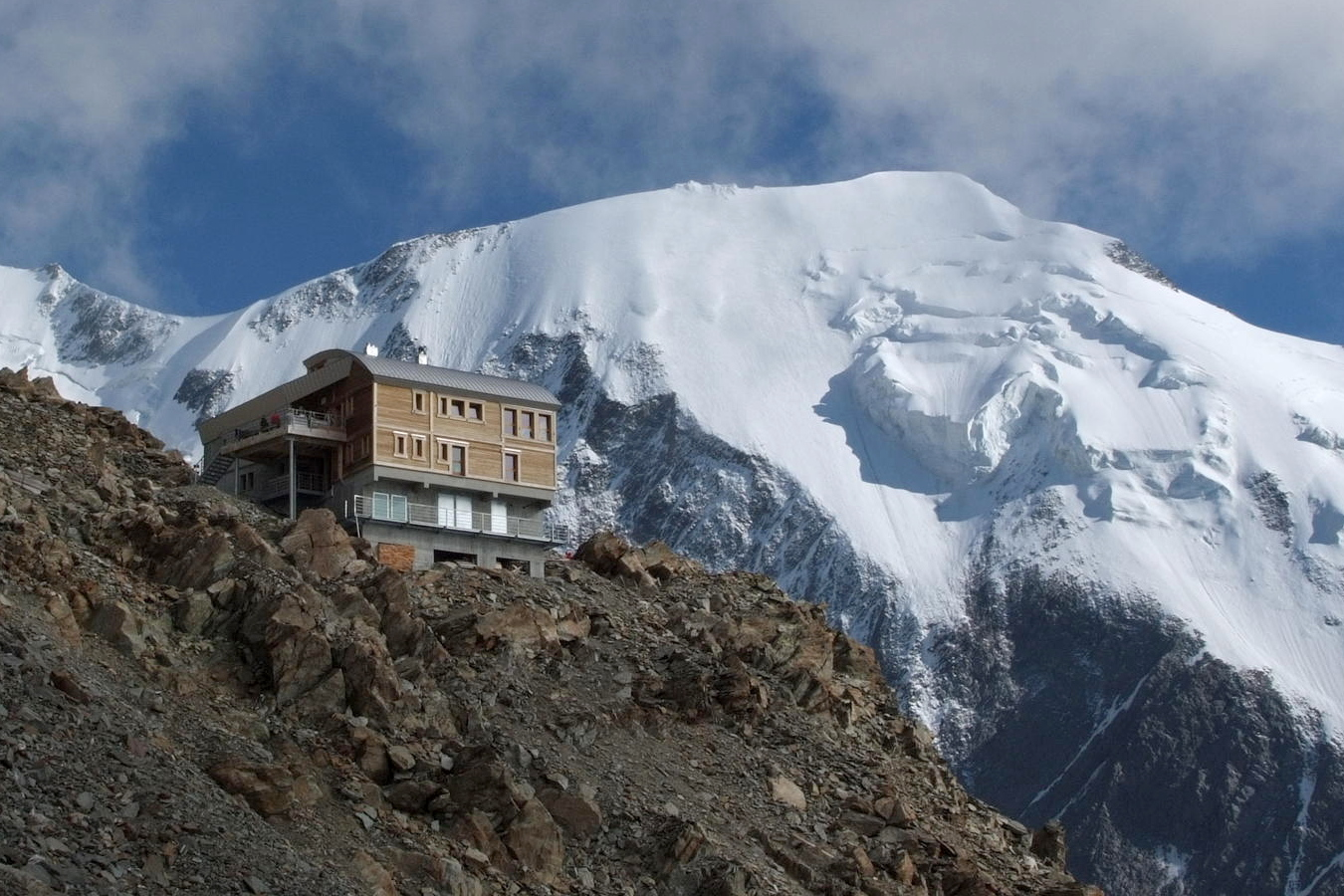

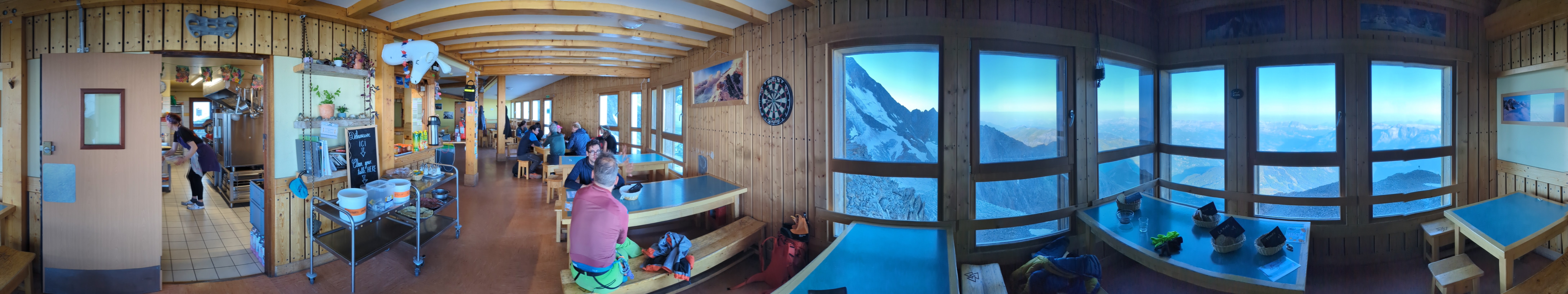
Common room

The Tête Rousse Hut (French: Refuge de Tête Rousse) is a mountain hut in the Mont Blanc massif in the French Alps. It is located beside the Tête Rousse Glacier at an elevation of 3,167 m. Owned by the Club Alpin Francais (CAF), it is normally reached after an approximately two hour climb from Nid d'Aigle, the highest stop on the Mont Blanc Tramway. It is commonly used by mountaineers attempting to climb the 'normal route' on the French side (Goûter Route) to the summit of Mont Blanc. Staying here, rather than continuing to the higher Goûter Hut adds an extra 2–3 hours to the ascent of Mont Blanc, but is less cramped than the latter and also avoids having to climb the dangerous 'Grand Couloir' later in the day when the risk of injury from stonefall is at its greatest.

The mountain refuge was completely refurbished in 2003 and can accommodate 72 people in summer and 16 people in winter. Because of the popularity of the Goûter route to ascend Mont Blanc, both huts only accept reservations in advance, and also require confirmation three days before arrival. Camping at high elevation is banned on this route; however, it is permitted on the snowfield above the Tête Rousse Hut. In 2019 a base camp was built on that snowfield where it is possible to spend the night, but it is required to have a reservation there also. Camping with a private tent is completely forbidden. Accommodation at the Tête Rousse Base Camp will include 6 group tents (of the “Himalayan Base Camp” type), each sleeping 8 people, which come equipped with camp beds, including pillows and duvets.

== Gallery ==
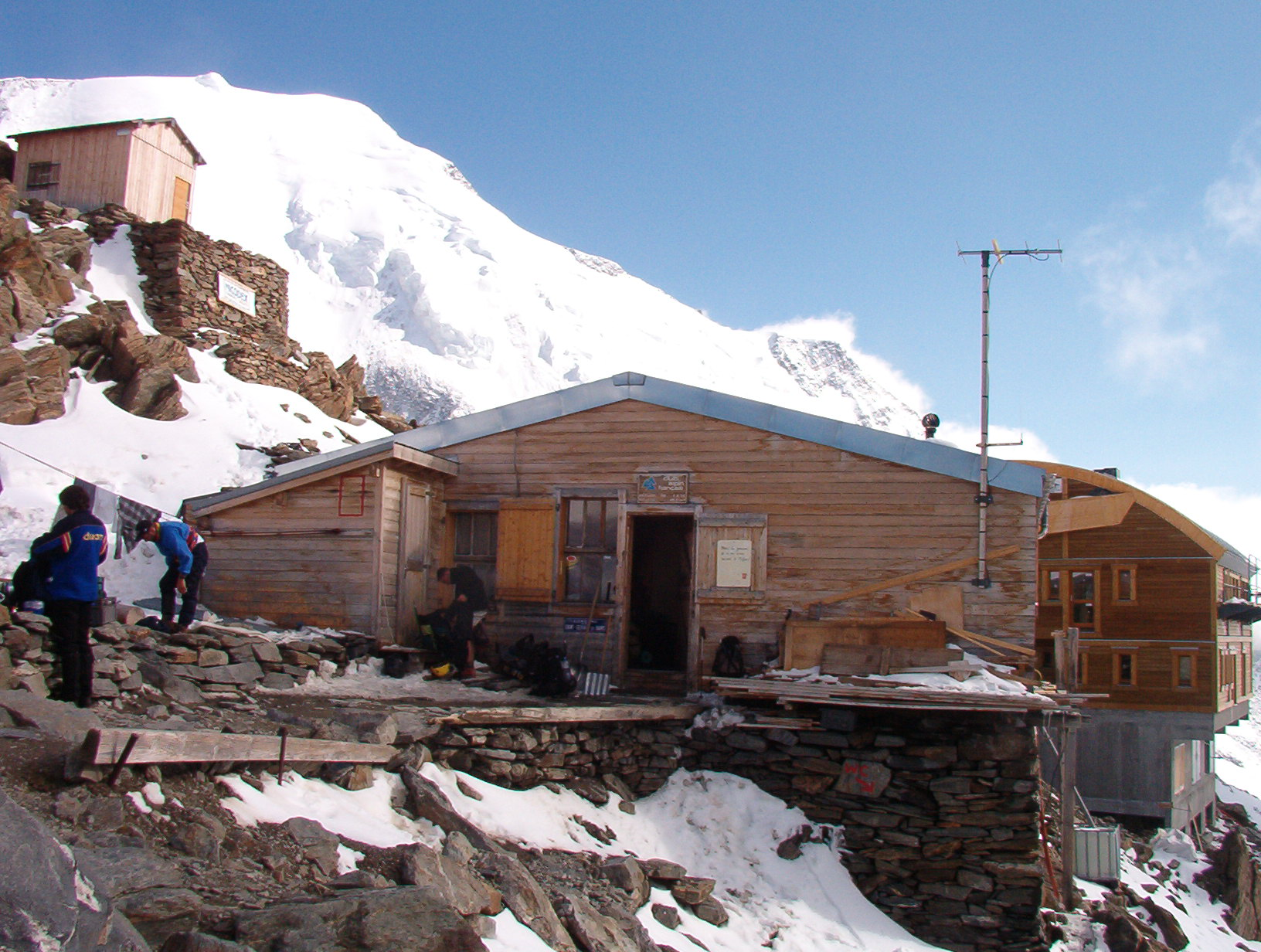
Old Tête Rousse Hut, now dismantled, with the new behind

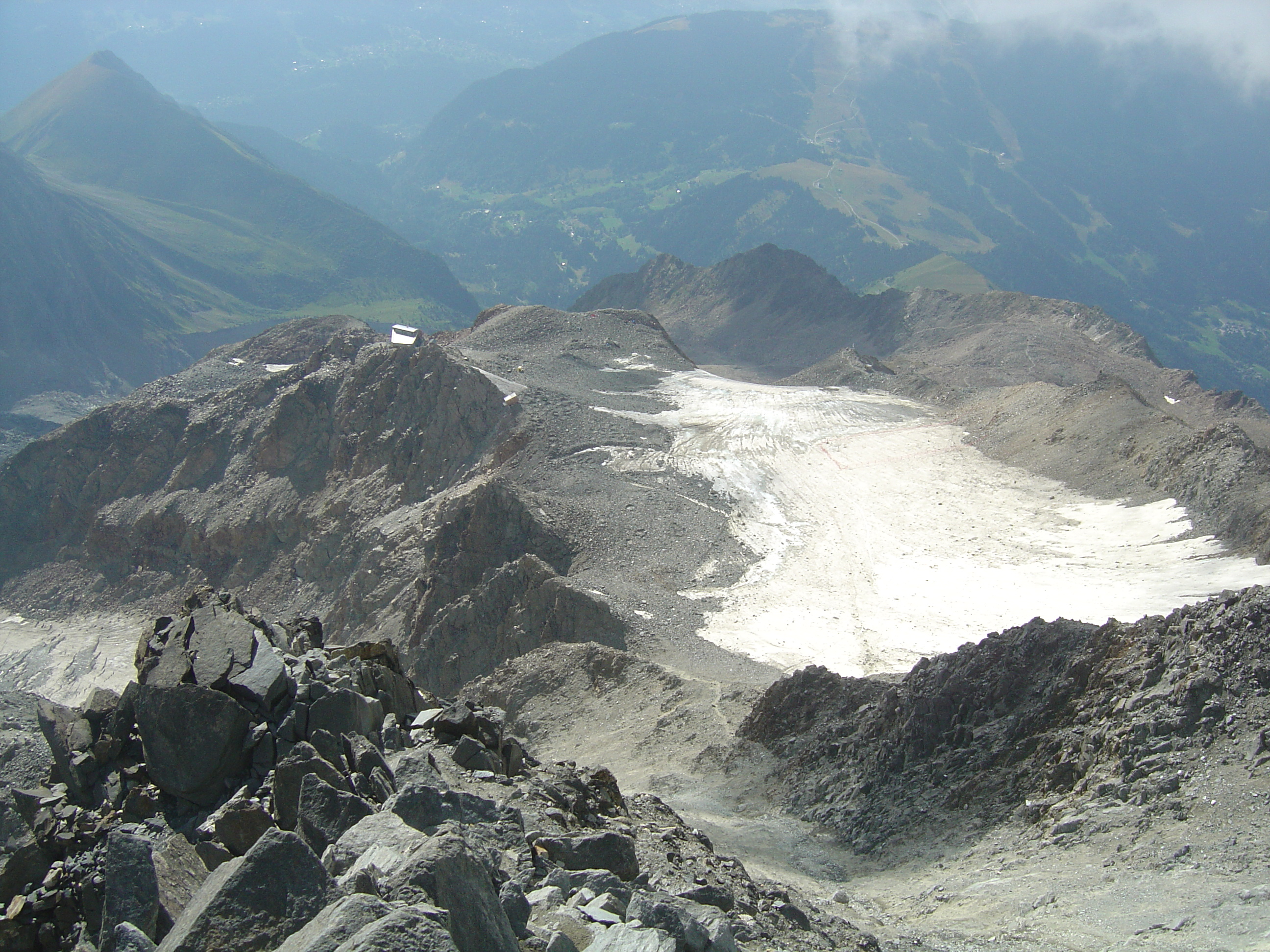
View down the Grand Couloir, looking towards the Tête Rousse Hut and the Tête Rousse Glacier

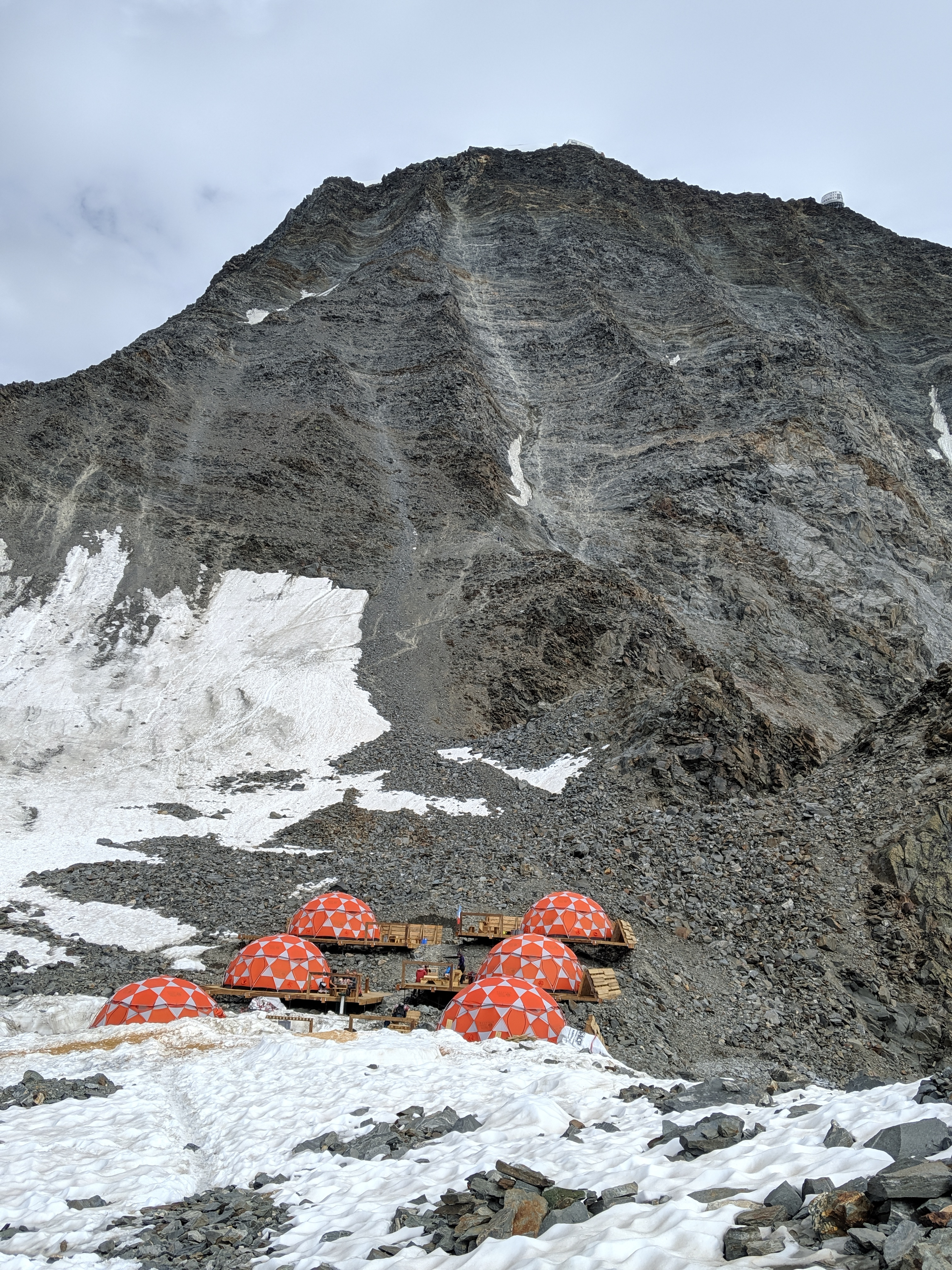
The Base Camp, with the Grand Couloir and the Gouter Hut in the background

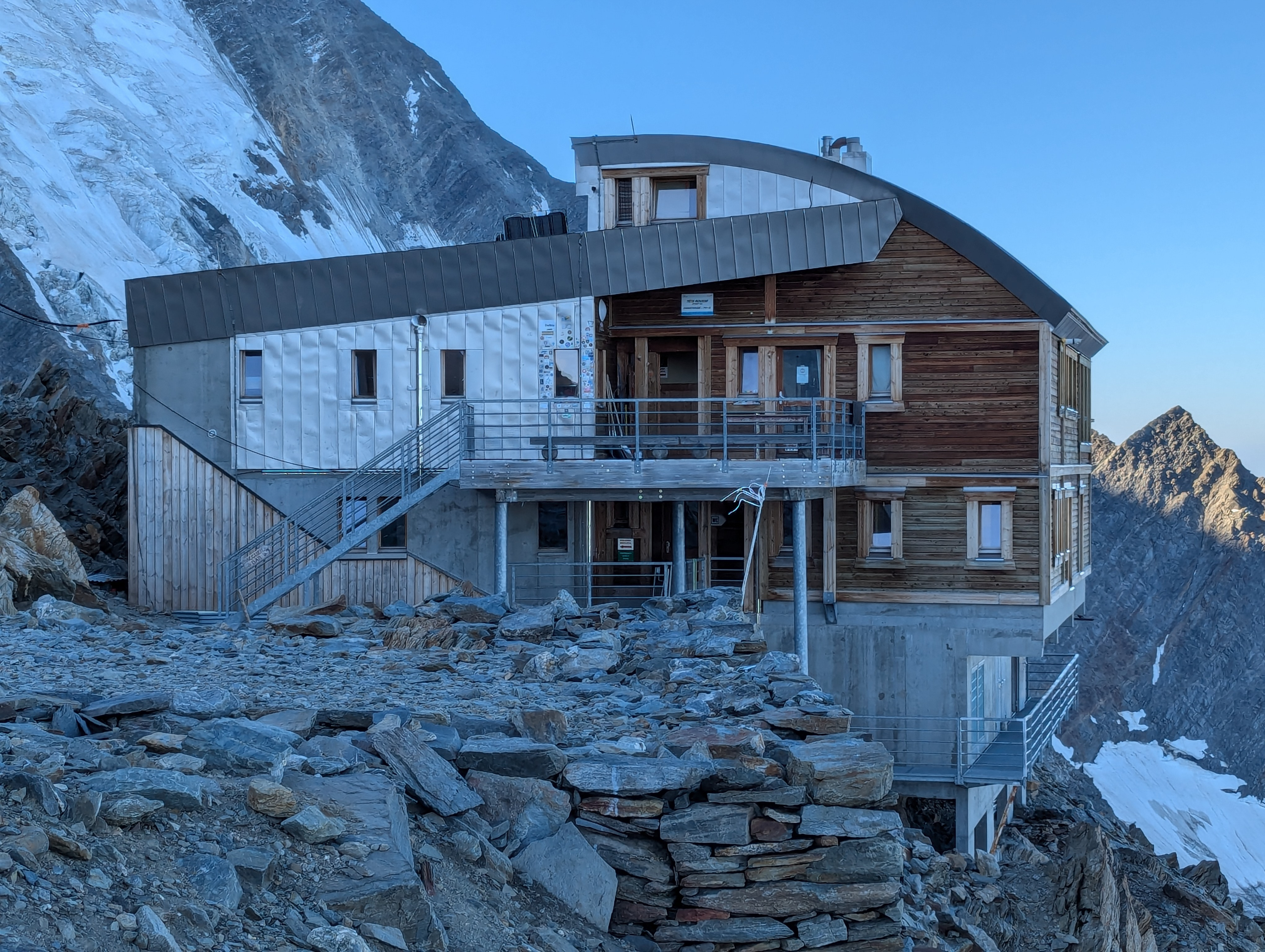
Tete Rousse refuge
