= Saint-Gervais-les-Bains =

Saint-Gervais-les-Bains San-Zharvé (Savoyard)
- Commune
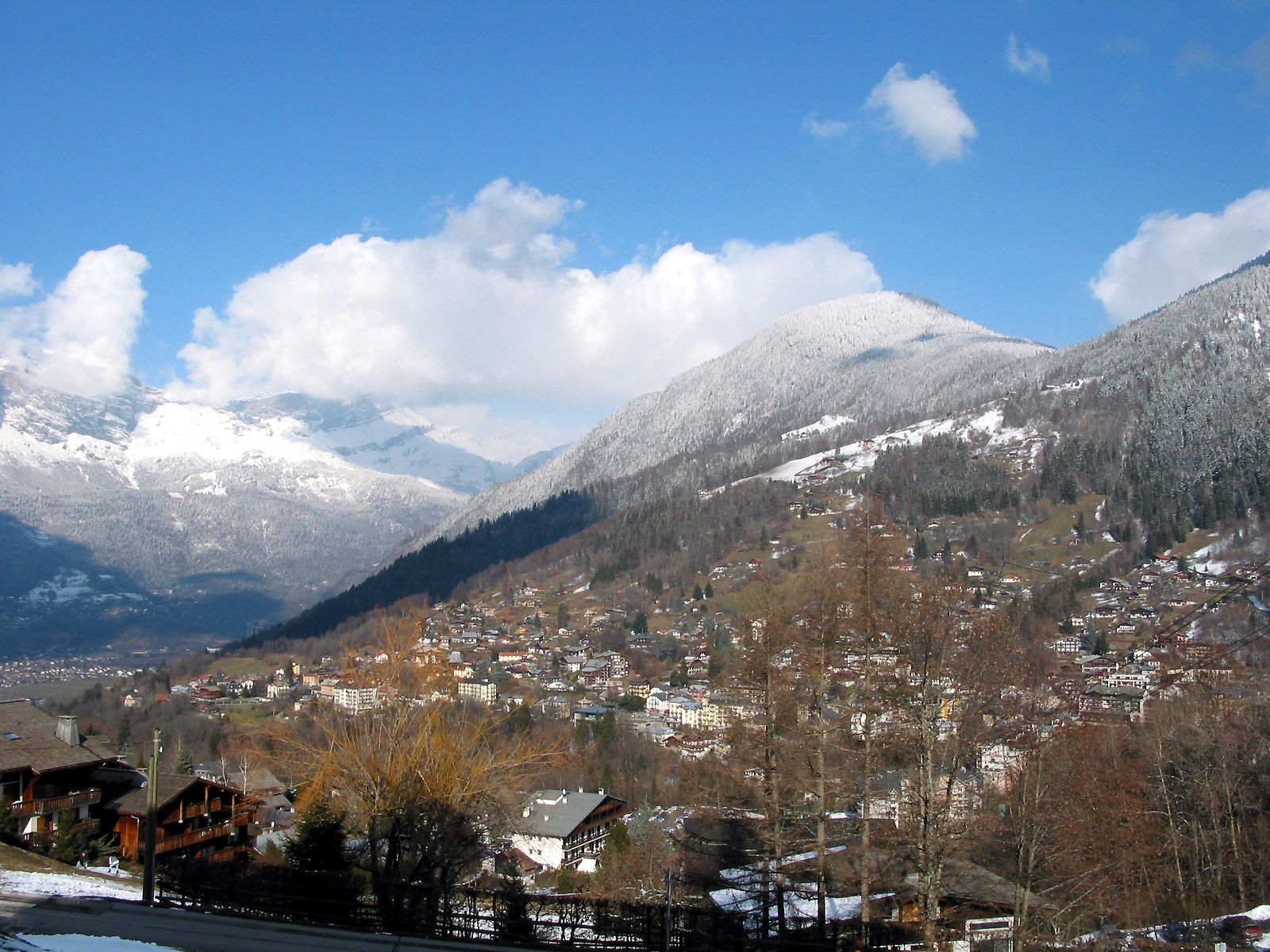
- A general view of Saint-Gervais-les-Bains

- Coat of arms
- Location of Saint-Gervais-les-Bains
- Location within France Location within Auvergne-Rhône-Alpes
- Coordinates: 45°53′36″N 6°42′50″E
- Country: France
- Region: Auvergne-Rhône-Alpes
- Department: Haute-Savoie
- Arrondissement: Bonneville
- Canton: Le Mont-Blanc
- Intercommunality: Pays du Mont-Blanc

Government
  - Mayor (2020–2026): Jean-Marc Peillex
- Area^{1}: 63.63 km^{2} (24.57 sq mi)
- Highest elevation: 4,810 m (15,780 ft)
- Lowest elevation: 571 m (1,873 ft)
- Population (2023): 5,755
  - Density: 90.44/km^{2} (234.3/sq mi)
- Time zone: UTC+01:00 (CET)
  - Summer (DST): UTC+02:00 (CEST)
- INSEE/Postal code: 74236 /74170
- ^{1} French Land Register data, which excludes lakes, ponds, glaciers > 1 km^{2} (0.386 sq mi or 247 acres) and river estuaries.

Saint-Gervais-les-Bains (French pronunciation: [sɛ̃ ʒɛʁvɛ le bɛ̃]; Savoyard: San-Zharvé) is a commune in the Haute-Savoie department in the Auvergne-Rhône-Alpes region, southeastern France. The village is best known for tourism and has been a popular holiday destination since the early 1900s. It has 445 km (277 mi) of pistes, the third largest domain exclusively in France, and is one of the least busy ski areas of its size. In 1892, two hundred people were killed when a water pocket in a glacier above the town suddenly burst open and caused flooding.

== Tourism ==
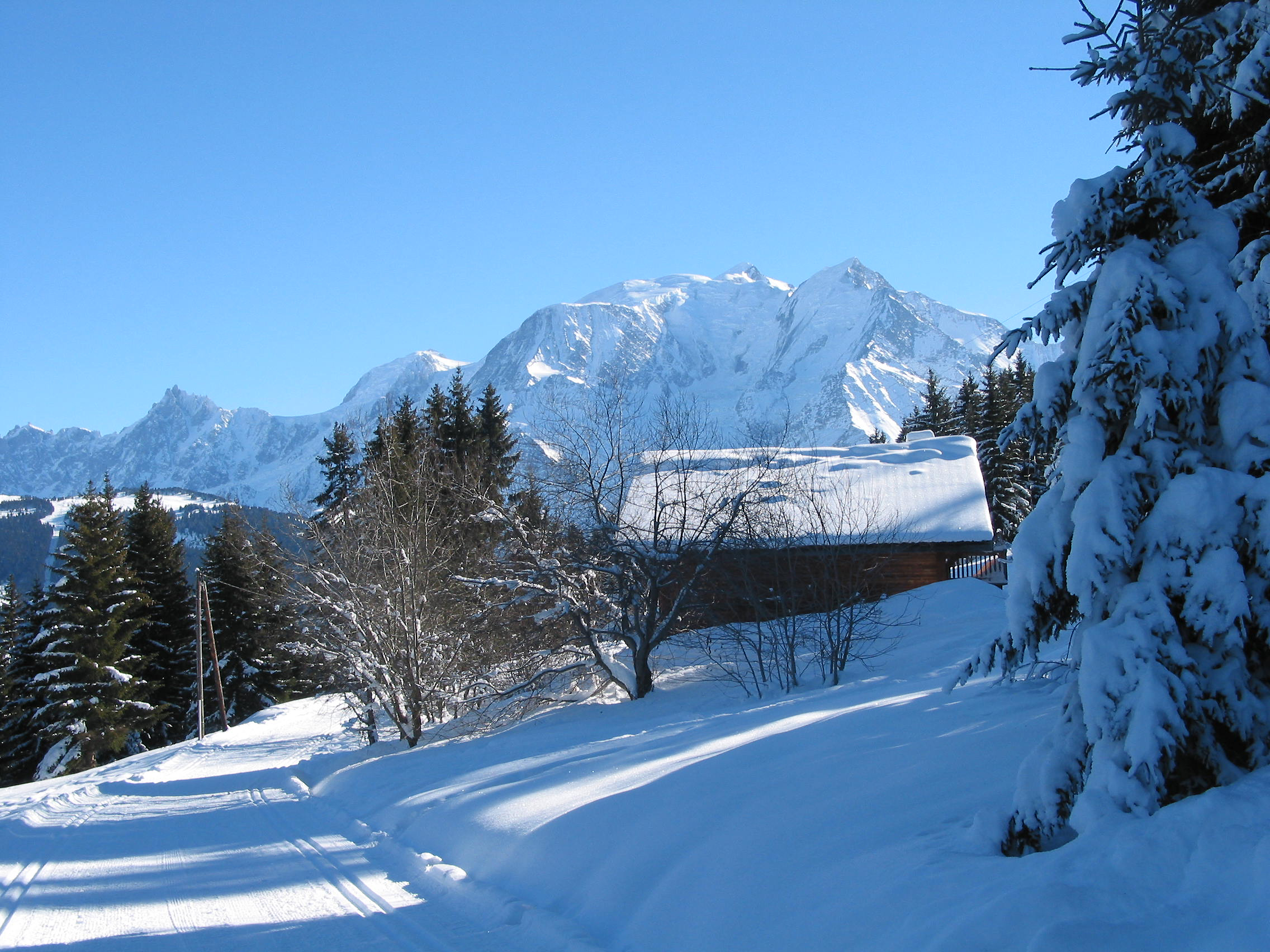
The Mont Blanc massif viewed from the locality of the "Pierre Plate"

St Gervais les Bains (also referred to as St Gervais or St Gervais Mont Blanc) is a traditional French market and spa town, not a recently purpose built resort, and so has a significant year round population, rather than just seasonal and is full of historical buildings giving it the traditional charm much sought after in the Alps.

In winter, the main draw is snow sports, and the resort has a multi-national client base. The summer sees tourists arrive from around the world to explore the fair weather alpine activities available such as mountain biking, climbing, hiking, paragliding, and rafting. Visitors also make use of the all year thermal spa 'Les Thermes' which sits within the 'Parc Thermal' in the lower village of Le Fayet.

There are no major tour operators bringing the mass market to the town and the majority of owner operated chalet operators that were offering catered accommodation to guests have now stopped whilst the remaining ones are independent "owner-run" chalets, whilst some new luxury chalets have been built and more are planned. Therefore, the town and the ski area, which is the 3rd largest in France with 445 km of piste and includes Megève, Combloux, Les Contamines and La Giettaz avoid the heavy congestion of some of this resort's neighbours. Investment in the ski area in terms of new lifts and snow cannons is high with 6 new 6 person express chair lifts in the last 10 years with the latest for the 2022/23 season. The STBMA, has been reappointed as Operator of the Saint-Gervais-Mont-Blanc Ski Area for the next 30 years with an investment program of €157,000,000 including €48,000,000 between 2019 and 2026. 2 additional new lifts are planned at present, one to link the thermal park to the town and the other to reduce traffic coming to the main cable car as it will link the mainline station in le Fayet to the main cable car and received the backing of the region in a visit in July 2020.

Property prices are generally less than that of some nearby resorts and demand for property is very high both for main homes and second homes.

== Transport ==
The main railway station for Saint-Gervais is the Gare de Saint-Gervais-les-Bains-Le Fayet. The Mont Blanc Tramway departs from the forecourt of Le Fayet station and reaches the Nid d'Aigle station at the Bionnassay glacier at an altitude of 2,372 m (7,782 ft). The Saint-Gervais–Vallorcine railway, a metre gauge line, departs from Le Fayet station and takes you to Chamonix and across the Swiss border to Martigny. Numerous other destinations throughout France (including direct trains to Paris) can be accessed from the main SNCF station in Le Fayet, and the main town centre is just a 10-minute descent to the nearby A40 Peage motorway to Geneva, Lyon, Paris and connecting to the rest of the French motorway network.

== Population ==
Historical population
Year	Pop.	±% p.a.
1968	4,503	—
1975	4,556	+0.17%
1982	4,661	+0.33%
1990	5,124	+1.19%
1999	5,276	+0.33%
2007	5,638	+0.83%
2012	5,599	−0.14%
2017	5,573	−0.09%
2023	5,755	+0.54%
Source: INSEE

== Notable people ==
The French ski jumper Marie Hoyau is a native of St. Gervais.

== The catastrophe of Saint Gervais ==
During the night of 11 July 1892, an underground water pocket burst out of the Tête Rousse Glacier on the slopes of the mountains above the town. It flooded the immediate valley, passing through the hamlet of Bionnay where the local school and other buildings survived, it by passed the town of St Gervais and flooded the Thermal establishment which was a residential establishment at the time in the Parc Thermal in Le Fayet, killing 200 people in its path. In 2010, the rediscovery of a large water pocket deep within the glacier caused alarm as it had the potential to threaten another outburst flood. Melt-water pumping, formal evacuation plans and installation of a siren alarm system in 2010 have all been implemented to reduce the threat to life. The risk zone was considerably reduced in 2017 thanks to the measures taken notable that the level of the glacial lake is controlled and pumped out if the water level rises, so reducing the threat to life and to property.

== See also ==
- Communes of the Haute-Savoie department
