= Aiguille du Goûter =

Mountain in the Mont Blanc massif

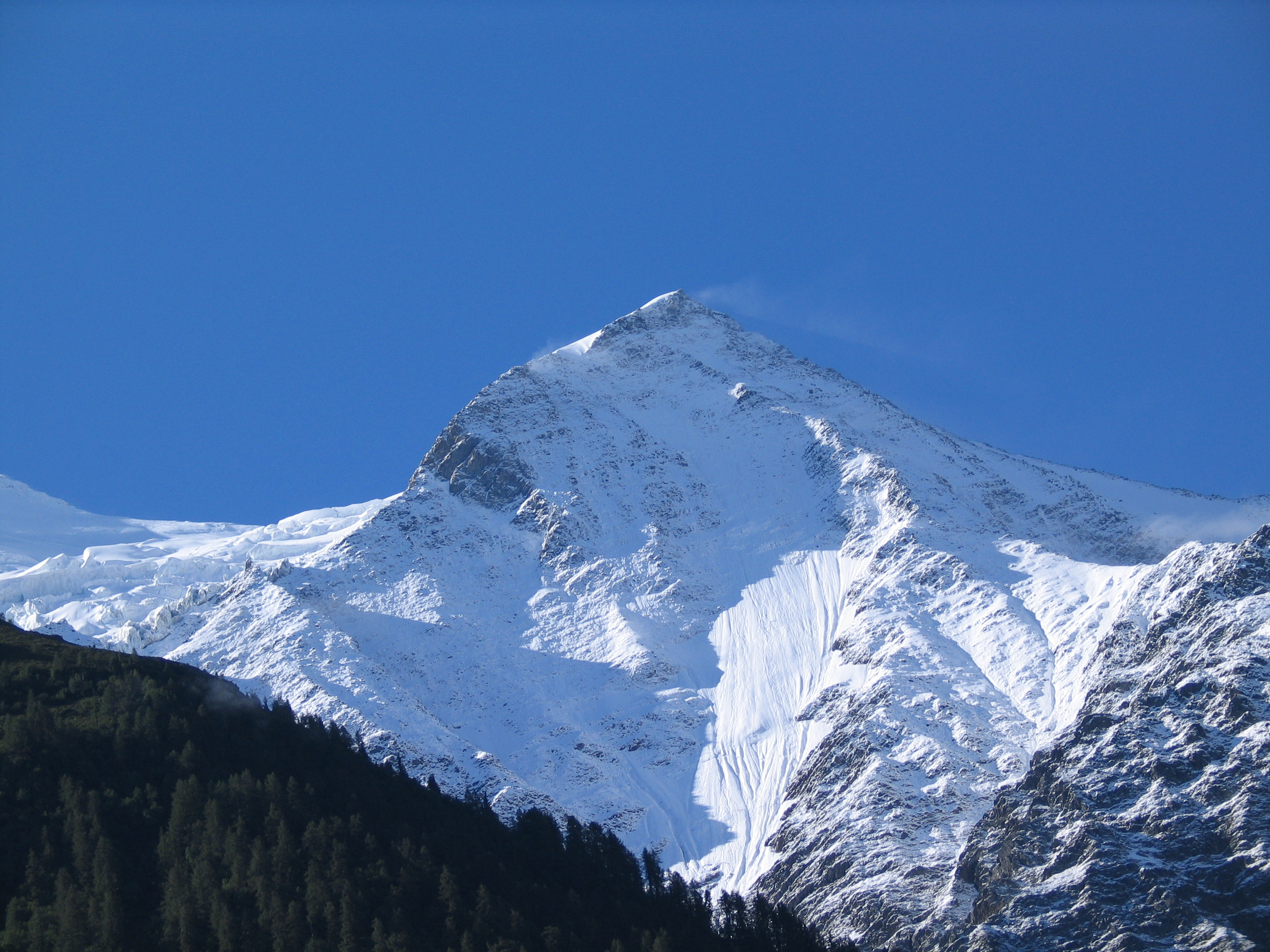

Highest point
- Elevation: 3,863 m (12,674 ft)
- Isolation: 0.32 km (0.20 mi)
- Coordinates: 45°51′02″N 06°49′52″E

Geography
- Location within France
- Location: Haute-Savoie, France
- Parent range: Mont Blanc Massif

Aiguille du Goûter (3,863 m) is a mountain in the Mont Blanc massif of Haute-Savoie, France.
