= Rocher de la Tournette =

Prominent rocky point on Mont Blanc

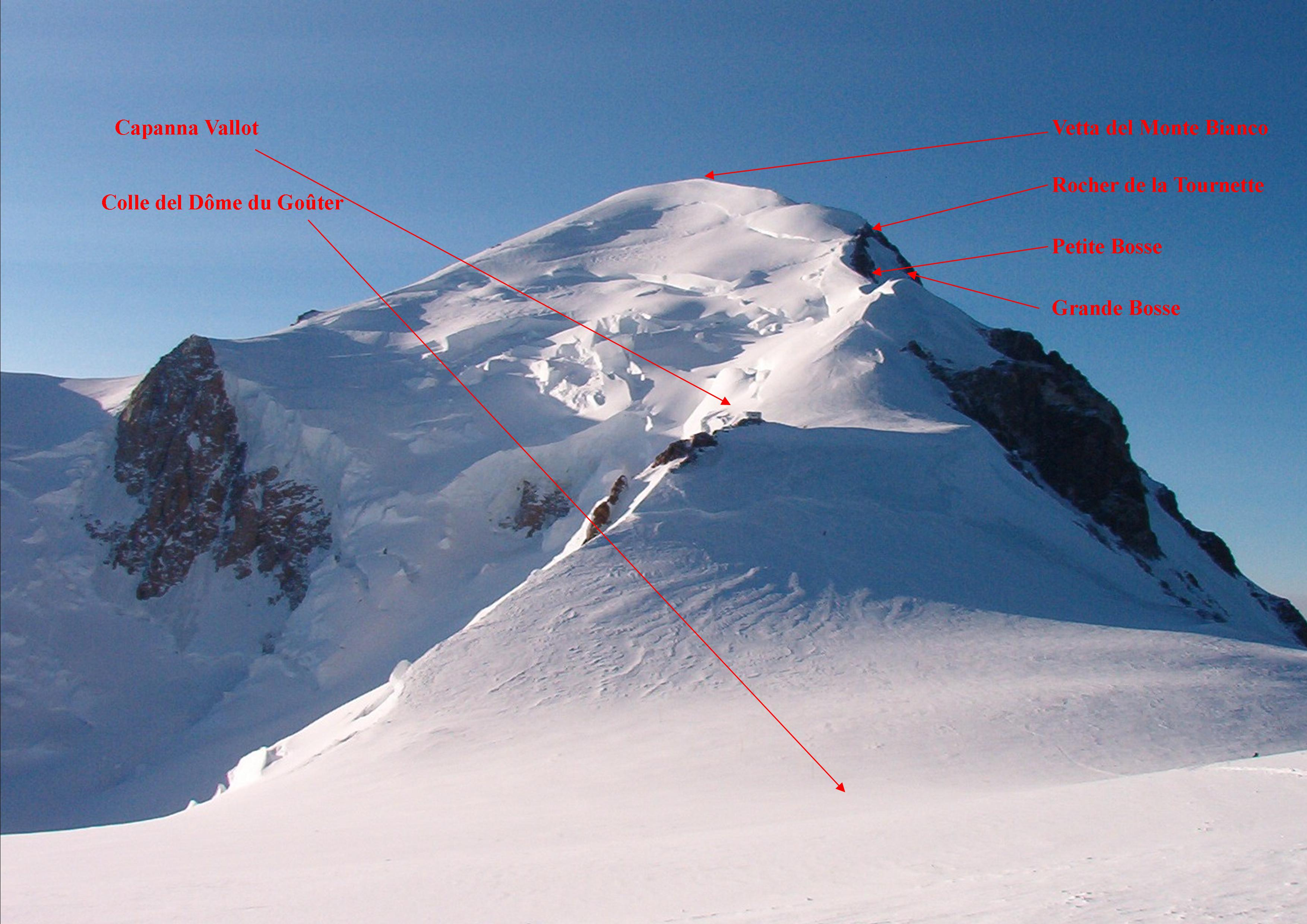
- Mont Blanc with Rocher de la Tournette shown on right hand skyline, below summit.

Highest point
- Elevation: 4,677 m (15,344 ft)
- Coordinates: 45°49′58″N 6°51′34″E

Naming
- Language of name: French / Italian

Geography
- Location within Alps
- Location: Aosta Valley, Italy / Haute-Savoie, France
- Parent range: Mont Blanc Massif

Climbing
- Easiest route: Goûter Route

The Rocher de la Tournette (or, simply, 'La Tournette') is a prominent rocky point on the icy summit ridge of Mont Blanc between the Petite Bosse and the summit. The highest point lies at 4,677 metres (15,344 ft) above sea level, and can be most easily reached on an ascent of Mont Blanc via the Goûter Route.

Whilst not sufficiently isolated from other summits to be regarded by the UIAA as one of the 82 primary 4000 metre summits of the Alps, the organisation does nevertheless include Rocher de la Tournette on its 'Enlarged list of lesser summits'. This list defines a further 46 such points of secondary mountaineering or morphological interest, of which the Rocher de la Tournette is the highest.

The shoulder of this rocky subsidiary summit offers a remote mountaineering route from the Quintino Sella Hut. Known as the Tournette Spur (fr: l’éperon de la Tournette), it enables the final 'Bosses Ridge' section of the Goûter Route to be reached from the Italian side of Mont Blanc. This infrequently climbed route is nowadays graded AD on the adjectival climbing scale and was first climbed on 2 July 1872 by T Kennedy, J Carrel and J Fischer. The first winter ascent of the Tournette Spur was made by the three Sella brothers and their guides, including Emile Rey on 5 January 1888.

== Air crash site ==
The Lockheed Constellation Malabar Princess (Air India Flight 245) crashed near the Rocher de la Tournette on November 3, 1950, killing all 48 passengers and crew members, a tragedy which inspired the 1952 novel La Neige en deuil (The Snow in mourning) by Henri Troyat, (adapted to the cinema in 1956), as well as the movie Malabar Princess in 2004.

A second accident occurred on 24 January 1966, involving Air India Flight 101, a Boeing 707 which struck the outcrop in the same sector, resulting in the deaths of all 117 passengers and crew members. In 2013, this crash inspired a novel by Marc Levy, Un sentiment plus fort que la peur (A feeling stronger than fear, English translation 2013, also under the title Stronger than Fear).

== See also ==
- Top of the Mont Blanc
