= Petite Bosse =

Snowy bulge on the border of France and Italy

The Petite Bosse (French pronunciation: [pətit bɔs]; 'Little Hump') is a snowy bulge, culminating at 4,547 m, on the border of France and Italy on the so-called normal routes towards the summit of Mont Blanc (the Bosses Ridge), between the Grande Bosse and the rocky protrusion known as the Rocher(s) de la Tournette. These humps, together called les Bosses, are not regarded by the UIAA as primary 4000 metre summits of the Alps, but the organisation does nevertheless include them on its 'Enlarged list of lesser summits'. It is the last elevating obstacle to be scaled by climbing parties on the final part of the itinerary to the top shared by the popular Goûter Route and the Grand Mulets Route.

== See also ==
- Top of the Mont Blanc
- Rocher de la Tournette
