= Top of the Mont Blanc =

Rock specimen cut from Mont Blanc in 1787

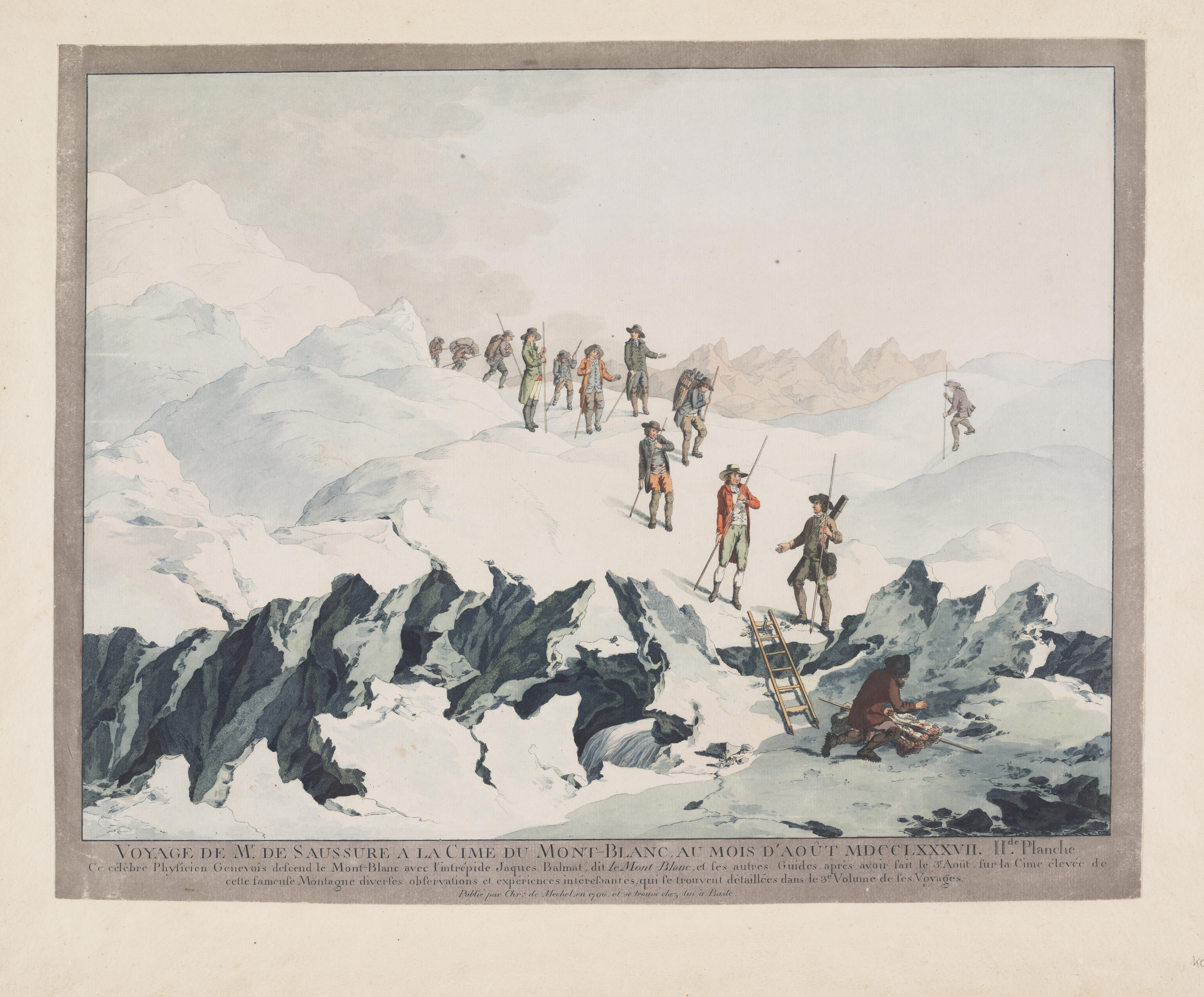
Descent from the Mont Blanc in 1787 by H.B. de Saussure Copperplate engraving, by Christian von Mechel

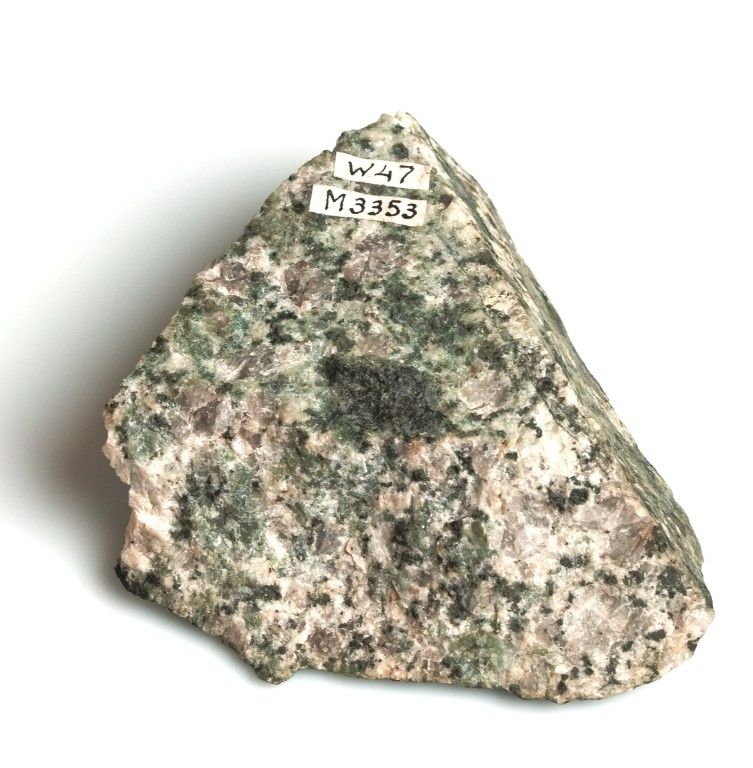
The "Top of the Mont Blanc" on display in Teylers Museum

The so-called Top of the Mont Blanc is a collection piece on display in the Oval Room of Teylers Museum. The specimen was cut off from the highest findable piece of exposed rock of the Rocher de la Tournette, 4,677 metres (15,344 ft) high on the snow covered summit ridge of the Mont Blanc on 3 August 1787, during one of the first climbs of the mountain by the Swiss scientific pioneer Horace Bénédict de Saussure.

== The climb ==
The climb was the second known to reach the top of Mont Blanc after Michel-Gabriel Paccard and Jacques Balmat had already reached the summit a year before, and included around 20 people including De Saussure, his servant and several guides and carriers. The climbing mission was a scientific expedition, during which De Saussure undertook research and executed physical experiments (among other things) on the boiling point of water at different heights. He calculated the height at each of his experiments by measuring how long it took an alcohol burner to boil an amount of water, and by these means he determined the height of the mountain to be 4775 metres. (This later turned out to be 32 metres less than the actual height of 4807 metres). For these experiments De Saussure brought specific scientific equipment, such as a barometer and thermometer. His calculated boiling temperature of water at the top of the mountain was fairly accurate, only off by 0.1 Kelvin.

== Acquisition of the exhibition pieces ==
Teylers Museum was founded just before the climb took place, and at the time serious progress was being made in the research of bedrocks and minerals. The term "geology" was coined by the very initiator of this expedition, De Saussure, and the science was becoming more popular. At that time the museum was still very young and it actively collected knowledge and objects around it and put them on display.

Martinus van Marum acquired the piece from the top of Mont Blanc as well as several other objects from this climb in the fifteen years following it. In 1799, on behalf of the museum, he had already purchased a maquette of Mont Blanc for nine guilders. It had been created in 1787 by the Swiss Charles François Exchaquet and displayed the expedition as well. Although several maquettes were produced at the time, as of 2012 there are only two known to remain - one at Teylers Museum, and one in the Muséum d'histoire naturelle de la Ville de Genève. The maquette is believed to be an accurate representation of the mountain and the nearby valley of Chamonix and is 100 by 64 by 35 cm in size, on a 1:15000 scale. Although the dimensions of the maquette are as accurate as possible, the colors are not - they are more informative than accurate. Several drawings and engravings of the view and the expedition were also acquired by Van Marum to complete the set for exhibition. In 1802 he bought the actual "top of the Mont Blanc" together with several other geological samples from Theodore de Saussure (son of the famous geologist), who put together a collection of samples from his father's rocks. The Mont Blanc rock (a biotite granite) is on display together with other rocks in the central showcase of the Oval Room. The maquette is also on display in the same room.

== In popular culture ==
In 2007 a fictional short film by Mels van Zutphen, titled The tip of Mont Blanc about bringing "the top of the mountain" back to Mont Blanc, was screened at the Dutch Film Festival.

== See also ==
- History of geology
