= Air India Flight 101 =

1966 aviation accident in France

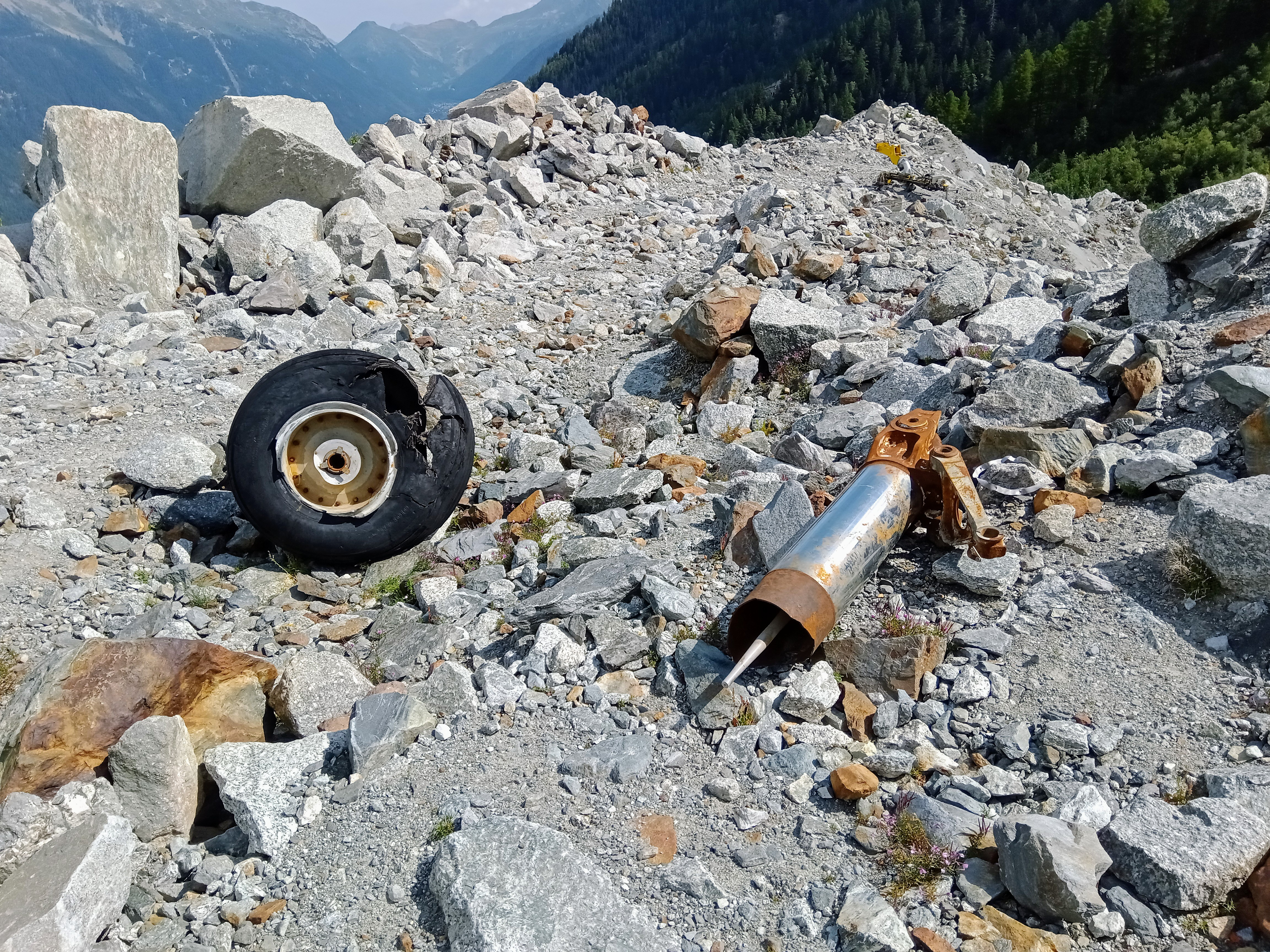
- Wreckage of the aircraft in 2023

Accident
- Date: 24 January 1966
- Summary: Controlled flight into terrain
- Site: Mont Blanc massif, France; 45°52′40″N 06°52′00″E

Aircraft
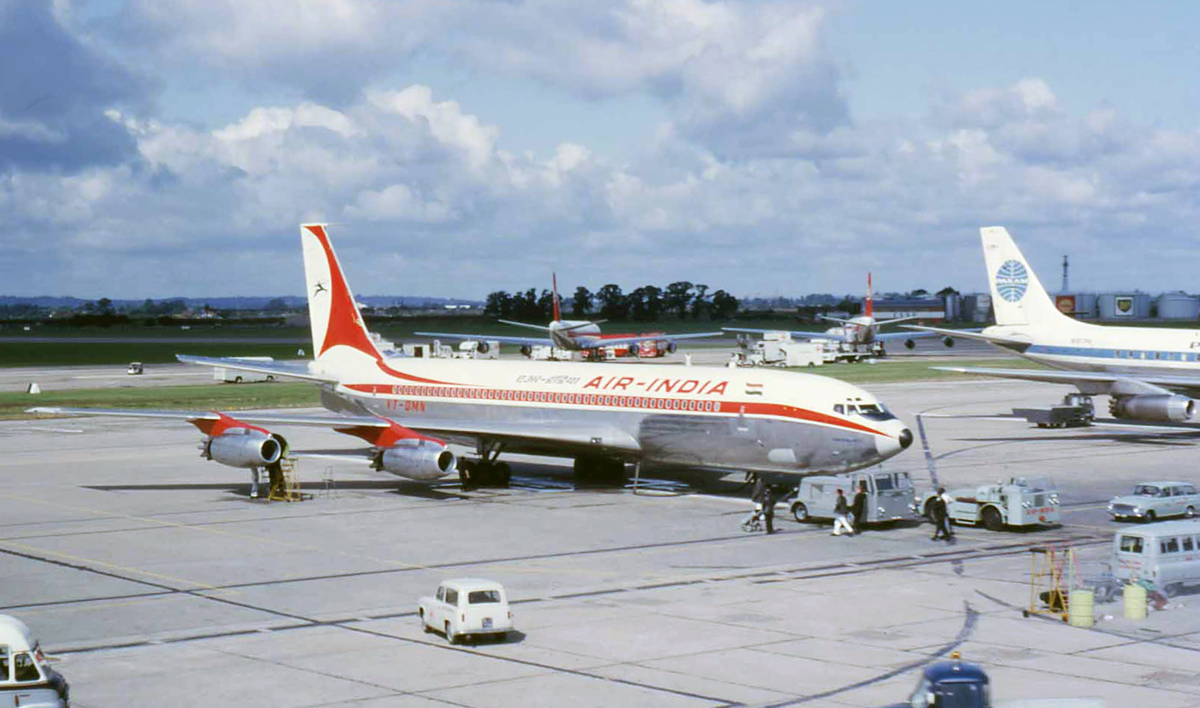
- VT-DMN, the aircraft involved in the accident, seen in 1965
- Aircraft type: Boeing 707-437
- Aircraft name: Kanchenjunga
- Operator: Air India
- IATA flight No.: AI101
- ICAO flight No.: AIC101
- Call sign: AIRINDIA 110
- Registration: VT-DMN
- Flight origin: Santa Cruz International Airport, Bombay, India
- 1st stopover: Delhi International Airport, New Delhi, India
- 2nd stopover: Beirut International Airport, Beirut, Lebanon
- Last stopover: Geneva International Airport, Geneva, Switzerland
- Destination: Heathrow Airport, London, United Kingdom
- Occupants: 117
- Passengers: 106
- Crew: 11
- Fatalities: 117
- Survivors: 0

Air India Flight 101 was a scheduled Air India passenger flight from Bombay (present-day Mumbai) to London, via Delhi, Beirut, and Geneva. On the morning of 24 January 1966 at 8:02 CET, on approach to Geneva, the Boeing 707 operating the flight accidentally crashed into Mont Blanc in France, killing all 117 people on board. Among the victims was Homi Jehangir Bhabha, the founder and chairman of the Atomic Energy Commission of India.

The accident occurred just 200 m (660 ft) from where an Air India Lockheed 749 Constellation operating as Air India Flight 245 while on a charter flight had crashed in 1950.

== Accident ==
Air India Flight 101 was a scheduled flight from Bombay to London; and on the day of the accident was operated by a Boeing 707, registration VT-DMN and named Kanchenjunga. The Pilot-In-Command was an 18-year veteran, Captain Joe T. D'Souza. After leaving Bombay, it had made two scheduled stops, at Delhi and Beirut, and was en route to another stop at Geneva. At flight level 190 (19,000 feet; 5,800 m), the crew was instructed to descend for Geneva International Airport after the aircraft had passed Mont Blanc. The pilot, thinking that he had passed Mont Blanc, started to descend and flew into the Mont Blanc massif in France near the Rocher de la Tournette, at an elevation of 4,750 metres (15,584 ft). All 106 passengers and 11 crew were killed.

== Aircraft ==
The Boeing 707-437 VT-DMN had first flown on 5 April 1961 and was delivered new to Air India on 25 May 1961. It had flown a total of 16,188 hours. It was named Kanchenjunga, after the third highest mountain in the world.

== Casualties ==
Among the 106 passengers who died was Dr. Homi Jehangir Bhabha, the founder and chairman of the Atomic Energy Commission of India.

== Investigation ==
At the time, aircrew fixed the position of their aircraft as being above Mont Blanc by taking a cross-bearing from one VHF omnidirectional range (VOR) as they flew along a track from another VOR. However, the accident aircraft departed Beirut with one of its VOR receivers unserviceable.

The investigation concluded:

a) The pilot-in-command calculated his position in relation to Mont Blanc and reported his own estimate of this position to the controller; the radar controller noted a different position of the aircraft and passed a communication to the aircraft which would enable it to change its position.

b) The pilot who, under the mistaken impression that he had passed the ridge leading to the summit and was still at a flight level which afforded sufficient safety clearance over the top of Mont Blanc, continued his descent.

== Recent discoveries ==
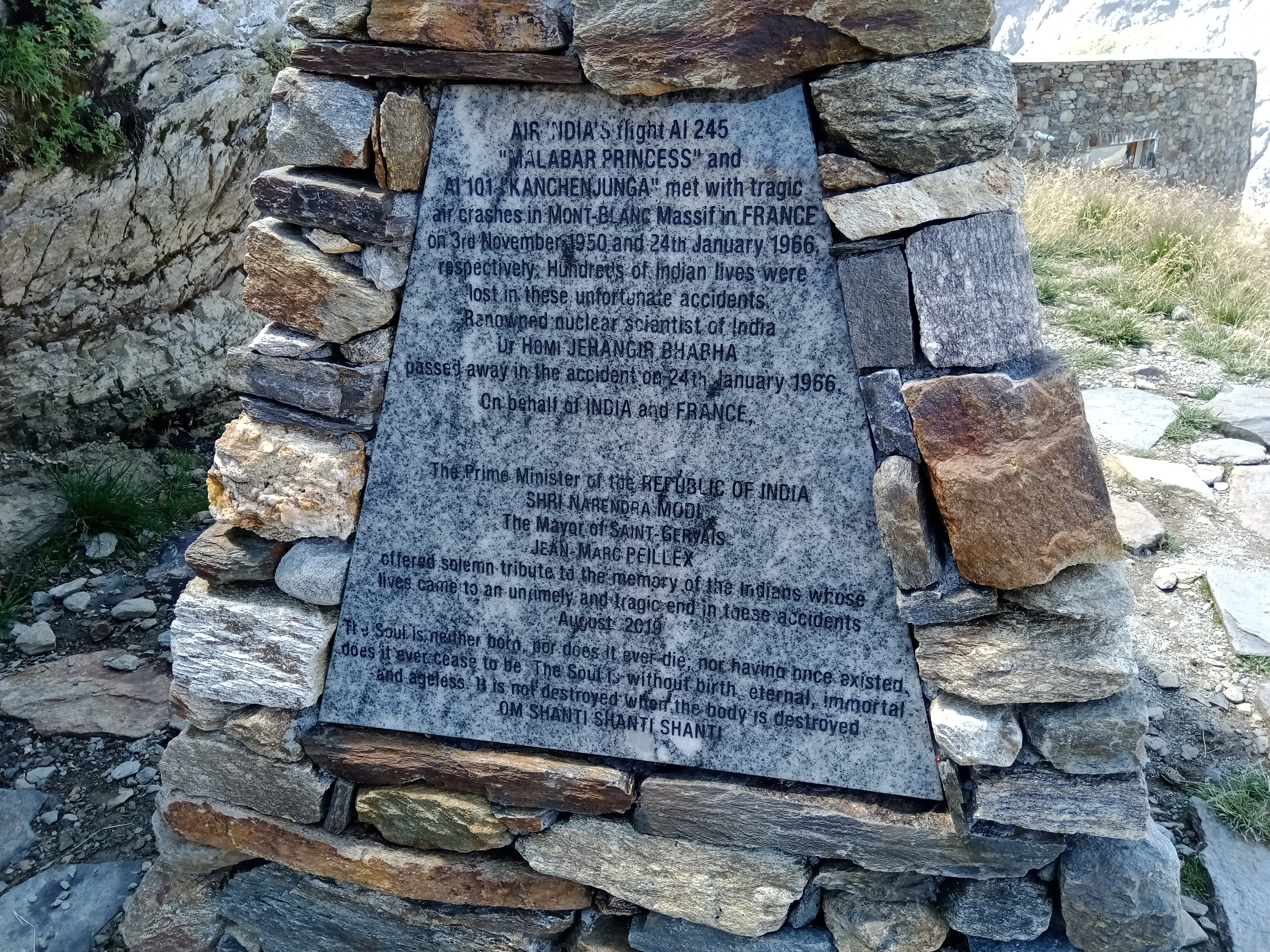
English text of the monument at refuge du Nid d'Aigle in Mont-Blanc Massif

Much of the wreckage of the crashed Boeing still remains at the crash site. In 2008, a climber found some Indian newspapers dated 23 January 1966. An engine from Air India Flight 245, which had crashed at virtually the same spot sixteen years earlier in 1950, was also discovered.

On 21 August 2012, a 9-kilogram (20 lb) jute bag of diplomatic mail, stamped "On Indian Government Service, Diplomatic Mail, Ministry of External Affairs", was recovered by a mountain rescue worker and turned over to local police in Chamonix. An official with the Indian Embassy in Paris took custody of the mailbag, which was found to be a "Type C" diplomatic pouch meant for newspapers, periodicals, and personal letters. Indian diplomatic pouches "Type A" (classified information) and "Type B" (official communications) are still in use today; "Type C" mailbags were made obsolete with the advent of the Internet. The mailbag was found to contain, among other items, still-white and legible copies of The Hindu and The Statesman from mid-January 1966, Air India calendars, and a personal letter to the Indian consul-general in New York, C.J.K. Menon. The bag was flown back to New Delhi on a regular Air India flight, in the charge of C.R. Barooah, the flight purser. His father, R.C. Barooah, was the flight engineer on Air India Flight 101.

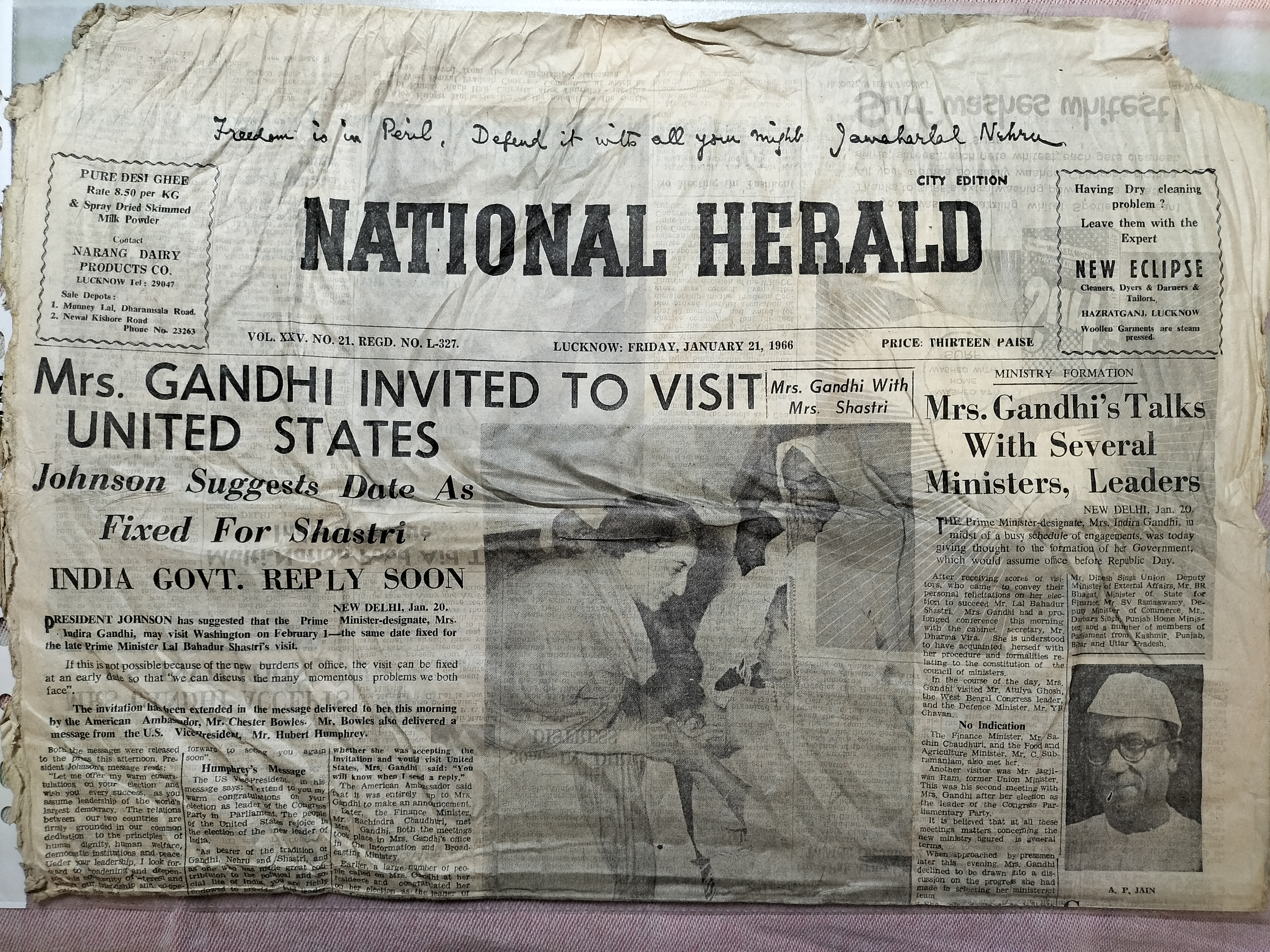
Newspaper discovered on June 4, 2020, on the Bossons Glacier. It was inside a diplomatic suitcase along with other newspapers and official mail.

In September 2013, a French alpinist found a metal box marked with the Air India logo at the site of the plane crash on Mont Blanc containing rubies, sapphires and emeralds, valued at over €245,000, which he handed in to the police to be returned to the rightful owners. As no rightful owners were found, however, in December 2021, the gems were divided up equally between the alpinist and the Chamonix commune: each receiving an amount of stones equivalent to €75,000. As part of her research for her book Crash au Mont-Blanc, which tells the story of the two Air India crashes on the mountain, Françoise Rey found a record of a box of emeralds sent to a man named Issacharov in London, described by Lloyd's. On 11 October 2023, the part belonging to the alpinist was sold at an auction in Chambéry for €25,000.

In 2017, Daniel Roche, a Swiss climber who has searched the Bossons Glacier for wreckage from Air India Flights 245 and 101, found human remains and wreckage including a Boeing 707 aircraft engine. In July 2020, as a result of melting of the glacier, Indian newspapers from 1966 were found in good condition.

On June 4, 2020, a diplomatic bag containing newspapers and official mail was discovered. In 2021, a 'secret' document from the Indian Ministry of External Affairs was also discovered and in 2024, several film reels from the Smithsonian Astrophysical Observatory's artificial satellite tracking program, which had been aboard the plane bound for the United States.

== Bibliography ==
- Pither, Tony (1998). The Boeing 707 720 and C-135. England: Air-Britain (Historians) Ltd. ISBN 0-85130-236-X.
- Rey, Françoise (2013) [1991]. Crash au Mont-Blanc, les fantômes du Malabar Princess et du Kangchenjunga [Crash at Mont Blanc, the ghosts of the Malabar Princess and Kangchenjunga] (in French). Chamonix: Le Petit Montagnard. ISBN 9782954272092.
