= Malabar Princess =

- Theatrical release poster
- Directed by: Gilles Legrand
- Written by: Gilles Legrand; Philippe Vuaillat; Marie-Aude Murail
- Produced by: Frédéric Brillion
- Starring: Jacques Villeret; Michèle Laroque; Claude Brasseur; Clovis Cornillac; Jules Angelo Bigarnet
- Cinematography: Yves Angelo
- Edited by: Judith Rivière Kawa; Andrea Sedlácková
- Music by: René Aubry
- Production companies: Epithète Films; France 3 Cinéma
- Distributed by: Warner Bros. Pictures
- Release date: 3 March 2004
- Running time: 94 minutes
- Country: France
- Language: French
- Budget: $5.8 million
- Box office: $9.1 million

Malabar Princess is a 2004 French film directed by Gilles Legrand. The film is about a young boy called Tom, who is sent to live with his grandfather in the French Alps after his mother disappeared during an excursion with her husband, Pierre, in the French Alps. He becomes friends with Benoît, a boy about his age. While searching for Tom's mother they come across the remains of a plane that had crashed during the 1950s.

== Plot ==
Tom is eight and dyslexic, has been living near Mont Blanc with his maternal grandfather, a tram conductor. He becomes friends with Benoît, and the two search for the remains of the Malabar Princess, an Air India plane that crashed in 1950.

== Production ==
The film was shot on location at Mont Blanc in France. The Malabar Princess disaster actually occurred on 3 November 1950. It was Flight 245, a Lockheed Constellation aircraft of Air India, which had crashed at 4,700 meters above sea level. One of the engines of the wreckage was found on 15 September 1989 on the surface of the Glacier des Bossons, 1,900 m above sea level. A second engine was found on 22 September 2008 at 2,000 m above sea level on the same glacier.

== Cast ==
- Jacques Villeret as Gaspard
- Michèle Laroque as Valentine
- Claude Brasseur as Robert
- Jules Angelo Bigarnet as Tom
- Clovis Cornillac as Pierre
- Urbain Cancelier as Gaston
- Fabienne Chaudat as Odette
- Damien Jouillerot as Benoît
- George Claisse as Guardian of the Sanctuary
- Roland Marchisio as The jeweler
- Patrick Ligardes as Constable Petit
- Franck Adrien as Constable Chopper
