= Mont Blanc =

Highest mountain in the Alps (4,806.m)

- Monte Bianco (Italian)
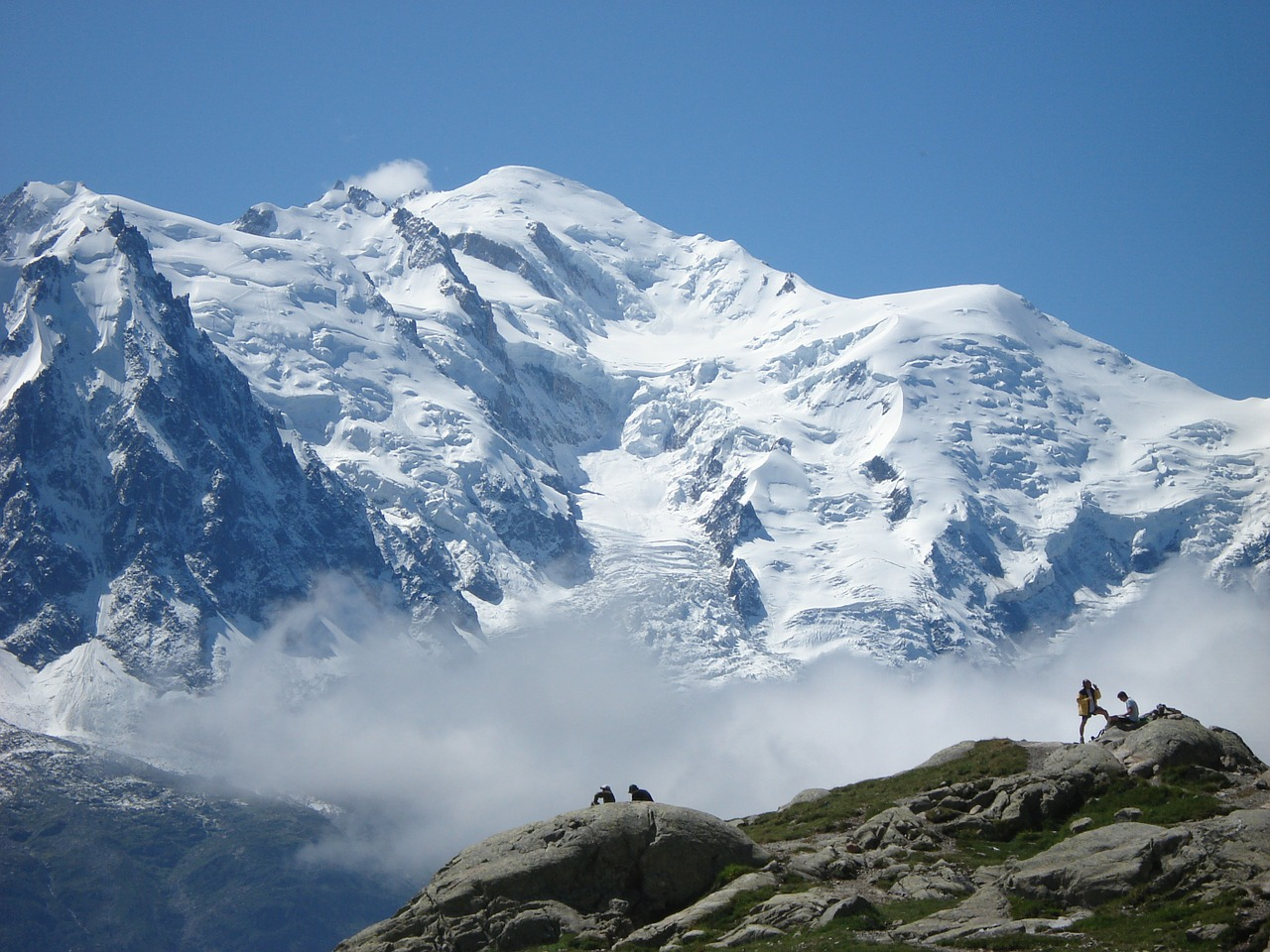
- Monte Bianco, Italy

Highest point
- Elevation: 4,805.59 m (15,766.4 ft)
- Prominence: 4,696 m ↓ by Lake Kubenskoye; Ranked 11th
- Parent peak: Mount Elbrus (Note: Although Mount Elbrus is normally considered the tallest mountain in continental Europe, the latter continent is part of the Eurasian land mass, which culminates at Mount Everest (highest col between Mont Blanc and Mount Everest: 113 m Archived 21 February 2016 at the Wayback Machine; highest col between Mount Elbrus and Mount Everest: 901 m Archived 21 February 2016 at the Wayback Machine).)
- Isolation: 2,812 km → Kukurtlu Dome
- Listing: Country high point Ultra; Seven Summits; World's most isolated peaks 13th
- Coordinates: 45°49′58″N 06°51′54″E

Geography
- Location within Alps Location within France Location within Italy Location within Europe
- Location: Auvergne-Rhône-Alpes, France; Aosta Valley, Italy
- Countries: France; Italy
- Parent range: Graian Alps

Climbing
- First ascent: 8 August 1786 by: Jacques Balmat; Michel-Gabriel Paccard

Mont Blanc (UK: /ˌmɒ̃ˈblɒ̃(k)/; US: /ˌmɒn(t)ˈblɑːŋk/) (Note: French: Mont Blanc [mɔ̃ blɑ̃]; Italian: Monte Bianco [ˈmonte ˈbjaŋko]; Arpitan: Mont Blanc; all three meaning 'white mountain'.) is a mountain in the Alps, rising 4,807.3 m (15,771.9 ft) above sea level, located right at the Franco-Italian border. It is the highest mountain in Europe outside the Caucasus Mountains, the second-most prominent mountain in Europe (after Mount Elbrus in Russia), and the 11th most prominent mountain in the world.

The mountain gives its name to its range, the Mont Blanc massif, which straddles parts of France, Italy, and Switzerland. Mont Blanc's summit lies on the watershed line between the valleys of Ferret and Veny in Italy, and the valleys of Montjoie, and Arve in France. Ownership of the summit area has long been disputed between France and Italy.

The Mont Blanc massif is popular for outdoor activities such as hiking, climbing, and trail running and winter sports such as skiing and snowboarding. The most popular climbing route to the summit of Mont Blanc is the Goûter Route, which typically takes two days.

The three towns and their communes which surround Mont Blanc are Courmayeur in Aosta Valley, Italy; and Saint-Gervais-les-Bains and Chamonix in Haute-Savoie, France. The latter town was the site of the first Winter Olympics. A cable car ascends and crosses the mountain range from Courmayeur to Chamonix through the Col du Géant. The 11.6 km (7 1/4 mi) Mont Blanc Tunnel, constructed between 1957 and 1965, runs beneath the mountain and is a major transalpine transport route.

Mont Blanc seen from Chamonix summer 2026

== Geology ==
Mont Blanc and adjacent mountains in the massif are predominantly formed from a large intrusion of granite (termed a batholith) which was forced up through a basement layer of gneiss and mica schists during the Variscan mountain-forming event of the late Palaeozoic period. The summit of Mont Blanc is located at the point of contact of these two rock types. To the southwest, the granite contact is of a more intrusive nature, whereas to the northeast it changes to being more tectonic. The granites are mostly very-coarse grained, ranging in type from microgranites to porphyroid granites.

The massif is tilted in a north-westerly direction and was cut by near-vertical recurrent faults lying in a north–south direction during the Variscan orogeny. Further faulting with shear zones subsequently occurred during the later Alpine orogeny. Repeated tectonic phases have caused breakup of the rock in multiple directions and in overlapping planes. Finally, past and current glaciation caused significant sculpting of the landscape into its present-day form.

The first systematic account of the minerals of the Mont Blanc area was published in 1873 by Venance Payot. His list, entitled "Statistique minéralogique des environs du Mt-Blanc", catalogued 90 mineral types although it also included those present only as very small components of rocks. If these are excluded, it is known today that at least 68 separate mineral species occur across the wider range of the Mont Blanc massif.

== Climate ==
Located on the watershed between the Rhône and the Po, the massif of Mont Blanc is also situated between the two different climatic regions of the northern and western Alps and that of the southern Alps. Climatic conditions on the Mer de Glace are similar to those found on the northern side of the Swiss Alps.

The climate is cold and temperate (Köppen climate classification Cfb), and is greatly influenced by altitude. Being the highest part of the Alps, Mont Blanc and surrounding mountains can create their own weather patterns. Temperatures drop as the mountains gain in height, and the summit of Mont Blanc is a permanent ice cap, with temperatures around −20 °C (−4 °F). The summit is also prone to strong winds and sudden weather changes. Because of its great overall height, a considerable proportion is permanently glaciated or snow-covered and is exposed to extremely cold conditions.

There is, however, significant variation in precipitation with altitude. For example, the village of Chamonix below Mont Blanc is at an elevation of approximately 1,030 m (3,380 ft). It receives around 1,020 mm (40 in) of annual precipitation, whilst the Col du Midi, which is at 3,500 m (11,500 ft) above sea level, receives significantly more, totalling 3,100 mm (122 in). However, at an even higher altitude (near the summit of Mont Blanc), precipitation is considerably less, with only around 1,100 mm (43 in) recorded, despite the latter measurements being taken at the height of 4,300 m (14,100 ft).

== History ==
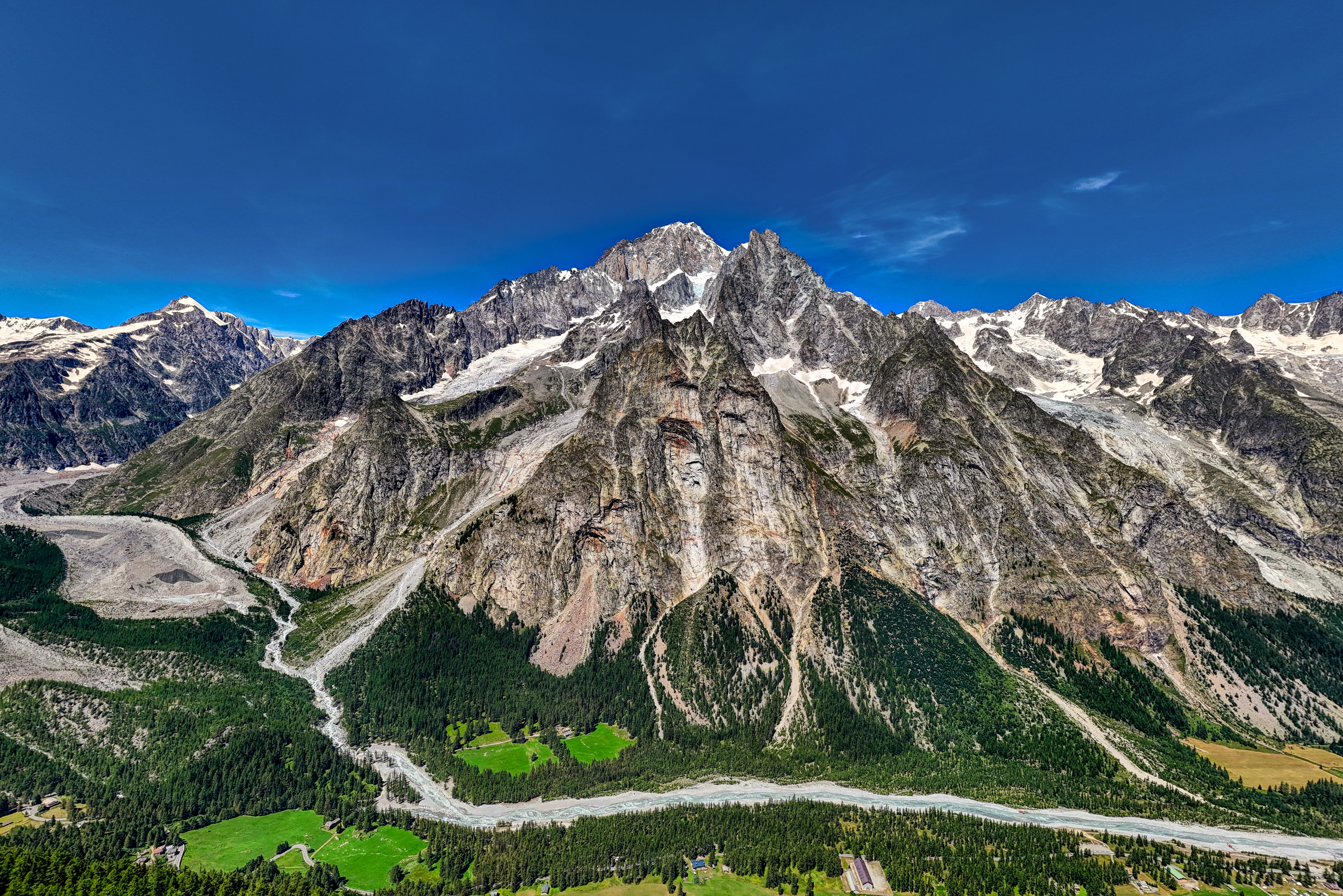
Mont Blanc as seen from the Chécrouit Lake, Italy

The Mont Blanc was the highest mountain of the Frankish Empire under Charlemagne and the highest mountain of the Holy Roman Empire until 1792. (Note: Following the secession of the Duchy of Savoy, the Ortler became the highest mountain of the Holy Roman Empire.)

Pierre Martel's 1744 map and sketch of the Chamonix valley contains what is considered the first printed appearance of the name "Mont Blanc".

In 1760, Swiss naturalist Horace-Bénédict de Saussure began to go to Chamonix to observe Mont Blanc. He tried to summit it with the Courmayeur mountain guide Jean-Laurent Jordaney, a native of Pré-Saint-Didier, who accompanied De Saussure since 1774 on the Miage Glacier and Mont Crammont.

The first recorded ascent of Mont Blanc (at the time neither within Italy nor France) was on 8 August 1786 by Jacques Balmat and the doctor Michel-Gabriel Paccard. This climb, initiated by Horace-Bénédict de Saussure, who rewarded the successful ascent, traditionally marks the start of modern mountaineering. The first woman to reach the summit was Marie Paradis in 1808.

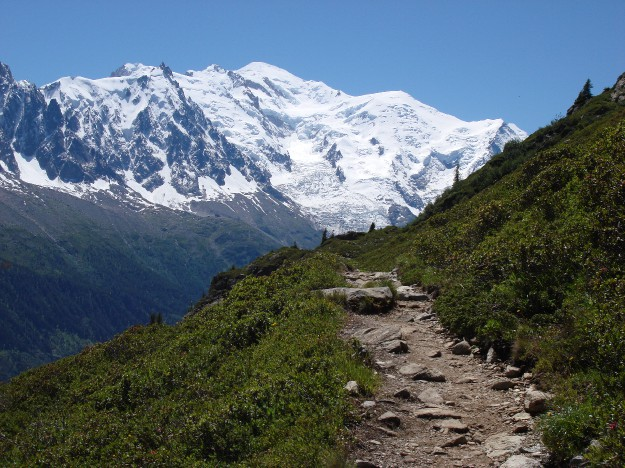
Mont Blanc from the TMB

=== Ownership of the summit ===
At the scale of the Mont Blanc massif, the border between Italy and France passes along most of the main Alpine watershed, from the Aiguille des Glaciers to Mont Dolent, where it reaches the border with Switzerland. However, its precise location near the summits of Mont Blanc and nearby Dôme du Goûter is disputed. Italian officials claim the border follows the watershed, splitting both summits between Italy and France. In contrast, French officials claim the border avoids the two summits, placing them entirely with France. The size of these two (distinct) disputed areas is approximately 65 hectares (160 acres) on Mont Blanc and ten hectares (25 acres) on Dôme du Goûter.

In 1723, the Duke of Savoy, Victor Amadeus II, acquired the Kingdom of Sardinia. The resulting state of Sardinia was to become preeminent in the Italian unification.

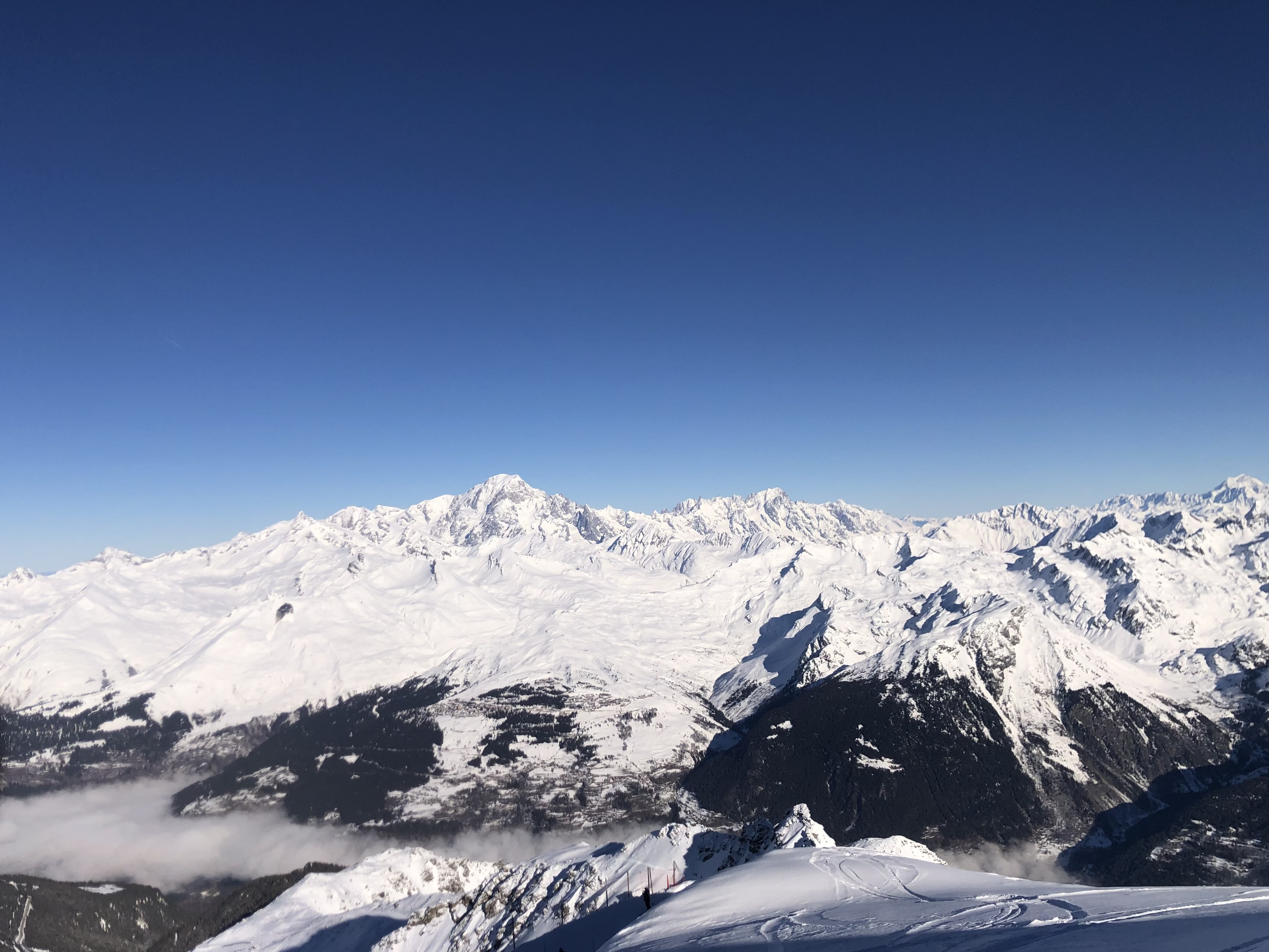
View of the southern side of Mont Blanc (big summit on the left) from Aiguille Rouge

Citing the Treaty of Paris (1796), France claims that the historical border of Savoy and Piedmont diverged from the watershed line, fully encompassing the summit of Mont Blanc within Savoy and consequently, within French territory.

After the Napoleonic Wars, the Congress of Vienna restored the King of Sardinia in Savoy, Nice, and Piedmont, his traditional territories, overruling the 1796 Treaty of Paris. Forty-five years later, after the Second Italian War of Independence, it was replaced by a new legal act. This act was signed in Turin on 24 March 1860 by Napoleon III and Victor Emmanuel II of Savoy, and deals with the annexation of Savoy (following the French neutrality for the plebiscites held in Tuscany, Modena, Parma and Romagna to join the Kingdom of Sardinia, against the Pope's will). A demarcation agreement, signed on 7 March 1861, defined the new border. With the formation of Italy, for the first time, Mont Blanc was located on the border of France and Italy, along the old border between the department of Savoy and that of Piedmont, formerly belonging to the Savoyard state.

The 1860 act is still legally valid for both the French and Italian governments. Italy claims that the border was moved by France in 1865, when surveys carried out by a cartographer of the French army, Captain J. J. Mieulet, incorporated the summit into French territory, making the state border deviate from the watershed line, and giving rise to the differences with the maps published in Italy in the same period.

Modern Swiss mapping, published by the Federal Office of Topography, plots a region of disputed territory (statut de territoire contesté) around the summits of both Mont Blanc and the Dôme du Goûter. One of its interpretations of the French-Italian border places both summits straddling a line running directly along the geographic ridgeline (watershed) between France and Italy, thus sharing their summits equally between both states. However, a second interpretation places both summits, as well as that of Mont Blanc de Courmayeur (although much less clearly in the latter case), solely within France.

NATO maps take data from the Italian national mapping agency, the Istituto Geografico Militare, which is based upon past treaties in force.

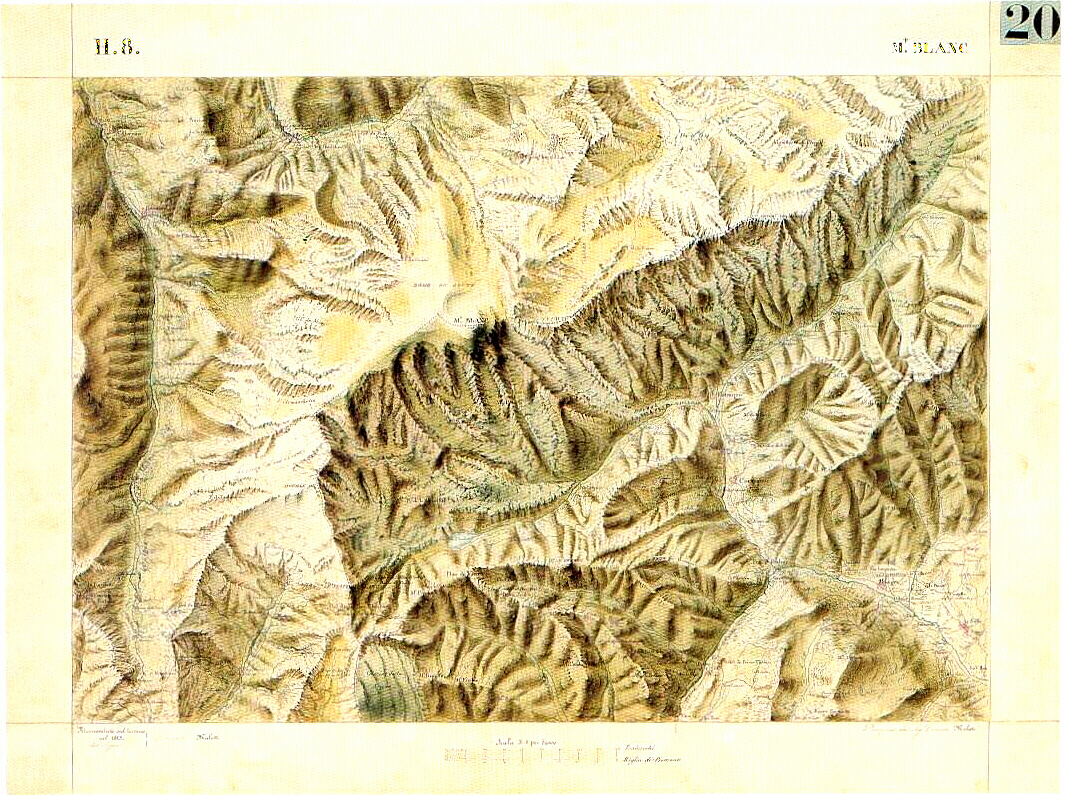
1832 Map of the Kingdom of Sardinia showing an administrative border passing through the summit of Mont Blanc. This was the same map annexed to the 1860 treaty to determine the current border between France and Italy.

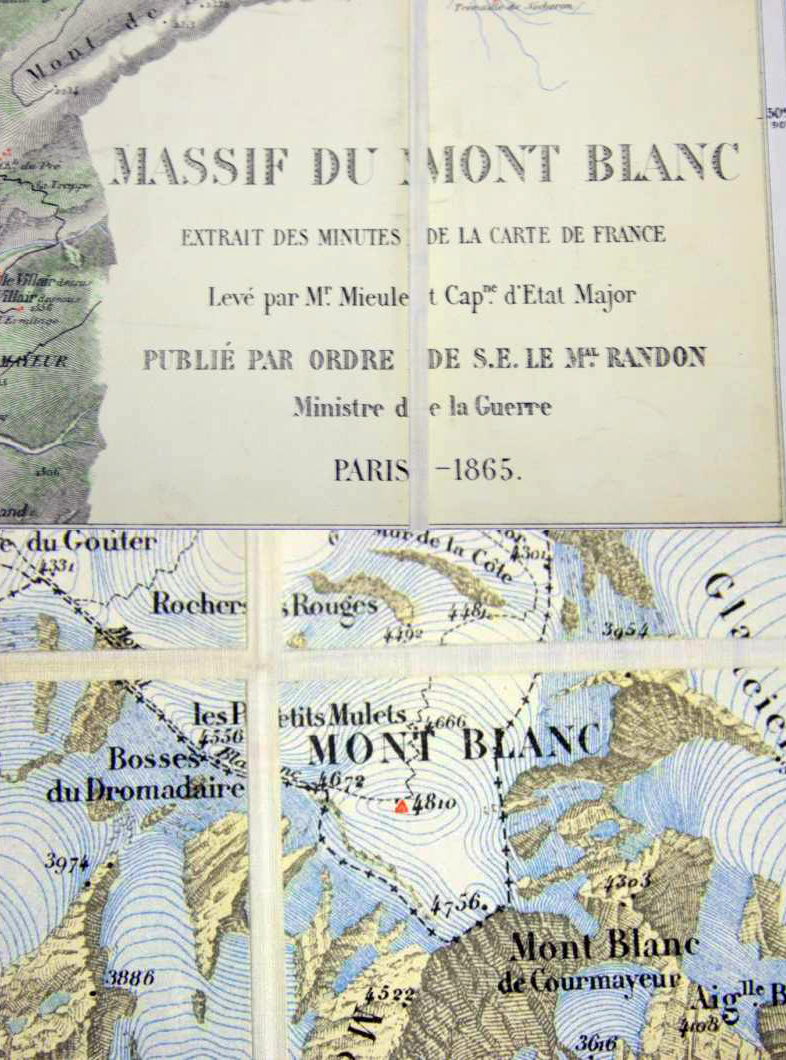
Captain Mieulet map of 1865 placing the international border south of the watershed

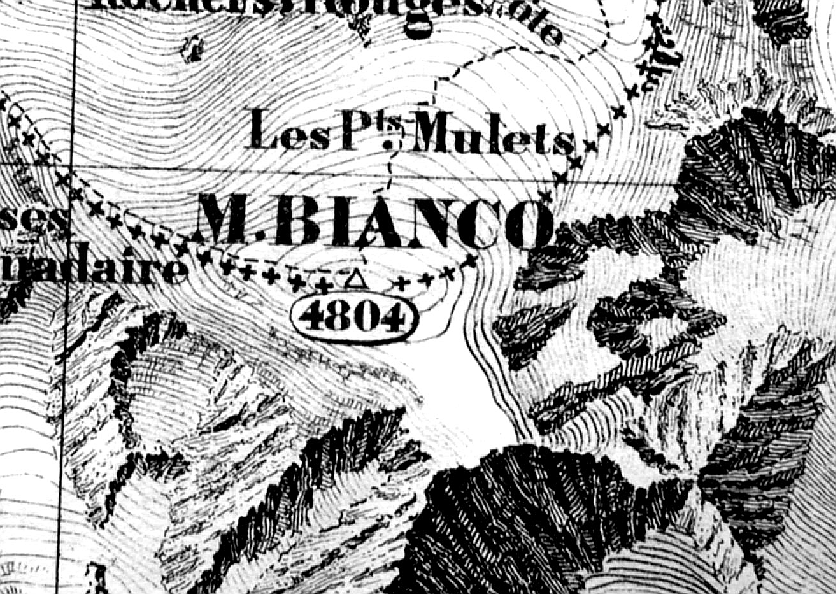
A Sardinian Atlas map of 1869 showing the international border on the watershed

1:50'000 Swiss National Map, with both disputed areas marked

=== Vallot ===
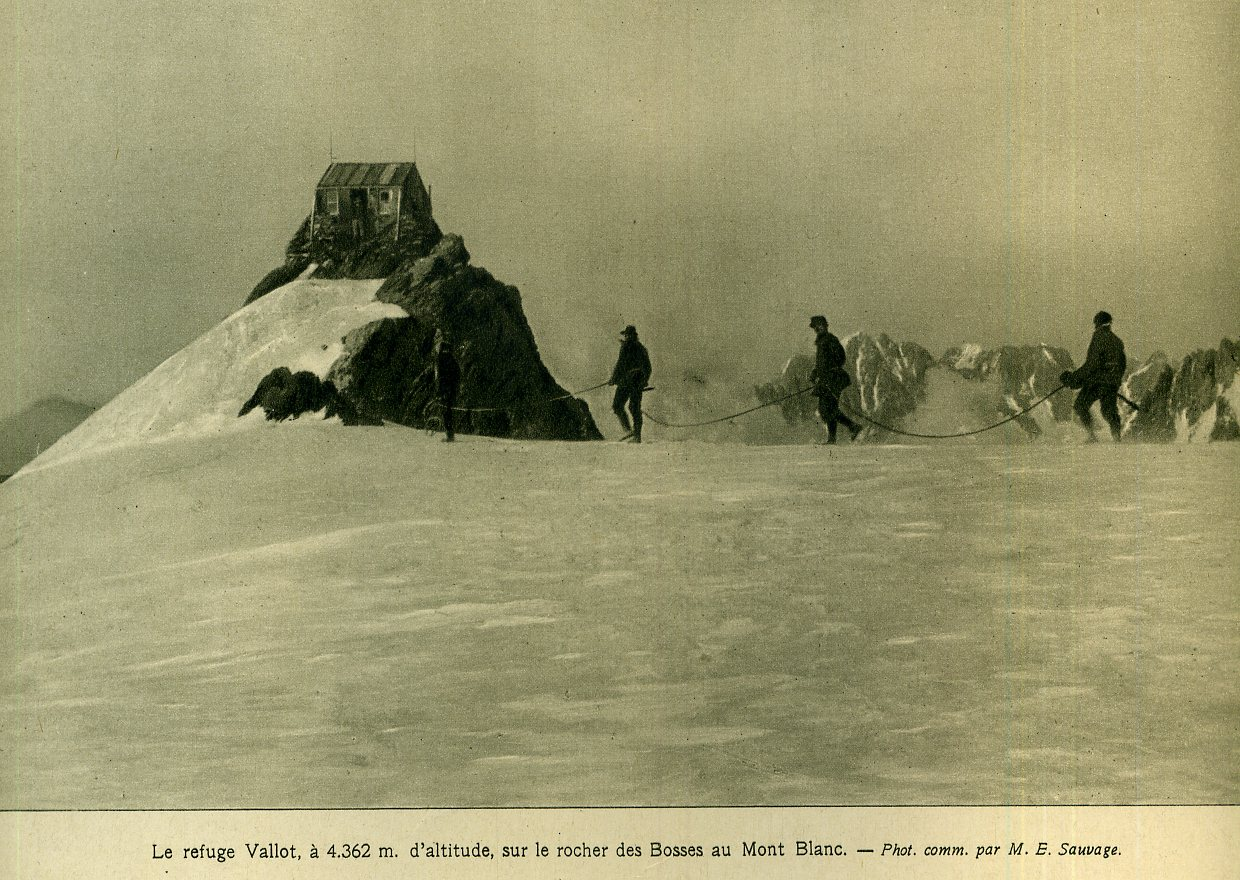
The original Vallot refuge (now rebuilt) near Mont Blanc summit, at an altitude of 4,362 m

=== Janssen observatory ===
In 1890, Pierre Janssen, an astronomer and the director of the Meudon astrophysical observatory, considered the construction of an observatory at the summit of Mont Blanc. Gustave Eiffel agreed to take on the project, provided he could build on a rock foundation if found at a depth of less than twelve metres (39 ft) below the ice. In 1891, the Swiss surveyor Imfeld dug two 23-metre (75 ft) horizontal tunnels twelve metres (39 ft) below the ice summit but found nothing solid. Consequently, the Eiffel project was abandoned.

Despite this, the observatory was built in 1893. During the cold wave of January 1893, a temperature of −43 °C (−45 °F) was recorded on Mont Blanc, being the lowest ever recorded there.

Levers attached to the ice supported the observatory. This worked to some extent until 1906, when the building started leaning heavily. The movement of the levers corrected the lean slightly, but three years later (two years after Janssen's death), a crevasse started opening under the observatory. It was abandoned. Eventually the building fell, and only the tower could be saved in extremis.

=== Air crashes ===
The mountain was the scene of two fatal air crashes; Air India Flight 245 in 1950 and Air India Flight 101 in 1966. Both planes were approaching Geneva Airport and the pilots miscalculated their descent; 48 and 117 people, respectively, died. The passengers on flight 101 included nuclear scientist Homi J. Bhabha, known as the "father" of India's nuclear programme.

=== Tunnel ===
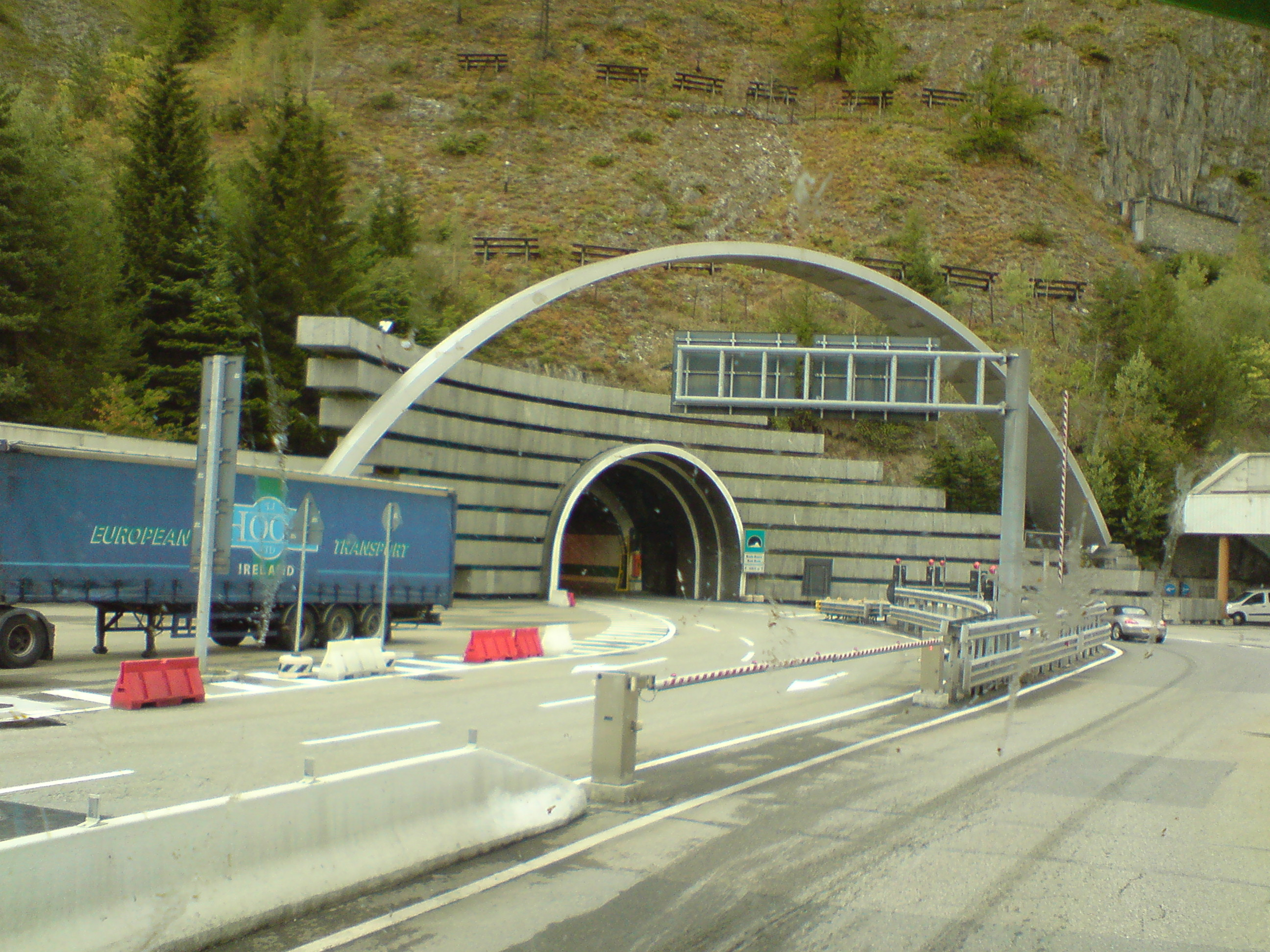
Entrance of the Mont Blanc Tunnel in Italy

In 1946, a drilling project was initiated to carve a tunnel through the mountain. The Mont Blanc tunnel would connect Chamonix, France, and Courmayeur, Italy, and become one of the major transalpine transport routes between the two countries. In 1965, the tunnel opened to vehicle traffic with a length of 11,611 metres (7.215 mi).

==== 1999 disaster ====
In 1999, a transport truck caught fire in the tunnel beneath the mountain. In total, 39 people were killed when the fire raged out of control. The tunnel was renovated in the aftermath to increase driver safety. Renovations include computerised detection equipment, extra security bays, a parallel escape shaft, and a fire station in the middle of the tunnel. The escape shafts also have clean air flowing through them via vents. Any people in the security bays now have live video contact to communicate with the control centre. A remote site for cargo safety inspection was created on each side: Aosta in Italy and Passy-Le Fayet in France. Here all trucks are inspected before entering the tunnel. These remote sites are also used as staging areas to control commercial traffic during peak hours. The renovated tunnel reopened three years after the disaster.

== Elevation ==
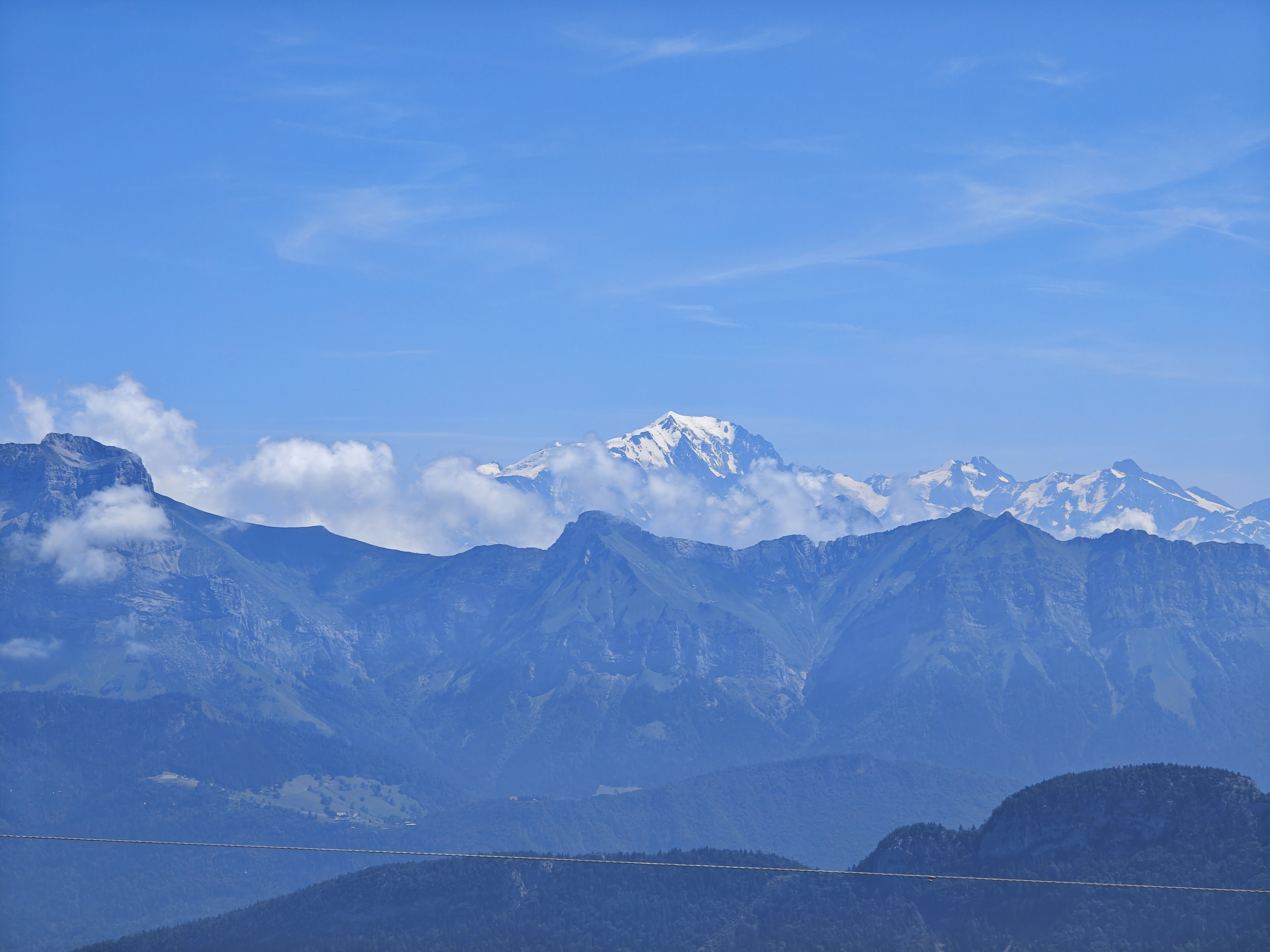
View of Mont Blanc from France

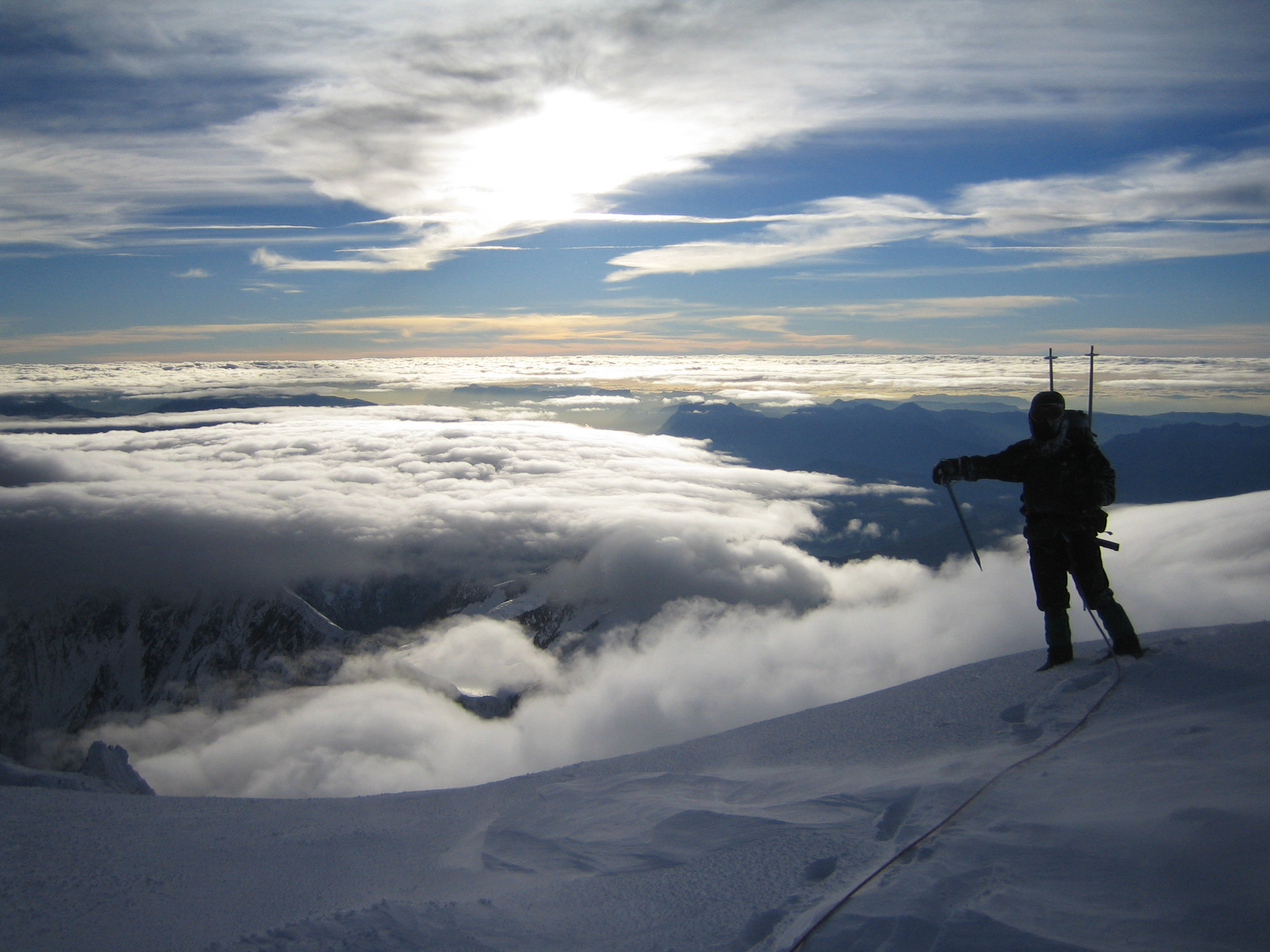
Mont Blanc summit

The summit of Mont Blanc is a thick, perennial ice-and-snow dome whose thickness varies. Therefore, no exact and permanent summit elevation can be determined, though accurate measurements have been made on specific dates. Its official elevation was 4,807 m (15,771 ft) for a long time. In 2002, the IGN and expert surveyors, with the aid of GPS technology, measured it to be 4,807.40 m (15,772 ft 4 in).

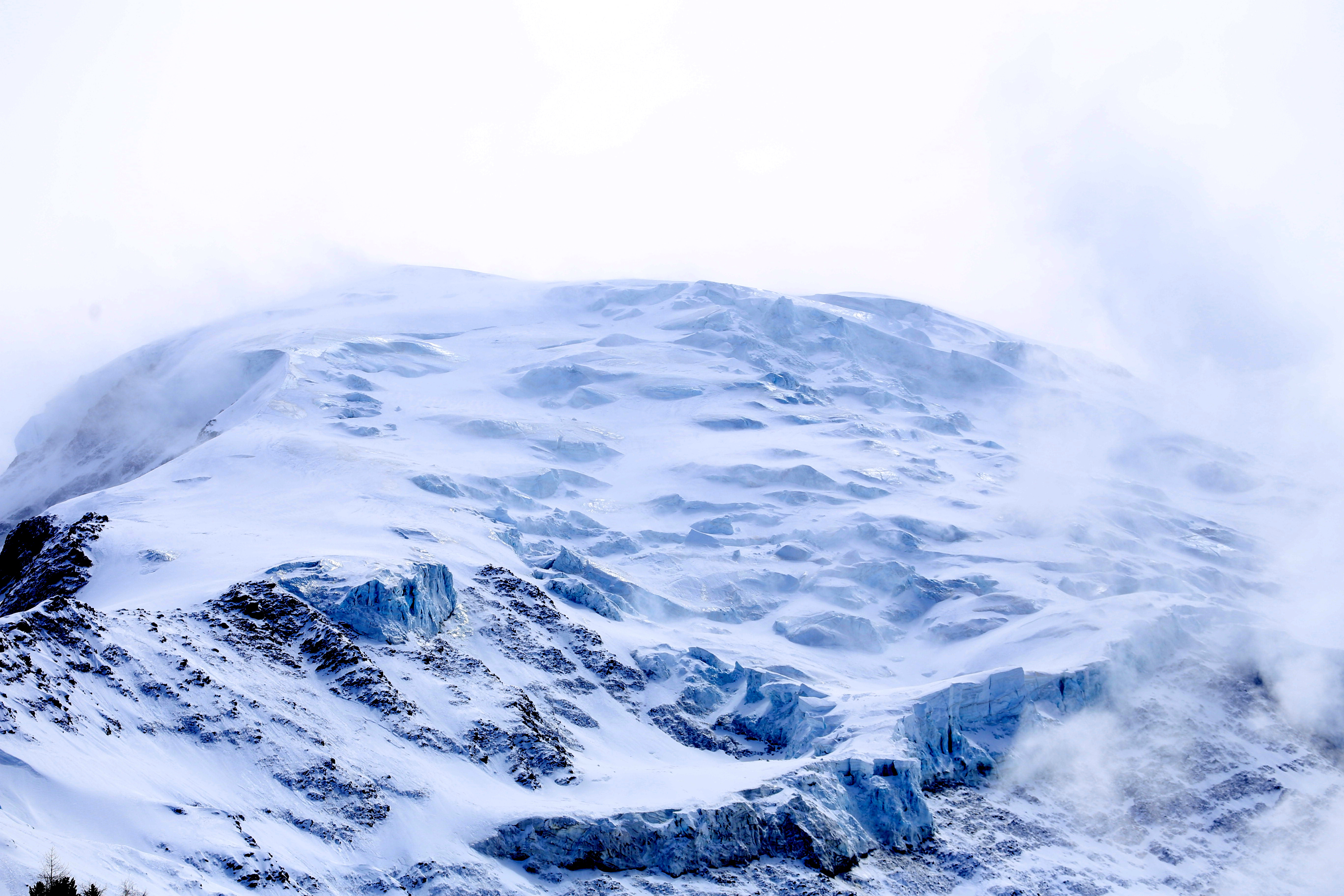
View from the Glacier des Bossons, May 2021

After the 2003 heatwave in Europe, a team of scientists remeasured the height on 6 and 7 September. The team was made up of the glaciologist Luc Moreau, two surveyors from the GPS Company, three people from the IGN, seven expert surveyors, four mountain guides from Chamonix and Saint-Gervais and four students from various institutes in France. This team noted that the elevation was 4,808.45 m (15,775 ft 9 in), and the peak had shifted to a point 75 cm (30 in) away from where it had been in 2002.

After these results were published, more than 500 points were measured to assess the effects of climate change and the mountain's height fluctuations at different points. Since then, the mountain's elevation has been measured every two years.

The summit was measured again in 2005, and the results were published on 16 December 2005. The height was found to be 4,808.75 m (15,776 ft 9 in), 30 cm (12 in) more than the previously recorded height. The rock summit was found to be at 4,792 m (15,722 ft), some 40 m (130 ft) west of the ice-covered summit.

In 2007, the summit was measured at 4,807.9 m (15,774 ft) and in 2009 at 4,807.45 m (15,772 ft). In 2013, the summit was measured at 4,810.02 m (15,781 ft) and in 2015 at 4,808.73 m (15,777 ft). In 2021 the altidude was 4,807.81 m (15,773.7 ft). In 2023 was the lower record of 4,805.59 m (15,776.4 ft) after 18 months drought on the Western Alps. In 2025 the elevation increased to 4807.3 m (15,772 ft).

From the summit of Mont Blanc on a clear day, the Jura, the Vosges, the Black Forest, and the Massif Central mountain ranges can be seen, as well as the principal summits of the Alps.

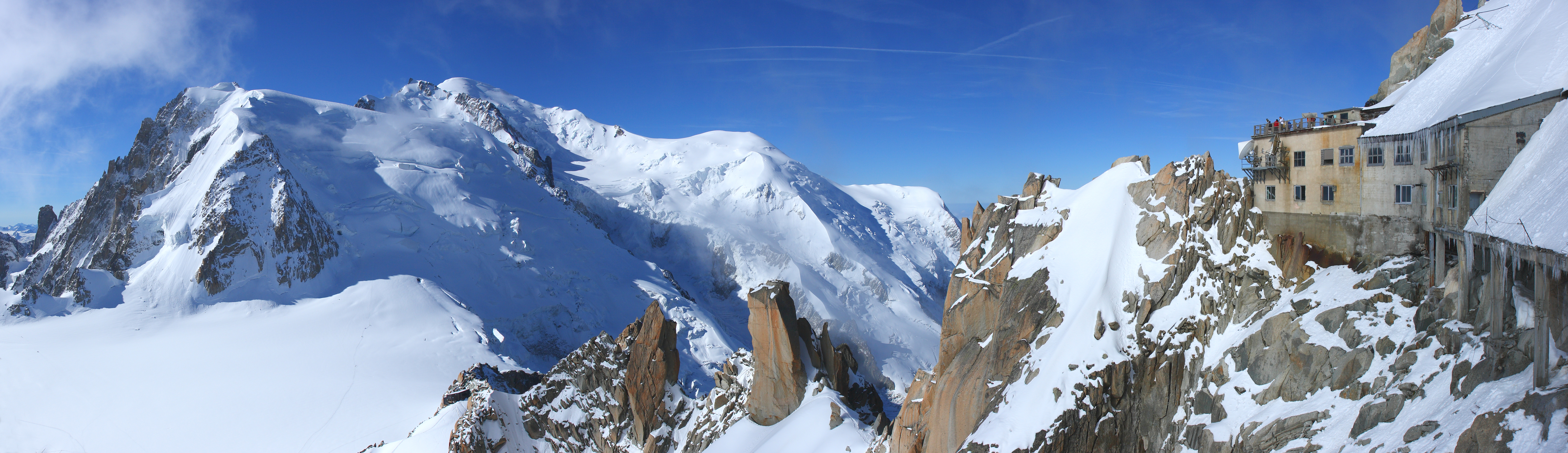
Mont Blanc seen from the Rébuffat platform on Aiguille du Midi

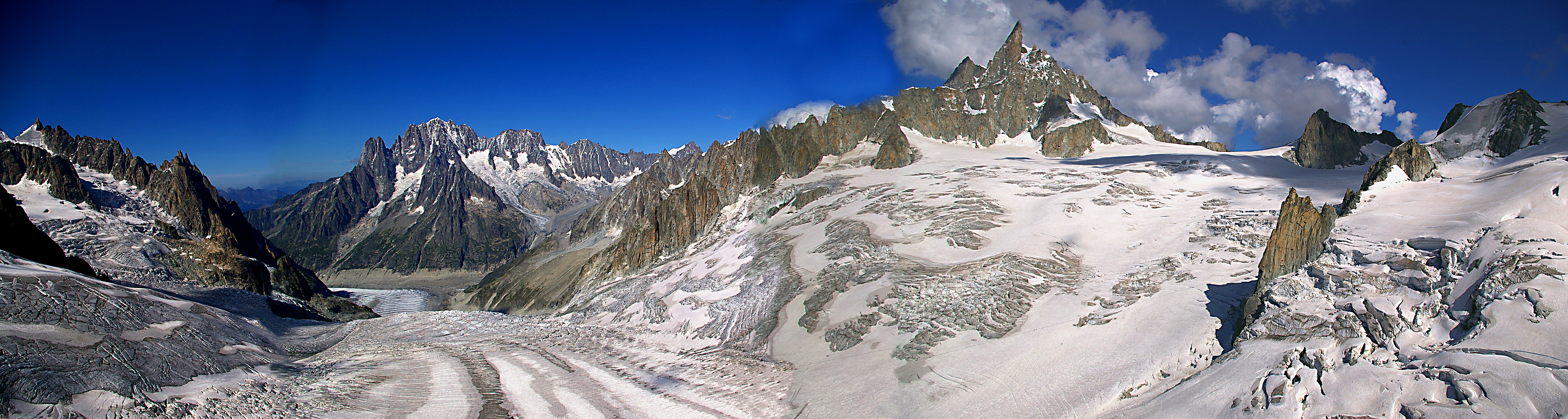
View from Vallee Blanche of Glacier du Géant and Dent du Géant, looking down Glacier du Tacul towards the Mer de Glace, with Aiguille du Moine, les Drus and Aiguille Verte in centre-left

== Climbing routes ==
Mont Blanc 3D

Mont Blanc 3D with peak names, alpine huts and paths.

Several classic climbing routes lead to the summit of Mont Blanc:

- The most popular route is the Goûter Route, also known as the Voie Des Cristalliers or the Voie Royale. Starting from Saint-Gervais-les-Bains, the Tramway du Mont-Blanc (TMB) is taken to get to the Gare du Nid d'Aigle. The ascent begins in the direction of the Refuge de Tête Rousse, crossing the Grand Couloir or Goûter Corridor, considered dangerous because of frequent rockfalls, leading to the Goûter Hut for night shelter. The next day the route leads to the Dôme du Goûter, past the emergency Vallot cabin and l'Arête des Bosses.
- La Voie des 3 Monts is also known as La Traversée. Starting from Chamonix, the Téléphérique de l'Aiguille du Midi is taken towards the Col du Midi. The Cosmiques Hut is used to spend the night. The next day the ascent continues over Mont Blanc du Tacul and Mont Maudit.
- The historic itinerary via the Grands Mulets Hut, or the old normal route on the French side, which is most frequently traversed in winter by ski, or in summer to descend to Chamonix.
- The normal Italian itinerary is called La route des Aiguilles Grises. After crossing the Miage Glacier, climbers spend the night at the Gonella refuge. The next day, one proceeds through the Col des Aiguilles Grises and the Dôme du Goûter, concluding at L'arête des Bosses (Bosses ridge).
- The Miage – Bionnassay – Mont Blanc crossing is usually done in three days. It has been described as a truly magical expedition of ice and snow arêtes at great altitude. The route begins from Contamines-Montjoie, with the night spent in the Conscrits Hut. The following day, the Dômes de Miages is crossed and the night is spent at the Durier cabin. The third day proceeds over l'Aiguille de Bionnassay and the Dôme du Goûter, finally reaching the summit of Mont Blanc via the Bosses ridge.

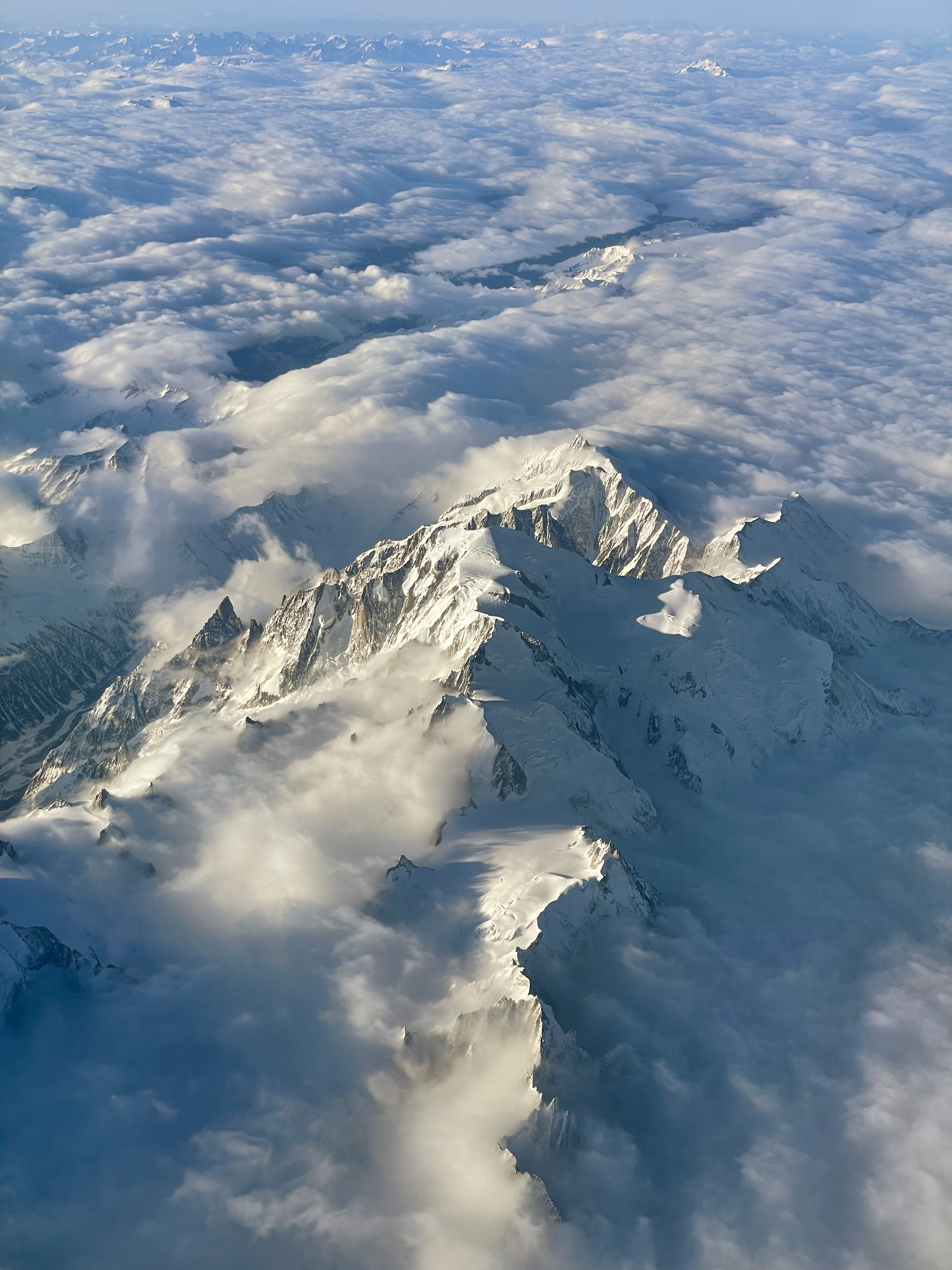
Aerial view of Mont Blanc from 9,000 meters above sea level

Nowadays, the summit is ascended by an average of 20,000 mountaineer tourists each year. It could be considered a technically easy yet arduous ascent for someone well-trained and acclimatised to the altitude. From l'Aiguille du Midi (where the cable car stops), Mont Blanc seems quite close, being 1,000 m (3,300 ft) higher. But while the peak looks deceptively close, the La Voie des 3 Monts route (known to be more technical and challenging than other more commonly used routes) requires more ascent over two other 4,000 m (13,000 ft) mountains, Mont Blanc du Tacul and Mont Maudit, before the final 1,000 m (3,300 ft) push to the summit is undertaken.

Each year climbing deaths occur on Mont Blanc. On the busiest weekends, normally around August, the local rescue service performs an average of 12 missions, mostly directed to aid people in trouble on one of the normal routes of the mountain. Some routes require knowledge of high-altitude mountaineering and a guide (or at least an experienced mountaineer), and all require proper equipment. All routes are long and arduous, involving delicate passages and the hazard of rockfall or avalanche. Climbers may also suffer altitude sickness, occasionally life-threatening, particularly if they are not properly acclimatised.

=== Fatalities ===
A 1994 estimate suggests there had been 6,000 to 8,000 alpinist fatalities in total, more than on any other mountain. These numbers exclude the fatalities of Air India Flight 245 and Air India Flight 101, two planes that crashed into Mont Blanc. Despite unsubstantiated claims recurring in media that "some estimates put the fatality rate at an average of 100 hikers a year", actual reported annual numbers at least since the 1990s are between 10 and 20: in 2017, fourteen people died out of 20,000 summit attempts, and two remained missing; with 15 in 2018 as of August.

A French study on the especially risky "Goûter couloir, on the normal route on Mont Blanc" and necessary rescue operations found that, between 1990 and 2011, there were 74 deaths "between the Tête Rousse refuge (3,187 m) and the Goûter refuge (3,830 m)". There were 17 more in 2012–15, none in 2016, and 11 in 2017.

== Refuges ==
- Refuge Vallot, 4362 m
- Bivouac Giuseppe Lampugnani, 3860 m
- Bivouac Marco Crippa, 3840 m
- Refuge Goûter, 3817 m
- Bivouac Corrado Alberico – Luigi Borgna, 3684 m
- Refuge Cosmiques, 3613 m
- Refuge Tête Rousse, 3167 m
- Refuge Francesco Gonella, 3071 m
- Refuge Grands Mulets, 3050 m

=== Impacts of climate change ===
The recent temperature rises and heatwaves, such as those of the summers of 2015 and 2018, have significantly impacted many climbing routes across the Alps, including those on Mont Blanc. For example, in 2015, the Grand Mulets route, previously popular in the 20th century, was blocked by virtually impenetrable crevasse fields, and the Goûter Hut was closed by municipal decree for some days because of a very high rockfall danger, with some stranded climbers evacuated by helicopter.

In 2016 a crevasse opened at high altitude, also indicating previously unobserved glacial movements. The new crevasse forms an obstacle to be scaled by climbing parties on the final part of the itinerary to the top shared by the popular Goûter Route and the Grand Mulets Route.

== Exploits and incidents ==
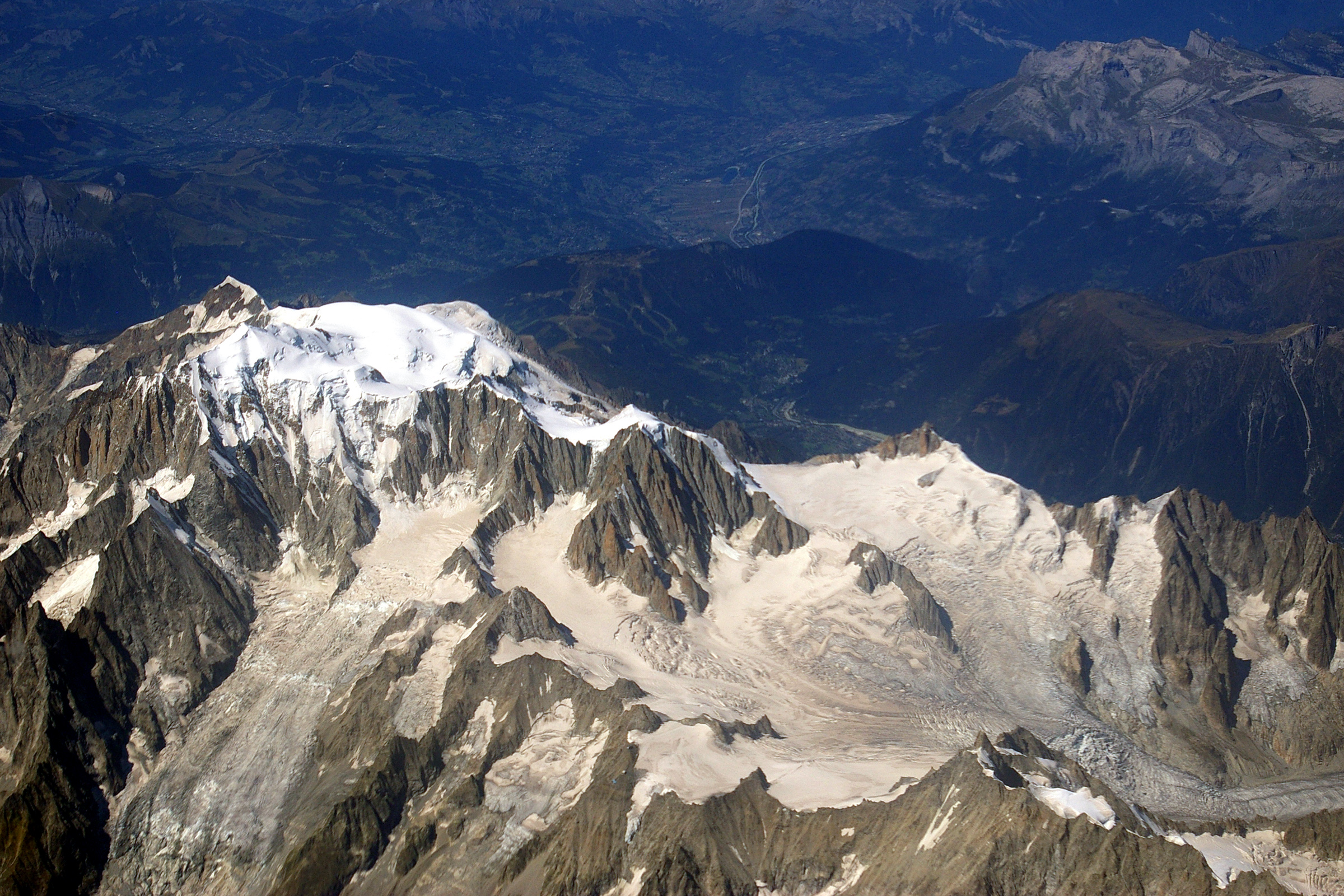
Aerial view of the south-eastern side of Mont Blanc, taken on a commercial flight

"The First Ascent of Mont Blanc"
by T. Louis Oxley 1881
Read by Phil Schempfn for LibriVox
Audio 00:39:46 (full text)

- 1786: The first ascent, by Michel-Gabriel Paccard and Jacques Balmat; see Exploration of the High Alps.
- 1787: The fourth ascent, by Englishman Mark Beaufoy, with at least six guides and a servant.
- July 1808: The first ascent by a woman, Maria Paradis, with Balmat as her guide.
- July 1838: The second ascent by a woman, Henriette d'Angeville.
- 1890: Giovanni Bonin, Luigi Grasselli and Fr. Achille Ratti (later Pope Pius XI) discovered the normal Italian route (West Face Direct) on descent.
- 1929: Dorothy Thompson makes first ascent of the Brouillard Ridge by a woman.
- 1950: Air India Flight 245 crashes into Mont Blanc.
- 1960: The airplane pilot Henri Giraud landed on the summit, which is only 30 m (98 ft) long.
- 1966: Air India Flight 101 crashes into Mont Blanc.
- 1990: The Swiss Pierre-André Gobet, leaving from Chamonix, completed the ascent and descent in 5 hours, 10 minutes and 14 seconds.
- 30 May 2003: Stéphane Brosse and Pierre Gignoux tried to beat the record by ski-walking. They went up in 4 hours and 7 minutes and came back down in 1 hour and 8 minutes. In total, they did the ascent and descent in 5 hours and 15 minutes.
- 13 August 2003: Seven French paraglider pilots landed on the summit. They reached a peak altitude of 5,200 m (17,100 ft), thanks to the hot weather conditions, which provided strong hot air currents. Five had left from Planpraz, one from Rochebrune at Megève and the last one from Samoëns.
- 8 June 2007: Danish artist Marco Evaristti draped the peak of Mont Blanc with red fabric, along with a 20 ft (6.1 m) pole with a flag reading "Pink State". He had been arrested and detained earlier on 6 June for attempting to paint a pass leading up to the summit red. He aimed to raise awareness of environmental degradation.
- 13 September 2007: A group of 20 people set up a hot tub at the summit.
- 19 August 2012: Fifty paraglider pilots landed on the summit, beating the previous record of seven top landing pilots, set in 2003. This included the second-ever tandem landing on the summit.
- 11 July 2013: Kilian Jornet beat the fastest overall time for ascent and descent with 4 hours, 57 minutes and 40 seconds.
- 21 June 2018: Emelie Forsberg set a women's fastest known time up and down from Chamonix with 7 hours 53 minutes and 12 seconds, improving her previous record of 8 hours 10 minutes from 2013.
- 17 June 2023: Hillary Gerardi set a new women's fastest known time with 7 hours, 27 minutes and 39 seconds, taking a longer but safer route via the Arête Nord due to serac fall.

=== Incidents involving children ===
In July 2014, an American entrepreneur and traveller Patrick Sweeney attempted to break the record with his nine-year-old son and 11-year-old daughter. They were caught in an avalanche, escaped death and decided not to pursue their attempt.

In August 2014, an unknown Austrian climber with his 5-year-old son were intercepted by mountain gendarmes at 3,200 m (10,500 ft) and forced to turn back.

On 5 August 2017, 9-year-old Hungarian twins and their mother were rescued from 3,800 m (12,500 ft) by helicopter while their father and family friend continued their summit attempt.

== Cultural references ==
=== Cinema and television ===
- La Terre, son visage, is a documentary by Jean-Luc Prévost and published by Édition Société national de télévision française, released in 1984. It is part of the Haroun Tazieff raconte sa terre, vol. 1 series. In it he talks about the west–east crossing of Mont Blanc.
- The film Malabar Princess.
- The television-film Premier de cordée.
- Storm over Mont Blanc (Stürme über dem Mont Blanc, 1930) with Leni Riefenstahl and directed by Arnold Fanck
- La Roue (The Wheel, 1923) is a 273-minute film by Abel Gance depicting rail operations, workers, and families in south-eastern France, including the Mont Blanc area.
- The Tripods (1985/86) BBC TV adapatation of the first two novels in John Christopher’s Tripods trilogy (The White Mountains, The City of Gold and Lead), which ran for 25 episodes over two seasons. The main characters are journeying to Mont Blanc where a group of humans free of the Tripods’ subjugation live.

=== Literature ===
- Premier de cordée by Roger Frison-Roche
- Hugo et le Mont Blanc by Colette Cosnie – Édition Guérin
- Hymn Before Sunrise, in the Vale of Chamouni by Samuel Taylor Coleridge
- Manfred by Lord Byron
- Frankenstein; or, The Modern Prometheus by Mary Shelley
- Mont Blanc by Percy Shelley
- Point Blanc by Anthony Horowitz
- The Prelude Book VI by William Wordsworth
- Mont Blanc., by Letitia Elizabeth Landon, a poem to accompany an engraving of a painting by J. M. W. Turner.
- Kordian by Juliusz Słowacki
- Eiger Dreams: Ventures Among Men and Mountains by Jon Krakauer
- Running Water by AEW Mason
- La neige en deuil by Henri Troyat
- The Tripods trilogy by John Christopher

== Protection ==
The Mont Blanc massif is being put forward as a potential World Heritage Site because of its uniqueness and cultural importance considered the birthplace and symbol of modern mountaineering. It would require the three governments of Italy, France and Switzerland to request UNESCO for it to be listed.

Mont Blanc is one of the most visited tourist destinations in the world. For this reason, some view it as threatened. Pro-Mont Blanc (an international collective of associations for the protection of Mont Blanc) published in 2002 the book Le versant noir du mont Blanc (The black hillside of Mont Blanc), which exposes current and future problems in conserving the site.

In 2007, Europe's two highest toilets (at 4,260 metres, 13,976 feet) were taken by helicopter to the top of Mont Blanc. They are also serviced by helicopter. They will serve 30,000 skiers and hikers annually, helping to alleviate the discharge of urine and faeces that spreads down the mountain face with the spring thaw.

Global warming has begun to melt glaciers and cause avalanches on Mont Blanc, creating more dangerous climbing conditions.

== Panorama ==
360° panorama from Mont Blanc
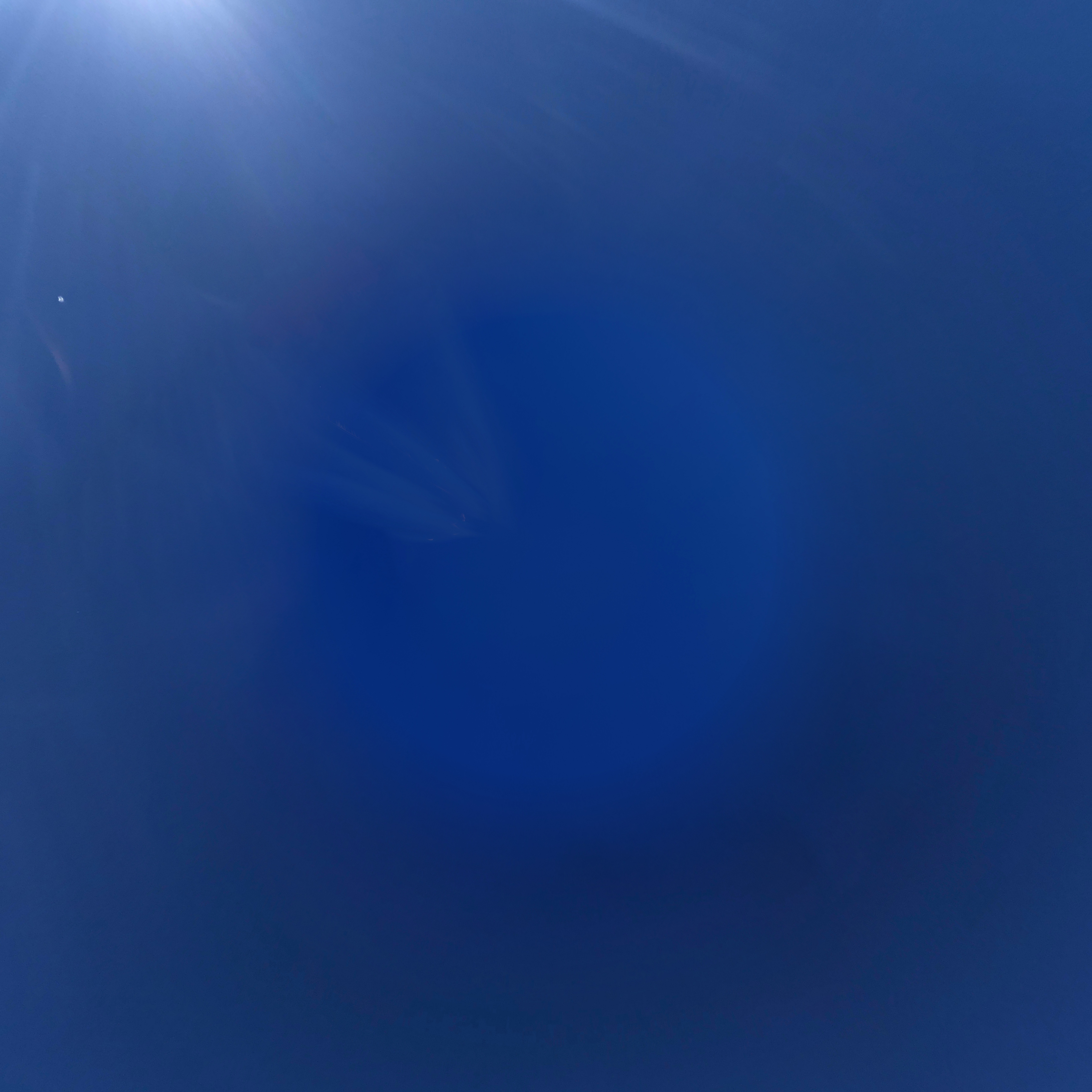
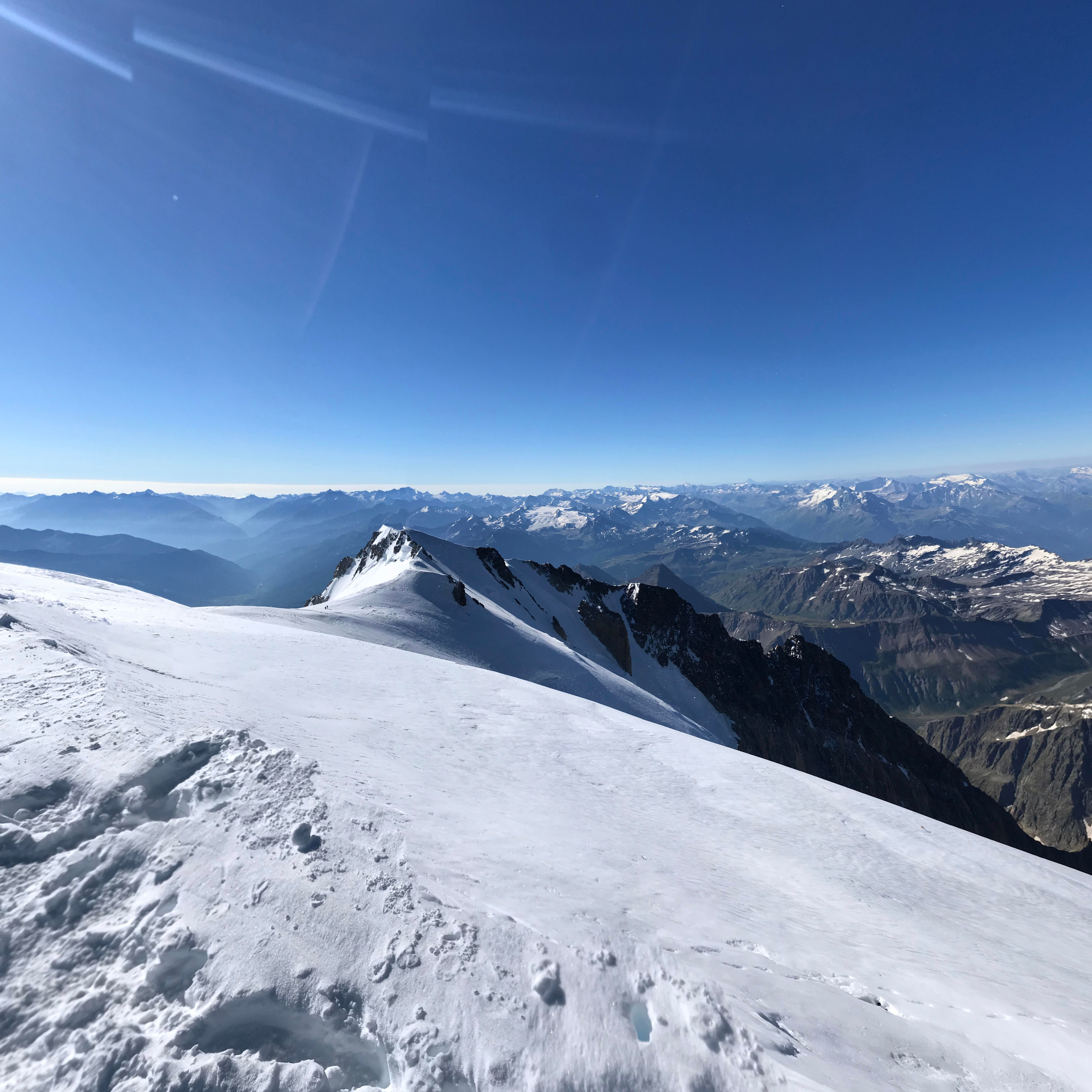
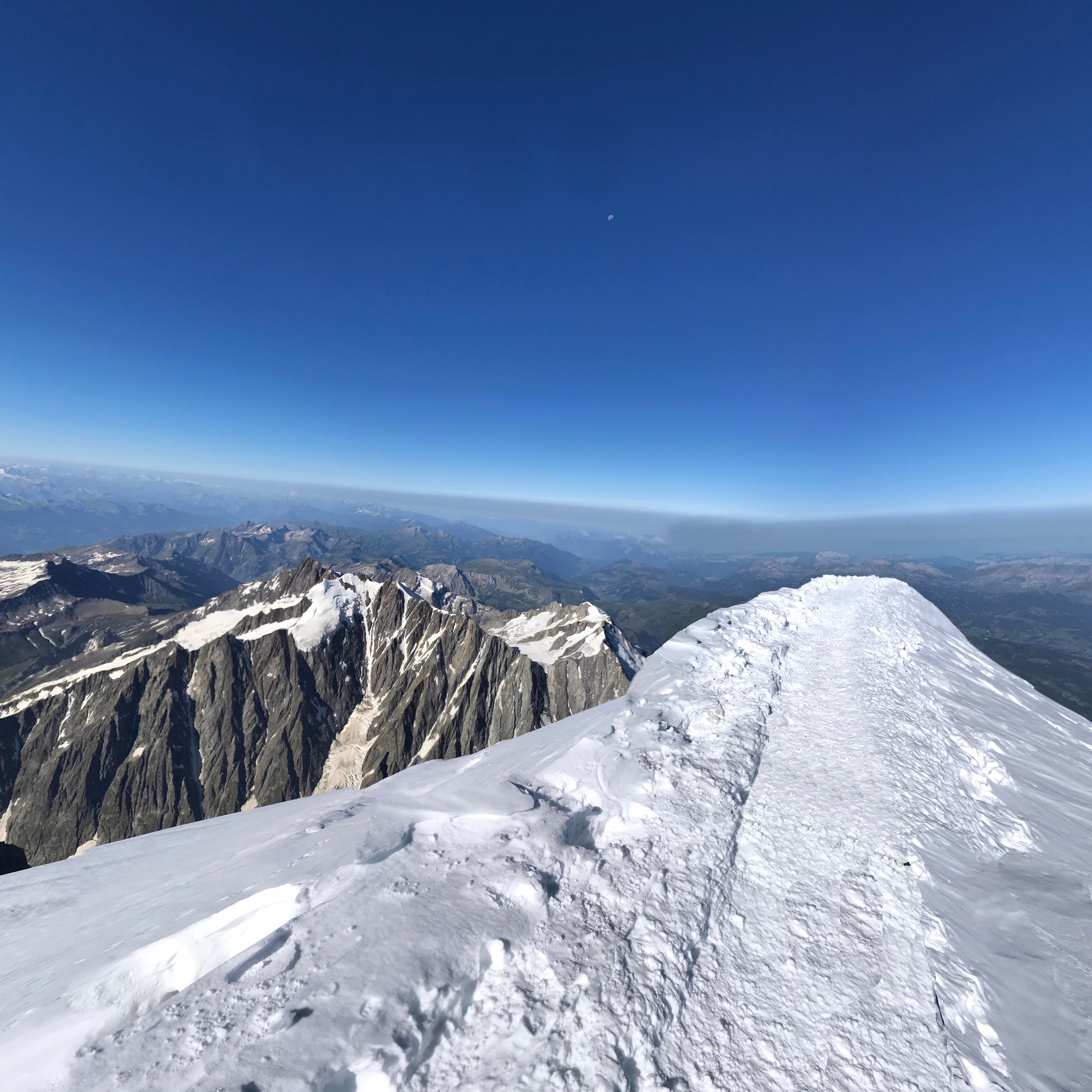
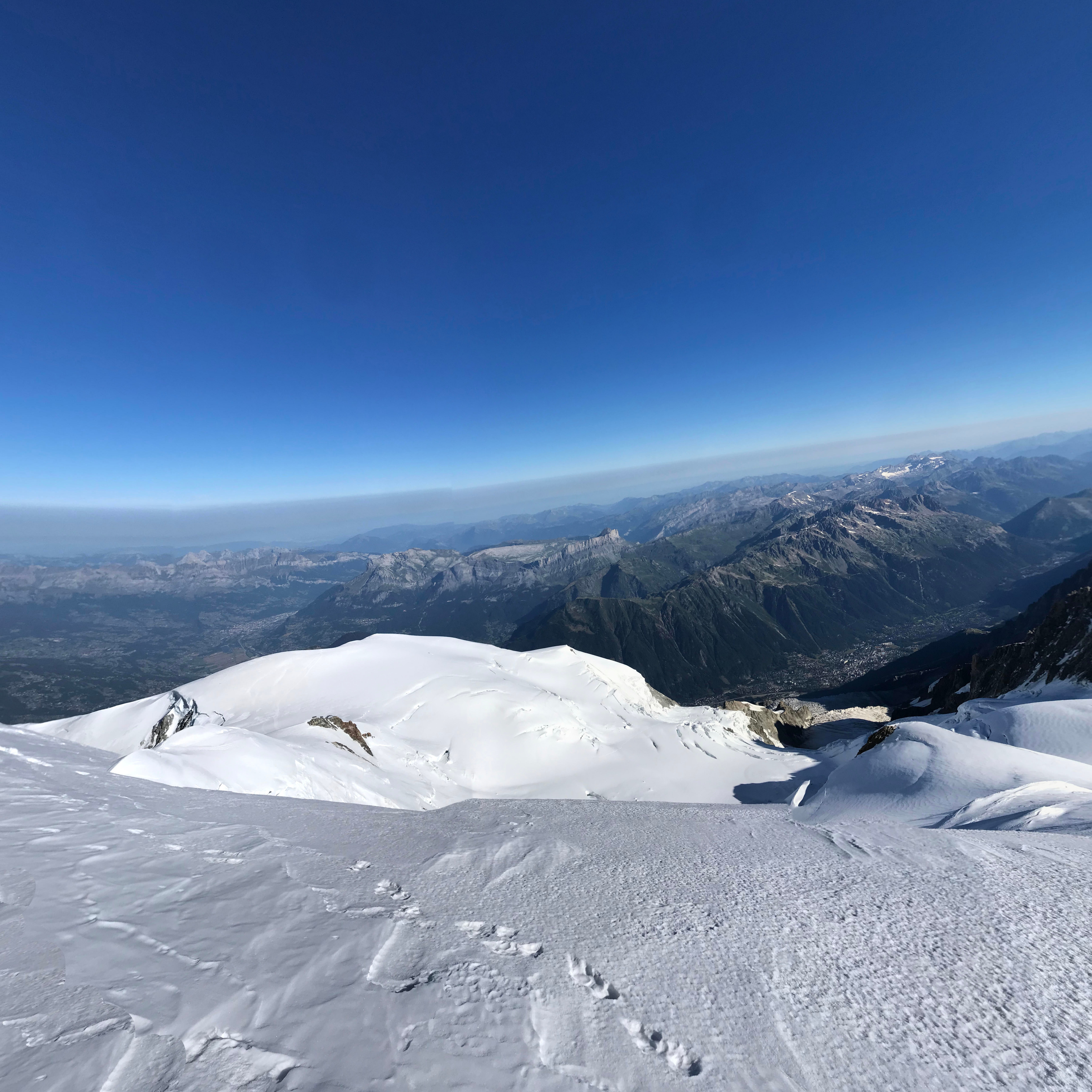
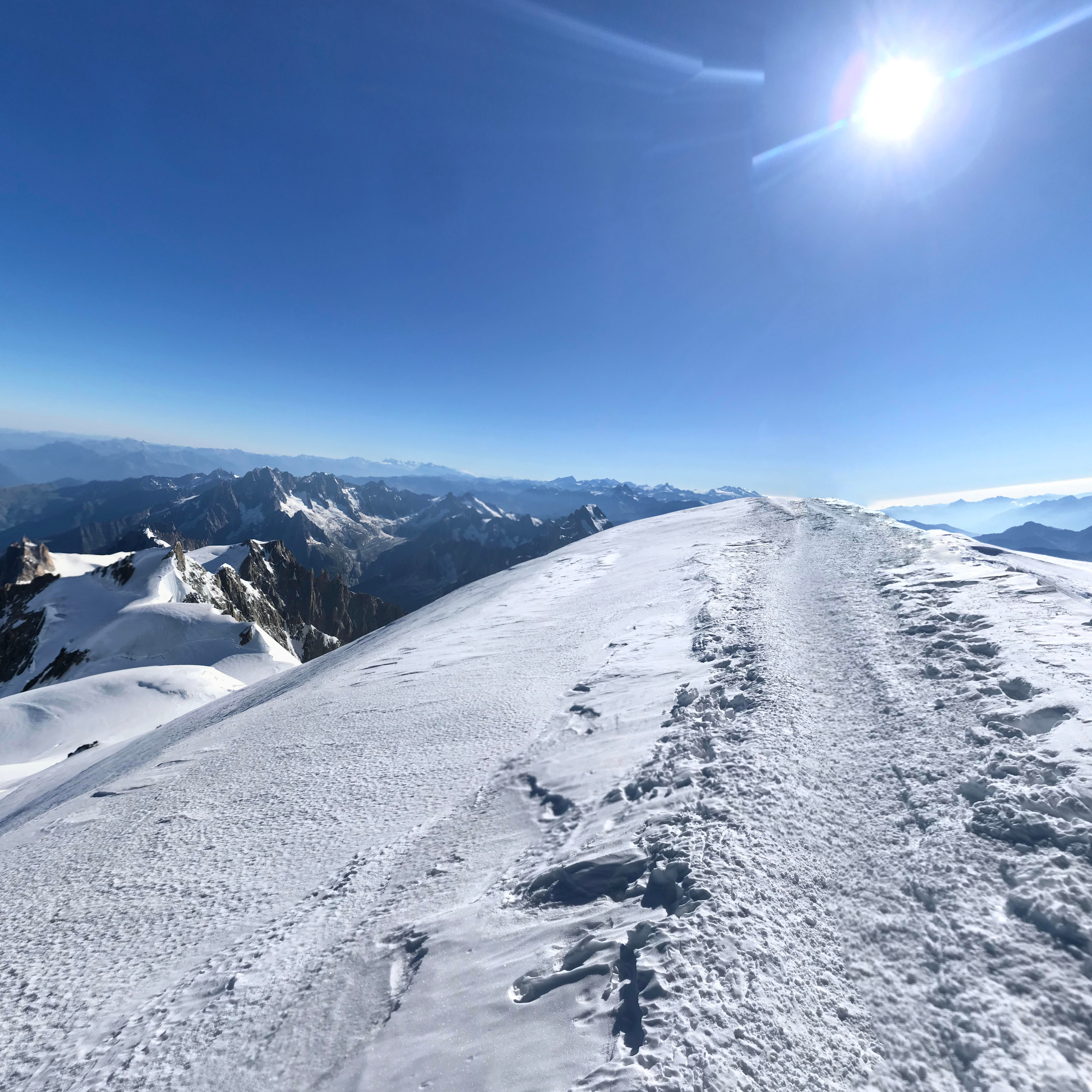
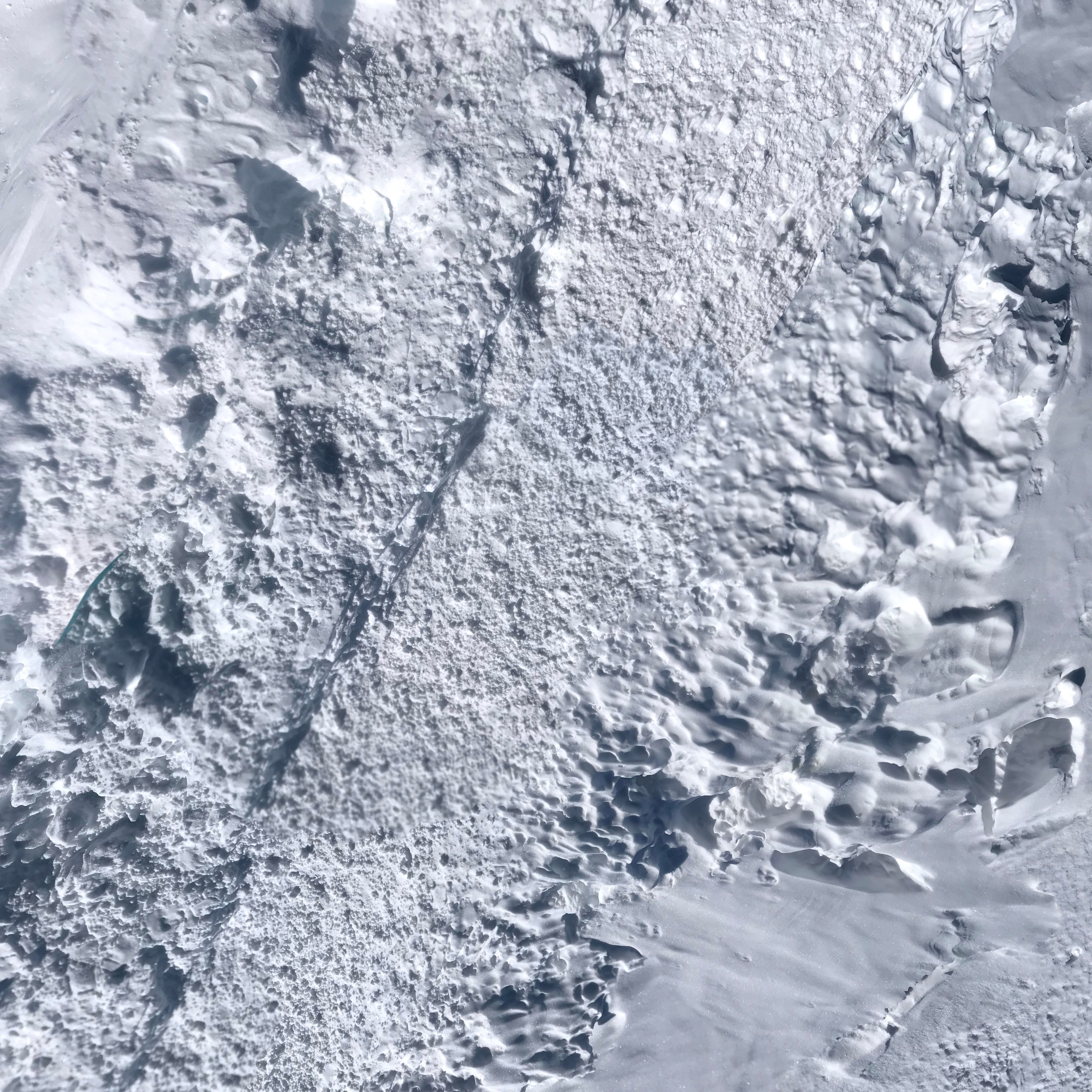
Spherical panorama from Mont Blanc

== See also ==
- Exploration of the High Alps
- Haute Route
- Mont Blanc (Moon)
- Tête Rousse Glacier
- Mont Blanc massif
- Mont Blanc Tramway
- Mont Blanc Tunnel
- Tour du Mont Blanc
- Top of the Mont Blanc
- List of Alpine four-thousanders
