= Air India Flight 245 =

1950 aviation accident in France

Coordinates: 45°49′59″N 6°51′35″E

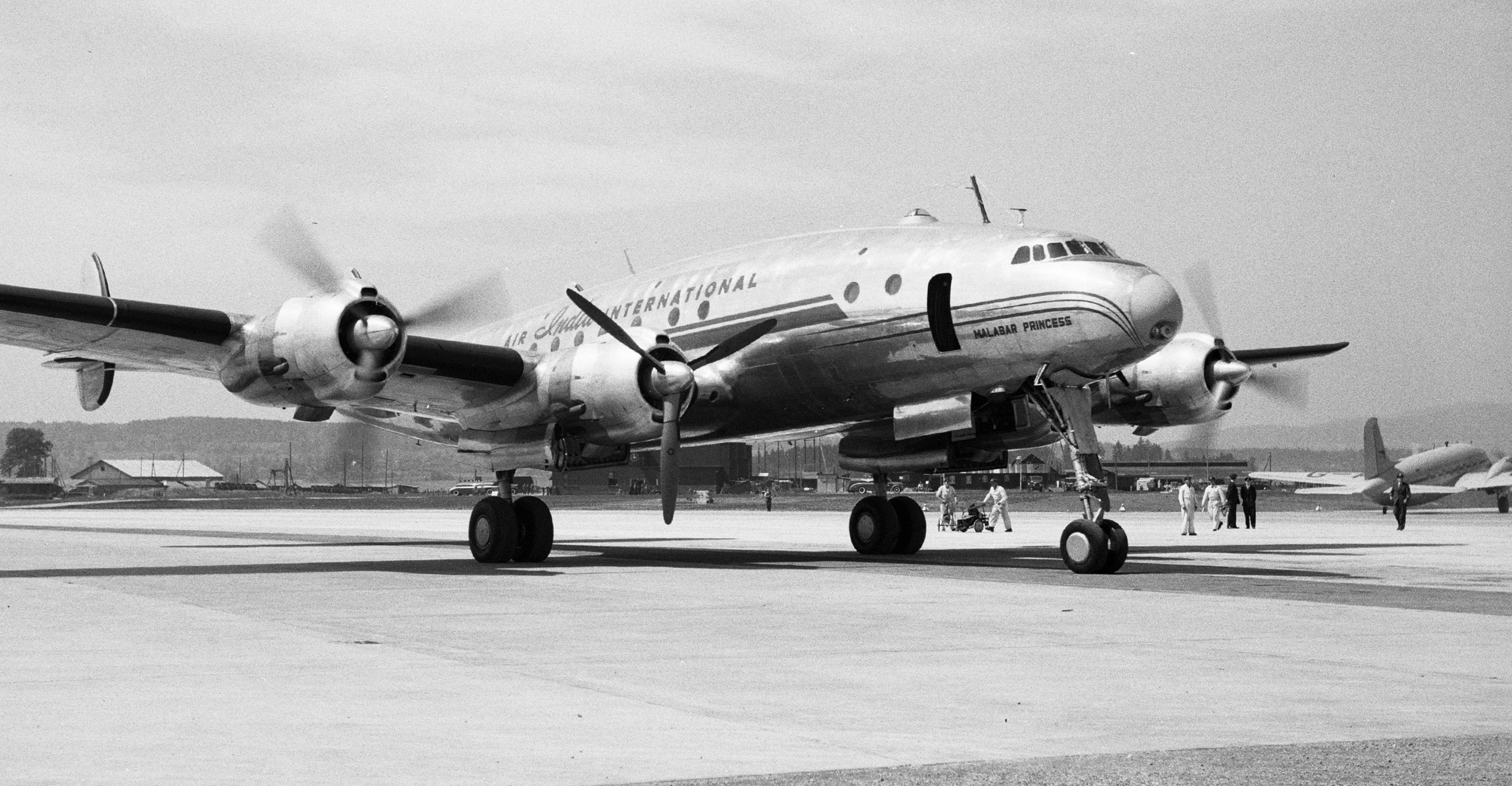
- VT-CQP, the aircraft involved in the accident, in 1949

Accident
- Date: 3 November 1950
- Summary: Controlled flight into terrain in poor weather
- Site: Mont Blanc, France

Aircraft
- Aircraft type: Lockheed L-749A Constellation
- Aircraft name: Malabar Princess
- Operator: Air India
- IATA flight No.: AI245
- ICAO flight No.: AIC245
- Call sign: AIRINDIA 245
- Registration: VT-CQP
- Flight origin: Sahar International Airport, Bombay, India
- 1st stopover: Cairo International Airport, Cairo, Egypt
- 2nd stopover: Cointrin Airport, Geneva, Switzerland
- Destination: London Heathrow Airport, London, United Kingdom
- Occupants: 48
- Passengers: 40
- Crew: 8
- Fatalities: 48
- Survivors: 0

Air India Flight 245 was a scheduled Air India passenger flight from Bombay to London via Cairo and Geneva. On the morning of 3 November 1950, the Lockheed L-749A Constellation serving the flight crashed into Mont Blanc, France, while approaching Geneva. All 48 aboard were killed.

The plane operating the flight was named Malabar Princess, registered as VT-CQP. It was piloted by Captain Alan R. Saint, 34, and co-pilot V. Y. Korgaokar and was carrying 40 passengers and 8 crew. The flight navigator was Raghuram Iyengar, a resident of Matunga, Mumbai. While over France, descending towards Geneva Airport, the flight crashed into the French Alps in stormy weather, killing all on board.

== Accident ==
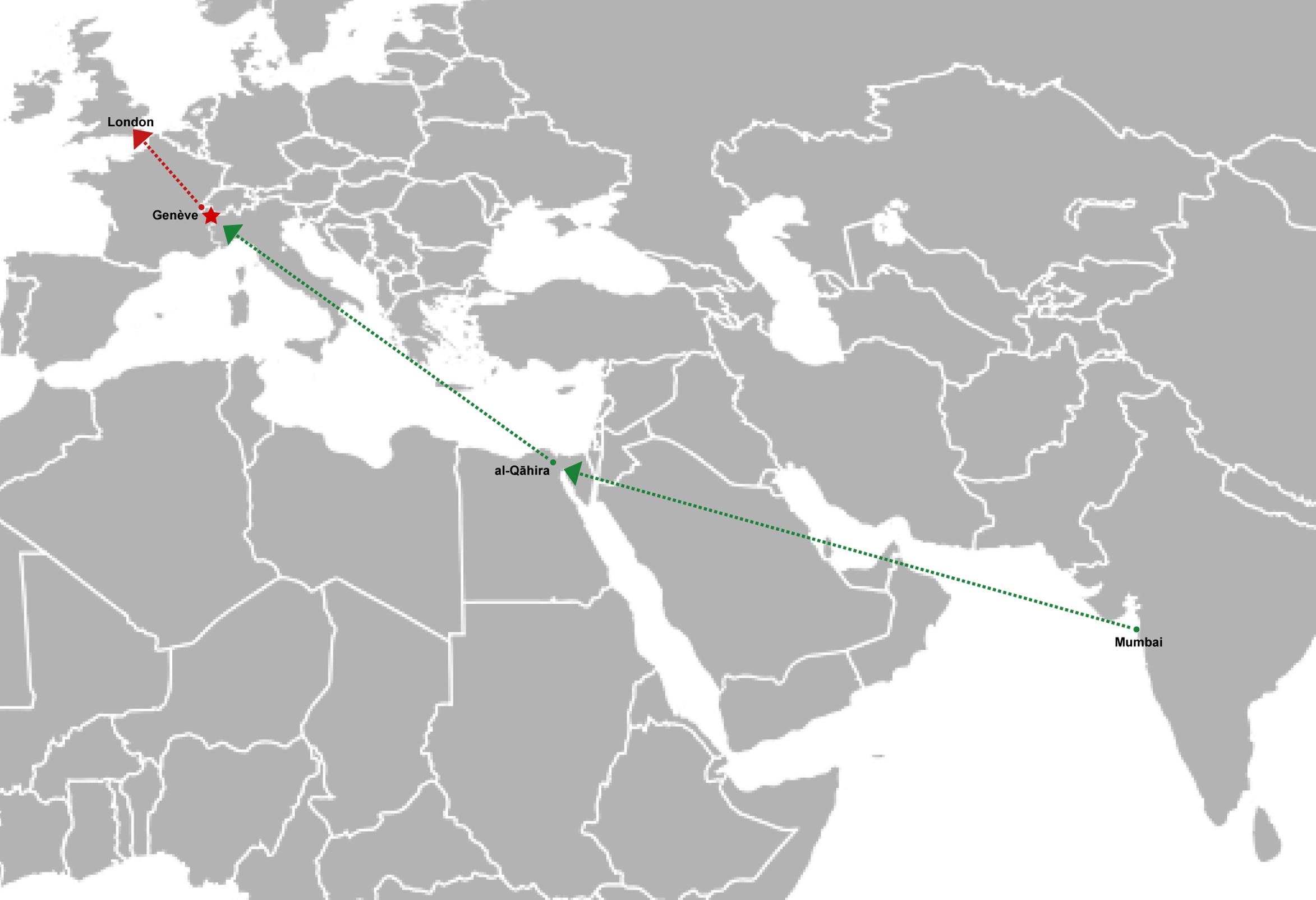
AI 245 flight route

The airplane hit the face of the Rocher de la Tournette at a height of 4,677 m (15,344 ft), on the French side of Mont Blanc. Stormy weather prevented immediate rescue efforts; debris was located by a Swiss plane on 5 November, and rescue parties reached the site two days later. There were no survivors. The last transmission from the aircraft, received by controllers at Grenoble and Geneva, was "I am vertical with Voiron, at 4700 meters altitude." at 10:43 a.m.

== Aftermath ==
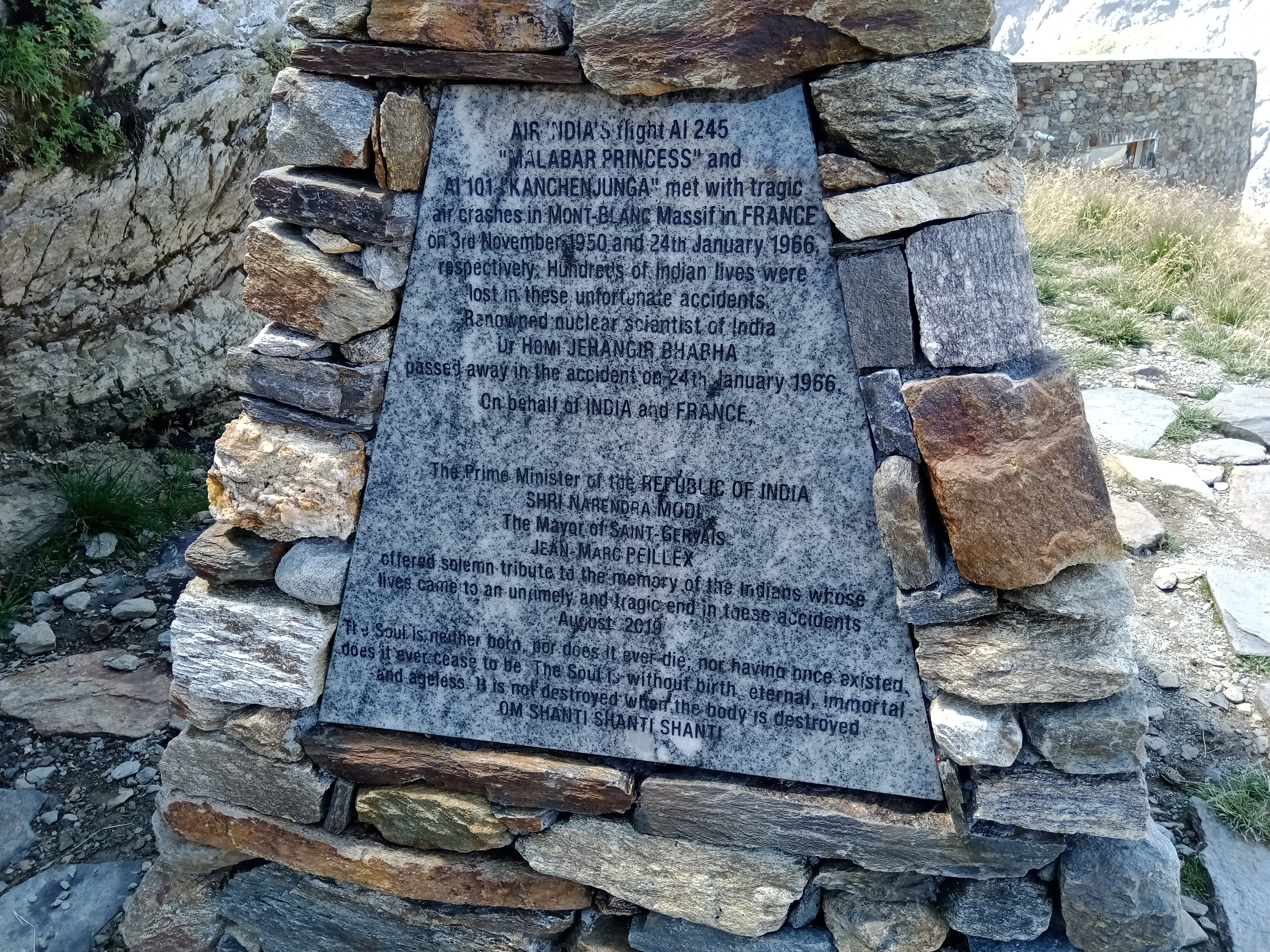
English text of the monument at refuge du Nid d'Aigle in Mont-Blanc Massif

Some mail on board the flight was recovered after the accident and was annotated with "Retardé par suite d'accident aérien" ("delayed due to aviation accident"); further items of mail were found in 1951 and 1952.

On 8 June 1978, a patrol of the French mountain police found letters and a sack at the foot of the Bossons Glacier. Recovered were 57 envelopes and 55 letters (without envelopes) and all but eight letters were forwarded to their original addressees. Sixteen years after the accident, Air India Flight 101 crashed in almost exactly the same spot under similar circumstances.

In 2008 one of the engines from the crashed flight was discovered. In September 2013, a climber discovered a cache of jewelry that is believed to have been aboard one of these two flights.

== In popular culture ==
- Malabar Princess, the name of the aircraft involved in the incident, served as the inspiration for the title of the 2025 album of the same name by Swiss singer Vendredi sur Mer.
