= Charles François Exchaquet =

Swiss engineer, cartographer and mountaineer

Charles-François Exchaquet born 6 December 1746 in Court in the canton of Berne and died in 1792 in Servoz in Savoie, was a Swiss engineer, cartographer and mountaineer.

== Biography ==
In 1781 he became director of the smelting works of Servoz, responsible for the mineral and metallurgical operations. In 1787, he was the first tourist to cross the Col du Géant, the mountain saddle between the Tour Ronde and the Dent du Géant, from Chamonix in the Arve Valley to Courmayeur in Val d'Aosta. Since the same year he manufactured and sold relief maps of the Mont-Blanc Massif and the Saint-Gotthard Massif.

== Bibliography ==
- L. Seylaz, « Un émule de H. B. de Saussure: C.-F. Exchaquet [archive] », in Les Alpes, 11, 1935, pages 187-195
- L. Touret, « C.-F. Exchaquet et les Plans en Relief du Mont-Blanc », in Annals of Science, 46, 1989, pages 1–20
- Marc Weidmann, « Exchaquet, Charles-François [archive] » in online Dictionnaire historique de la Suisse.
- Pierre-Yves Pièce, « Des révélations qui ne manquent pas de relief ! [archive] », in Le Saumoduc – Bulletin de l'Association Cum Grano Salis, no 8, 2012, p. 7-10.
- Pierre-Yves Pièce, « Révélations autour d'un relief commandé au 18e siècle par la Haute Direction des Sels [archive] », in Le Saumoduc – Bulletin de l'Association Cum Grano Salis, no 7, 2012, p. 8-9.
