= Val Veny =

Lateral valley of the Mont Blanc massif

Coordinates: 45°47′40″N 6°54′55″E

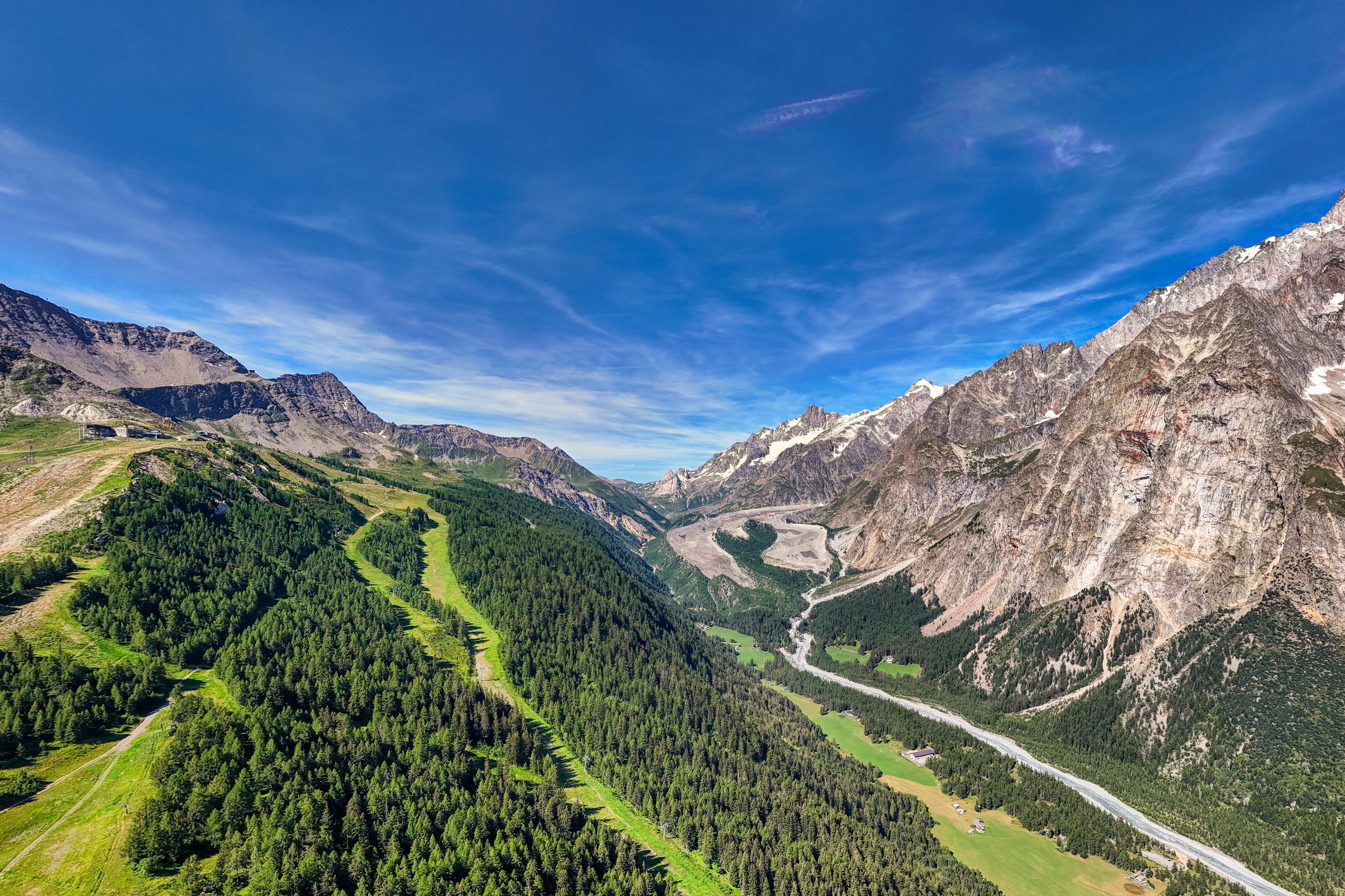
Val Vény

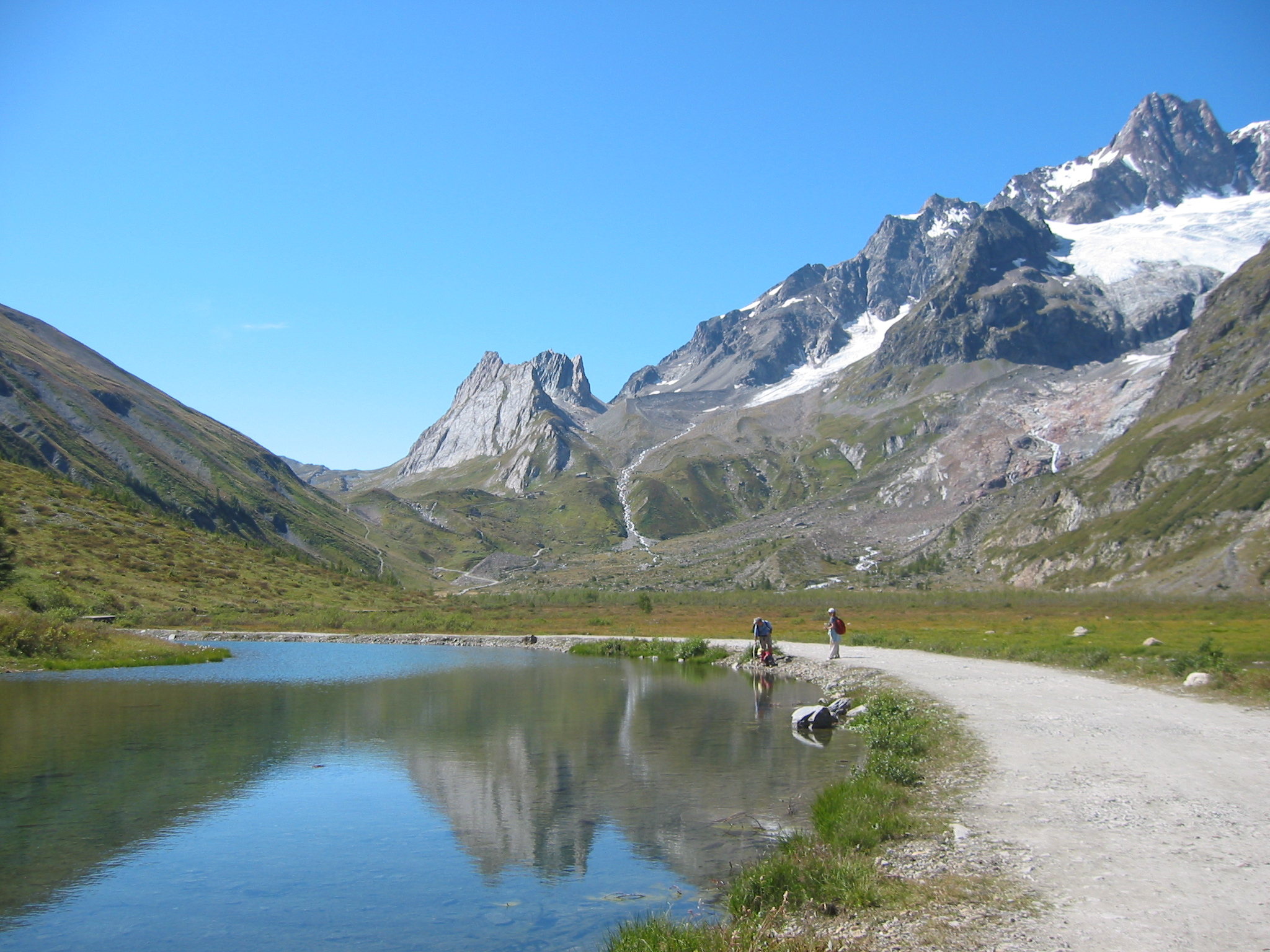
Upper Val Veny from near the refuge Élisabeth

Val Veny (also Val Vény) is a lateral valley of the Mont Blanc massif, lying to the south-west of Courmayeur, at 2514m above sea level. The valley head is at the Seigne Pass.

== Geography ==
Val Veny was formed by two glaciers: the Miage Glacier and the Brenva Glacier.

Val Veny is divided into three parts:

- the part that lies parallel to the Mont Blanc massif, between the Seigne pass (2,512m) and part of the Miage Glacier
- the part called Plan Vény
- the mouth of the valley, dominated by Mont Blanc and the lower Brenva Glacier (1,444m)

Chécrouit Lake (2,165m) lies on the right side of the Val Veny, near Courmayeur. On the opposite side you can see Mont Blanc, the Dent du Géant (4,013 m ) and the Brenva Glacier.

At the entrance of the valley lies the Notre Dame de Guérison sanctuary.

== Mountaineering ==
Val Veny is the starting point of the normal Italian route on Mont Blanc via the Miage Glacier and the Gonella mountain hut.

== Shelters and bivouacs ==
- Refuge Mont-Blanc - 1,700m
- Refuge Maison Vieille - 1,956m
- Refuge Élisabeth - 2,195m
- Refuge Monzino - 2,590m
- Refuge Francesco Gonella - 3,071m
- Refuge Durier - 3,358m
- Refuge Quintino Sella - 3,363m
- Bivouac Lorenzo Borelli - Carlo Pivano - 2,310m
- Bivouac Adolphe Hess - 2,958m
- Bivouac Gino Rainetto - 3,047m
- Bivouac de la Brenva - 3,060m
- Bivouac Piero Craveri - 3,490m
- Bivouac Alberico - Borgna à la Fourche - 3,680m
- Bivouac Marco Crippa - 3,850m
- Bivouac Giuseppe Lampugnani - 3,860m

== See also ==
- Valdigne
