= Dora Baltea =

River in northwestern Italy

Dora Baltea Doire Baltée
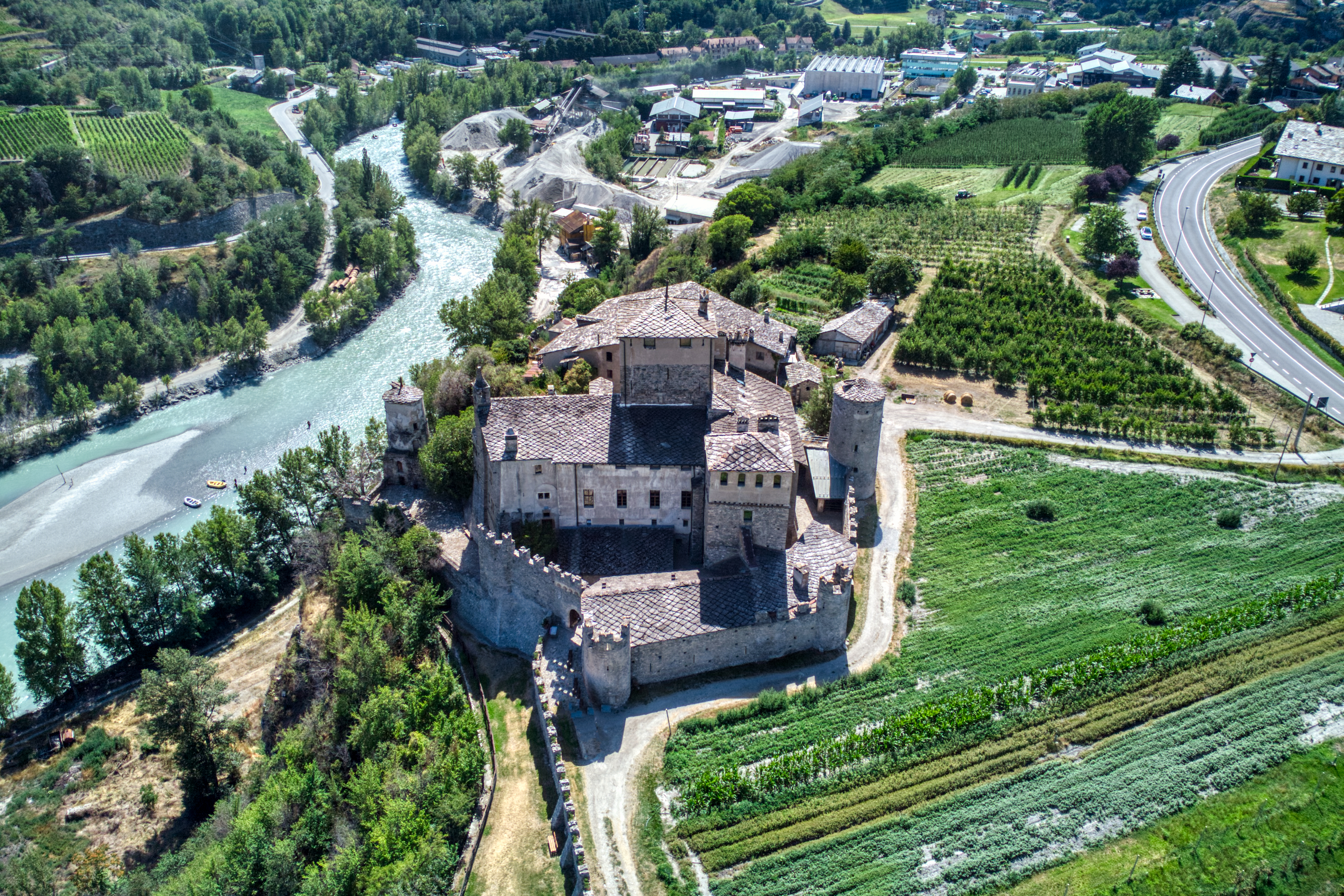
- The river near Sarriod de la Tour Castle

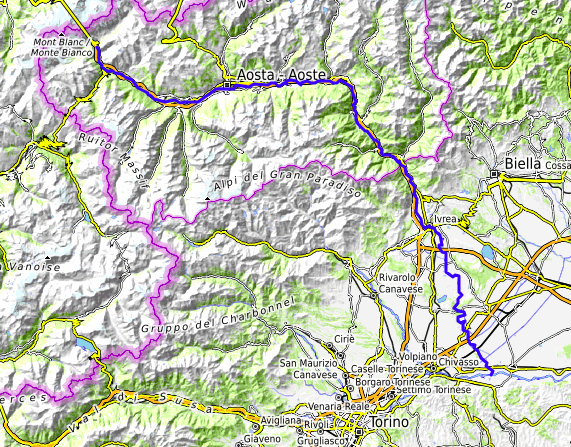
- Dora Baltea location
- Native name: Duère Baltèa; Jouère Baltèa; Djouiye (Arpitan); Deura Bàutia; Deura (Piedmontese)

Location
- Country: Italy
- Region: Aosta Valley

Physical characteristics
- Source
  - location: Entrèves near Courmayeur
  - elevation: 1,400 m (4,600 ft)
- Mouth
  - location: Po near Crescentino
  - coordinates: 45.1804°N 8.0477°E
- Length: 168.3 km (105 mi)
- Basin size: 3,890.52 km^{2} (1,502 mi^{2})
- Discharge
  - average: (mouth) 96.0 m^{3}/s (3,390 cu ft/s)

Basin features
- Progression: Po→ Adriatic Sea
- Tributaries
  - left: Buthier, Saint-Barthélemy, Marmore, Évançon, Lys
  - right: Doire de Verney, Savara, Grand'Eyvia, Chalamy, Ayasse, Chiusella

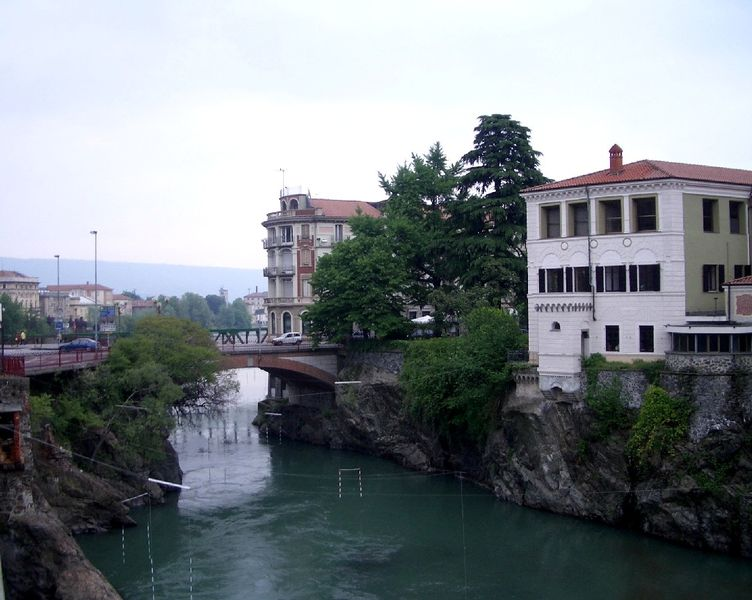
The river at Ivrea

The Dora Baltea (Italian: [ˈdɔːra ˈbaltea]; Piedmontese: Deura Bàutia or simply Deura) or Doire Baltée (French: [dwaʁ balte]; Valdôtain: Duère Baltèa, Jouère Baltèa or Djouiye, depending on the orthography) is a river in the Aosta Valley and in Piedmont, in northwestern Italy. It is a left-bank tributary of the Po and is about 170 kilometres (110 mi) long.

== Name ==
The river's Latin name was Duria maior, Duria Baltica or Duria Bautica. Strabo called it Δουριας (Dourias) in Greek. The name comes from the Celtic root *dubr- ("flow"), itself from the Proto-Indo-European root *dʰew- ("flow"). This root can be found in many European river names, such as Douro. The second element may derive from the Illyrian root *balta ("‘swamp, marsh, white clay").

The river is called Duère Baltèa in Arpitan, Djouiye in Valdôtain, and Deura Bàutia in Piedmontese.

== Geography ==
It originates by Mont Blanc as the confluence of the Dora di Ferret, fed by the Pré de Bar Glacier in Val Ferret, and the Dora di Veny, fed by the Miage Glacier and Brenva Glacier in Val Veny.

As it crosses the Aosta Valley, the Dora Baltea flows through the city of Aosta (where the Buthier runs into it) and near all the main cities of the lower Aosta Valley: Châtillon, Saint-Vincent, Verrès and Pont-Saint-Martin. After it enters Piedmont, it passes through the city of Ivrea and a good part of Canavese, receives from its right the Chiusella and reaches the Po at Crescentino, a little downstream from Chivasso.

== Water uses ==
It is a popular place for whitewater rafting and kayaking, with its waters feeding, for instance, the Ivrea Whitewater Stadium. Early in the summer, in May and June, the river is usually high with snow melt from the mountains. During July, August and September the water levels are usually lower and the temperature warmer.

== See also ==
- Dora Riparia, another tributary of the Po
- Natale Capellaro Walkway, a footbridge that crosses the river in Ivrea
