= Gonella Hut =

Mountain hut in the Aosta Valley

- Rifugio Francesco Gonella; Refuge Francesco Gonella
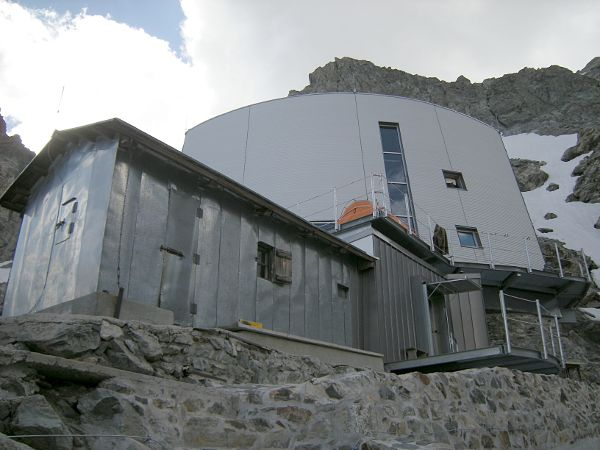
- Gonella Hut

Highest point
- Elevation: 3,071 m (10,075 ft)
- Coordinates: 45°49′09″N 006°49′56″E

Geography
- Location within Alps
- Location: Italy

The Gonella Hut (French: Refuge Francesco Gonella; Italian: Rifugio Francesco Gonella), sometimes called in Italian Rifugio del Dôme or in French Refuge du Dôme ("Dôme Hut"), is a high elevation mountain hut in the Aosta Valley in the Mont Blanc massif area of the Alps. It lies at an elevation of 3071 metres, above Val Veny near Courmayeur in Italy. The refuge is located on the Italian normal route to Mont Blanc.

== History ==
The hut was rebuilt between August 2006 and July 2011, and offers accommodation for 60 people, and is wardened between mid-July and mid-September. The old winter hut remains open all year round.

== Access ==
The Gonella Hut is situated on the Aiguilles grises ridge, that separates the Dôme Glacier from the Italian Bionnassay Glacier.

The climb to the refuge starts at La Visaille / plan Lognan (1,670 m) and follows the track towards Plan Combal (1,990 m). Not far away lies the Miage Lake. Near the Miage glacier, the trailhead S15 leads to the hut at 3,071 m.

At about 2,400 m, the Mont Blanc glacier (French: Glacier du Mont-Blanc) is reached, which is fed from the southwest slopes of Mont Blanc.

At an elevation of 2,650 m the trail finally leaves the Miage glaciers and rises over steep rocks to the hut. It takes approximately 5 ½ hours reach the Gonella Refuge from La Visaille, graded at F

== Mountaineering ==
=== Summit ascents ===
The following peaks can be reached from the Gonella Refuge:

- Aiguille Grises - (3,837 m)
- Dôme du Goûter - (4,304 m)
- Aiguille de Bionnassay - (4052 m)
- Mont Blanc (4,810 m)

=== Hut to hut ===
Reaching any other hut from the Gonella Refuge involves serious mountaineering on glacial terrain at elevations above 4,000 metres.

- Grands Mulets Hut (3,050 m) on the Col du Dôme (4,237 m).
- Goûter Hut (3,817 m) on the Col du Dôme.
- Tête Rousse Hut (3,197 m) over the Col de Bionassay (3892 m).
- Durier Hut (3,349 m) over the Aiguille de Bionnassay to the Col de Miage (3,356 m).
