= Valdigne =

Upper part of the Aosta Valley in north-west Italy

The Valdigne (French: [valdiɲ]) is the upper part of the Aosta Valley in north-west Italy. It is traversed by the Dora Baltea (French: Doire baltée), a tributary of the Po.

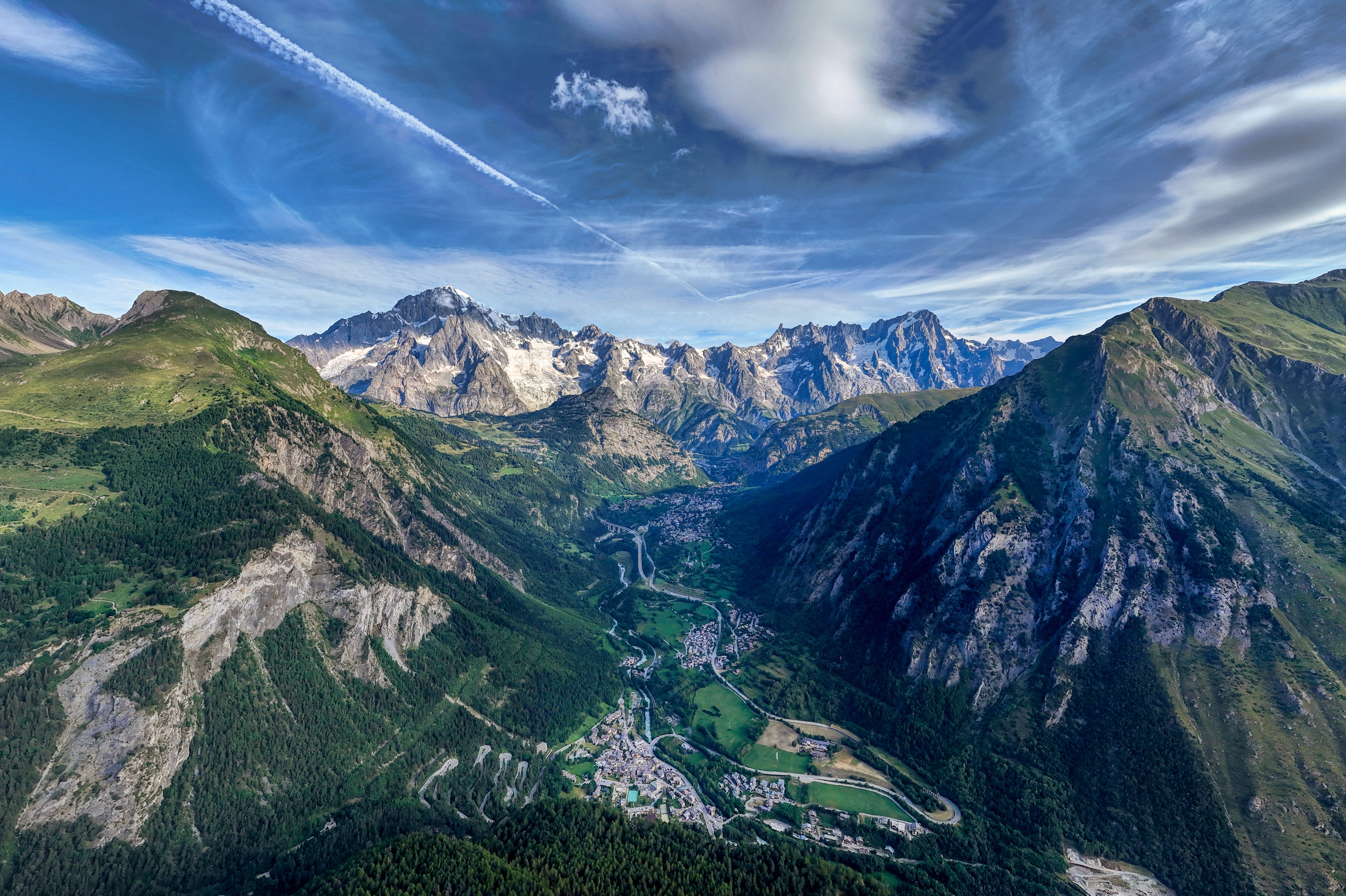

== Description ==
It extends from La Salle to Courmayeur, including the side valleys of Val Ferret, Val Veny and La Thuile Valley.

The communes of the Valdigne are Courmayeur, La Salle, La Thuile, Morgex and Pré-Saint-Didier: together they form the Unité des communes valdôtaines du Valdigne - Mont-Blanc.

== Notes ==
This article was originally translated from Valdigne, its counterpart from the Italian Wikipedia.
