= Aiguille de Bionnassay =

Mountain in the Mont Blanc massif

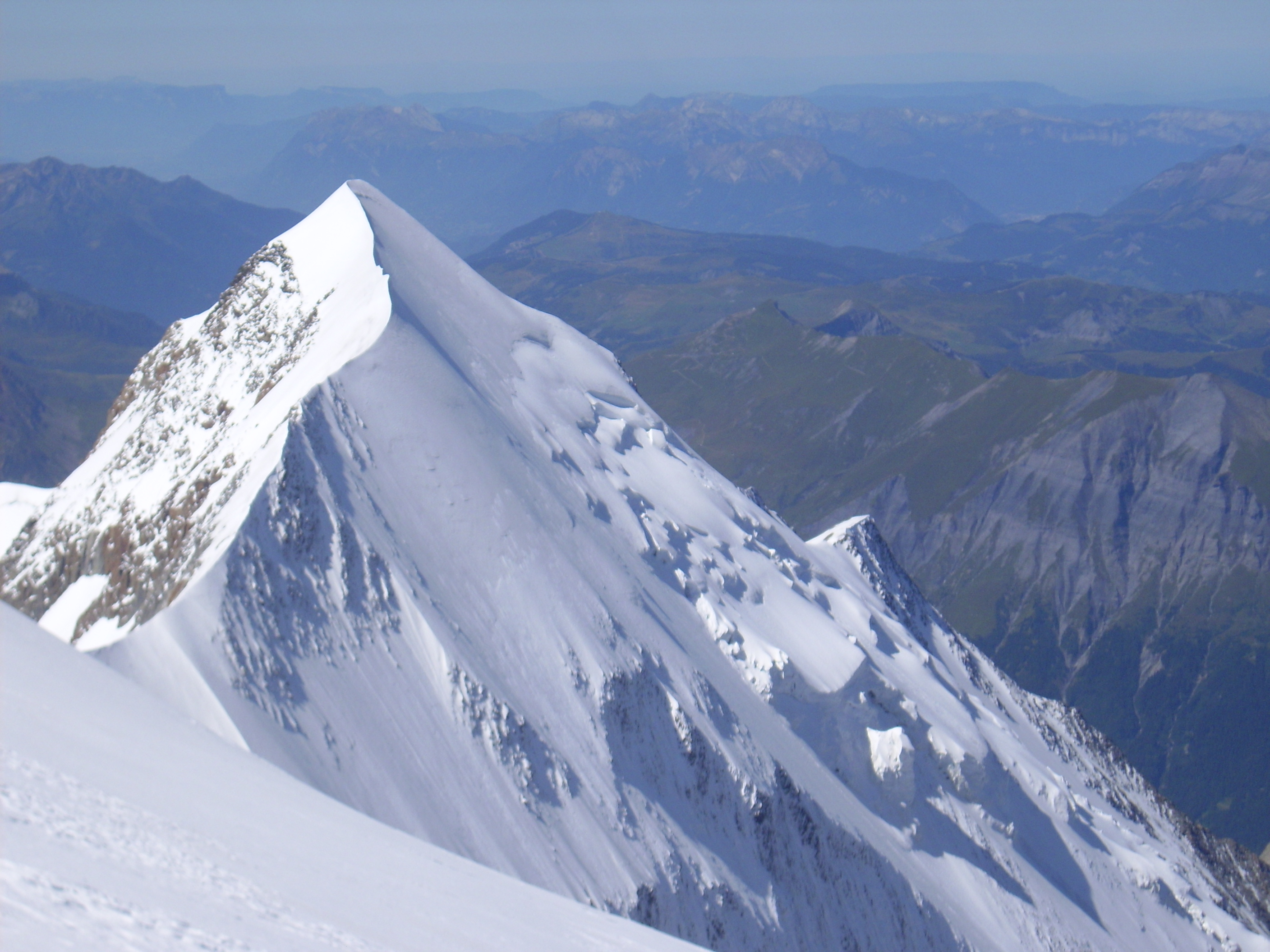
- Summit, east ridge and glaciated north-west face of the Aiguille de Bionnassay

Highest point
- Prominence: 164 m (538 ft)
- Coordinates: 45°50′09″N 06°49′05″E

Geography
- Location within France
- Location: Haute-Savoie, Rhône-Alpes, France; Aosta Valley, Italy
- Parent range: Mont Blanc massif

Climbing
- First ascent: 28 July 1865 by Edward N. Buxton, Florence Crauford Grove and Reginald S. McDonald, with guides Jean Pierre Cachat and Michel Payot. (north-west face).

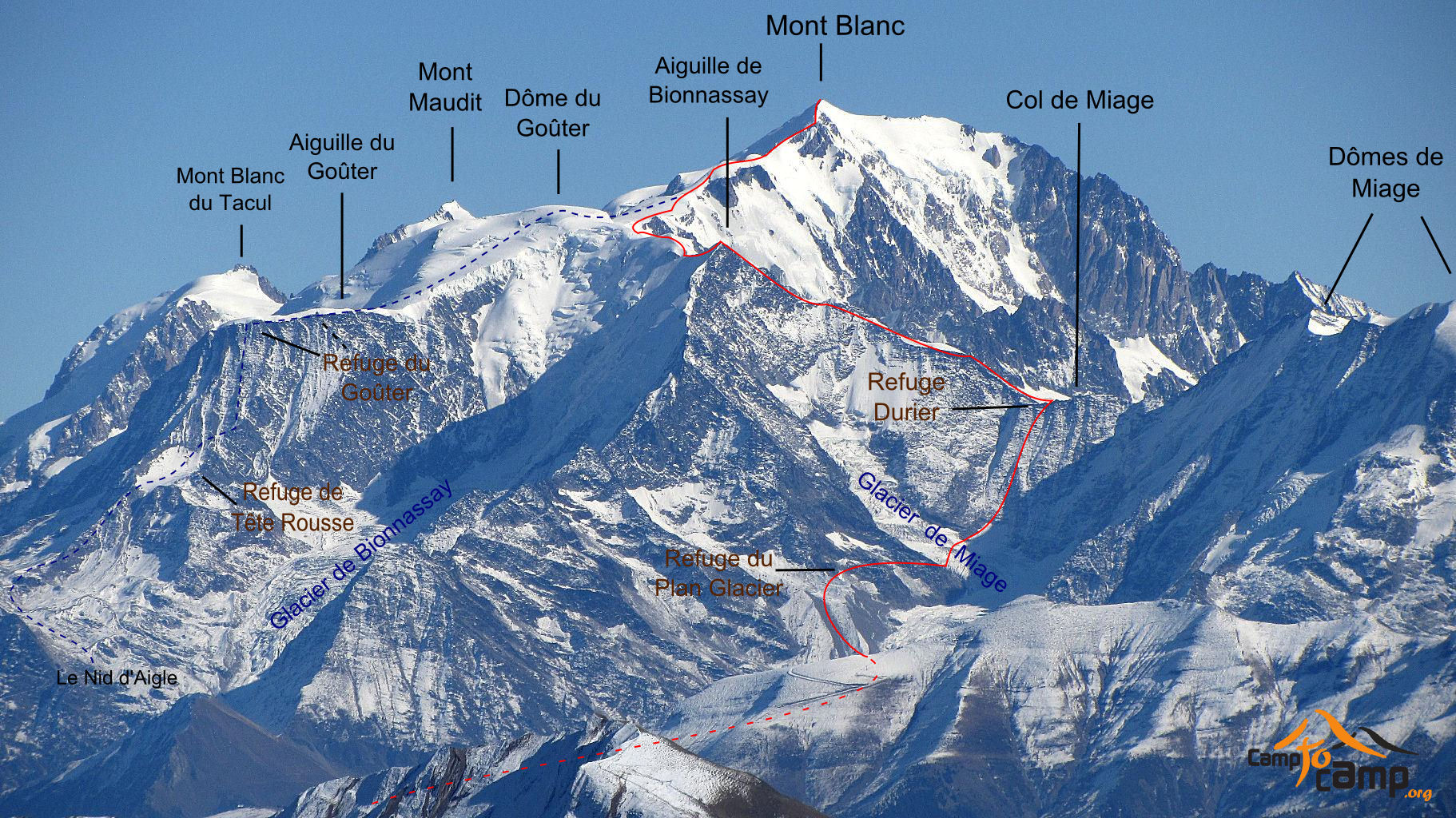
Ascent of Mont Blanc, showing route from Plan Glacier to Durier Hut, over Aiguille de Bionnassay, Dome du Gouter, Bosses ridge to Mont Blanc summit. Return route via Le Goûter is shown in blue.

The Aiguille de Bionnassay (French pronunciation: [ɛɡɥij də bjɔnasɛ]; elevation 4,052 metres (13,294 ft)) is a mountain in the Mont Blanc massif of the Alps in France and Italy. It has been described as "one of the most attractive satellite peaks of Mont Blanc", and is located on its western side. The mountain's south and east ridges form the frontier between the two countries, and its summit is a knife-edge crest of snow and ice. Reaching it via any route provides a "splendid and serious snow and ice climb".

== Glaciers ==
Three significant glaciers originate on the slopes of the mountain: The Glacier de Bionnassay, the Glacier de Bionnassay Italien, and the Glacier de Miage.

The Glacier de Bionnassay is the most obvious glacial feature, arising on the north and north-west slopes of the Aiguille de Bionnassay as well as from the western side of the Dôme du Goûter and the Aiguille du Goûter. It descends for approximately 4.5 km, flowing north-westwards before turning north at the foot of the Nid d'Aigle to end some distance above the settlement of Bionnassay, continuing as the Torrent de Bionnassay. This hanging glacier on the north-west face of the Aiguille de Bionnassay provides a route of access for mountaineers with ice-climbing skills.

The Glacier de Bionnassay Italien arises from a cirque between the south eastern side of the Aiguille de Bionnassay, the Col de Bionnassay and the Calotte des Aiguilles Grises. It descends south-south west for 2.5 km below the Col Infranchissable, then turns south-east to merge with other glaciers, thence continuing as the Miage Glacier – a total distance of approximately 9 km, forming the longest glacier in Italy.

The Glacier de Miage – not to be confused with the much larger Glacier du Miage on the Italian side (see above) – forms from snows collecting between the Aiguille de Tricot and the south-western face of the Aiguille de Bionnassay. The glacier descends in a south-westerly direction for approximately 2.5 km.

== Alpinism ==
=== History ===
The first ascent of the Aiguille de Bionnassay was undertaken on 28 July 1865 by Florence Crauford Grove, Edward N. Buxton and Reginald S. McDonald, with guides Jean Pierre Cachat and Michel Payot. They ascended the north-west face to reach the ridge above the Aiguille de Tricot, from where they continued to the knife-edged summit ridge, arriving in a thunderstorm. A detailed account is given below.

The mountain's south ridge was first climbed on 13 July 1888 by Kaspar Maurer, Andreas Jaun and the Austrian diplomat Georg Gruber.

The east ridge was first climbed in descent as part of a traverse from the Dômes de Miage by Katharine Richardson, Émile Rey and Jean-Baptiste Bich on 13 August 1888.

The long west ridge was first climbed in its entirety from the Col de Tricot in 1911 by Fraulein Eleonore Hasenclever and Freulein H. Wirthl with M. Helff, K.G. von Saar and Richard Weitzenbock.

The complete north-west face route was finally climbed in 1926 by billionaire businessman and art collector, Robert Wylie Lloyd, with his guides Adolf and Josep Pollinger.

The first winter ascent of the Aiguille de Bionnassay was made on 20 March 1929 by A. Charlet, F. Frison Roche, H. Hoerlin, E.Schneider and H. Schroeder.

The north face was first climbed on 30–31 August 1953 by Bertrand Kempf and Claude Laurendeau. It is ranked as one of the most difficult ice walls in the Alps, and is rarely attempted.

=== Routes ===
- North-West Face: Graded at AD, the route is a steep, glaciated face between 40 and 55 degrees. There are numerous small crevasses in its steep slope providing sufficient resting places to reduce the exposure, but it is a long, demanding route of over 1 km, and can be difficult in times of hard ice. Climbers usually start from the Tête Rousse Hut. It is regarded as the finest route on the mountain, and one of the best of its class in the Alps. After snow it is avalanche prone; in one such incident in 1968 four climbers died.
- South Ridge: An ascent from the Col de Miage (Durier Hut) provides the easiest route to the summit. The route consists of snowy ridges, rock ledges and chimneys. It is graded at PD+ with rock pitches of II, often iced. A final steep snow ridge leads to the narrow and exposed summit on the French/Italian border.
- East Ridge: Described as "a superb snow crest which is often precarious and delicate due to large cornices", the east ridge descends from the summit as an exposed and delicate knife-edge crest to the col de Bionnassay. It is graded AD and can be reached from a traverse of the Bionnassay, or from the Gonella Hut.
- West Ridge: A long 3.4 km ascent from the Col du Tricot over the Aigulle du Tricot, graded at PD.
- Traverse: Crossing the mountain as part of a three-day ascent of Mont Blanc involves climbing up the south ridge of the Aiguille de Bionnassay from the Col de Miage, then descending from the summit down its razor-sharp, icy, and often corniced east (frontier) ridge. From there the route climbs again up the west ridge of the Dome du Gouter, past the Vallot Hut, to reach the Bosses ridge and thence to the summit of Mont Blanc. The route has been described as 'a truly magical expedition of ice and snow aretes at great altitude'. The Durier Hut on the Col de Miage can either be reached directly from the village of Tresse via an increasingly broken slope of scree in its upper reaches, or via a traverse from the Conscrits Hut over the Dômes de Miage.

== Image gallery ==
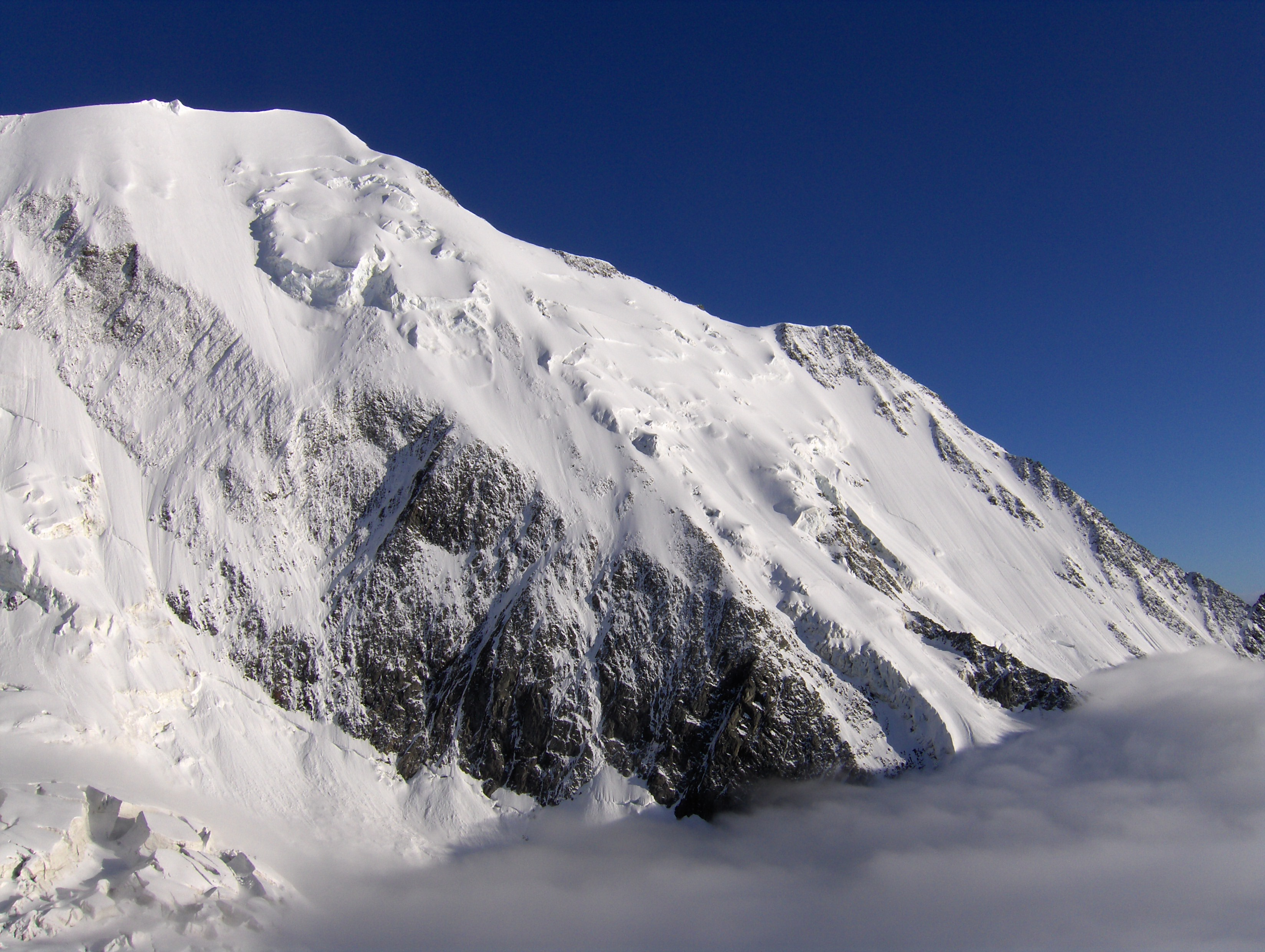
North side of Aiguille de Bionnassay, seen from the Tête Rousse Hut

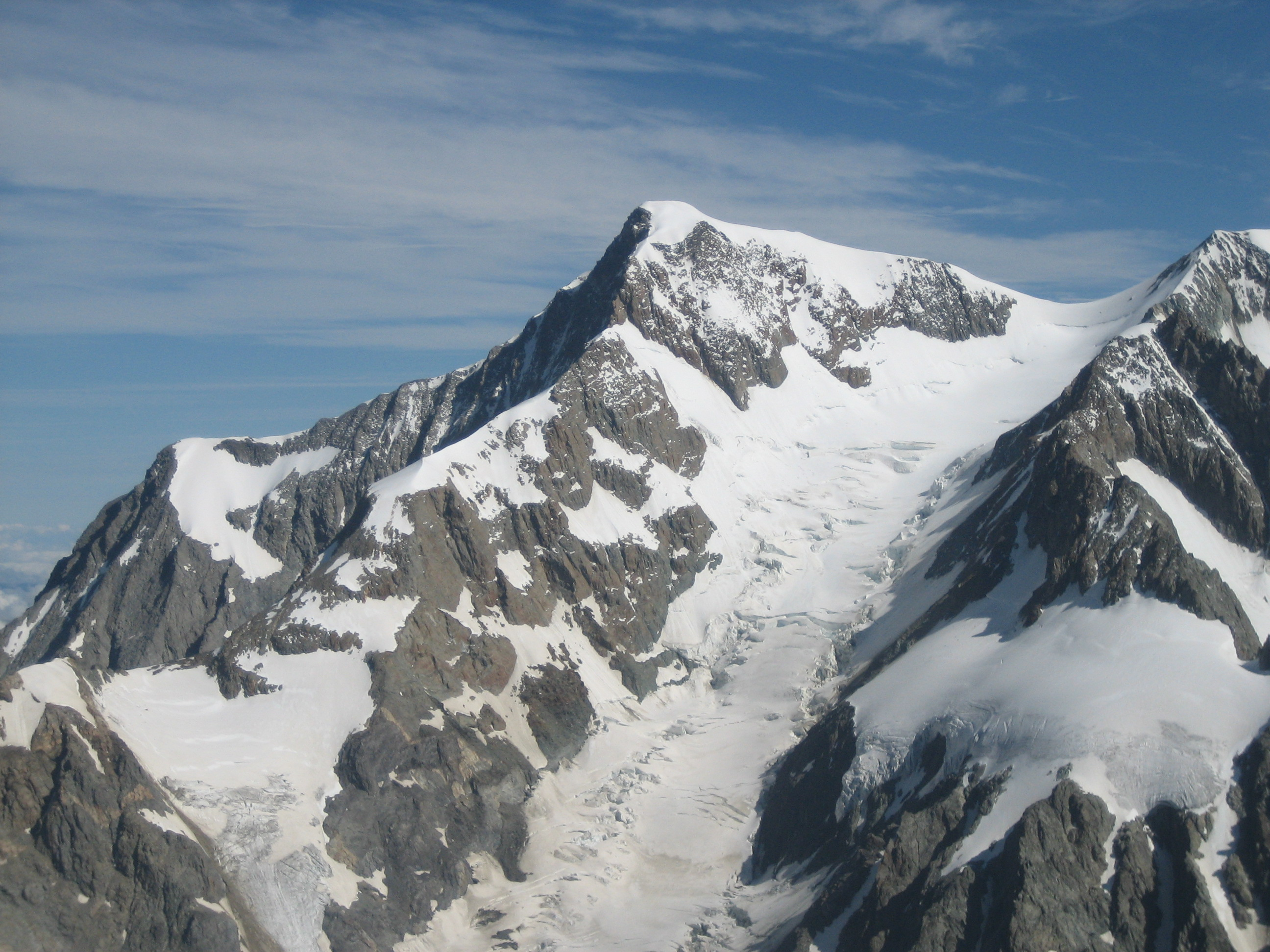
SE side of mountain with Glacier de Bionnassay Italien, S ridge and Aiguille de Tricot

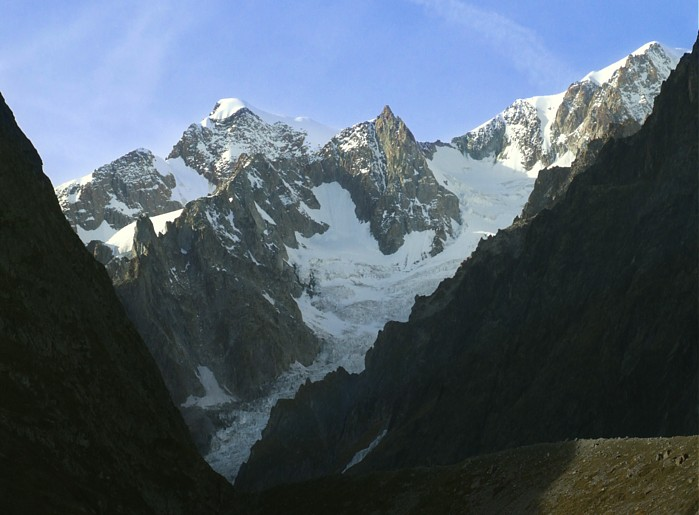
The southern Italian side of the Aiguille de Bionnassay, with Aiguille Grises ridge in front

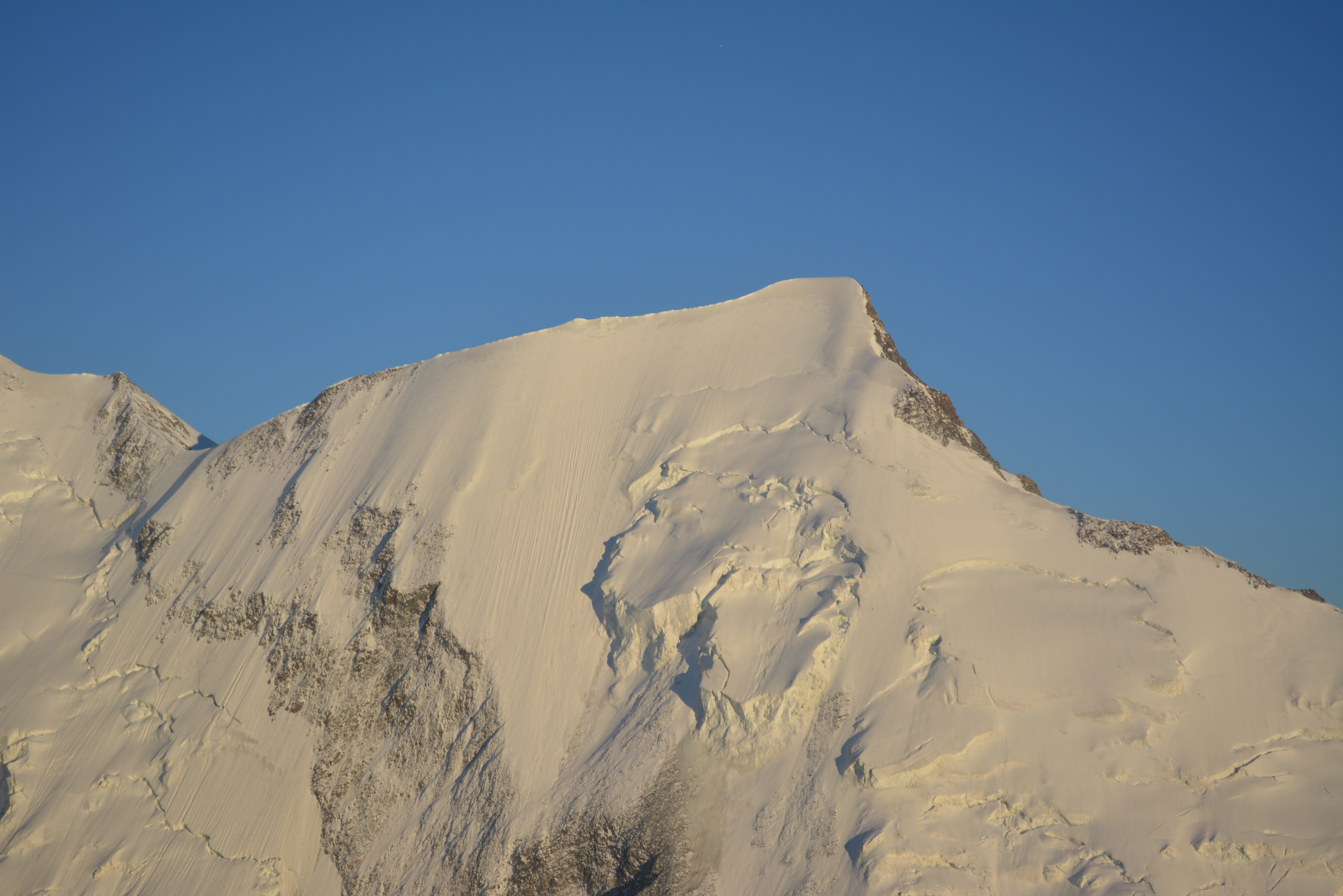
Glacier on NW face of Aiguille de Bionnassay

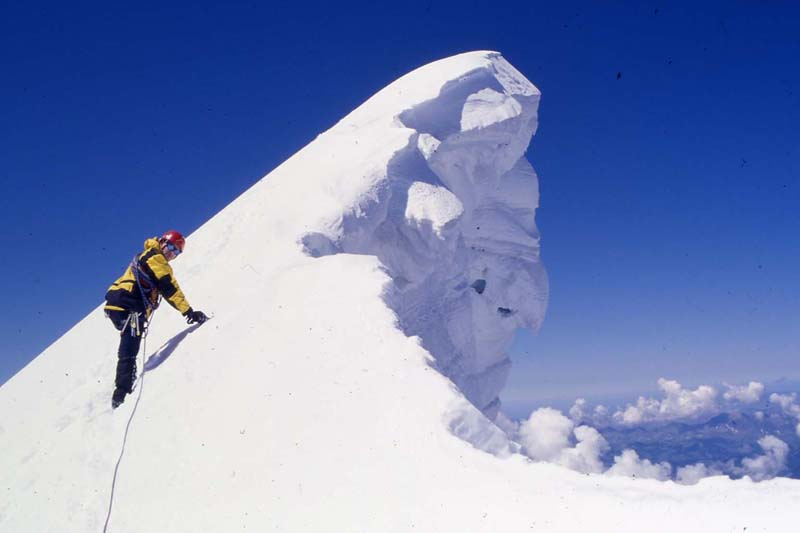
Cornice on the E ridge of the Aiguille de Bionnassay

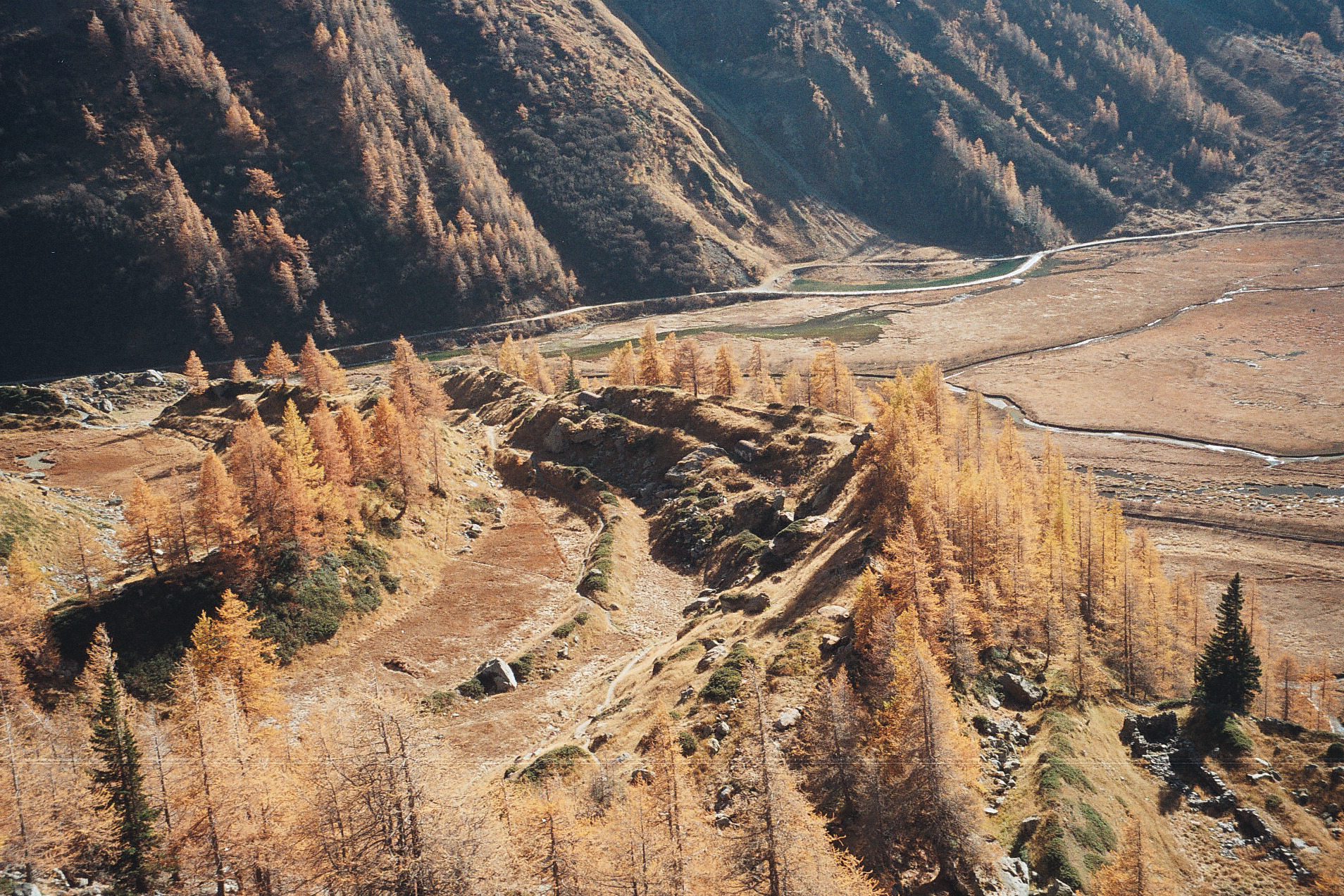
Old moraines at the foot of Glacier du Miage on the Italian side

== See also ==
- List of 4000 metre peaks of the Alps
