= Refuge Mont-Blanc =

Coordinates: 45°48′2″N 6°55′51″E

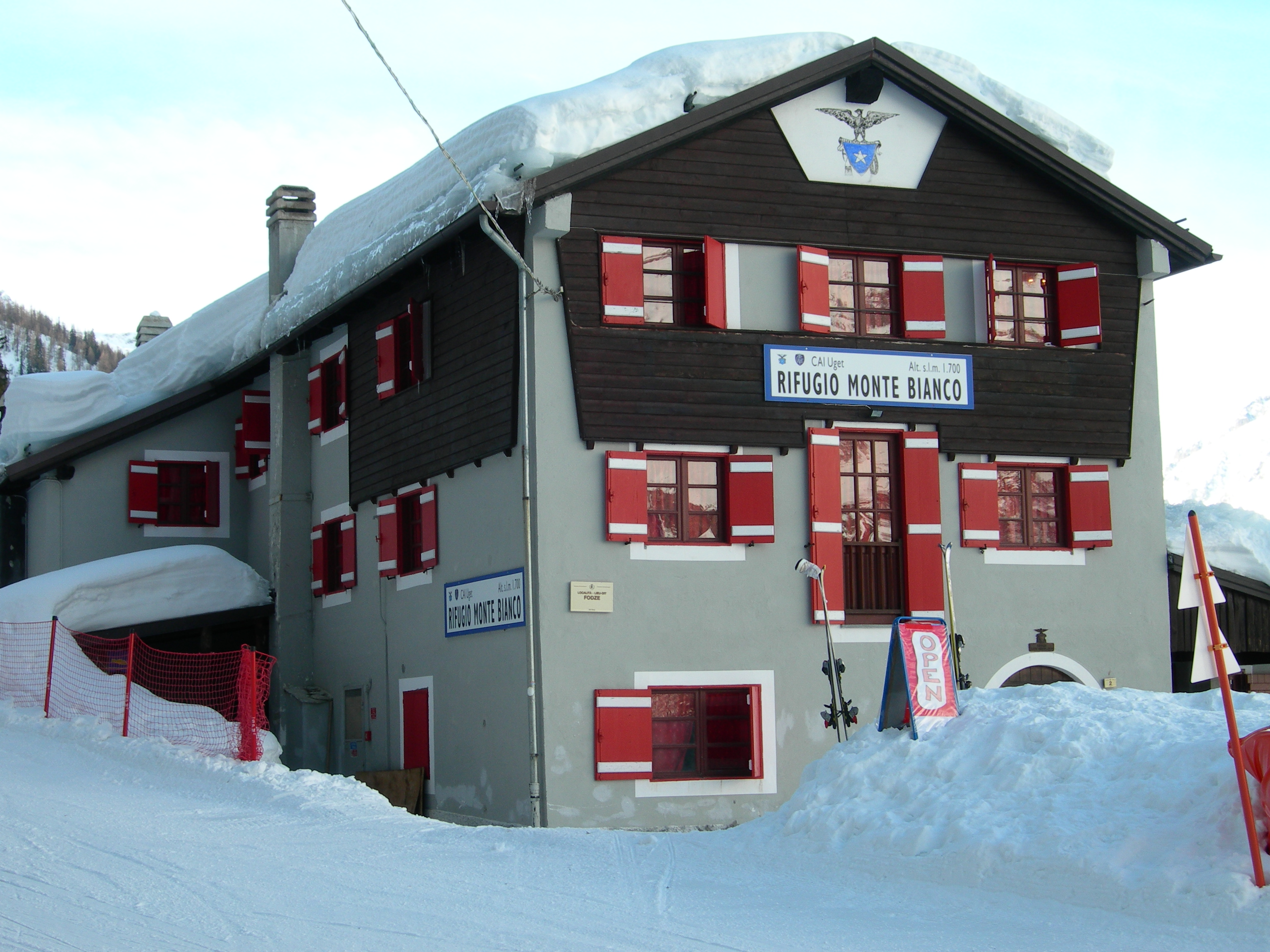
Refuge_Mont-Blanc

Refuge Mont-Blanc (also Rifugio Monte Bianco) is a low-altitude refuge in the Alps in Val Veny, near Courmayeur, Italy. Despite its name, it is not used by climbers attempting to reach the summits of the Mont Blanc massif, but its location close to the valley bottom of Val Veny allows it to accommodate walkers undertaking the Tour du Mont Blanc, or winter skiers using the Courmayeur ski resort. It can be reached by car from Courmayeur.

== Ascents ==
- Mont Chétif - 2343 meters
- Col Checrouit - 1956 meters
- Pre de Pascal - 1912 meters
