= Notre Dame de Guérison sanctuary =

Christian sanctuary situated in Courmayeur

Notre-Dame-de-Guérison
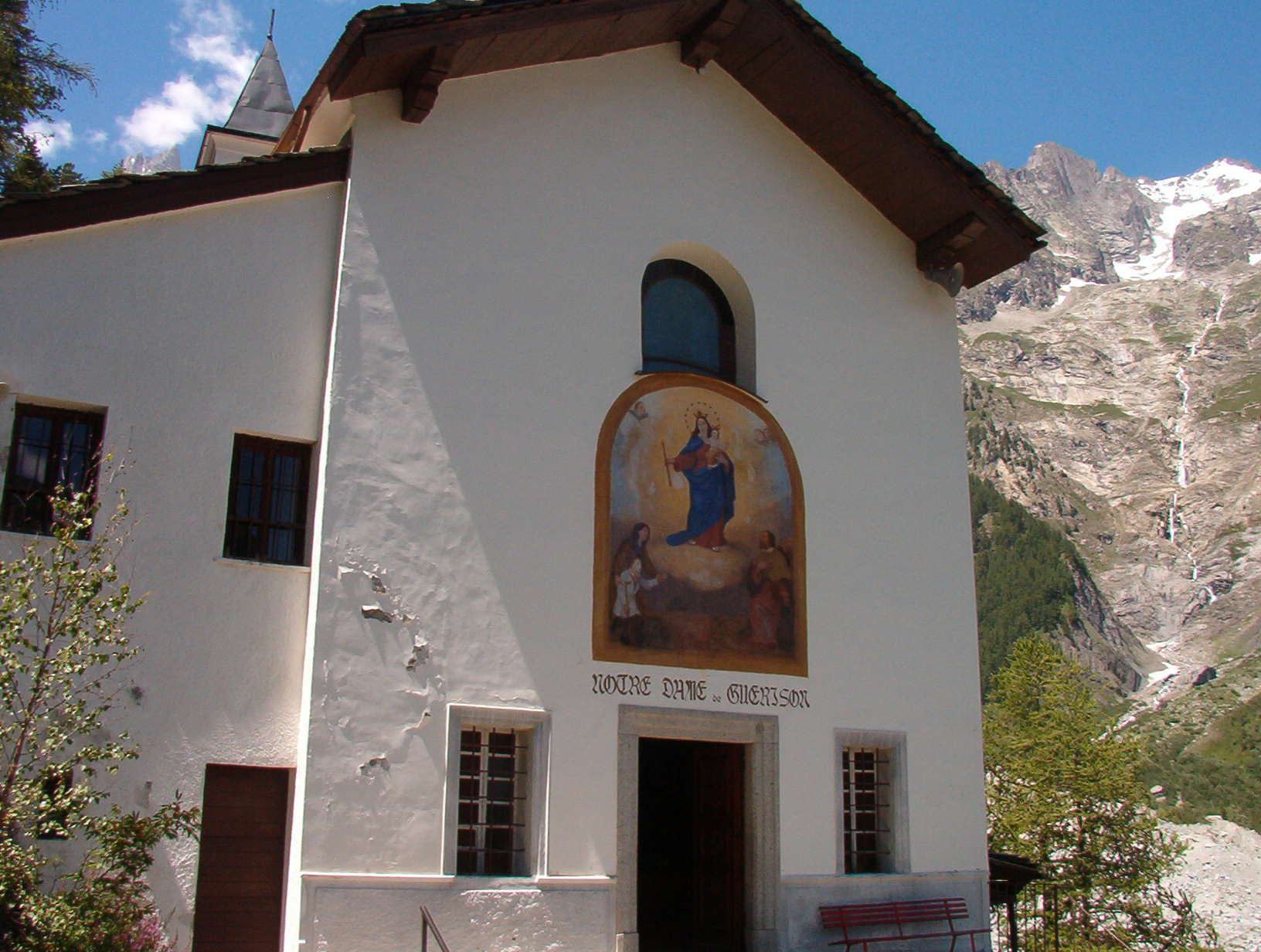
- Notre-Dame-de-Guérison
- 45°48′49″N 6°56′52″E
- Location: Val Vény, Courmayeur
- Country: Italy
- Denomination: Roman Catholic

History
- Status: Sanctuary

Architecture
- Functional status: Active
- Completed: 1868

Administration
- Province: Aosta Valley
- Diocese: Rieti

Notre-Dame-de-Guérison (French for "Our Lady the Healer") is a Christian sanctuary situated in Courmayeur, at the foot of Mont Chétif, along the Val Veny road that leads to the Seigne pass, used by the Romans to reach Gaul. It is well-known both in Italy and abroad, not only because of the surrounding landscape, but because it is very easy to reach by car from May to November and above all, is situated very close to an internationally famous tourist resort.

== History ==
The first exact dates regarding the place go back to 8 May 1537 when the name "Berrier", the name by which the chapel that once stood here was called, appears in a donation document. This word has Celtic origins and means “a pile of large rocks”. Around 1690 a statue of the Virgin was placed in a protective niche there, and named La Croix du Berrier ("the Berrier's Cross"). In 1781, a man from Courmayeur, Jean-Michel Truchet, proposed to the priest Jean-Martin Dondeynaz to build a chapel where the statue stood. This project was approved by Aosta's Bishop Pierre-François de Sales, and the building process began in 1782. The chapel was demolished by the Brenva Glacier in 1800, and immediately rebuilt. In the second half of the 19th century, the quantity of pilgrims pushed the Courmayeur parish to build a sanctuary, which was finished and blessed in 1868.

== The present ==
The arches and walls of the sanctuary are covered with a cycle of frescoes and three oils on canvas by the painter Giuseppe Stornone from Ivrea (1816-1890), who specialized in religious paintings of large dimension as well as vast cycles of frescoes and was influenced by the Italian baroque style.

Many of the votive offerings are for alpinists who have escaped danger while climbing Mont Blanc or crossing many of its passes. Pope John-Paul II and Pope Benedict XVI, during their summer holidays in Aosta Valley, visited the sanctuary on many occasions.
