= Brenva Glacier =

Glacier located on the southern side of the Mont Blanc massif

- Aerial view of the Brenva Glacier, September 2026

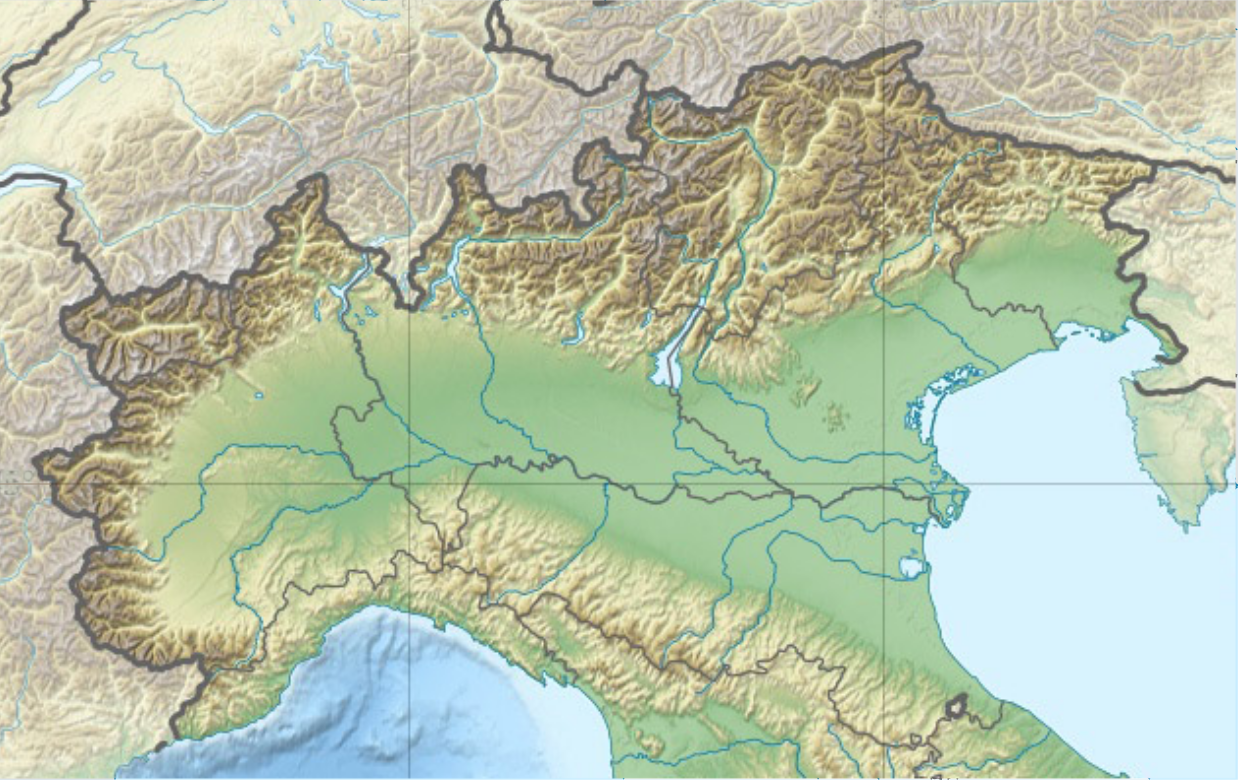
- Location within Alps Location within Northern Italy
- Interactive map of Brenva Glacier
- Location: Northern slopes of the Mont Blanc massif
- Coordinates: 45°49′43″N 6°53′56″E
- Area: 7 square kilometres (2.7 sq mi)
- Length: 6.7 km (4.2 mi)

The Brenva Glacier (French: Glacier de la Brenva, Italian: Ghiacciaio della Brenva) is a valley glacier, located on the southern side of the Mont Blanc massif in the Alps. It is the second longest and eighth largest glacier in Italy, and descends down into Val Veny, close to Entrèves, near Courmayeur. Over the centuries it has experienced a number of major rock avalanches which have shaped the glacier and influenced its movement.

== Description ==
The upper accumulation zones of the Brenva Glacier are enclosed by the Aiguille Noire de Peuterey, the Aiguille Blanche de Peuterey, Mont Blanc de Courmayeur, Mont Blanc, Mont Maudit, the Brenva Arête, the Tour Ronde, and the Aiguille de la Brenva.

The Brenva Glacier is formed from three branches, and descends steeply in a south-easterly direction, passing through a narrow neck (known as the Pierre à Moulin) at 2,460 to 2,550 metres (8,070 to 8,370 ft) above sea level (asl), and then falls sharply as a serac field, before reforming as a broad rock-covered glacial tongue. Since 2004, the lower section below the serac field has become completely separated from the upper section, resulting in the active front of the glacier now being at 2,350 m (7,710 ft) asl – some 1,000 metres (3,300 ft) higher than it was previously.

As at 1989, the Brenva Glacier had a maximum length of 7.64 km (4.75 mi), and an area of 8.06 km^{2} (3.11 sq mi), making it the eighth largest in Italy by area. Like most alpine glaciers, it has been retreating since that time, and is now approximately 6.7 km (4.2 mi) in length, but still remains the second longest. It has an area of approximately 7 km^{2} (2.7 sq mi) and, in its upper region, the glacier has a recorded speed of flow of 180 metres (590 ft) per year.

== Rockfall and glacial advance ==
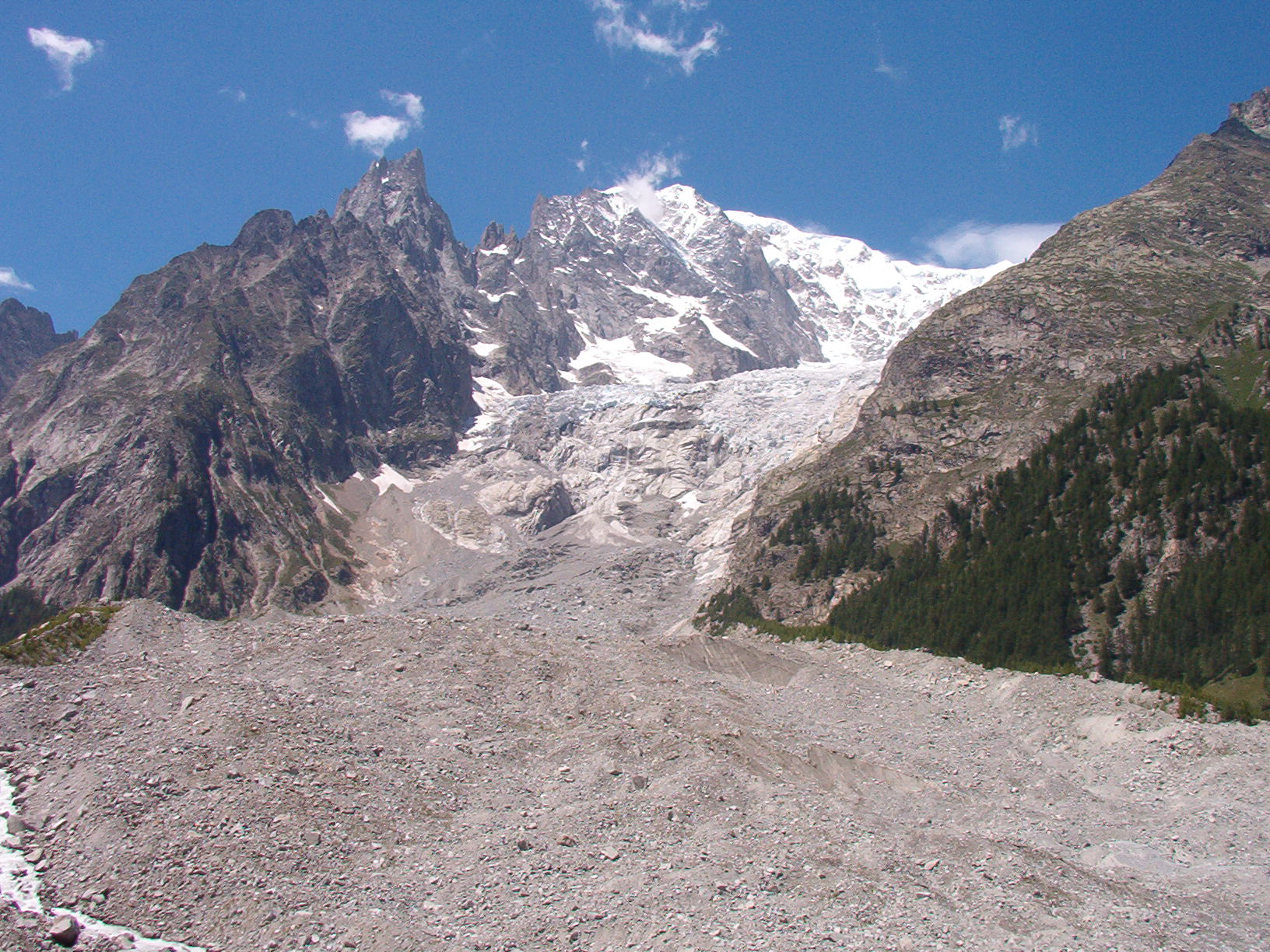
View up the Brenva Glacier in July 2004, showing lower section completely covered with rock debris

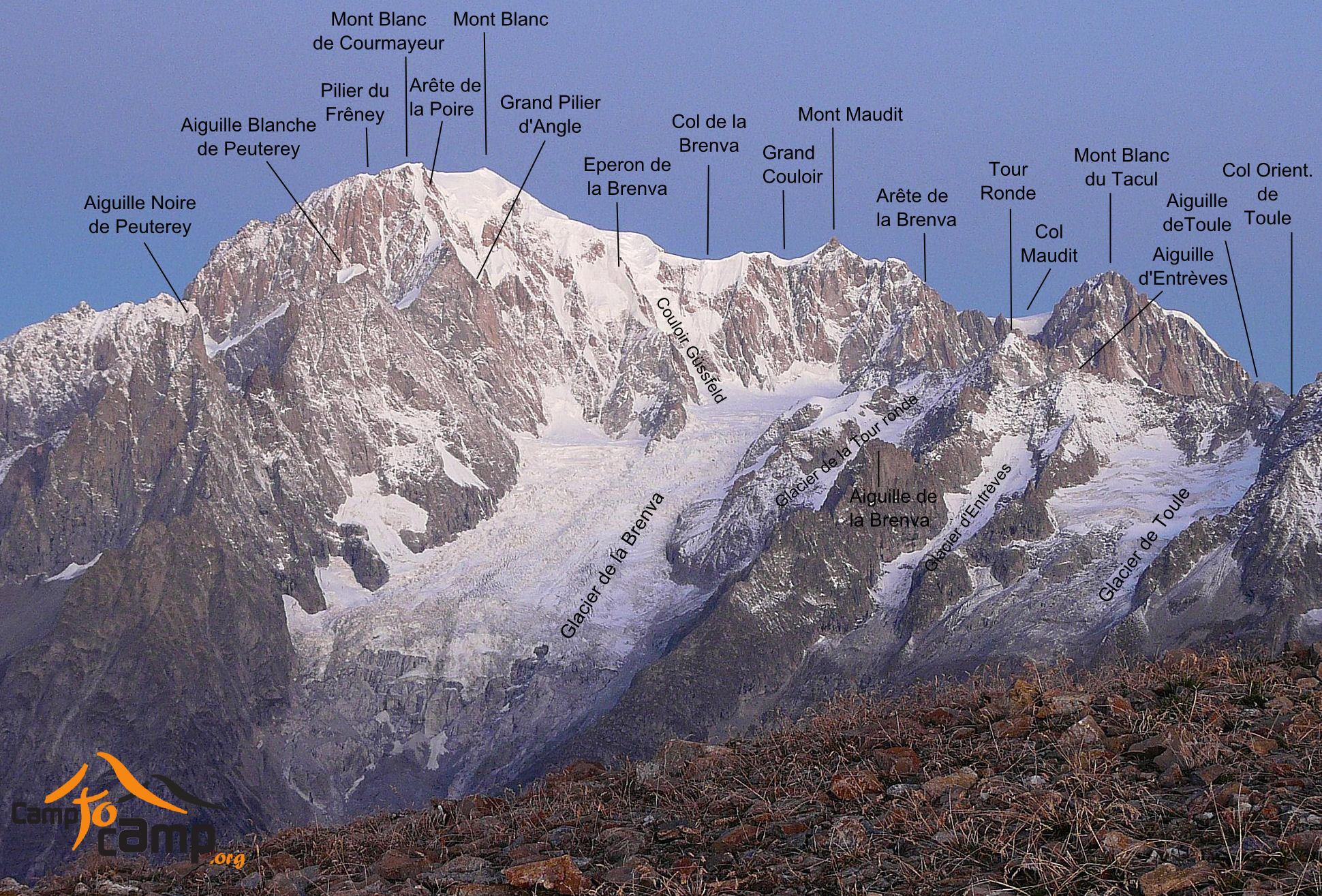
Mont Blanc - South-East side

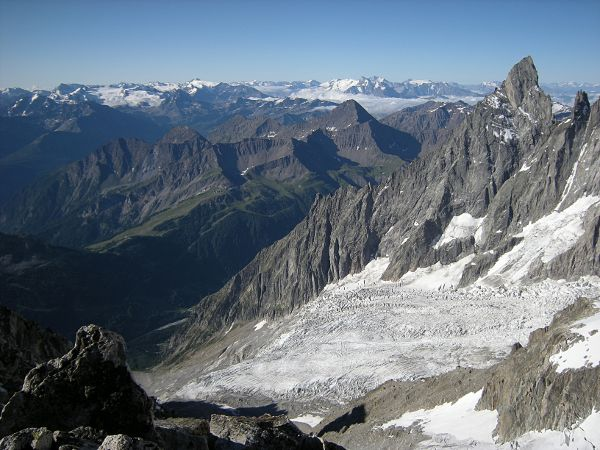
Brenva Glacier with Aiguille Noire de Peuterey (right). Viewed from the Tour Ronde, July 2011.

Minor rockfalls occur very frequently from the steep mountainsides above the Brenva Glacier.

On 18 January 1997 a major rockfall occurred at around 3,725 m (12,221 ft) which initiated an enormous avalanche that travelled 5.5 km (3.4 mi) horizontally, descending over 2,285 m (7,497 ft) into the floor of Val Veny. It killed two skiers and built a 25 m (82 ft)-high dam of snow and ice which temporarily blocked the Dora Baltea river, whilst the air blast destroyed mature forest trees and buildings on the opposite side of the valley. The total volume of rock, snow and ice was estimated at four million cubic metres. Further investigation suggested that the avalanche was not caused directly by the rockfall, but through seismic shock causing seracs to collapse which, in turn, then initiated the snow and ice avalanche. The rock avalanche itself has been described as a classic example of a sturzstrom.

The lower section of the Brenva Glacier is covered in rock – the remnants of earlier rockfalls in November 1920 from the east face of the Grand Pilier d'Angle. These were four separate events, consisting of between 2.4 and 3.6 million cubic metres of rock, which then mobilised a further 7.8 to 9.9 million cubic metres of snow and ice. Four additional pre-20th century rockfall events have also been identified on the Brenva Glacier. These occurred in 1767 AD; the early 14th century; between 426 and 615 AD; and between 2750 and 2350 calendar years BP.

Evidence for the glacier's re-advance in the past has been found in the form of ancient logs buried in moraine deposits. These indicate that those moraines themselves had once been exposed and forested, but then subsequently reburied by new moraines during another period of glacial advance.

Retreat of the Brenva Glacier since 1988 has exposed its lateral moraines which served to channel the massive 1997 rock avalanche between them. By contrast, earlier advance of the glacier that has started in 1913 served to raise the ice level above the moraines, thus causing the rock in that avalanche to come to rest outside of the moraines.

The major rockfall events on the Brenva Glacier have deposited so much rock debris that the normal balance between the upper accumulation zone and lower ablation zone has been compromised. For example, the 1920 rock avalanche added so much additional material to the already rock-covered lower zone, that ablation was significantly reduced. This effectively insulated that part of the glacier, resulting in its advance by an extra 490 metres between 1920 and 1941, and at a time when other glaciers nearby were retreating.

== Brenva Bivouac hut ==
Located on a very large rock promontory between the upper branches of the glacier, the Brenva Bivouac (French: Bivouac de la Brenva) is a very small mountain refuge providing bivouac shelter for up to five people. It is at an altitude of approximately 3140 metres above sea level. Open all year round, it is not attended, and is owned by the Italian Alpine Club.

== Access ==
The upper slopes of the Brenva Glacier can be reached via a col below the Tour Ronde, accessed from the Skyway Monte Bianco, but is only suitable for advanced freeride/snowboarders and skiers.

The old tongue of the glacier reaches down low into the Val Veni and is easily reached on foot from Entrèves or Courmayeur. It takes about six hours for alpine climbers to reach the Brenva Bivouac from Courmayeur.

== See also ==
- Portal:Alps
