= Pré-Saint-Didier =

Pré-Saint-Didier Pré-Sèn-Lédjé (Valdôtain)
- Comune
- Comune di Pré-Saint-Didier; Commune de Pré-Saint-Didier
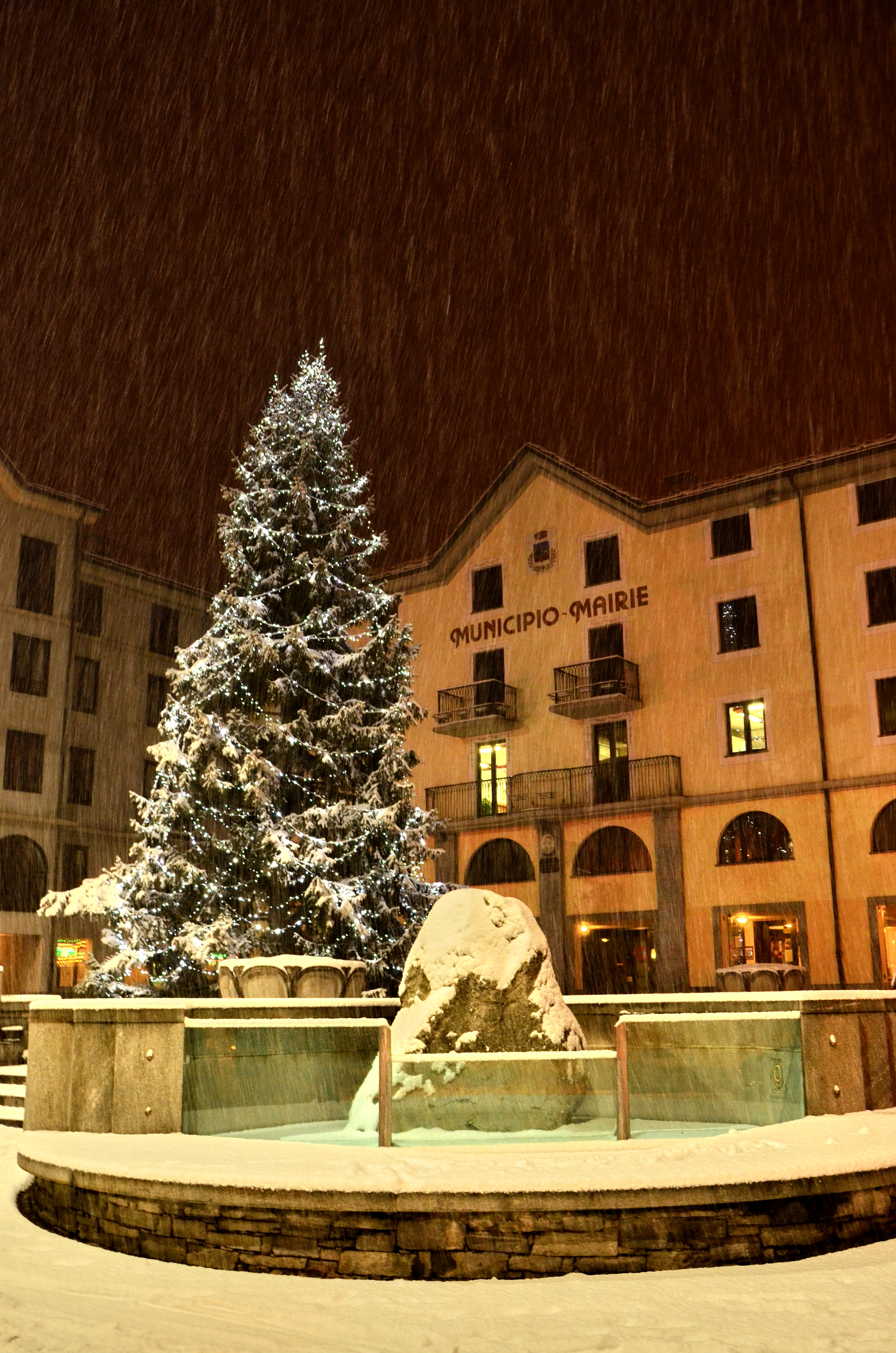
- The Pré-Saint-Didier town hall

- Location within Italy Location within Aosta Valley
- Coordinates: 45°46′N 6°59′E
- Country: Italy
- Region: Aosta Valley
- Province: none
- Frazioni: Champex, Élévaz, La Balme, Palleusieux, Torrent, Verrand, Revers

Area
  - Total: 34 km^{2} (13 sq mi)
- Elevation: 1,004 m (3,294 ft)

Population (31 December 2022)
  - Total: 980
  - Density: 29/km^{2} (75/sq mi)
- Demonym: Saint-didierins
- Time zone: UTC+1 (CET)
  - Summer (DST): UTC+2 (CEST)
- Postal code: 11010
- Dialing code: 0165
- Patron saint: Saint Lawrence
- Saint day: 10 August
- Website: Official website

Pré-Saint-Didier (French: [pʁe sɛ̃ didje]; Valdôtain: Pré-Sèn-Lédjé) is a town and comune in the Aosta Valley region of north-western Italy, at 1,004 metres (3,294 ft) above sea level.

== Transportation ==
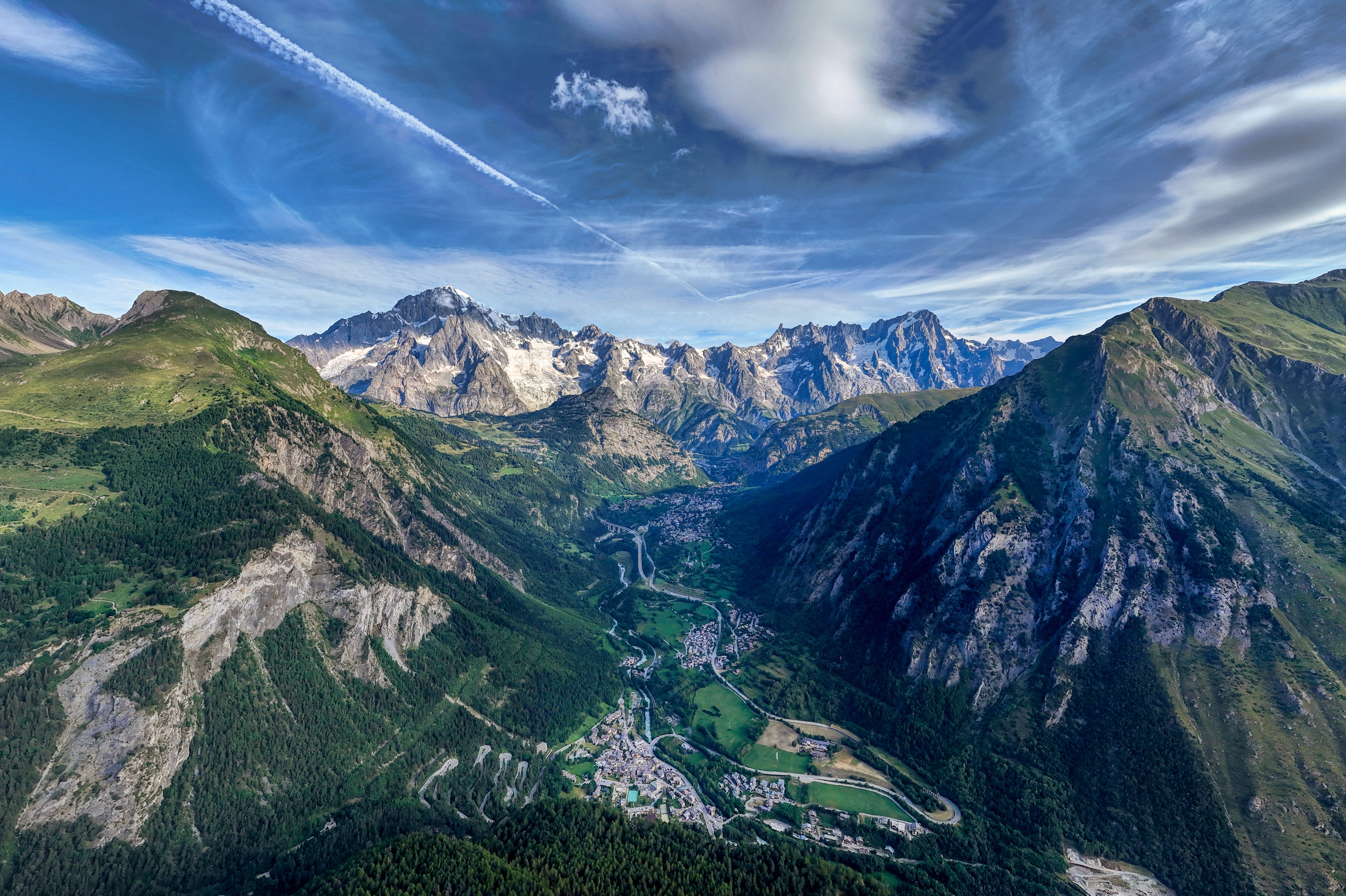
View over the Mont Blanc and the upper Valdigne, the valley where Pré-Saint-Didier is located

The terminus of the regional railway line from Aosta is located in Pré-Saint-Didier, although with no services since 2015. Before closure there were direct trains connecting the town to Aosta, which is connected to the rest of the Italian network. Regular bus connection to places located further up the mountains (La Thuile, Courmayeur) is available.
