= Quintino Sella Hut (Mont Blanc) =

Bivouac hut in the Mont Blanc massif

Coordinates: 45°49′14″N 6°50′38″E

The Quintino Sella Hut (French: Refuge Quintino Sella) is a very remote bivouac hut in the Mont Blanc massif of the Alps in Aosta Valley, Italy. Built in 1885, it is perched on rocks on the south-western flank of the Rocher du Mont Blanc at an altitude of 3,396 m. It is owned by the CAI and can accommodate up to sixteen people with bunk and blankets provided, but no stove or warden.

== Access ==
The hut is amongst the most challenging of the alpine refuges to reach in the Mont Blanc massif, with two approach possibilities.

- From Val Veni, first up the Miage glacier and then steeply up the Mont Blanc glacier towards the Rocher du Mont Blanc. Time to reach hut: 6½-7½ hours, grade AD-.
- An alternative route (when the Mont Blanc glacier is badly crevassed) goes from the Gonella Hut, taking a couloir that climbs directly towards the rock crest near the Quintono Sella Hut, but is exposed to stonefall and only recommended with good snow cover and after a frosty night. Time from hut to hut: 2½-3 hours, grade PD+.

== Ascents ==
The bivouac hut provides access for climbers to the Miage face of Mont Blanc, including the Brouillard Ridge and the Tournette Spur.
