= Elisabetta Hut =

Coordinates: 45°46′1″N 6°50′15″E

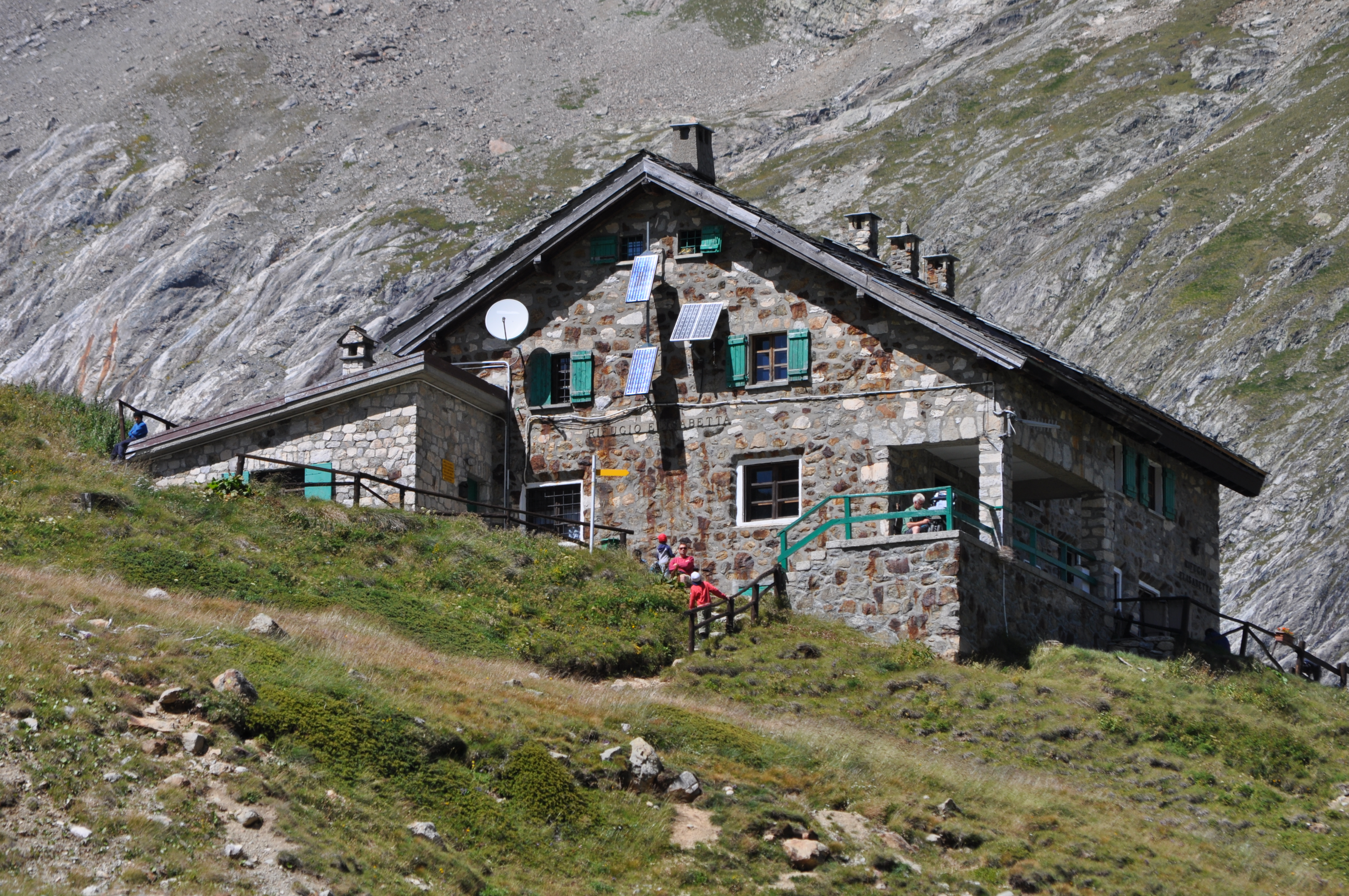
Rifugio Elisabetta Soldini Montanaro

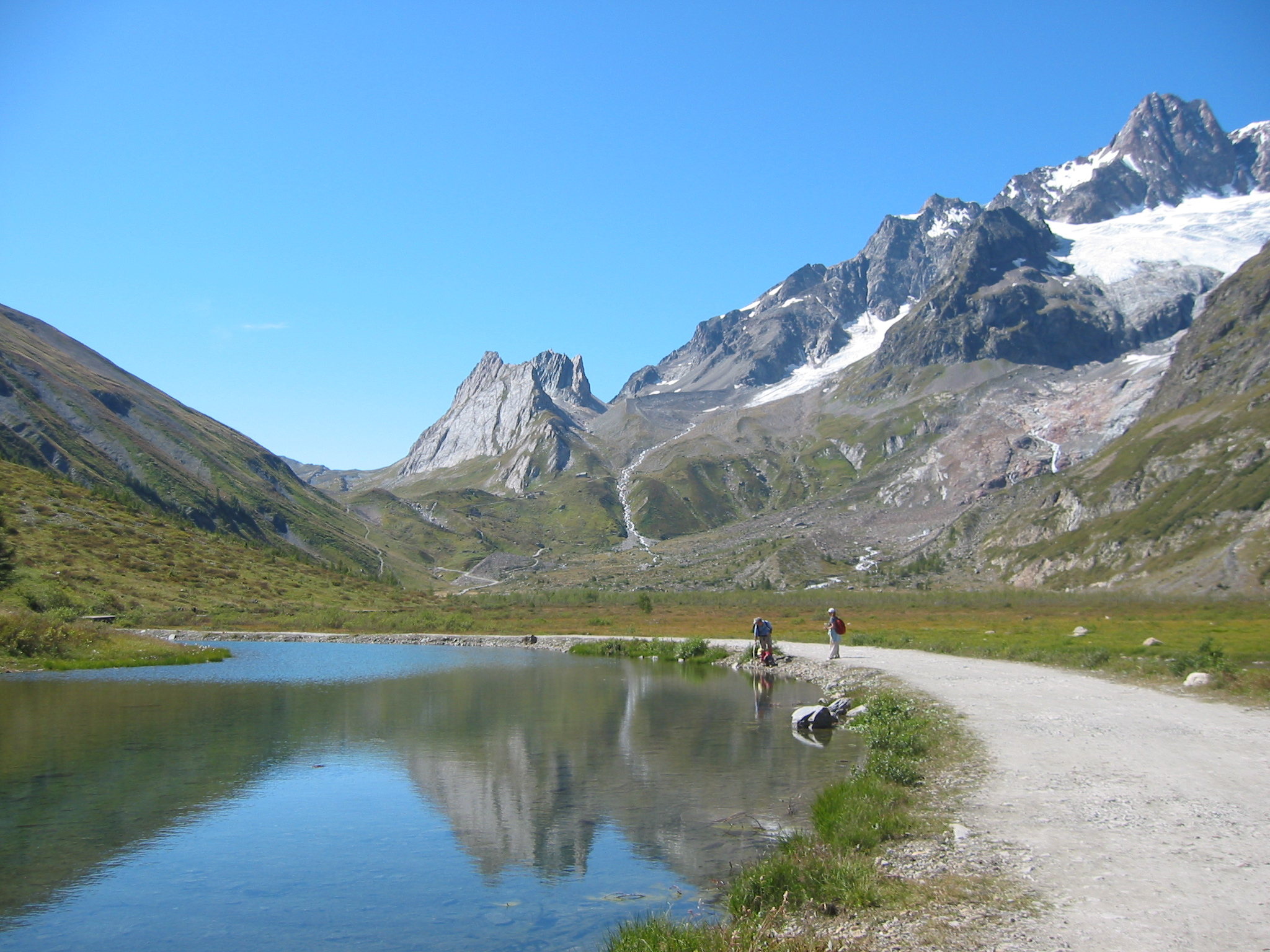
View towards Col de la Seigne, Val Veny, with location of Rifugio Elisabetta highlighted in expanded view.

The Elisabetta Hut (Italian: Rifugio Elisabetta; French: Refuge Élisabeth) is a refuge in the Italian Alps at an altitude of 2,195 m, on the Tour du Mont Blanc. It is located 3 km north-east of the Col de la Seigne, at the south-west end of the Mont Blanc massif, and provides good views of Mont Blanc and the Aiguille Noire de Peuterey. Because of its popularity, plus the fact that there are no other huts along this part of the Tour du Mont Blanc, walkers are advised to book in advance during the peak periods in July and August.

The hut is named after the Italian hiker Elisabetta Soldini Montanaro, who died in an accident in the mountains.
