= Entrèves =

Coordinates: 45°49′N 6°58′E

- Frazione
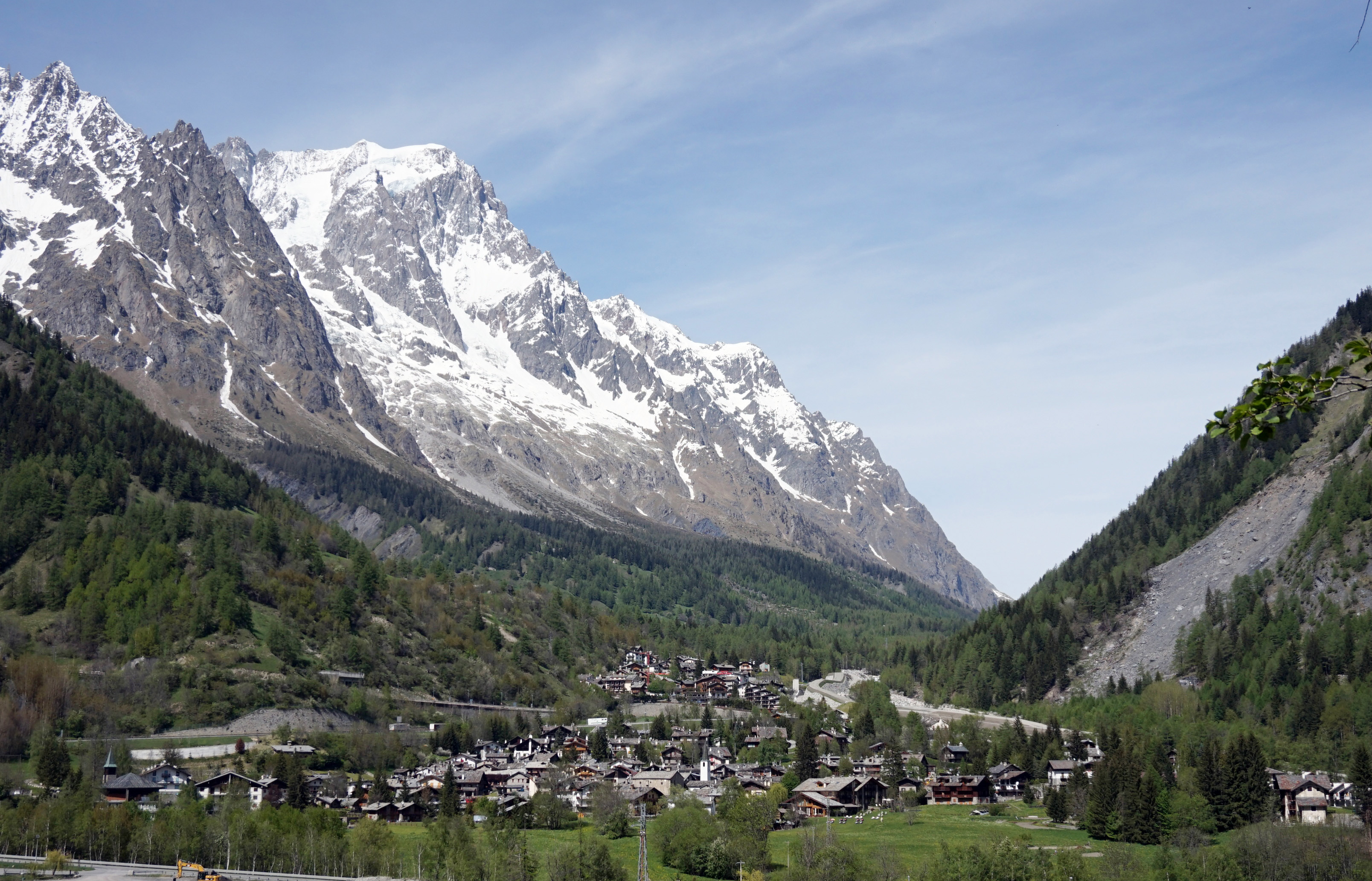
- Interactive map of Entrèves
- Country: Italy
- Region: Aosta Valley
- Time zone: UTC+1 (CET)
  - Summer (DST): UTC+2 (CEST)

Entrèves (Valdôtain: Euntréve or Éntréve) is a frazione (French: hameau) of Courmayeur in the Aosta Valley region of Italy.
