= Durier Hut =

Mountain hut in the Mont Blanc massif

Coordinates: 45°49′31.2″N 6°48′42.6″E

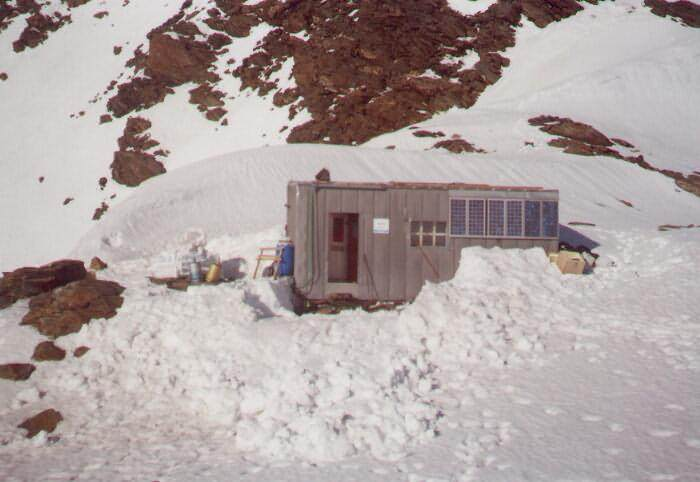
Refuge Durier

The Durier Hut (French: Refuge Durier) is a mountain hut in the Mont Blanc massif of the Alps. It is located in Haute-Savoie department of France on the French/Italian border at an altitude of 3358 m.
