= Miage Glacier =

Glacier in the upper Aosta Valley, in northwestern Italy

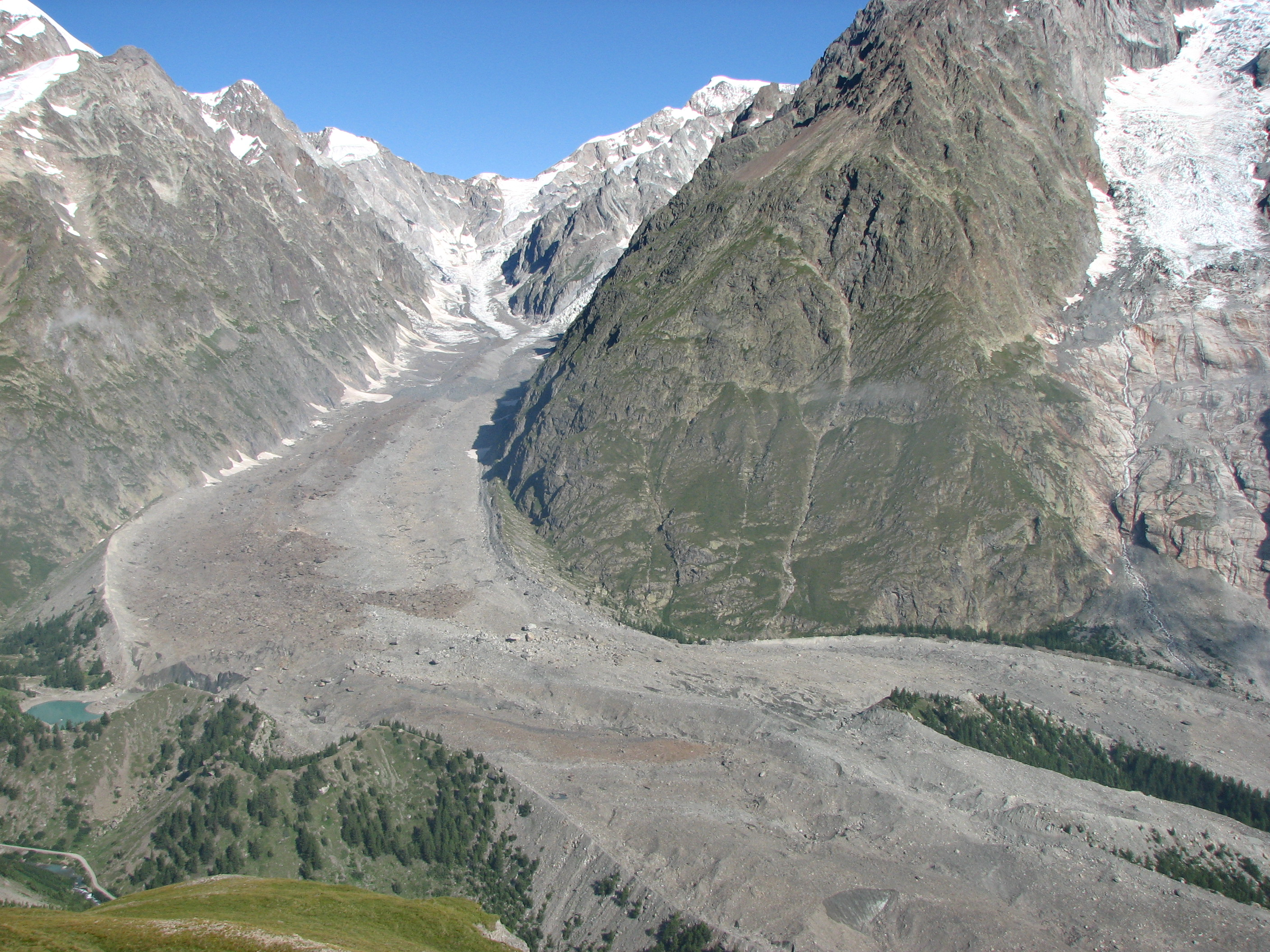
- Debris-covered lower slopes of Miage Glacier in 2009

- Location within Alps Location within Northern Italy
- Interactive map of Miage Glacier
- Location: Southern slopes of the Mont Blanc massif
- Coordinates: 45°48′15″N 6°50′26″E
- Area: 11 square kilometres (4.2 sq mi)
- Length: 10 km (6.2 mi)

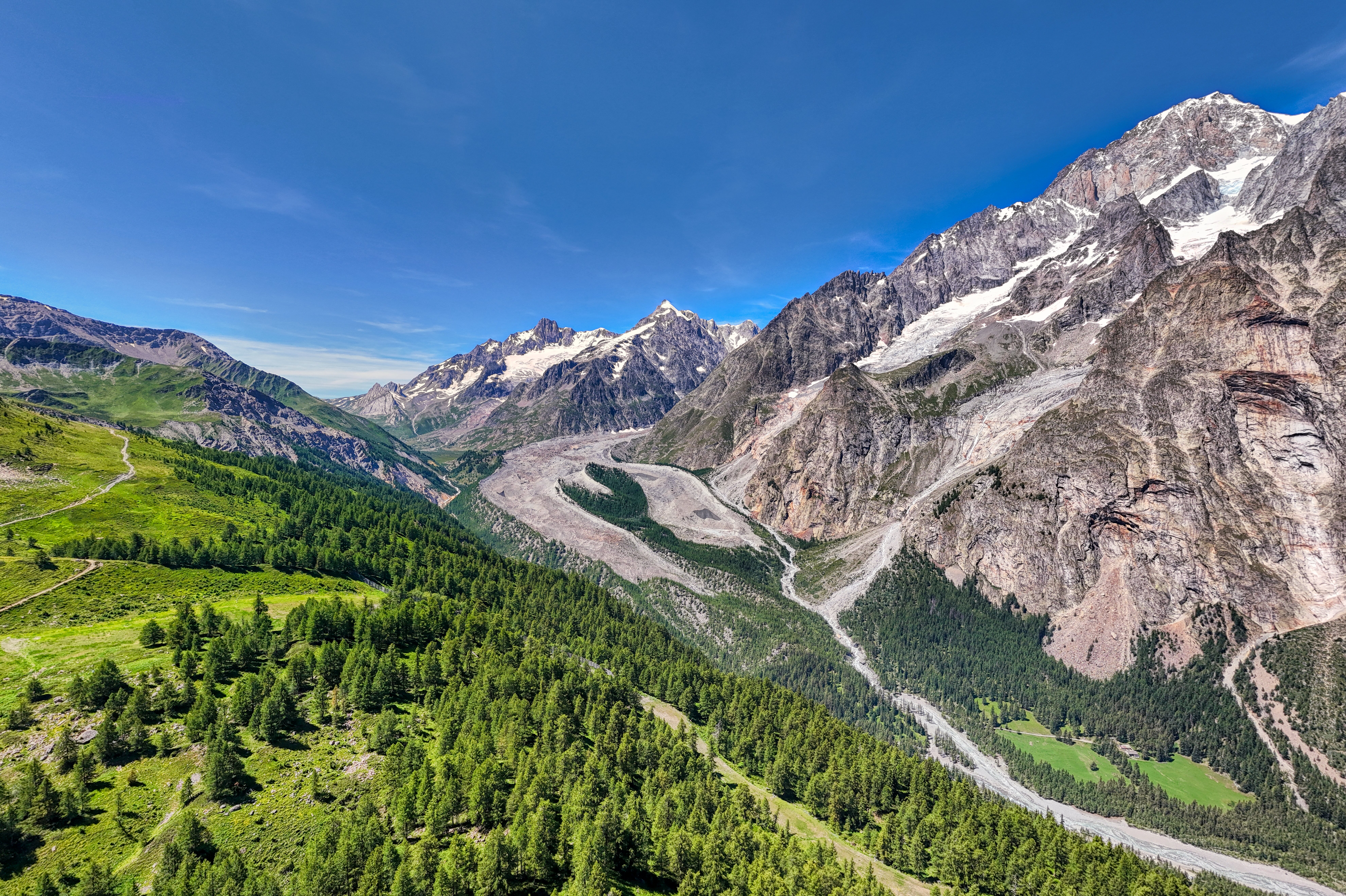
The Miage Glacier and the Val Veny

The Miage Glacier (French: Glacier du Miage; Italian: Ghiacciaio del Miage) is a debris-covered glacier in the upper Aosta Valley, in northwestern Italy.

== Description ==
It is situated on the southwest flank of the Mont Blanc massif, flowing from the Bionnassay Pass (3,892 m (12,769 ft) above sea level) in a generally southerly direction towards Val Veny. Its most northerly arm or tributary is the Glacier de Bionnassay italien, which arises from a cirque between the south eastern side of the Aiguille de Bionnassay, the Col de Bionnassay and the Calotte des Aiguille Grises. This descends for 2.5 km below the Col Infranchissable then turns south-east to merge with other glaciers, thence continuing as the Miage glacier.

At around 10 km (6.2 mi) in length, the Miage Glacier is Italy's longest glacier and also the largest debris-covered glacier in Europe. Approximately 5 km^{2} (1.9 sq mi) of its total area of ~11 km^{2} (4.2 sq mi) is covered in debris originating primarily in rockfall from surrounding walls and avalanching in accumulation areas of its four tributaries. Debris carried along within the glacier is also being exposed at increased rates due to accelerating thinning of the glacier tongue.

The number of sources of supraglacial debris as well as the unusual, mica schist-dominated lithology of the rock walls surrounding the glacier, makes for a varied debris lithology; debris cover becomes continuous at ~2,400 m (7,900 ft) above mean sea level (asl) and remains unbroken to the terminus. Patchy areas can occur, however, where crevasses or moulins occur. Debris thickness generally increases from a few centimetres at 2,400 m (7,900 ft) asl to over 1 metre (3 ft 3 in) at the terminus at ~1,775 m (5,823 ft) asl, although the spatial distribution of thicknesses is heterogeneous especially on parts of the northern terminal lobe.

== Miage Lake ==
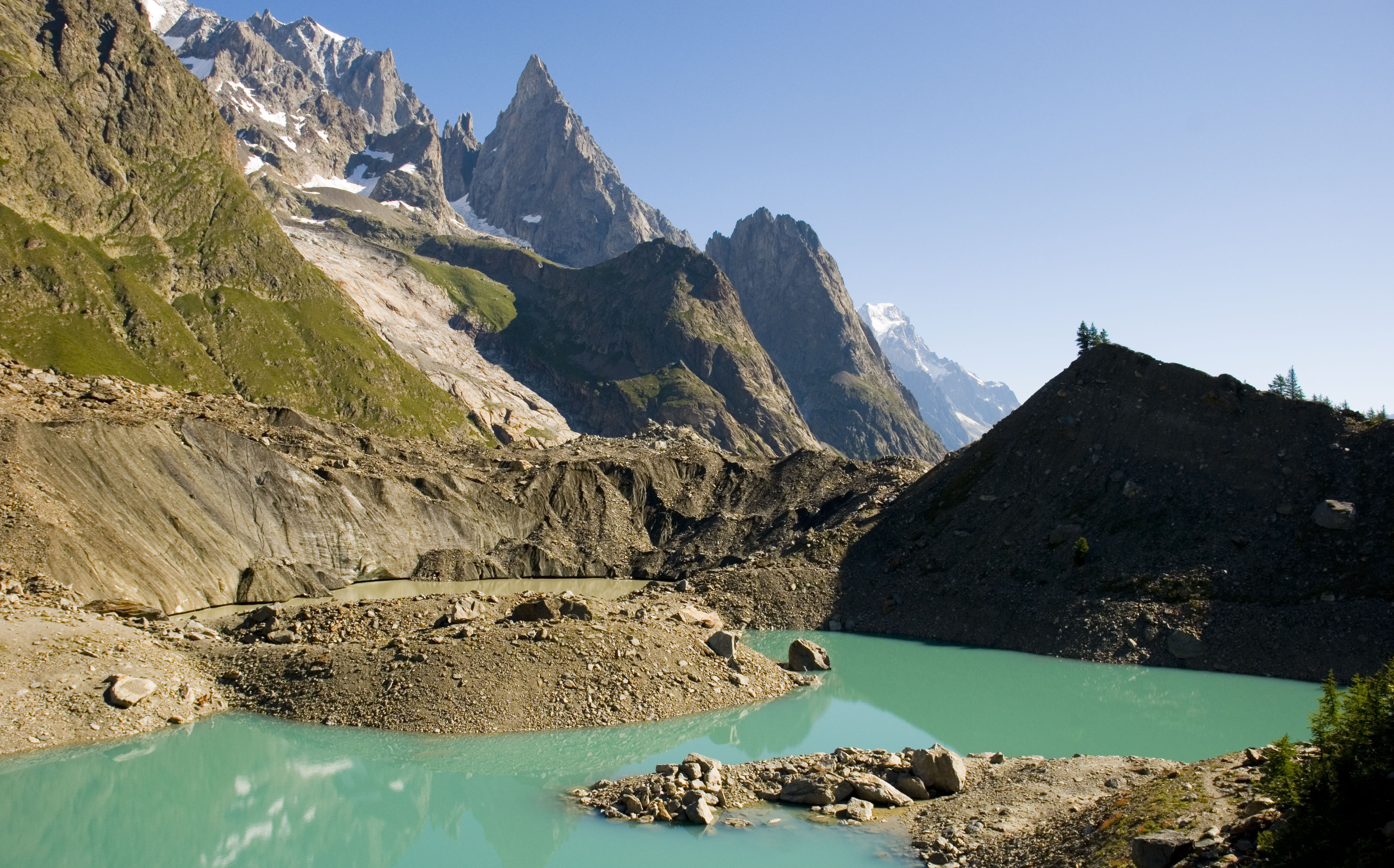
View of Miage Lake from the west, summer 2010

Miage Lake is a proglacial lake near the southern end of the Miage Glacier, located on the outside of the glacier's 90-degree bend eastwards. It is a popular tourist attraction due to the spectacular ice cliffs rising up to one side and its two-coloured appearance. The colours reflect varying sediment concentrations in the water which arise as a result of the filtering effect of the debris.

Huge ice blocks have been known to break off the glacier and fall into the lake, providing another major tourist attraction despite the low chance of such an event occurring. On August 9, 1996, a particularly large block, estimated to have had a volume of 7000-16000m^{3}, fell into the lake causing an abnormally large wave that seriously injured several people. The incident was caught on camera by at least one tourist.
