= Courmayeur =

Courmayeur Croméyeui (Arpitan)
- Comune
- Comune di Courmayeur; Commune de Courmayeur
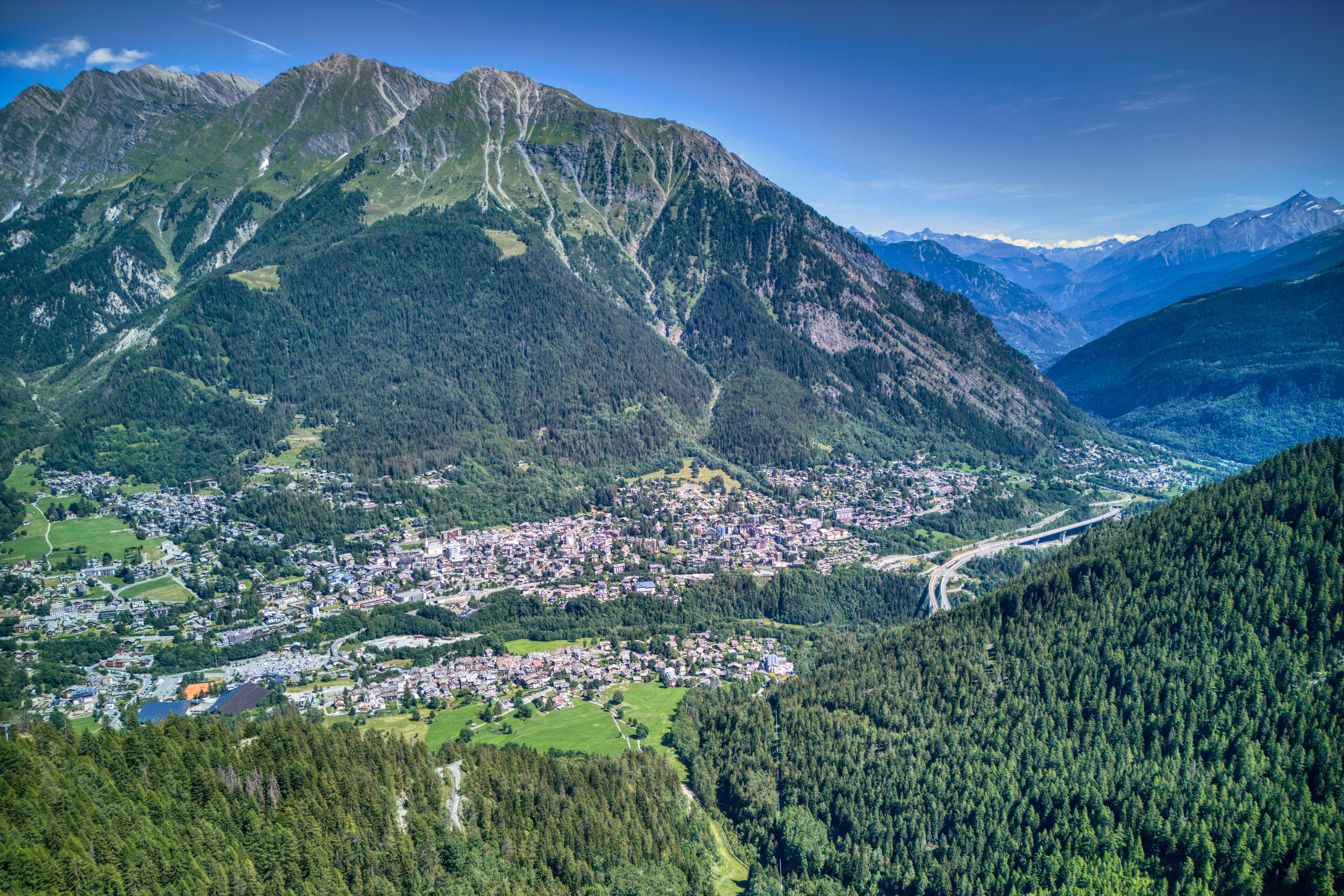
- Courmayeur

- Coat of arms

- Location within Italy Location within Aosta Valley
- Coordinates: 45°47′N 06°58′E
- Country: Italy
- Region: Aosta Valley
- Frazioni: Dolonne, Entrèves, La Palud, Villair-Dessous, Villair-Dessus, Larzey, Entrelevie, La Villette, La Saxe, Pussey

Government
  - Mayor: Stefano Miserocchi (Independent)

Area
  - Total: 210 km^{2} (81 sq mi)
- Highest elevation: 4,810 m (15,780 ft)
- Lowest elevation: 1,224 m (4,016 ft)

Population (31 December 2022)
  - Total: 2,602
  - Density: 12/km^{2} (32/sq mi)
- Demonym: Courmayeureins
- Time zone: UTC+1 (CET)
  - Summer (DST): UTC+2 (CEST)
- Postal code: 11013
- Dialing code: 0165
- Patron saint: St. Pantaleo
- Saint day: July 27
- Website: comune.courmayeur.ao.it

Courmayeur (French: [kuʁmajœʁ], Italian: [kurmaˈjør, -ˈjɛr]; Valdôtain: Croméyeui) is a town and comune in northern Italy, in the autonomous region of Aosta Valley, serving as one of the two bases on either side of Mont Blanc, Europe's highest mountain.

== History ==
The toponym Courmayeur has been mentioned as Curia majori (1233–1381), Corte Maggiore (1620), Cormoyeu (1648), Cormaior (1680), Cormaior (Vissher, 1695), Cormaggior (L'Isle, 1707), Cormaior (Stagnoni, 1772) and Cormaieur (Martinel, 1799). The present toponym was first confirmed by Édouard Aubert (La Vallée d'Aoste, 1860), Joseph-Marie Henry (Histoire populaire de la Vallée d'Aoste, 1929) and Amé Gorret (Guide de la Vallée d'Aoste, 1877).

It became a popular tourist destination when alpinism arose, thanks to its proximity to Mont Blanc.

Under the Fascist regime and its "Italianist" rule, the town was briefly renamed Cormaiore. Courmayeur was reestablished in 1948 alongside all other French toponyms in the Aosta Valley.

The Mont Blanc Tunnel, connecting Courmayeur with Chamonix, opened in 1965, and provides an important road link between Italy and France. Courmayeur serves as one of the entry/exit points of the connecting tunnel and the tunnel forms part of the access between Italy and France, passing underneath Mont Blanc.

In 2013, in accordance with regional law 61 (Dénomination officielle des communes de la Vallée d'Aoste et protection de la toponymie locale), a referendum was carried out to change the official name to Courmayeur-Mont-Blanc, but there was insufficient support.

== Geography ==
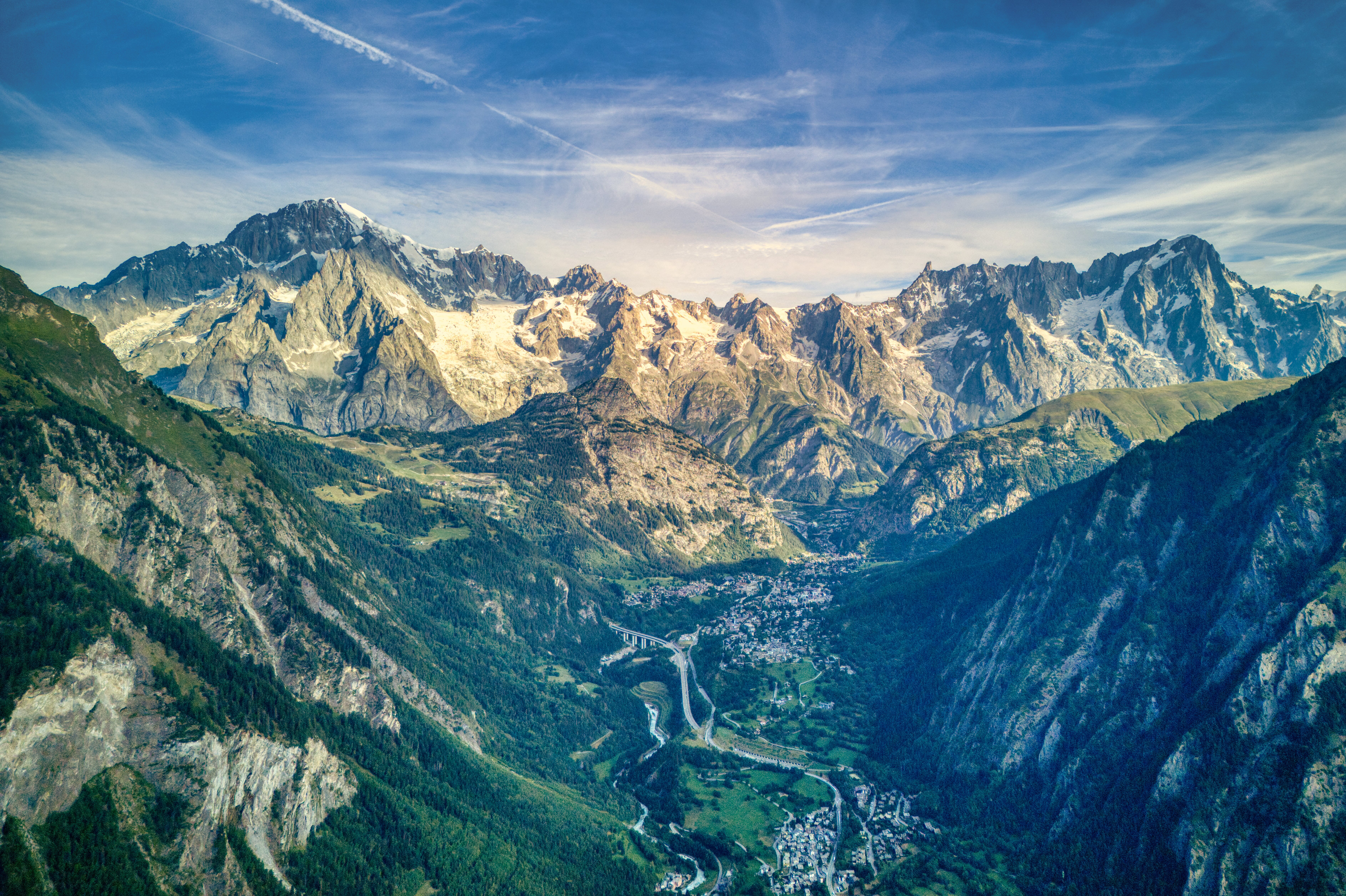
Courmayeur and the Mont Blanc

At an elevation of 1,224 m (4,016 ft) above sea level, it is located at the foot of the southern side of Mont Blanc, at 4,810 m (15,781 ft) the highest point in the Alps and western Europe (see Seven Summits), and is crossed by the Dora Baltea (fr. Doire baltée) river.

Courmayeur shares administration of Mont Blanc with its neighboring municipality of Saint-Gervais-les-Bains in France, and is consequently able to claim the title of highest commune in Italy.

Courmayeur also shares access to the glacial ski run of the Vallée Blanche with another French town, Chamonix, which sits at the opposite, northern, side of the Mont Blanc massif.

== Main sights ==
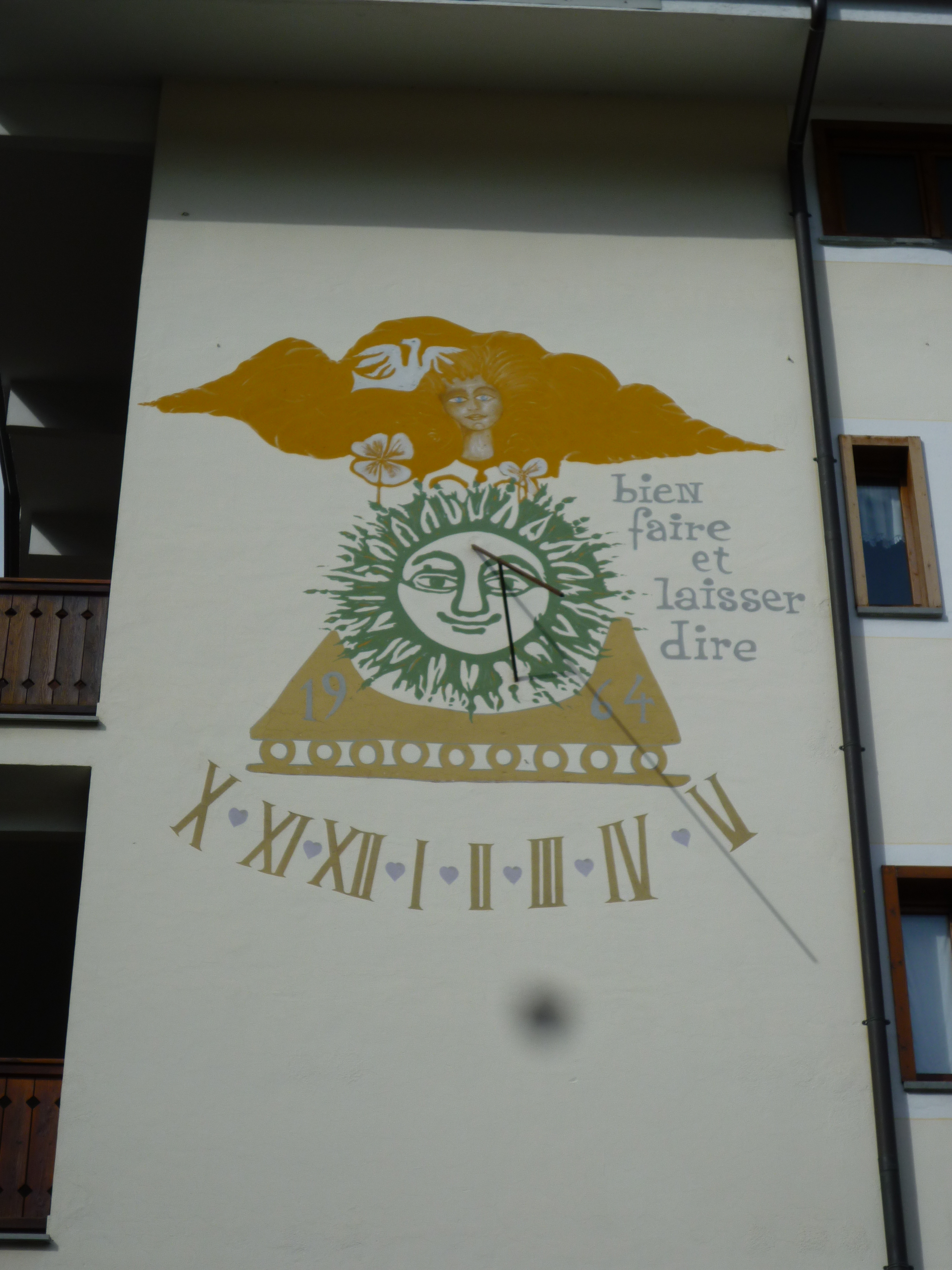
Sundial

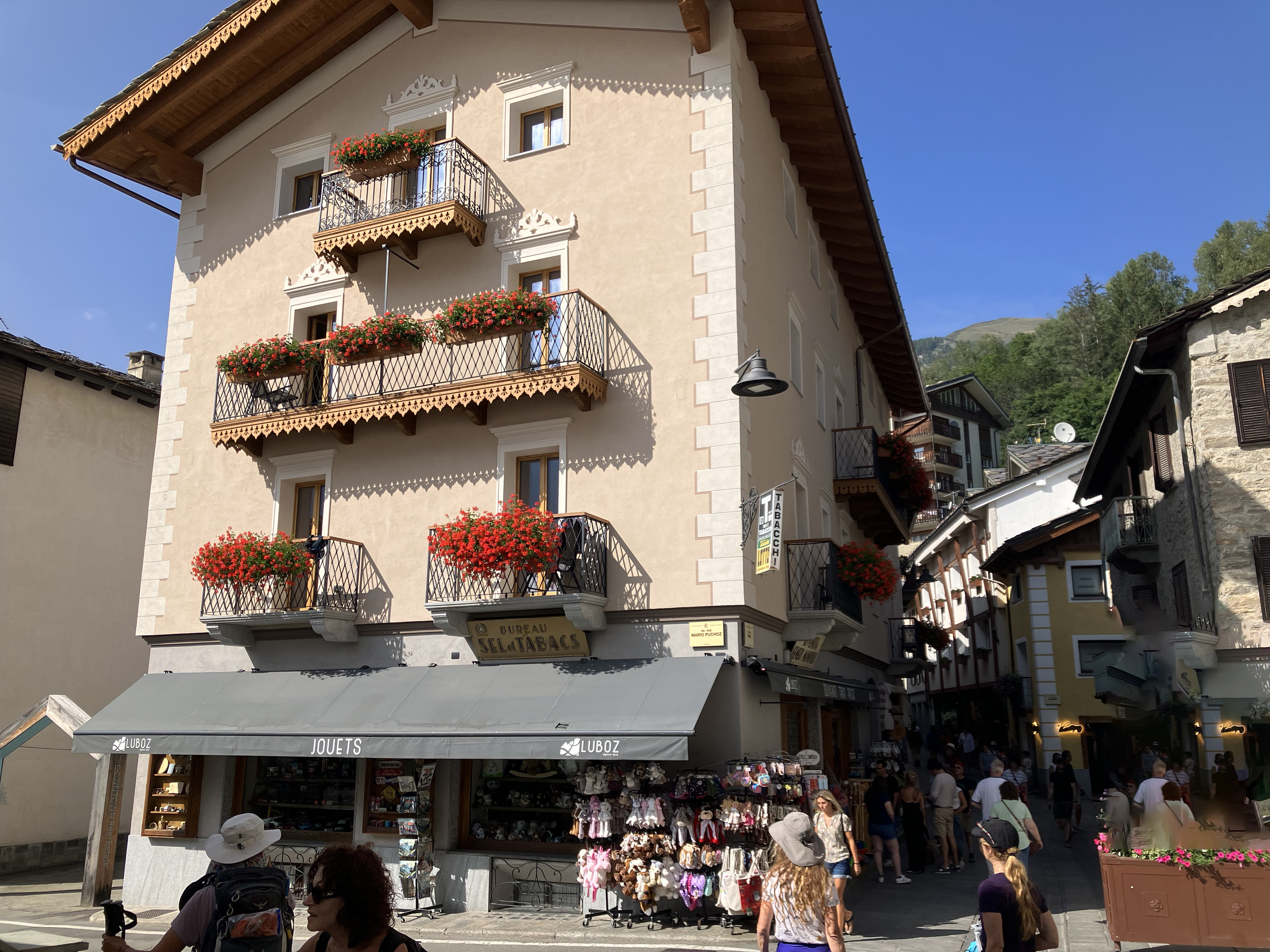
Crossroads between Puchoz St and Rome St.

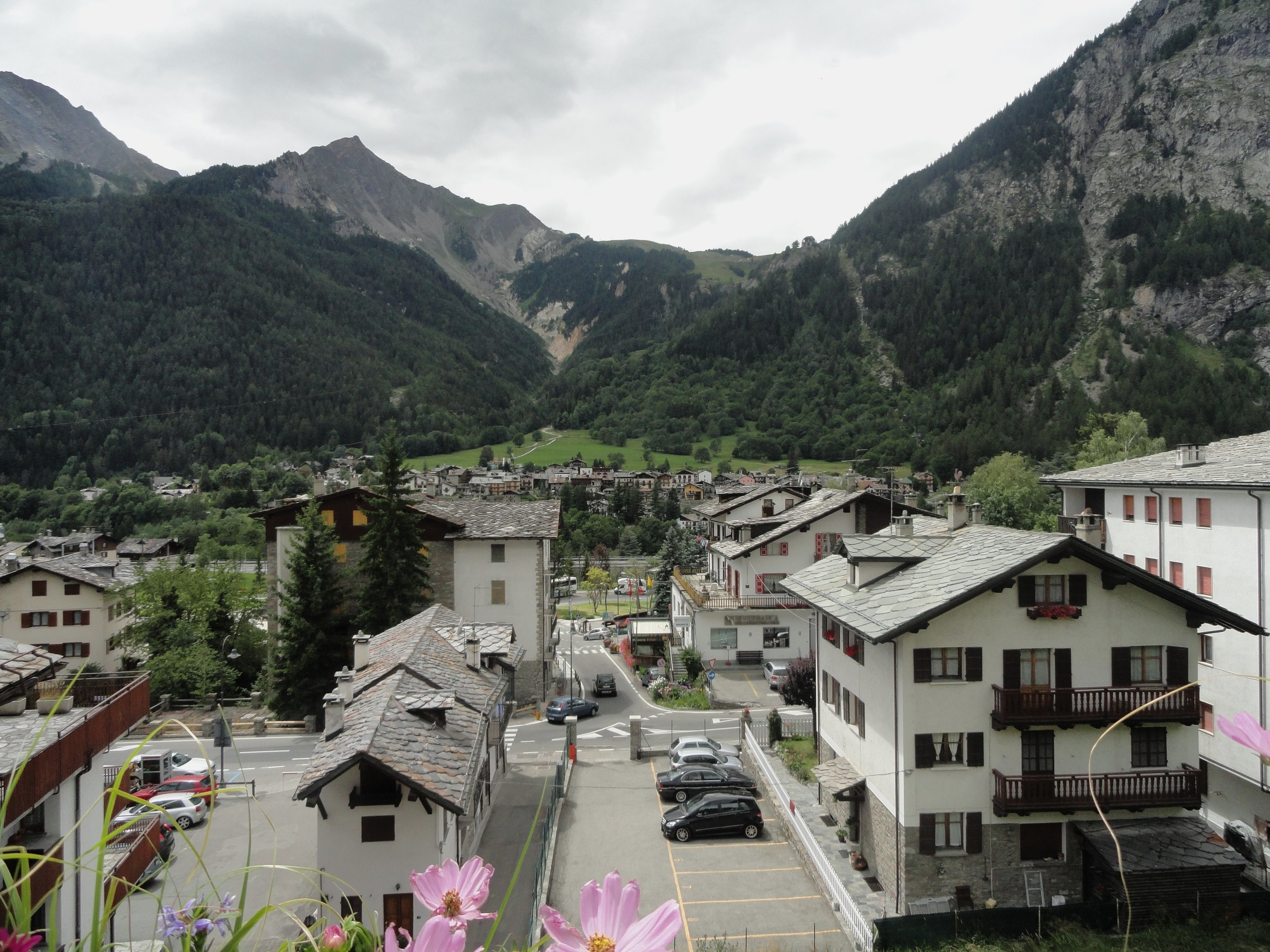
Dolonne hamlet, seen from Joseph-Marie Henry Square

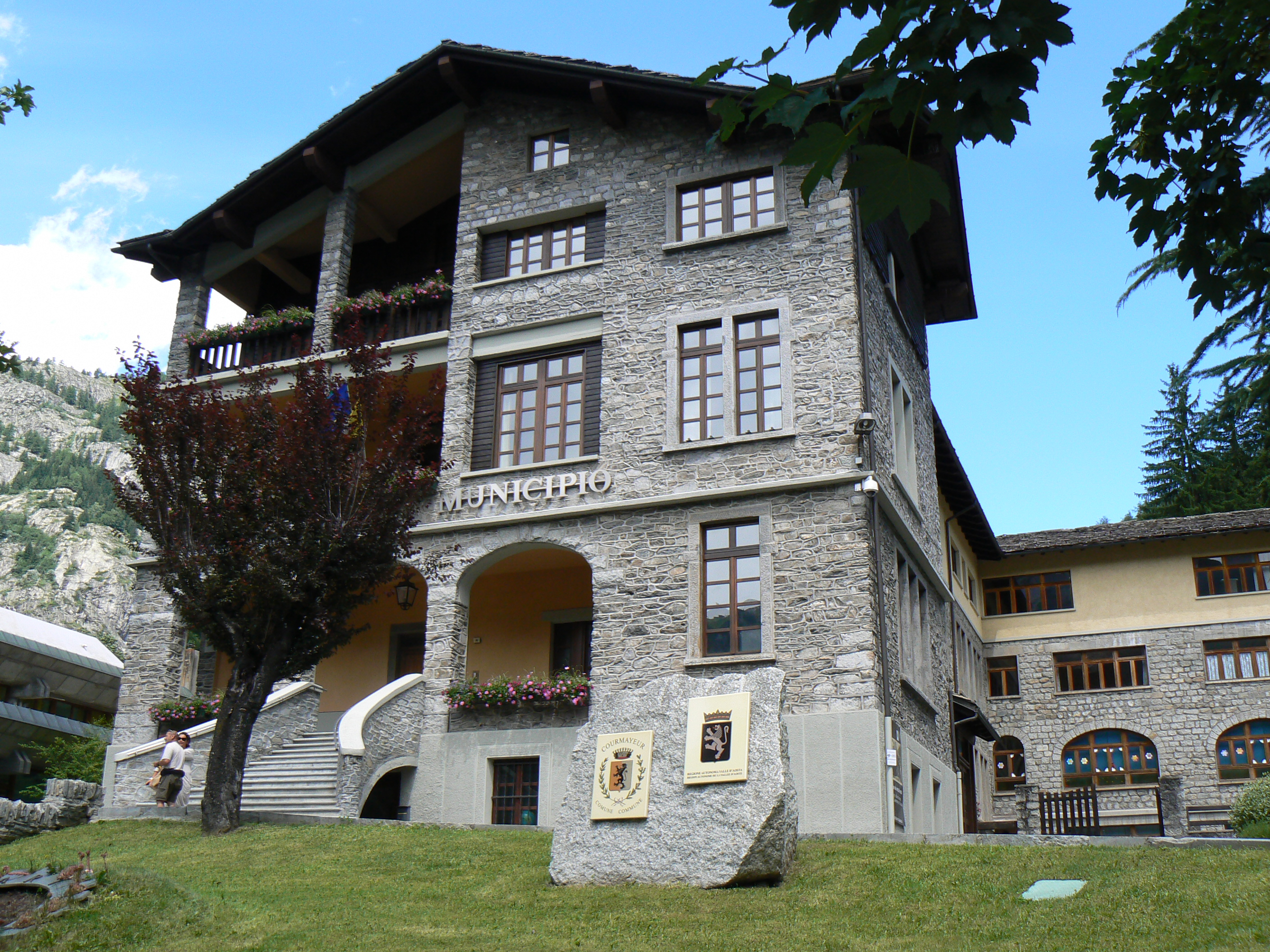
The Town Hall

Courmayeur is cited as "Italy's best all-round ski resort", and contains the Alpine Botanical Garden Saussurea, which describes itself as Europe's highest botanical garden. The Church of Saint-Pantaléon dates to the 18th century.

One of the major sights in Courmayeur is a panoramic, 360 degree rotating cablecar, connecting the village to two separate mountain bases. The system was inaugurated in 2015 and including the base station, has a total of 3 stations: Courmayeur (1,300 m), Pavillon (2,173 m) and Pointe Helbronner (3,466 m).

In the summer months Courmayeur is a popular destination for hikers. The nearby village of La Palud is the base station of the Skyway Monte Bianco, the cable car to the Pointe Helbronner. This links to the Vallée Blanche Aerial Tramway going to the Aiguille du Midi, which connects to the Téléphérique de l'Aiguille du Midi, the cable car from Chamonix.

Notre Dame de Guérison sanctuary stands at the foot of Mont Chétif.

== Sports ==
- Biathlon World Championships 1959
- 2011 World Junior Short Track Speed Skating Championships
- 2012 Italian Figure Skating Championships
- Courmayeur Ladies Open
- Mont Blanc Trophy
- Valle d'Aosta Open
- Courmayeur–Champex–Chamonix

== Sister cities ==
- Chamonix, France
