= 1786 =

1786 in various calendars
- Gregorian calendar: 1786; MDCCLXXXVI
- Ab urbe condita: 2539
- Armenian calendar: 1235; ԹՎ ՌՄԼԵ
- Assyrian calendar: 6536
- Balinese saka calendar: 1707–1708
- Bengali calendar: 1192–1193
- Berber calendar: 2736
- British Regnal year: 26 Geo. 3 – 27 Geo. 3
- Buddhist calendar: 2330
- Burmese calendar: 1148
- Byzantine calendar: 7294–7295
- Chinese calendar: 乙巳年 (Wood Snake); 4483 or 4276 — to — 丙午年 (Fire Horse); 4484 or 4277
- Coptic calendar: 1502–1503
- Discordian calendar: 2952
- Ethiopian calendar: 1778–1779
- Hebrew calendar: 5546–5547
- Hindu calendars
- Vikram Samvat: 1842–1843
- Shaka Samvat: 1707–1708
- Kali Yuga: 4886–4887
- Holocene calendar: 11786
- Igbo calendar: 786–787
- Iranian calendar: 1164–1165
- Islamic calendar: 1200–1201
- Japanese calendar: Tenmei 6 (天明６年)
- Javanese calendar: 1712–1713
- Julian calendar: Gregorian minus 11 days
- Korean calendar: 4119
- Minguo calendar: 126 before ROC 民前126年
- Nanakshahi calendar: 318
- Thai solar calendar: 2328–2329
- Tibetan calendar: ཤིང་མོ་སྦྲུལ་ལོ་ (female Wood-Snake); 1912 or 1531 or 759 — to — མེ་ཕོ་རྟ་ལོ་ (male Fire-Horse); 1913 or 1532 or 760

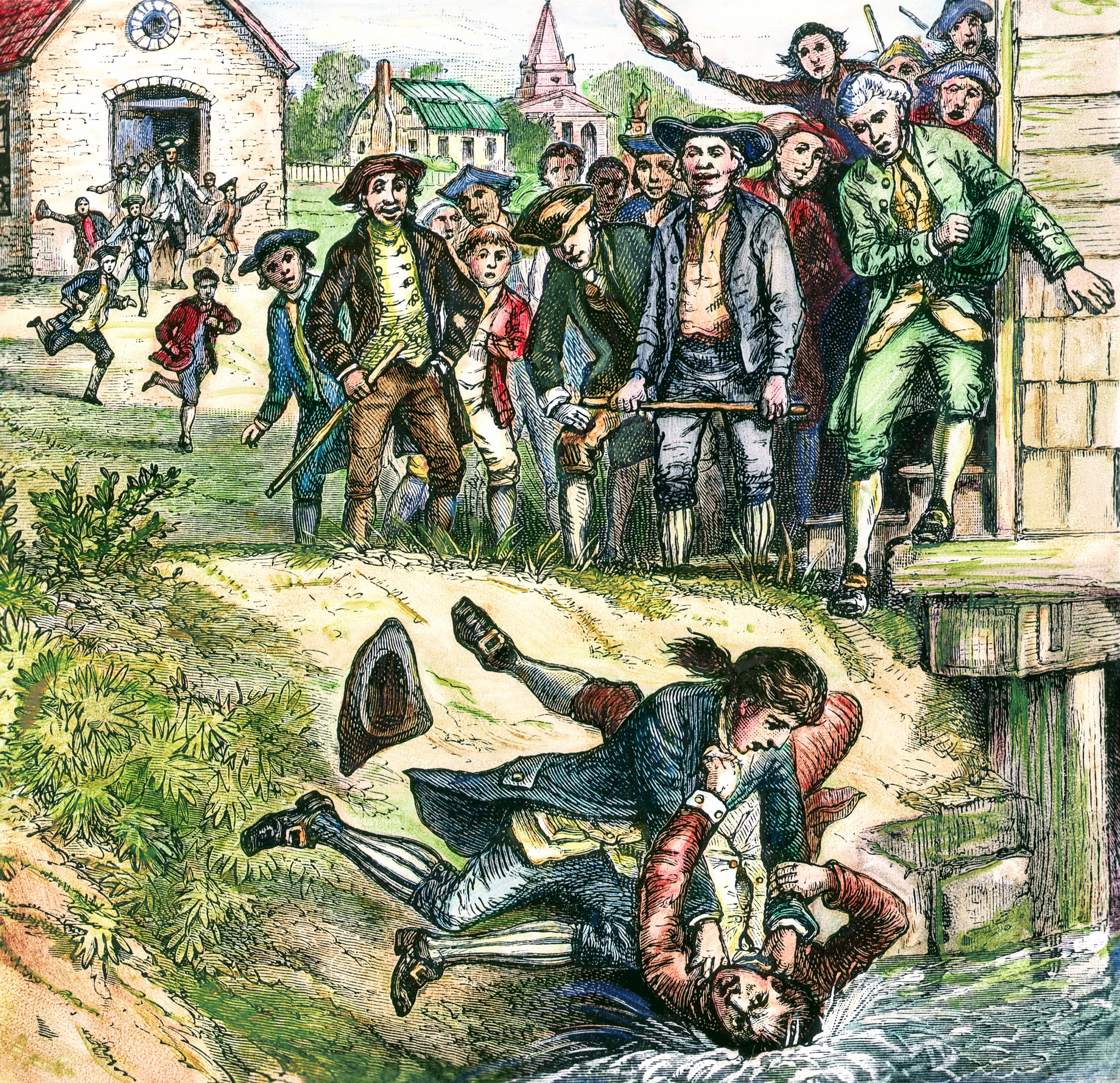
August 29: Shays' Rebellion of taxpayers begins in U.S. Commonwealth of Massachusetts

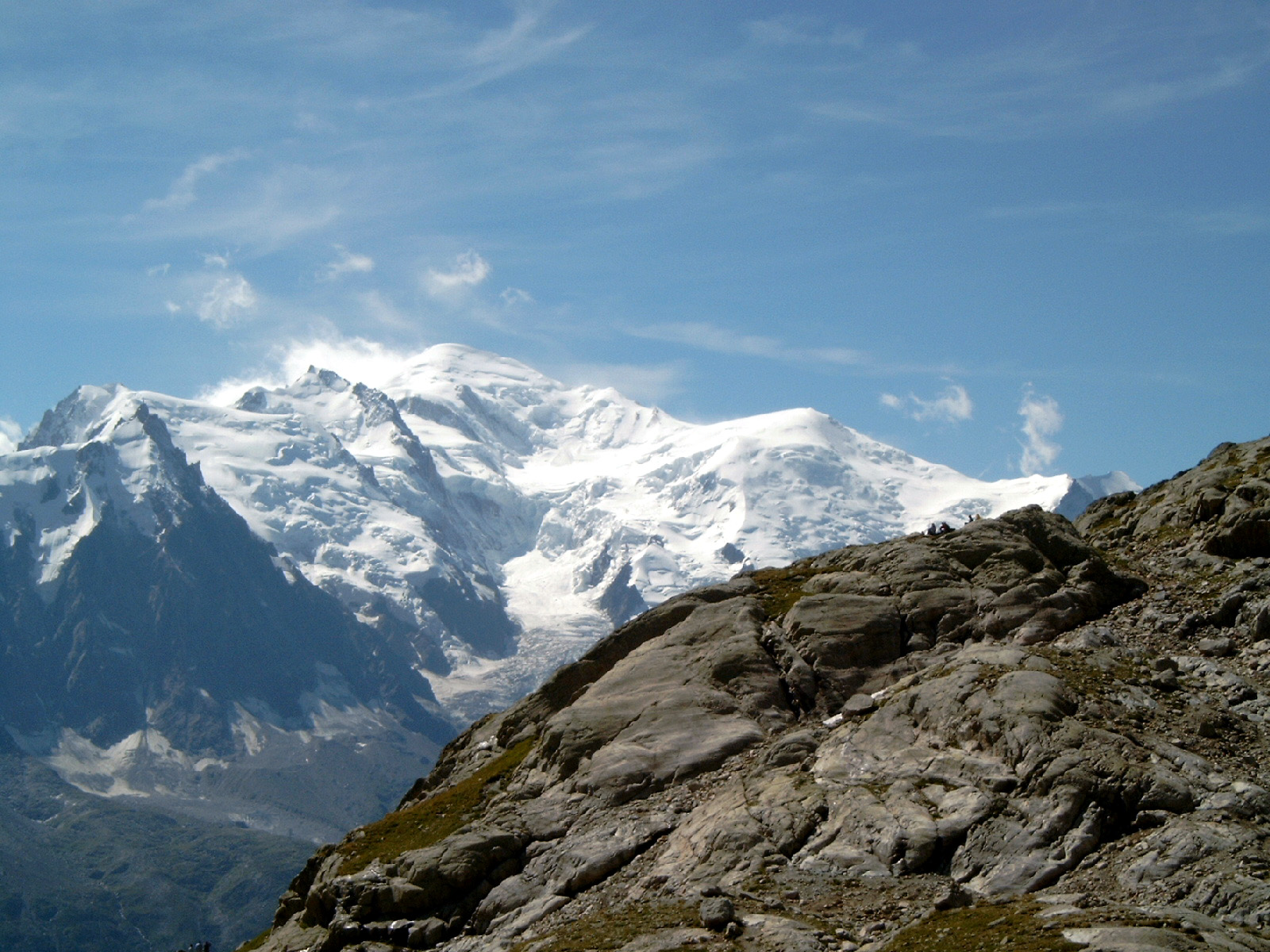
August 8: Mont Blanc climbed for the first time.

1786 (MDCCLXXXVI) was a common year starting on Sunday of the Gregorian calendar and a common year starting on Thursday of the Julian calendar, the 1786th year of the Common Era (CE) and Anno Domini (AD) designations, the 786th year of the 2nd millennium, the 86th year of the 18th century, and the 7th year of the 1780s decade. As of the start of 1786, the Gregorian calendar was 11 days ahead of the Julian calendar, which remained in localized use until 1923.

== Events ==
=== January–March ===
- January 3 – The third Treaty of Hopewell is signed between the United States and the Choctaw.
- January 6 – The outward bound East Indiaman Halsewell is wrecked on the south coast of England in a storm, with only 74 of more than 240 on board surviving.
- February 2 – In a speech before The Asiatic Society in Calcutta, Sir William Jones notes the formal resemblances between Latin, Greek, and Sanskrit, laying the foundation for comparative linguistics and Indo-European studies.
- March 1 – The Ohio Company of Associates is organized by five businessmen at a meeting at the Bunch-of-Grapes Tavern in Boston to purchase land from the United States government to form settlements in the modern-day U.S. state of Ohio.
- March 13 – Construction begins in Dublin on the Four Courts Building, with the first stone laid down by the United Kingdom's Viceroy for Ireland, the Duke of Rutland.

=== April–June ===
- April 2 – The Creek Nation declares war on the U.S. State of Georgia over the matter of white settlers on land not ceded by the Nation. A truce is negotiated on April 17 between Creek Chief Alexander McGillivray (Hoboi-Hili-Miko) and U.S. Army General Lachlan McIntosh but is soon repudiated.
- April 11 – Columbia College (modern-day Columbia University) holds its first graduation, with eight students, including DeWitt Clinton.
- April 25 – The United States and the Kingdom of Portugal sign their first commercial treaty, but it is never ratified.
- April 27 – British astronomer William Herschel publishes his first list of his discoveries, Catalogue of One Thousand New Nebulae and Clusters of Stars; two additional books are published in 1789 and 1802.
- May 1 – Wolfgang Amadeus Mozart's opera The Marriage of Figaro premieres in Vienna.
- May 21 – The trial in the Affair of the Diamond Necklace ends in Paris.
- June 2 – The Tignon law is enacted by Spanish Governor of Louisiana Esteban Rodríguez Miró, to force black women to wear a tignon headscarf.
- June 6 – Nathaniel Gorham is chosen as the new President of the U.S. Confederation Congress to substitute for John Hancock, who cannot take office because of illness.
- June 10 – An earthquake-caused landslide dam on the Dadu River gives way, killing 100,000 in the Sichuan province of China.
- June 25 – Gavriil Pribylov discovers St. George Island of the Pribilof Islands in the Bering Sea.

=== July–September ===
- July 14 – Convention of London between the Kingdom of Great Britain and the Kingdom of Spain: British settlements on the Mosquito Coast of Central America are to be evacuated; Spain expands the territory available to the British in Belize on the Yucatán Peninsula, for cutting mahogany.
- July 31 – The 'Kilmarnock volume' of Robert Burns' Poems, Chiefly in the Scottish Dialect is published in Scotland.
- August
  - James Rumsey tests his first steamboat on the Potomac River, at Shepherdstown, Virginia.
  - The Cabinet of Great Britain approves the establishment of a penal colony, at Botany Bay in Australia.
- August 1 – Caroline Herschel discovers a comet (the first discovered by a woman) from England.
- August 8 – Mont Blanc is climbed for the first time, by Michel-Gabriel Paccard and Jacques Balmat.
- August 11 – Captain Francis Light acquires the island of Penang from the Sultan of Kedah on behalf of the British East India Company, renaming it Prince of Wales Island in honour of the heir to the British throne, and establishing the settlement of George Town. This is the first colony of the British Empire in Southeast Asia.
- August 17 – Frederick William II, the paternal nephew of Frederick the Great, becomes King of Prussia.
- August 18 – The Kingdom of Denmark-Norway charters six settlements in Iceland to trade with it, thus ending the Danish–Icelandic Trade Monopoly, and founding Reykjavík.
- August 29 – Shays' Rebellion begins in Massachusetts.
- September–December – Goethe undertakes his Italian Journey (published in 1817).
- September 2 – A hurricane strikes Barbados.
- September 11–14 - The Annapolis Convention is held by delegates from six of the 13 states (Maryland, Virginia, Pennsylvania, Delaware, New Jersey and New York) resulting in the scheduling of the Philadelphia Convention to draft a national constitution.
- September 14 – Connecticut cedes to the United States all of its claims to lands between the 41st and 42nd parallels north and west of the Connecticut Western Reserve.
- September 25 – The mine of Huancavelica in the Peruvian Andes collapses killing more than a hundred people. The event is a major setback for quicksilver production in the Spanish Empire.
- September 26 – Eden Agreement: A commercial treaty is signed between the Kingdoms of Great Britain and France.

=== October–December ===
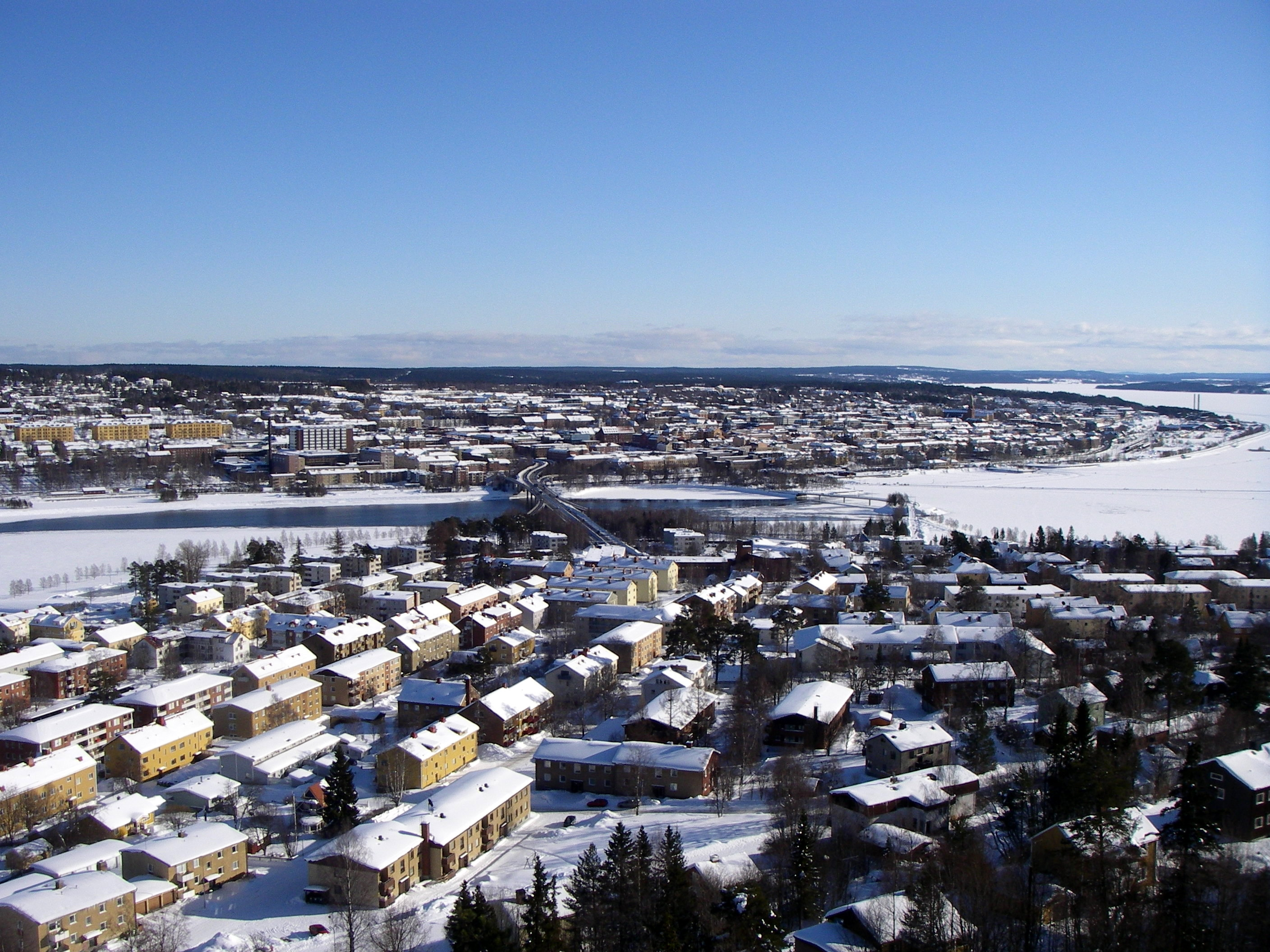
Östersund

- October 6 – HMS Bellerophon begins service with the Royal Navy.
- October 10 – The Confederation Congress of the United States directs backpay for seven months for Virginia officers who have been waiting since 1782.
- October 12 – King George III of the United Kingdom appoints Captain Arthur Phillip as the first Governor of New Holland, which comprises the area of modern Australia from the 135th meridian east to the east coast and all adjacent islands in the Pacific Ocean.
- October 16 – The Confederation Congress establishes the United States Mint to make common coinage and currency for the U.S., to replace individual state coins.
- October 23
  - The 13th century AH begins on the Islamic calendar on the 1st of Muharram 1201 AH
  - The settlement of Östersund is established in Sweden.
- October 24 – General David Cobb of the Massachusetts militia defeats a body of rebel insurgents at Taunton, Massachusetts in one of the battles of Shays' Rebellion.
- November 7 – The oldest musical organization in the United States, the Stoughton Musical Society, is founded.
- November 30 – Peter Leopold Joseph of Habsburg-Lorraine, Grand Duke of Tuscany, promulgates a penal reform, making his country the first state to abolish the death penalty. This day is therefore commemorated by 300 cities around the world as Cities for Life Day.
- December 4 – Mission Santa Barbara is founded by Padre Fermín Lasuén as the tenth of the Spanish missions in California.
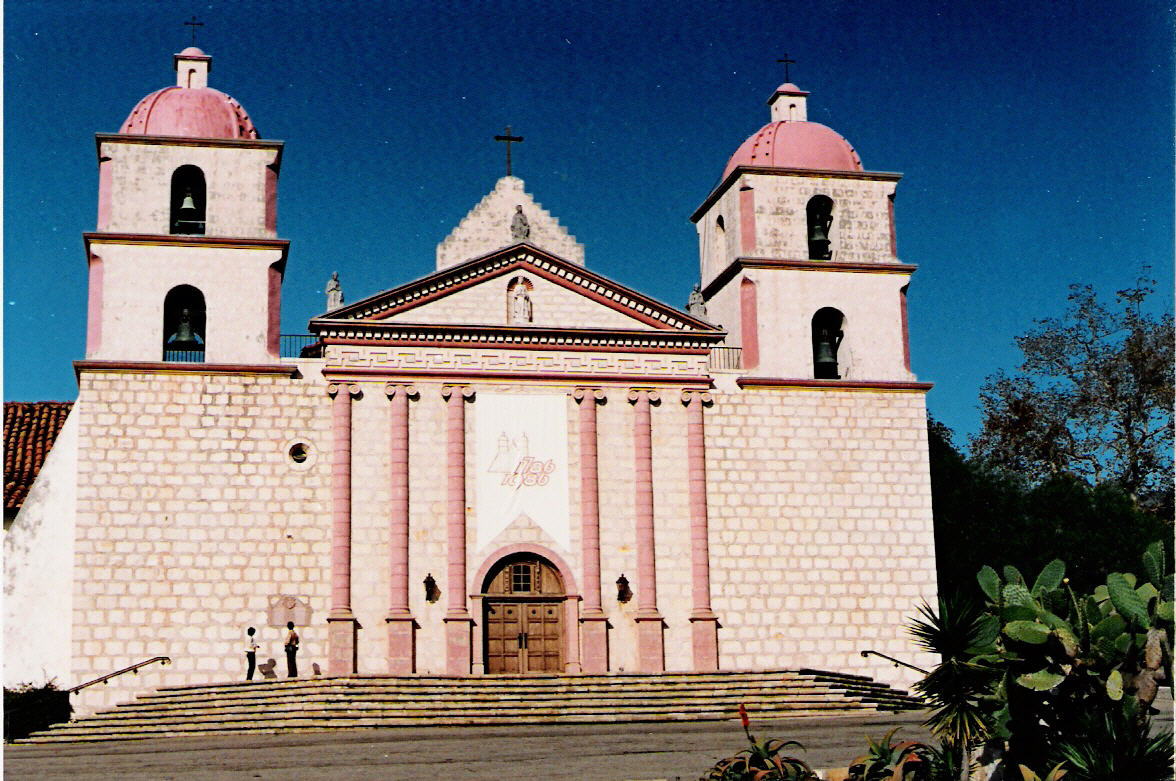
  December 4: Mission Santa Barbara is founded.
- December 20 – Robert Burns's Address to a Haggis is first published, in Edinburgh.

=== Date unknown ===
- Winter 1786/87 – English captain George Dixon becomes the first European to visit the Hawaiian island of Molokaʻi.
- The town of Martinsborough, North Carolina, named for Royal Governor Josiah Martin in 1771, is renamed "Greenesville" in honor of United States General Nathanael Greene by the North Carolina General Assembly (the name "Greenesville" is later shortened, to become Greenville).
- The last reliably recorded wolf in Ireland is hunted down and killed near Mount Leinster, County Carlow, for killing sheep.

== Births ==
- January 7 – John Catron, Associate Justice of the Supreme Court of the United States (d. 1865)
- January 8 – Nicholas Biddle, President of the Second Bank of the United States (d. 1844)
- January 11 – Joseph Jackson Lister, English opticist, physician (d. 1869)
- January 12 – Sir Robert Inglis, Bt, English politician (d. 1855)
- January 23 – Auguste de Montferrand, French architect (d. 1858)

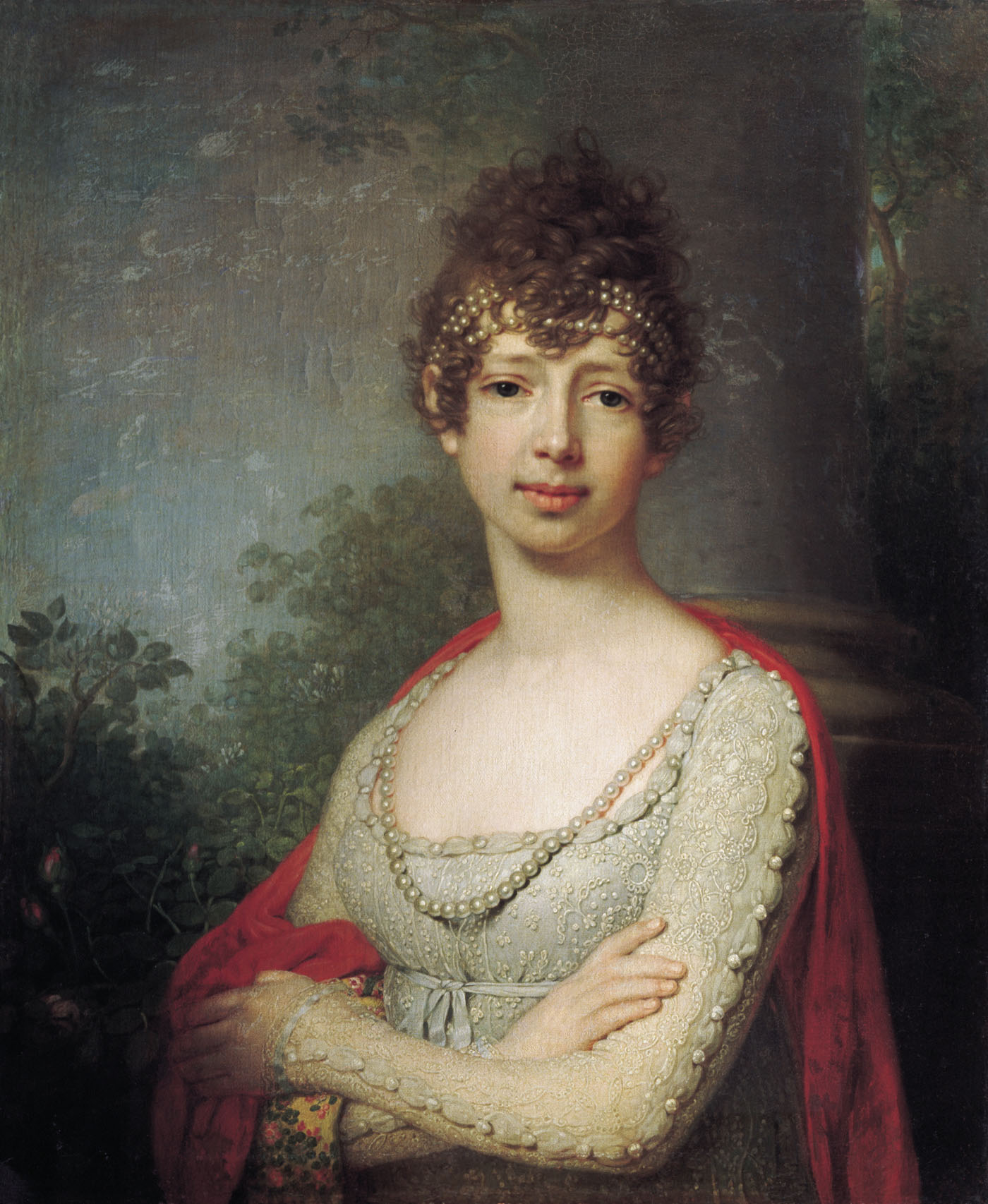
Maria Pavlovna of Russia

- February 16 – Maria Pavlovna of Russia, Grand Duchess of Saxe-Weimar Eisenach (d. 1859)
- February 26 – François Arago, French astronomer, physicist and politician (d. 1853)
- February 24 – Wilhelm Grimm, German philologist and folklorist (d. 1859)
- March 4 – Agustina de Aragón, Spanish heroine (d. 1857)
- March 22 – Joachim Lelewel, Polish historian (d. 1861)
- March 25 – Giovanni Battista Amici, Italian astronomer, microscopist and botanist (d. 1863)
- April 16 – John Franklin, British naval officer and explorer (d. 1847)
- April 28 – Elizabeth Andrew Warren, Cornish botanist, marine algologist (d. 1864)
- May 29 – Alexander Bryan Johnson, American philosopher (d. 1867)
- June 13 – Winfield Scott, American general, presidential candidate (d. 1866)
- June 26 – Sunthorn Phu, Thai poet (d. 1855)

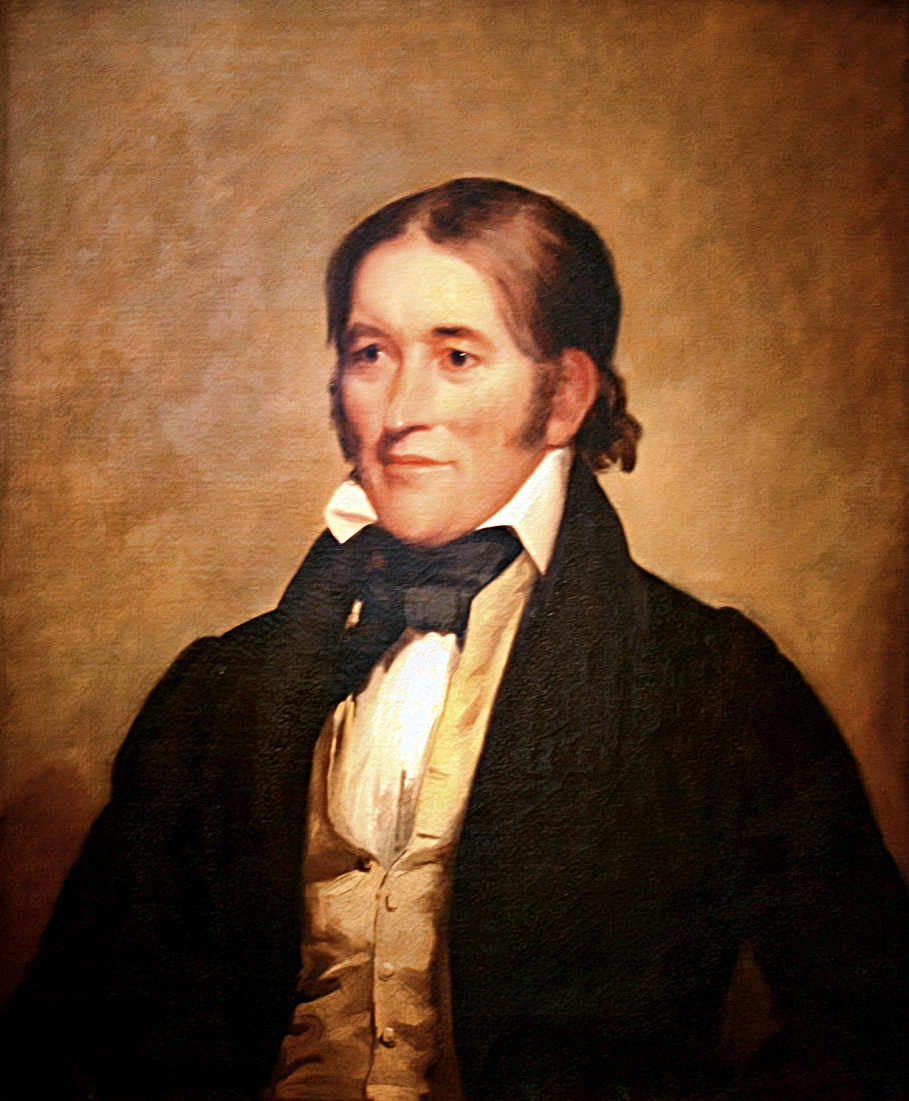
Davy Crockett

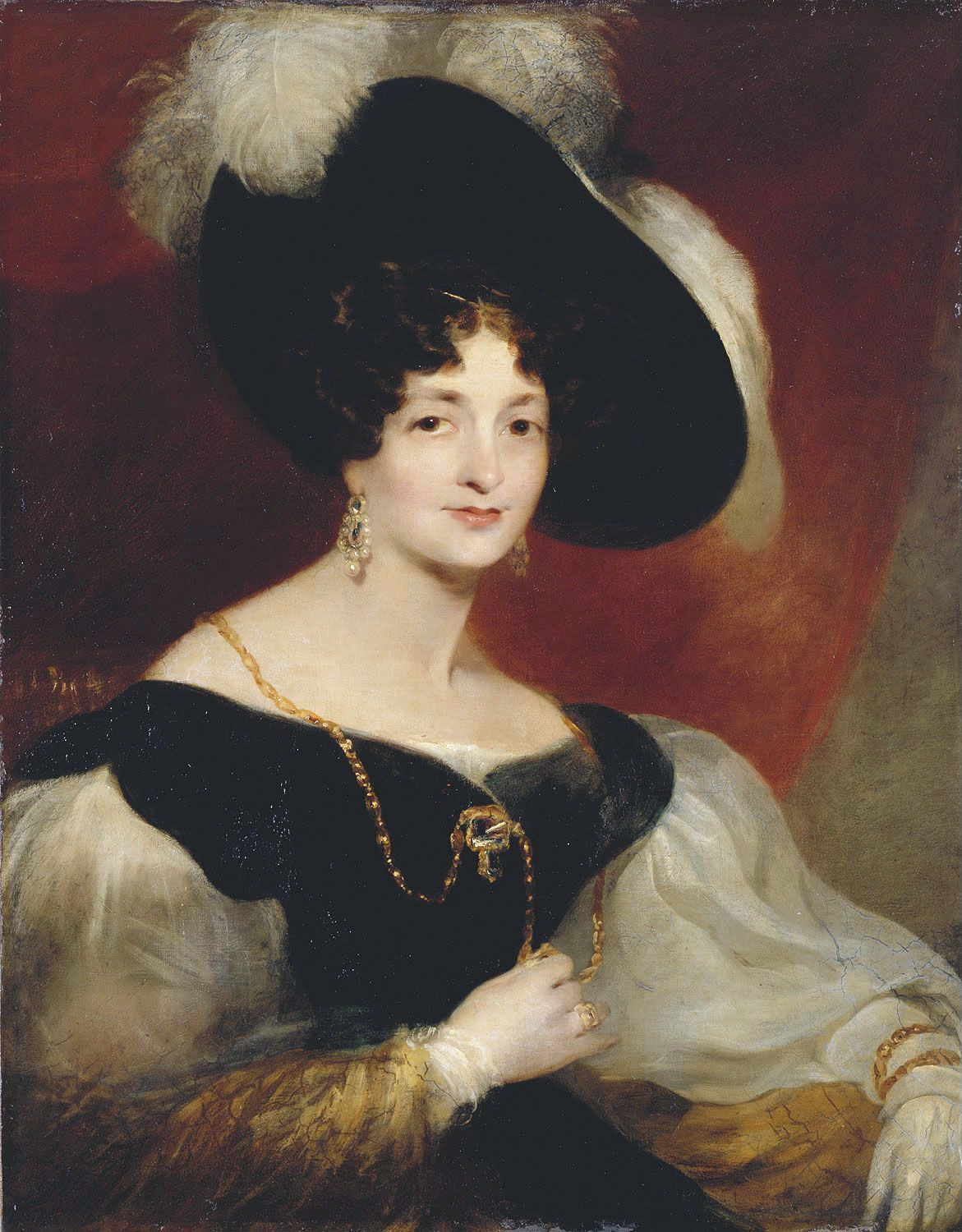
Princess Victoria of Saxe-Coburg-Saalfeld

- August 17
  - Davy Crockett, American frontiersman (d. 1836)
  - Princess Victoria of Saxe-Coburg-Saalfeld, mother of Queen Victoria (d. 1861)
- August 25 – King Ludwig I of Bavaria (d. 1868)
- August 31 – Michel Eugène Chevreul, French chemist (d. 1889)
- September 10 - Nicolás Bravo, 3-time President of Mexico (d. 1854)
- September 11 - Friedrich Kuhlau, German composer (d. 1832)
- September 18
  - King Christian VIII of Denmark (d. 1848)
  - Justinus Kerner, German physician (d. 1862)
- September 24 – Charles Bianconi, Italian-Irish entrepreneur (d. 1875)
- September 29 – Guadalupe Victoria, 1st President of Mexico (d. 1843)
- November 18
  - Henry Bishop, English composer (d. 1855)
  - Carl Maria von Weber, German composer (d. 1826)
- December 12 – William L. Marcy, American statesman (d. 1857)

=== Date unknown ===
- Kim Jeong-hui, Korean epigrapher (d. 1856)
- probable – Moshoeshoe I of Lesotho (d. 1870)

== Deaths ==
- January 4 – Moses Mendelssohn, Jewish philosopher (b. 1729)
- January 7 – Jean-Étienne Guettard, French physician, scientist (b. 1715)
- January 14 – Meshech Weare, Governor of New Hampshire (b. 1713)
- January 26 – Hans Joachim von Zieten, Prussian field marshal (b. 1699)
- February 25 – Thomas Wright, British astronomer (b. 1711)
- February 28 – John Gwynn, English architect and engineer (b. 1713)
- March 11 – Charles Humphreys, American delegate to the Continental Congress (b. 1714)
- April 10 – John Byron, British naval officer (b. 1723)
- April 20 – John Goodricke, English astronomer (b. 1764)
- May 1 – Benjamin Waller, American politician (b. 1716)
- May 2 – Petronella Johanna de Timmerman, Dutch poet, scientist (b. 1723)
- May 15 – Eva Ekeblad, Swedish scientist and agronomist, first female member of the Royal Swedish Academy of Sciences (b. 1724)
- May 19 – John Stanley, English composer (b. 1712)

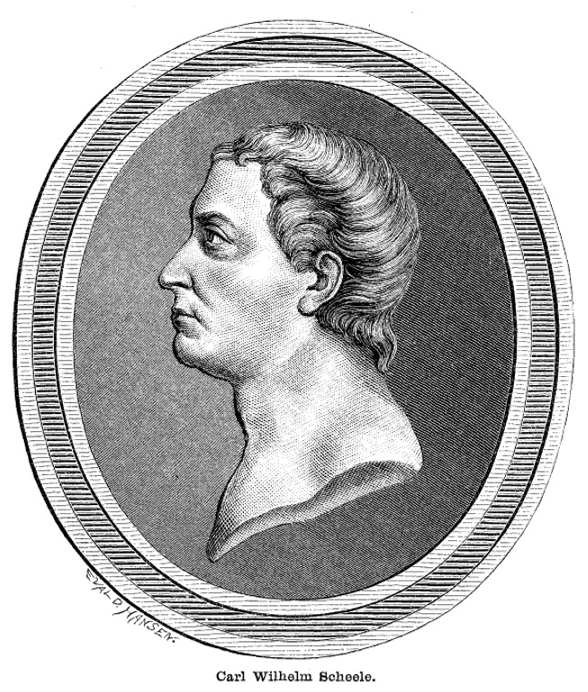
Carl Wilhelm Scheele

- May 21 – Carl Wilhelm Scheele, Swedish chemist (b. 1742)
- May 22 – Carl Fredrik Mennander, Swedish bishop (b. 1712)
- May 25 – Peter III of Portugal, consort of Queen Maria I of Portugal (b. 1717)
- June 17 – Adam Drummond, British politician (b. 1713)
- June 19 – Nathanael Greene, major general in the Continental Army, 3rd Quartermaster General (b. 1742)
- July 28 – Carlo Marchionni, Italian architect (b. 1702)

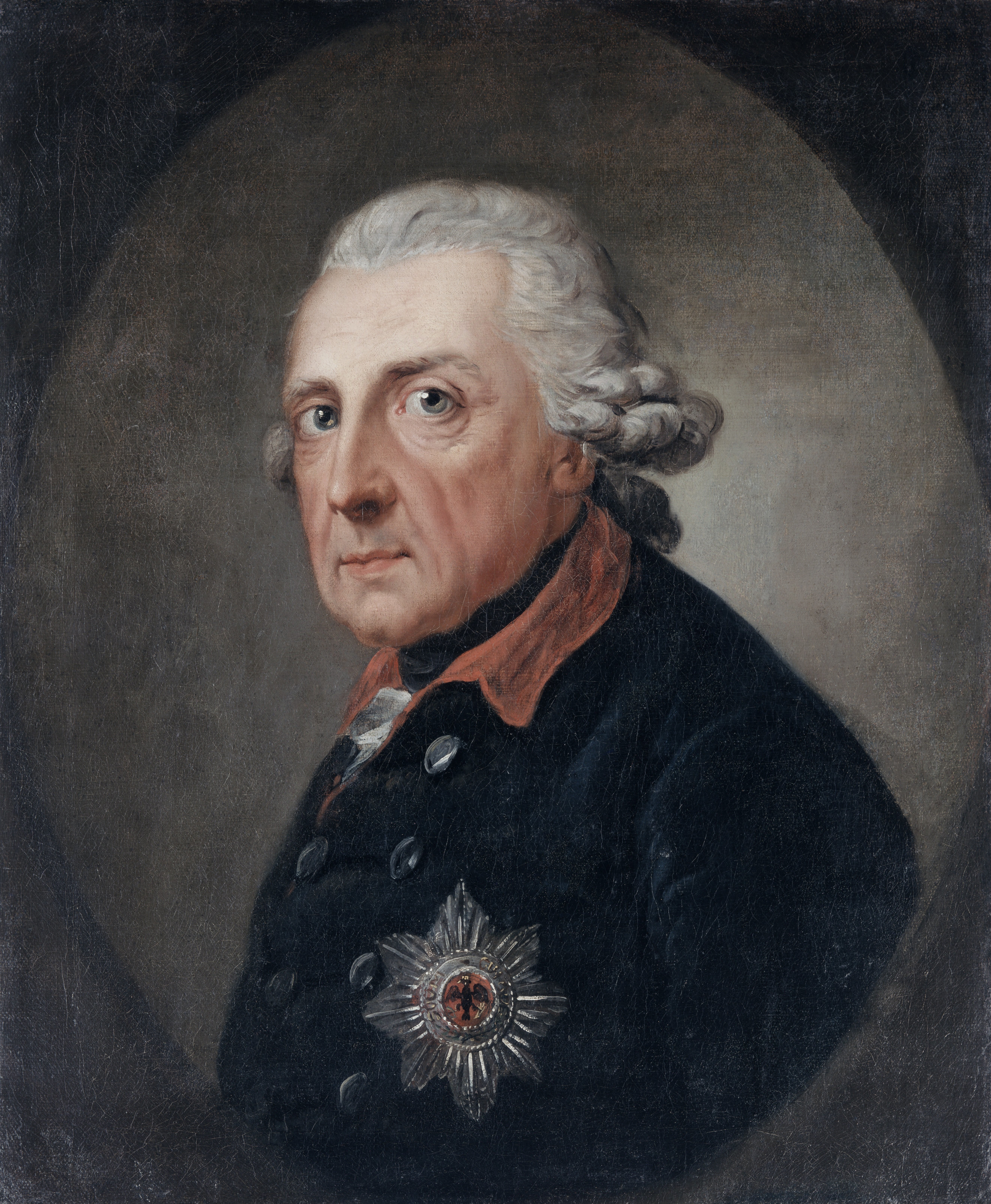
Frederick II of Prussia

- August 17 – King Frederick II of Prussia ("Frederick the Great") (b. 1712)
- August 27 – Carl Fredrik Scheffer, Swedish politician (b. 1715)
- September 5 – Jonas Hanway, English merchant, traveler, and philanthropist (b. 1712)
- September 17 – Tokugawa Ieharu, Japanese shōgun (b. 1737)
- September 18 – Giovanni Battista Guadagnini, Italian luthier (b. 1711)
- October 2 – Augustus Keppel, 1st Viscount Keppel, British admiral (b. 1725)
- October 5 – Johann Gottlieb Gleditsch, German botanist (b. 1714)
- October 17 – Johann Ludwig Aberli, Swiss artist (b. 1723)
- October 20 – Humphrey Sturt, British architect (b. 1725)
- October 31 – Princess Amelia of Great Britain, Second daughter of George II of Great Britain (b. 1711)
- November 30 – Bernardo de Gálvez, Spanish military leader who aided the United States in its quest for independence, in the American Revolutionary War (b. 1746)
- December 26 – Gasparo Gozzi, Italian critic, dramatist (b. 1713)
