= Ice axe =

Winter mountaineering tool

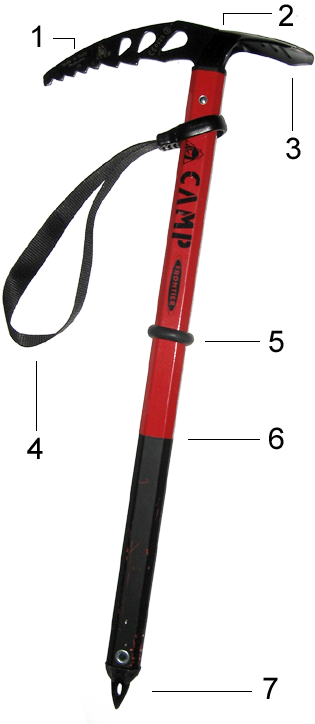
Ice axe 1 – pick 2 – head 3 – adze 4 – leash 5 – leash stop 6 – shaft with rubber grip 7 – spike

An ice axe is a multi-purpose hiking and climbing tool used by mountaineers in both the ascent and descent of routes that involve snow or ice covered (e.g. ice climbing or mixed climbing) conditions. Its use depends on the terrain: in its simplest role it is used like a walking stick, with the mountaineer holding the head in the center of their uphill hand. On steep terrain it is swung by its handle and embedded in snow or ice for security and an aid to traction. It can also be buried pick down, the rope tied around the shaft to form a secure anchor on which to bring up a second climber, or buried vertically to form a stomp belay. The adze is used to cut footholds, as well as scooping out compacted snow to bury the axe as a belay anchor.

== Origin ==
The ice axe of today has its roots in the long-handled alpenstock that came before it. Not only is an ice axe used as a climbing aid, but also as a means of self-arrest in the event of a slip downhill.

Most ice axes meet design and manufacturing standards of organizations such as the Union Internationale des Associations d'Alpinisme (UIAA) or European Committee for Standardization (CEN). There are two classifications of ice axe, Basic (B/Type 1) and Technical (T/Type 2).

- Basic ice axes are designed for use in snow conditions for general mountaineering, and are adequate for basic support and self-arrest. Technical ice axes, which may have curved shafts, are strong enough to be used for steep or vertical ice climbing and belaying on such ground.
- Specialized scaled-down ice axes used for vertical ice climbing are known as ice tools. Ice tools have shorter and more curved shafts; stronger, sharper, and more curved replaceable picks, and often ergonomic grips and finger rests. Used in a pair, one is usually equipped with an adze for chipping and clearing snow whilst the other has a hammer to aid gear placement.

For ski mountaineering and racing, where weight is of paramount concern, manufacturers have produced short (~45 cm or 18 in) and light (200–300 g or 7–11 oz) ice axes. Some of these have aluminum alloy heads/picks which are unlikely to be as effective or robust as steel heads/picks.

== Components ==
An ice axe consists of at least five components:

- Head – usually made of steel and featuring a pick and adze. A hole in the center is provided for attaching a wrist leash or carabiner.
- Pick — the toothed pointed end of the head, typically slightly curved (aiding both in ergonomics and self-arrest).
- Adze — the flat, wide end of the head used for chopping steps in hard snow and ice.
- Hammer — the hammer is an alternative to the adze. May be used for aiding placement of protection.
- Shaft — straight or slightly angled, typically wider front-to-back than side-to-side, flat on the sides and smoothly rounded on the ends. Traditional shafts were made of wood, but are now almost exclusively of lightweight metals (such as aluminum, titanium and steel alloys) or composites (including fiberglass, Kevlar or carbon filament).
- Spike, or ferrule — a point at the base of the shaft used for balance and safety when the axe is held by its head in walking stick fashion. Usually made of steel.

== Accessories ==
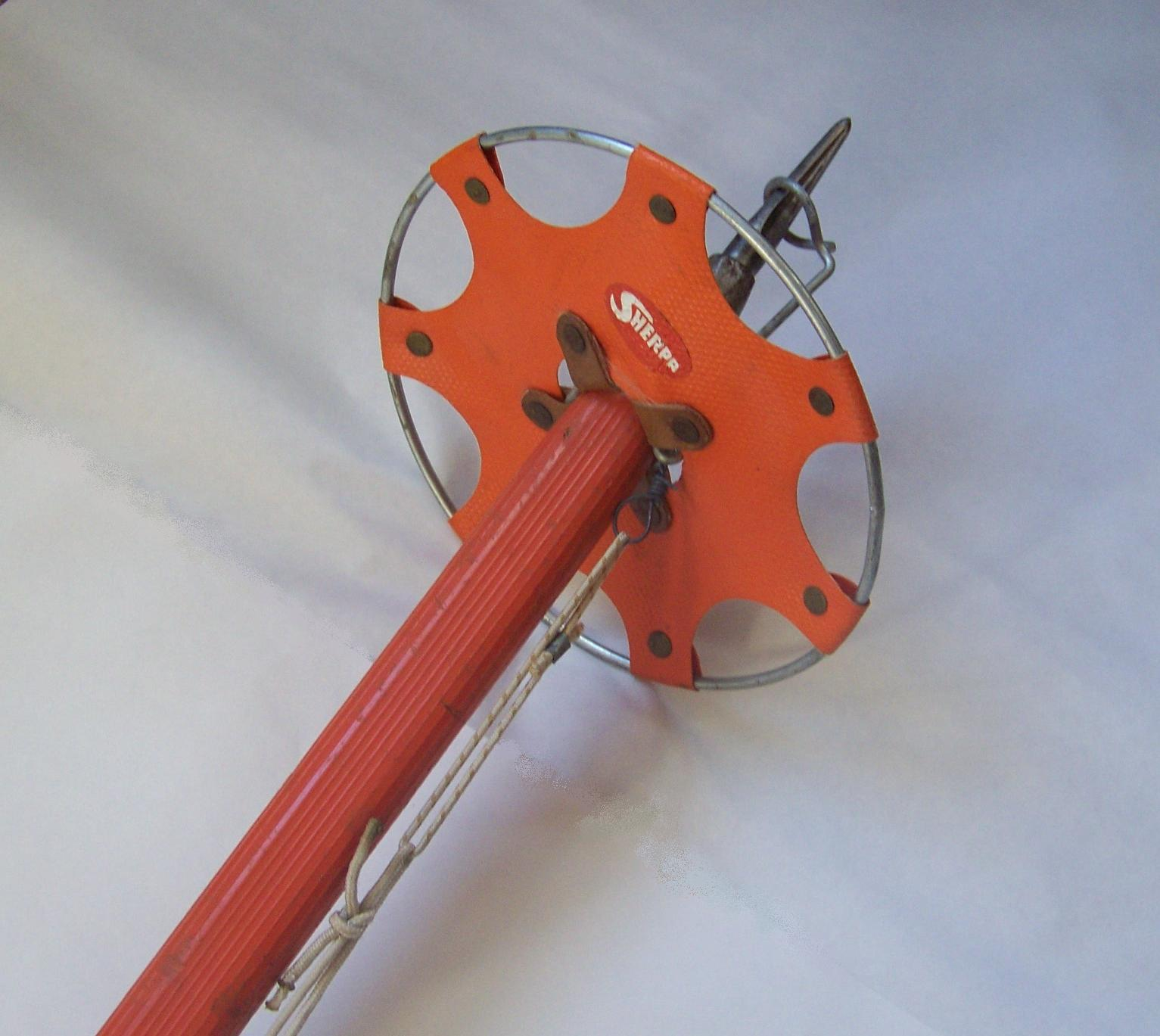
A removable snow basket accessory installed on an ice axe

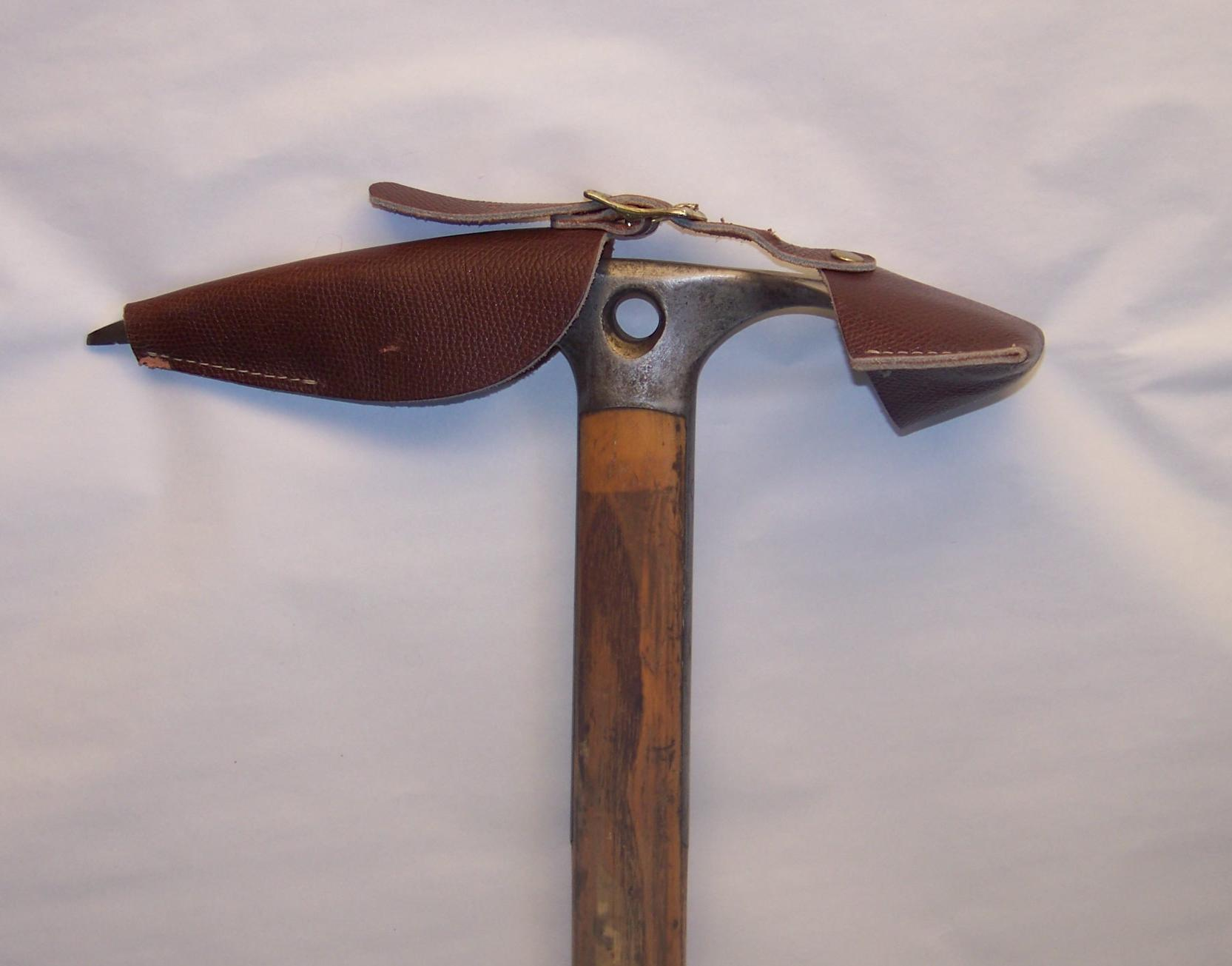
A leather pick & adze guard installed on an ice axe

Ice axe accessories include:

- Leash – nylon webbing with an adjustable loop for securing the axe to hand. Often secured by a ring constrained to slide a limited distance on the shaft.
- Leash stop – a rubber keeper or metal stud preventing the leash from slipping off of the ice axe.
- Snow basket – similar to baskets on ski poles, temporarily mounted on the shaft close to the spike to keep the shaft from sinking into soft snow. Not at all common in Europe.
- Pick and adze guard – a cover to protect from sharp edges and points when the axe is not being used.
- Spike guard – a cover to protect from the sharp spike when the axe is not being used.

== Size ==
Ice-axe spike-to-head lengths used to generally range from 60–90 cm (24–35 in). This is just too short to be used as a walking stick on level ground (the way its forebear, the 150-centimetre-long (5 ft) 19th century alpenstock, was), but is ergonomic when ascending steep slopes. For flatter ground, where consequences of a slip are not large, walking poles are more appropriate.

The old method to approximate the correct length of an ice axe was for the climber to hold the axe (spike facing the ground) at his/her side while standing relaxed. The spike of the ice axe should barely touch the ground when the climber stands fully upright holding the axe in this manner. This may still be appropriate when the ice axe is to be used on relatively flat ground, most likely in glacier travel.

Modern mountaineers often carry shorter ice axes 45–60 cm (18–24 in), for general use, with anything over 60 cm (24 in) typically regarded as too large and unwieldy for chopping steps or climbing steep snow.

== History ==
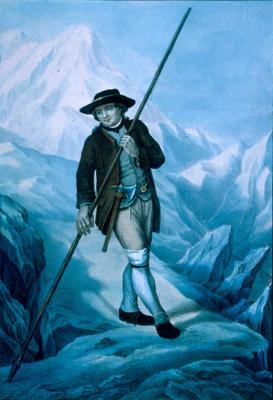
Jacques Balmat carrying an axe and an alpenstock

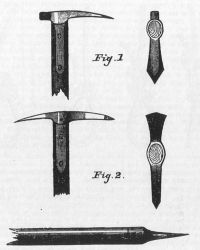
An 1872 diagram of ice axe design

The antecedent of the ice axe was the alpenstock, a long wooden pole with an iron spike tip, used by shepherds for travel on snowfields and glaciers in the Alps since the Middle Ages. On 8 August 1786, Jacques Balmat and Michel-Gabriel Paccard made the first ascent of Mont Blanc. Balmat, a chamois hunter and crystal collector, had experience with high mountain travel, and Paccard had made previous attempts to climb the peak. Illustrations show Balmat carrying two separate tools that would later be merged into the ice axe – an alpenstock (or baton) and a small axe that could be used to chop steps on icy slopes.

According to the earliest manufacturer of ice axes, Grivel, these two tools were merged to create the first true ice axe around 1840. Early ice axes had a vertical adze, with the cutting edge aligned with the direction of the shaft, as in a conventional axe. This design lasted until at least 1860, but eventually the adze was rotated to the current position, perpendicular to the direction of the shaft. The Italian Alpine Club published a book in 1889 entitled Fiorio e Ratti – The dangers of mountaineering and rules to avoid them, which recommended ice axes as among "the inseparable companions of the mountaineer".

In the late 19th century, the typical ice axe shaft measured 120–130 cm (47–51 in) in length. British climber Oscar Eckenstein started the trend toward shorter ice axes with a lighter model measuring 85–86 cm (33–34 in). Initially, this innovation was criticized by well-known climbers of the era, including Martin Conway, a prominent member of the Alpine Club, who was the leader of an early expedition to the Baltoro region near K2 in 1892 of which Eckenstein was a member.

Early ice axes had picks and adzes of about equal lengths. By the beginning of the 20th century, the pick lengthened to about twice the length of the adze. Improvements in crampon design (pioneered by Eckenstein in 1908) and ice climbing technique led to use of shorter, lighter ice axes appropriate to steeper ice climbs in the period between the world wars.

A famous rescue involving an ice axe took place during the Third American Karakoram Expedition to K2 in 1953. One of the climbers, Art Gilkey, was incapacitated by thrombophlebitis. The other climbers attempted to rescue him by lowering him down the mountain by rope, wrapped in a sleeping bag. While crossing a steep ice sheet, a slip caused Gilkey and five other climbers to begin falling down a steep slope. Climber Pete Schoening wedged his ice axe alongside a boulder, and managed to belay the roped climbers, saving their lives. (Gilkey, however, later in the same descent was swept away by an avalanche. Remains of his lost corpse were discovered in 1993.) Schoening's ice axe is now on display at the Bradford Washburn American Mountaineering Museum in Golden, Colorado.

In 1966, Yvon Chouinard led a significant redesign of ice axes, working with initially reluctant manufacturer Charlet to develop a 55-centimetre-long (22 in) ice axe with a dramatically curved pick. Chouinard believed that "a curve compatible with the arc of the axe's swing would allow the pick to stay put better in the ice. I had noticed that a standard pick would often pop out when I placed my weight on it." Chouinard's idea worked and began a period of innovation in ice axe design.

In 1978, the Safety Commission of the Union Internationale des Associations d'Alpinisme (UIAA) established formal standards for ice axe safety and performance. This led to the replacement of the traditional wooden shaft by metal alloy shafts. Ergonomically curved handles became widespread in 1986. Use of modern aluminum alloys have led to a dramatic reduction in the weight of some ice axes. One model now on the market, the C.A.M.P. Corsa, weighs only 205 g (7.2 oz) with a 50-centimetre-long (20 in) shaft. One expert rated this lightweight ice axe as "ideal for low angle glacier travel" but said he "craved the solid and secure heft of a true steel mountain ax" in more demanding steep alpine conditions.

=== Gallery of ice axes 1970s–2010s ===
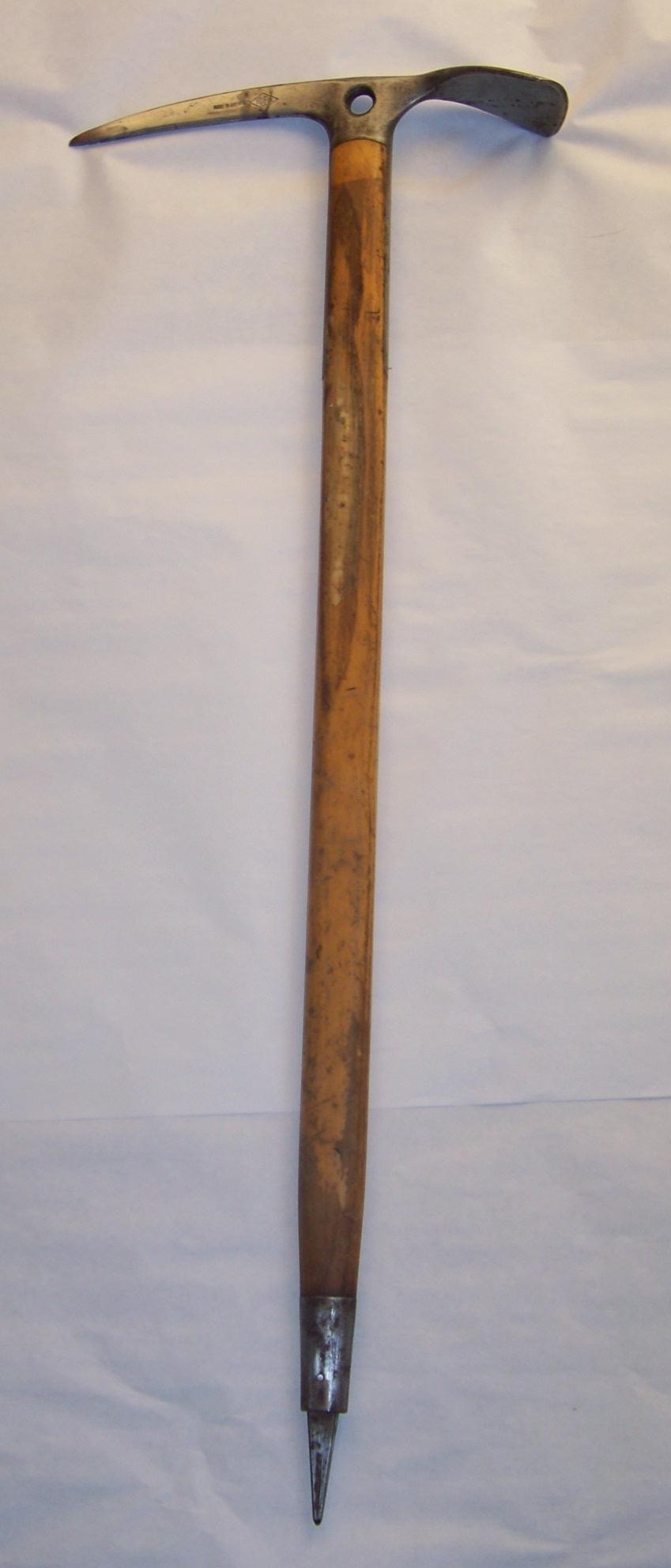
A wooden handled ice axe from the mid-1970s
Length: 75 cm (29 1/2 in)
Weight: 840 g (29 1/2 oz)

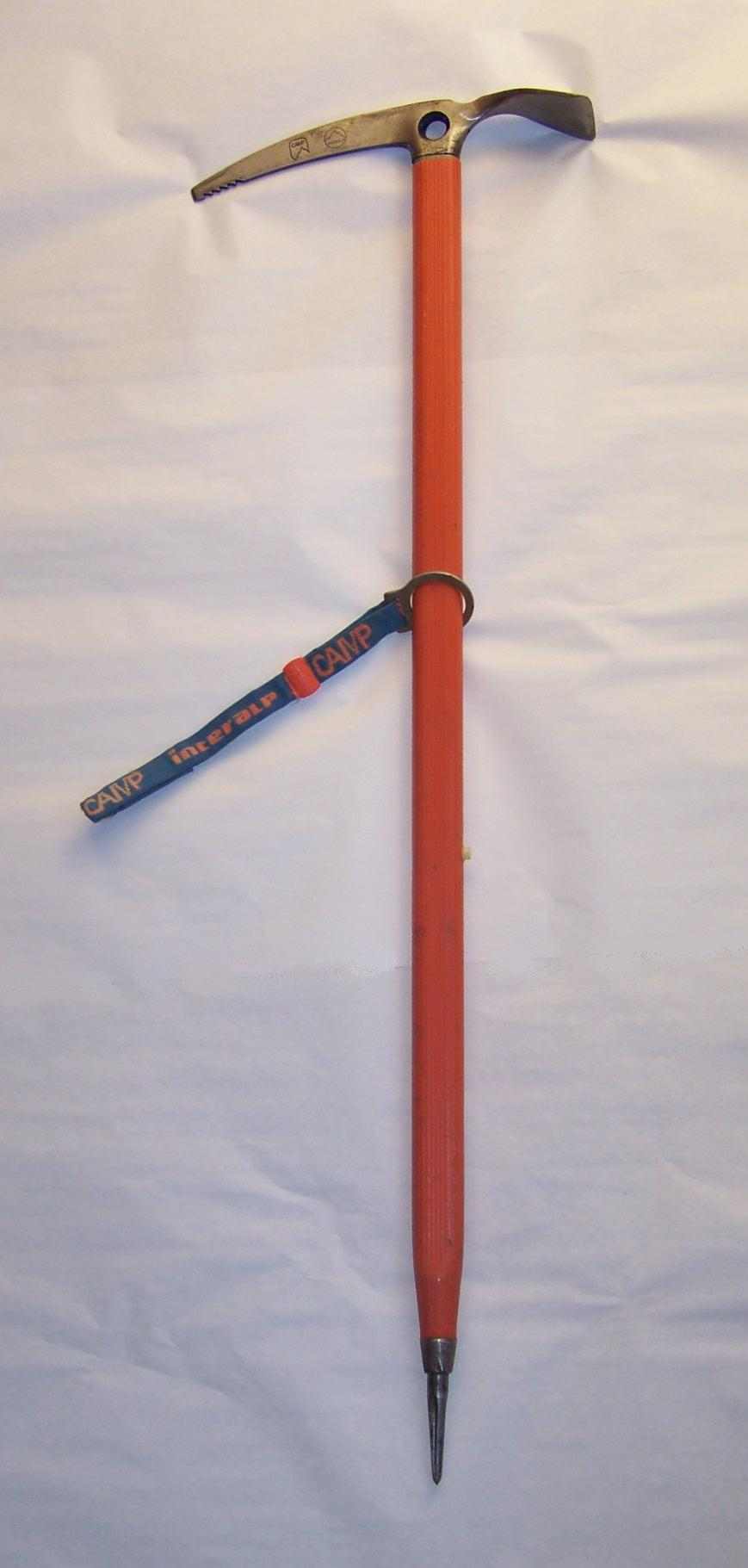
A metal handled ice axe from the late 1970s
Length: 91 cm (35 3/4 in)
Weight: 960 g (33 3/4 oz)

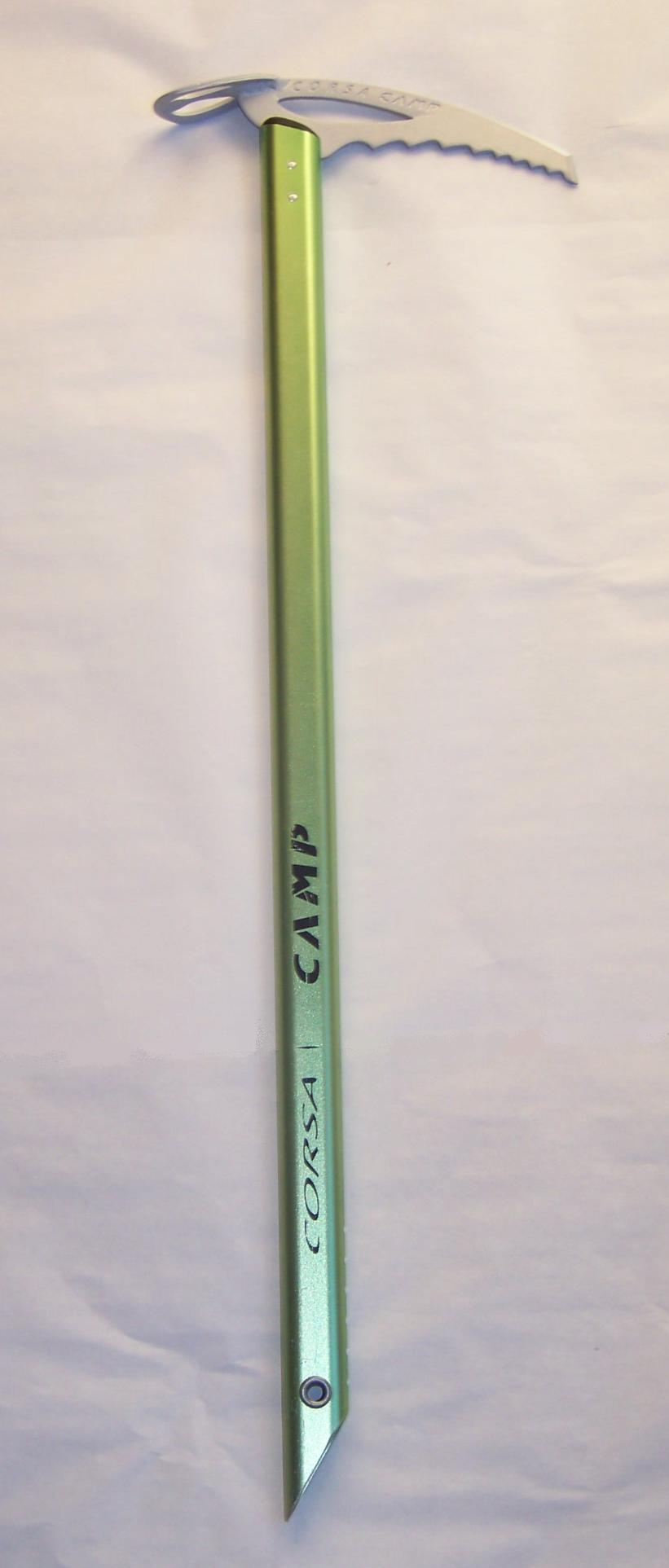
A lightweight CAMP Corsa ice axe purchased in 2007
Length: 70 cm (27 1/2 in)
Weight: 280 g (9 3/4 oz)

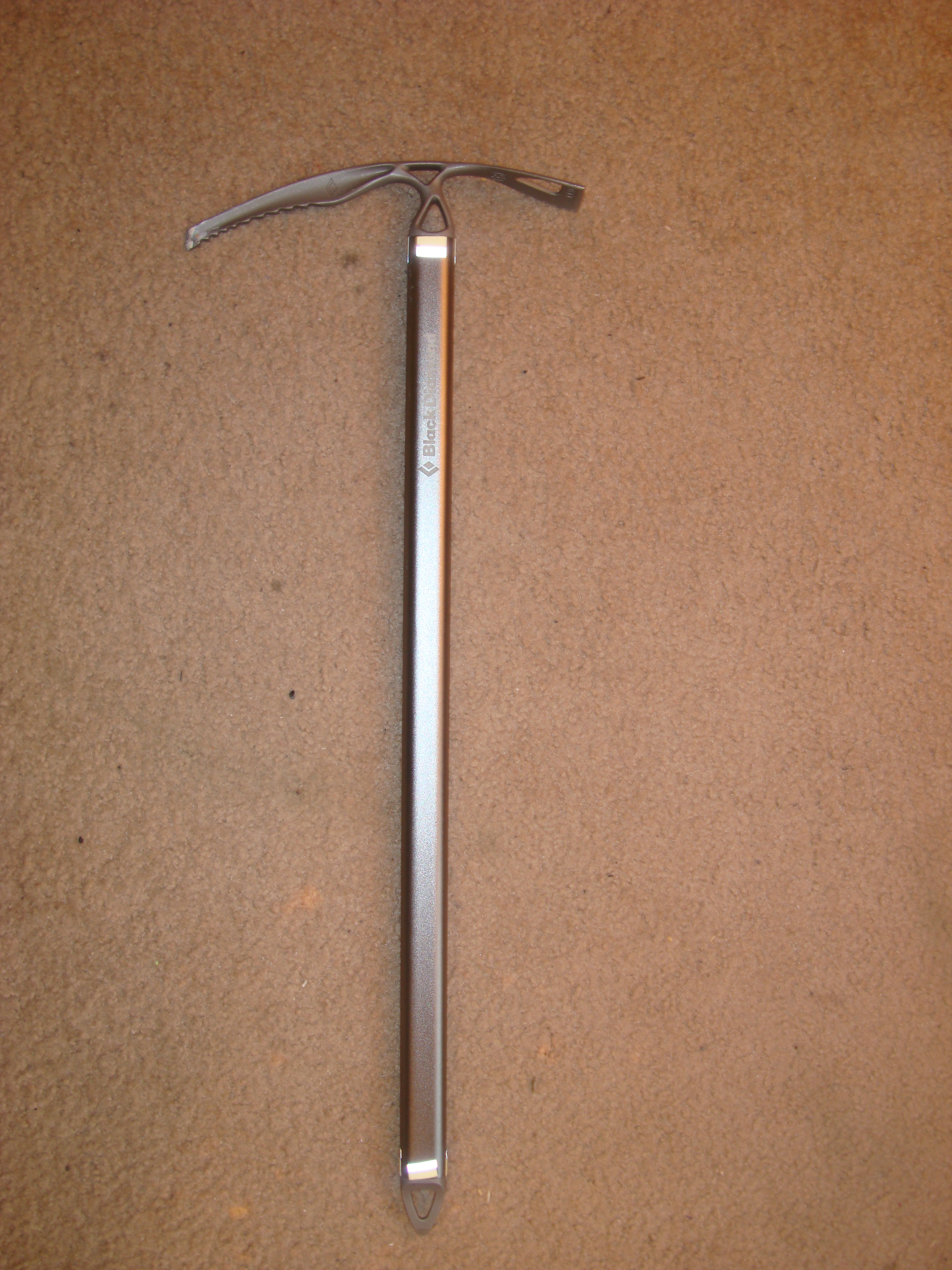
A 2011 Black Diamond ice axe. 71 cm (28 in) long with a weight of 430 g (15 oz)

== Attachment to a pack ==
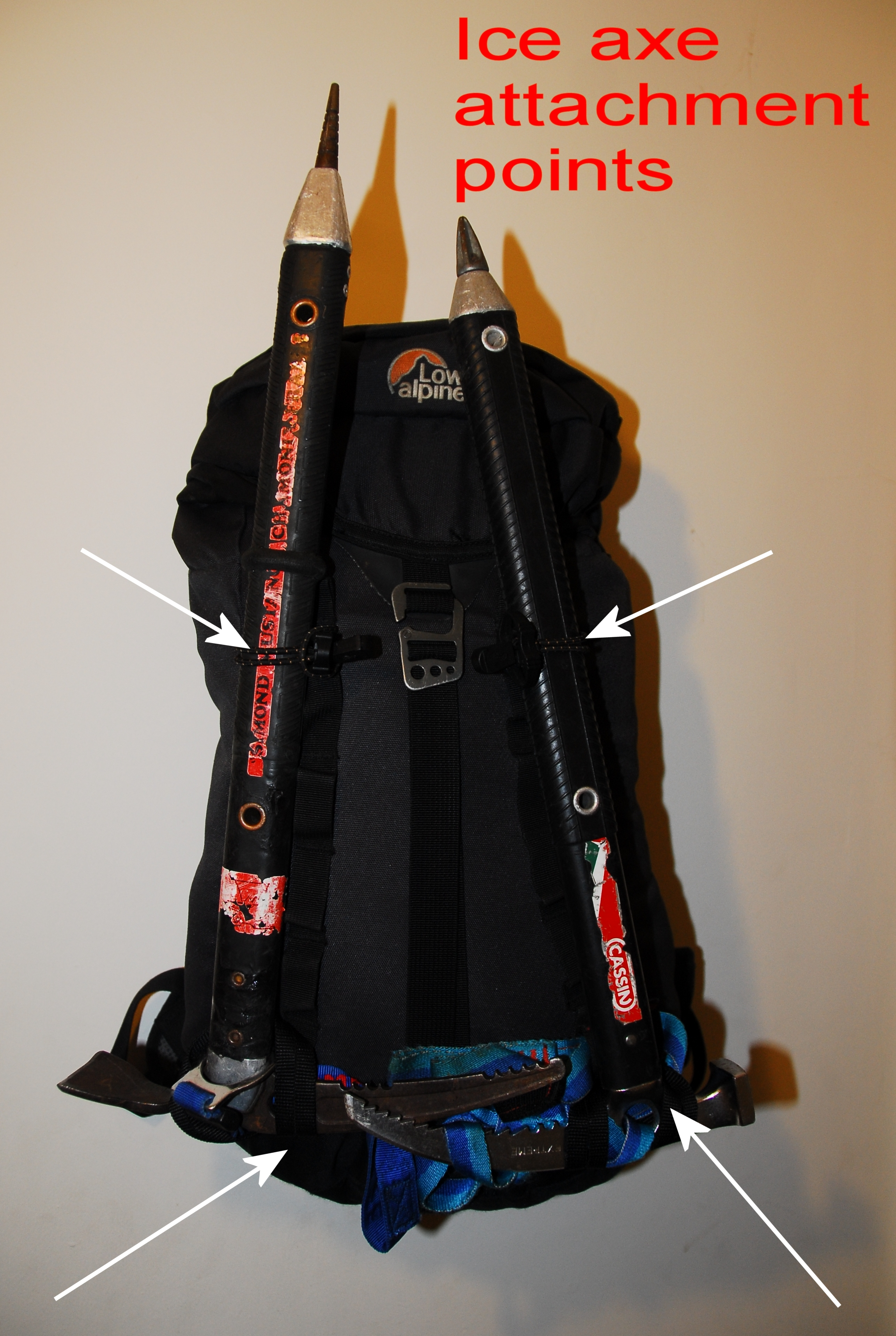
Arrows showing upper and lower attachment loops on a 25 L (1,500 cu in) rucksack. A pair is provided on each side, here with a 55 cm (22 in) ice axe on the left and a 50 cm (20 in) ice hammer on the right.

When not in use an ice axe is stored on the outside of a pack (rucksack). Many models come with a nylon webbing loop sewn on its rear base (off to one side to allow the pick to stay behind the hiker), together with a means to restrain its shaft. Rucksacks with attachment points for two ice axes are also available, popular in ice climbing where two tools are used.
