= Piste de Bobsleigh des Pellerins =

Bobsleigh track in Chamonix, France

Coordinates: 45°54′55″N 6°52′19″E

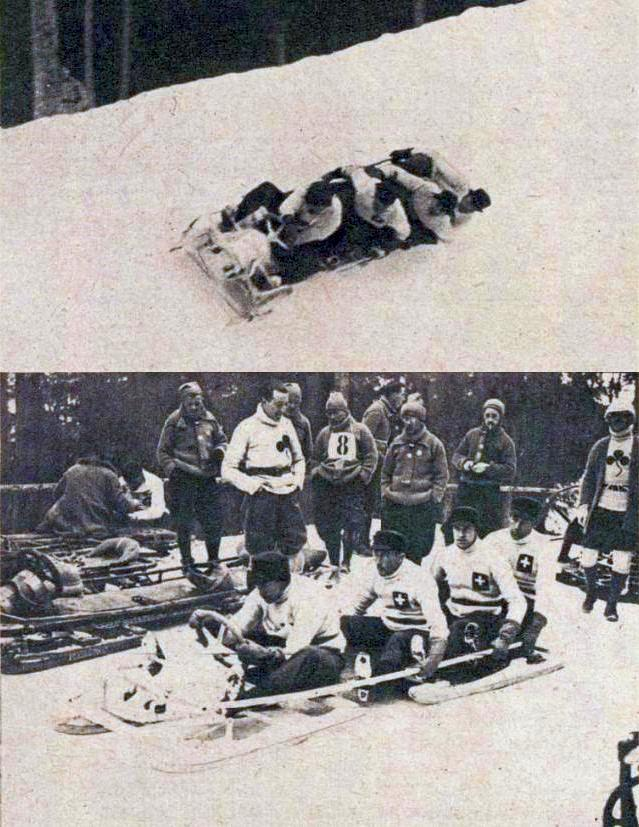

The Piste de Bobsleigh des Pellerins (Pellerins Bobsleigh Track in (in French)) was a bobsleigh track constructed for the 1924 Winter Olympics in Chamonix, France.

== Track statistics ==
The track was 1369.88 metres long with 19 curves and an elevation difference of 156.29 metres. Turns 1-2, 4-6, 8, 10, 12, and 14 have no names attached to them. Average grade for the track was 11.4%.

1924 track turn names
Turn Number	Name	Reason named
3.	Les Myrtilles	"The Bilberries" in French.
7.	Les Pouteretz	"The Beans" in French.
9.	Place Verte	"Sharp green place" in French
11.	L'Eau Noire	"Black water" in French
13.	J. Balmat	After Jacques Balmat, an Italian mountain climber who completed the first successful ascent of Mont Blanc in 1786 with fellow Italian Michel-Gabriel Paccard.
15.	Les Écureuils	"The Squirrels" in French
16.	Le Pylône	"The Mast" or "The Pylon" in French.
17., 18.	Tournants du Téléférique	"Aerial tramway" turning point in French. The track was located near the Ligne du téléférique de l'Aiguille du Midi which transported the bobsleighs from the bottom of the mountain to the top of the track 156.29 metres above.
19.	Arrivée	"Arrival" or "Finish" curve in French

During the bobsleigh competitions, a total of nine teams from five countries competed. Two teams withdrew after the first run while another team withdrew after the third run. The three medalist teams were from Switzerland (gold), Great Britain (silver), and Belgium (bronze). Bobsleigh speeds reached up to 115 km/h (71.5 mph) during competition.

The track is no longer in use. It was located near the Ligne du téléférique de l'Aiguille du Midi aerial tramway area, near the village of Les Pèlerins.
