= Westerton =

Westerton may refer to:

- Westerton, County Durham, England
- Westerton, East Dunbartonshire, Scotland
  - Westerton railway station
- Westerton, West Sussex, England
