= Galactocentric =

The Galactic Center is the barycenter of a galaxy. Galactocentric or galactocentrism can refer to:

- Galactocentrism, discredited cosmological model centered on the Milky Way.
- Galactocentric cylindrical polar coordinate, astronomical coordinate system.
- Galactocentric distance
- Galactocentric orbit
