= Alpenstock =

Long wooden pole with an iron spike tip used by walkers and mountain climbers

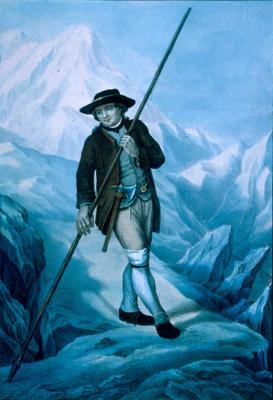
Jacques Balmat carrying an axe and an alpenstock

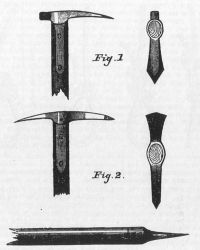
1872 diagram of an early ice axe, showing how the alpenstock was modified by the addition of a pick and an adze

An alpenstock (German: Alpen- "alpine" + Stock "stick, staff") is a long wooden pole with an iron spike tip, used by shepherds for travelling on snowfields and glaciers in the Alps since the Middle Ages. It is the antecedent of the modern ice axe.

French-speaking climbers called this item a "baton". Josias Simler, a Swiss professor of theology at what later became the University of Zurich, published the first treatise on the Alps, entitled De Alpibus commentarius. T. Graham Brown described Simler's observations on gear for travel over ice and snow in the mountains: "In 1574, Simler published a commentary on the Alps which is remarkable for its description of the technique of glacier travel and for its proof that Simler himself had practical experience. He describes the alpenstock, crampons, the use of the rope, the necessity of protecting the eyes on snow by veils or spectacles; and he mentions that the leader on snow covered glaciers sounds for hidden crevasses with a pole."

Yvon Chouinard quotes Simler as writing, "To counteract the slipperiness of the ice, they firmly attach to their feet shoes resembling the shoes of horses, with three sharp spikes in them, so that they may be able to stand firmly. In some places, they use sticks tipped with iron, by leaning upon which they climb steep slopes. These are called alpine sticks, and are principally in use among the shepherds."

On August 8, 1786, Jacques Balmat and Michel-Gabriel Paccard made the first ascent of Mont Blanc. Balmat, a chamois hunter and crystal collector, had experience with high mountain travel, and Paccard had made previous attempts to climb the peak. Illustrations show Balmat carrying two separate tools (whose respective functions would later be re-assigned to the ice axe): an alpenstock (or baton), and a small axe that could be used to chop steps on icy slopes.

In the second half of the nineteenth century, seeing that the traditional but unwieldy alpenstock might be a useful aid to climb steep slopes of snow or ice, Victorian alpinists fastened a sharpened blade (the pick) to the top of the alpenstock; this was used to provide stability. On the opposite end, a flattened blade was placed (the adze), which was used for cutting steps in the snow or ice, an essential technique for moving over steep icy slopes before the advent of modern crampons with front points. Gradually, the alpenstock evolved into the ice axe.

== Literary references ==
- In Jules Verne's novel Twenty Thousand Leagues Under the Seas (1869–1870), the narrator (Professor Pierre Aronnax) relates how he and Captain Nemo were able to walk on the muddy bottom of the Atlantic Ocean using their alpenstocks.
- In Henry James's short story "Daisy Miller" (1878), Randolph Miller carries an alpenstock when he meets Winterbourne. The alpenstock, being of phallic shape, may allude to the tension between Winterbourne and Randolph's sister Daisy upon meeting.
- The cover of Mark Twain's 1880 first edition of A Tramp Abroad depicts a man walking with an alpenstock. Twain encountered the alpenstock when visiting Lucerne, Switzerland. He described the alpenstock as ubiquitous among locals and popular among tourists as mementos.

Most of the people, both male and female, are in walking costume, and carry alpenstocks. Evidently, it is not considered safe to go about in Switzerland, even in town, without an alpenstock. If the tourist forgets and comes down to breakfast without his alpenstock, he goes back and gets it, and stands it up in the corner. When his touring in Switzerland is finished, he does not throw that broomstick away, but lugs it home with him, to the far corners of the earth, although this costs him more trouble and bother than a baby or a courier could. You see, the alpenstock is his trophy; his name is burned upon it; and if he has climbed a hill, or jumped a brook, or traversed a brickyard with it, he has the names of those places burned upon it, too.

- Sherlock Holmes carries an alpenstock when climbing near the Gemmi Pass and at the Reichenbach Falls in Switzerland. This is during Holmes' and Dr Watson's flight from Professor Moriarty in "The Final Problem", published in 1893.
- The short story, "An Alpine Divorce", by Canadian author Robert Barr from 1896 references an alpinestock near the climax of the story.
- In the humorous book Three Men on the Bummel, by Jerome K. Jerome (1900), the narrator describes seeing a man and a woman, who seem to be English tourists, incongruously using alpenstocks in Dresden Railway Station. This may be a joking reference to the stereotype of them being popular with foreign visitors.
- In Vladimir Nabokov's last novel, Ada or Ardor: A Family Chronicle (1969), the main character, Van Veen, beats the blackmailer Kim Beauharnais with an alpenstock until he is blind.
