= Baird Auditorium =

Auditorium in Washington, DC

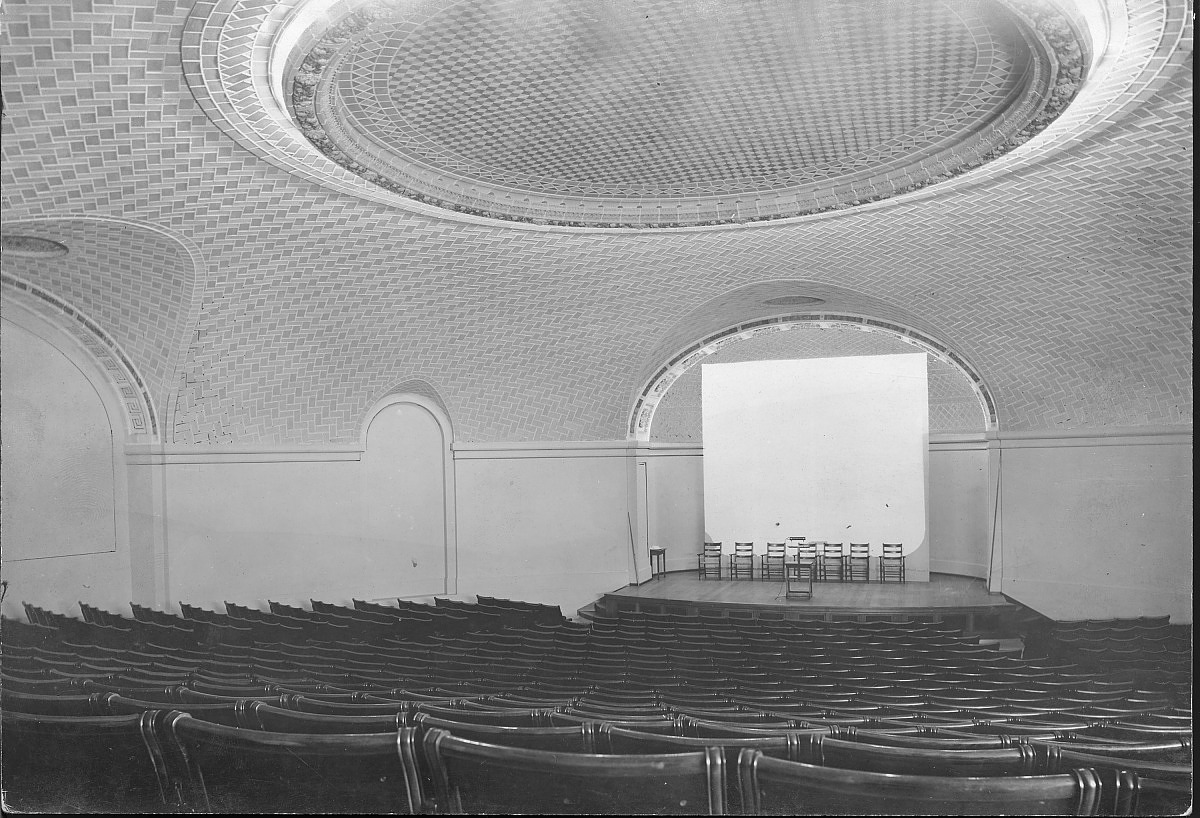
- Photograph by: Unknown, circa 1911. View of the newly completed Baird Auditorium, looking towards the stage, in the new National Museum Building, now known as the National Museum of Natural History. The auditorium is located under the Rotunda. The elegant classically inspired room features a domed ceiling of Guastavino tiles.

General information
- Architectural style: Beaux-Arts
- Location: 10th St. & Constitution Ave. NW, Washington, DC 20560, United States, Washington, D.C., United States
- Owner: Smithsonian Institution

Other information
- Seating capacity: 530

The Baird Auditorium is a multi-purpose 530-seat venue located on the ground floor of the Smithsonian Institution's National Museum of Natural History in Washington, D.C..

== History ==
As one of the oldest public performance venues and lecture halls at the Smithsonian, the Baird Auditorium's history of events is as diverse as the Smithsonian itself. Located beneath the National Museum of Natural History's rotunda, the Baird Auditorium is named for the second Secretary of the Smithsonian Spencer Fullerton Baird. The auditorium's bronze plaque recognizing Baird was laid on February 9, 1916.

=== Architecture ===
In the planning phase for the new 'National Museum Building,' Smithsonian staff conveyed desire for a lecture hall and an auditorium was added to architects Hornblower & Marshall's plan in 1903. The original seating capacity of the auditorium was 565 seats.

The Baird Auditorium was completed in 1909, designed and built by the R. Guastavino Company under the direction of Rafael Guastavino. The Baird Auditorium is one of the finest examples of the Guastavino tile arch system, inspired by the Catalan vault, in the United States. The American Institute of Architects calls the Baird Auditorium the museum's "greatest interior space." According to architectural scholar Dr. John Ochsendorf, the Baird Auditorium's "daring geometry" in tile construction by the Guastavino company "spans 90 feet (27 meters) with a remarkable shallow dome in acoustical tile, and could only have been built by a company with decades of experience in tile vaulting."

The pilaster bases for the Baird's walls are made of pink Tennessee marble, with the auditorium floor finished primarily in terrazzo. As Richard Rathbun, the Assistant Secretary of the Smithsonian Institution in Charge of the United States National Museum, describes, "The pilaster lines are recalled by border lines of pink Tennessee and Sienna marbles enclosing panels of terrazzo."

In 2020, the Grunley Construction Company, Inc. undertook exterior building renovations to the National Museum of Natural History's National Mall entrances to make them wheelchair accessibility-friendly, as well as a complete retrofit of the Baird's HVAC system.

== Notable speaking engagements ==
=== Science ===
The Baird Auditorium was the location of the 'Great Debate' in the field of astronomy, also called the "Shapley–Curtis Debate", on April 26, 1920, on the topics of spiral nebulae and the size of the universe. NASA educational resources describe the Baird debate: "It is now clear that a once little-heard-of discussion was at the crux of a major change of humanity's view of our place in the universe;" and, Dr. Frank She claims that the "debate illustrates forcefully how tricky it is to pick one's way successfully through the treacherous ground that characterized research at the frontiers of science." Astrophysicist Robert Nemiroff organized a 75th anniversary event where Polish astronomer Bohdan Paczynski and University of Chicago astrophysicist Donald Q Lamb debated "The Distance Scale to Gamma Ray Bursts" in the Baird Auditorium.

=== Arts and culture ===
On October 31, 1933, African American writer and philosopher Alain Locke gave a lecture and screened films from the Harmon Foundation as part of the Smithsonian exhibition, "Exhibition of Works by Negro Artists," and sponsored by Carter G. Woodson's Association for the Study of Negro Life and History. (At the time the National Mall was a desegregated area of Washington, making the Baird one of the few racially integrated theatres prior to the National Theatre's desegregation in May 1952.) According to VCU professor Tobias Wofford, "On Woodson's invitation, Locke delivered a slide lecture to the ASNLH congregants in the auditorium adjacent to the exhibition space. The lecture explored the links between African and African American art." While Locke's "address was noted prominently by most of the accounts of the exhibition," Locke himself viewed it as participating in "a reaction of racial vanity." Seventy-nine years later on October 31, 2012, six-time world champion boxer and Olympic gold medalist Sugar Ray Leonard spoke on the same stage in a conversation with former Washington Redskins and Washington Senators stadium announcer, Phil Hochberg.

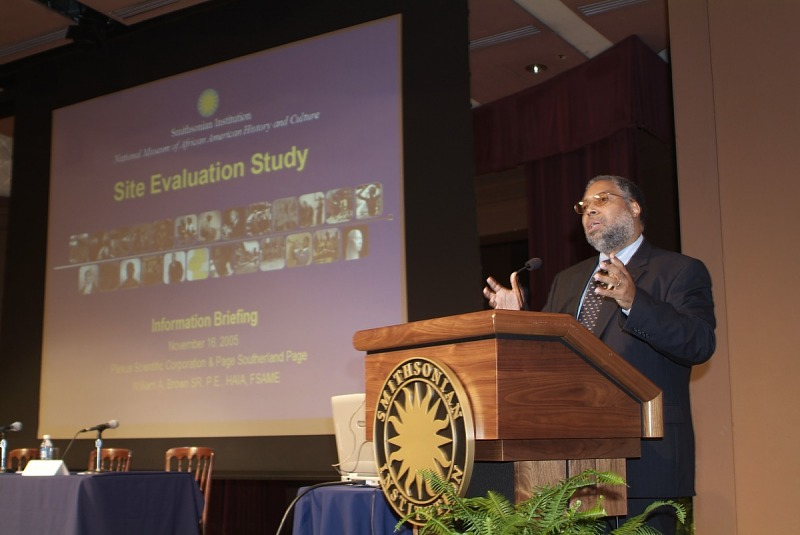
Lonnie Bunch, Director, speaking in 2005.

== Performances ==
The Baird Auditorium has a long and illustrious history of musical performances. As early as 1914 the Baird was used for "Friday Morning Music Club" performances that celebrated American music.

=== "Jazz at the Smithsonian" ===
Blues singer Alberta Hunter performed at the Baird on several occasions during her late-1970s 'comeback' career period, including: on January 7, 1977, and in a filmed performance on November 29, 1981, which received commercial home video release as, "Alberta Hunter: Jazz at the Smithsonian," originally released in 1982.

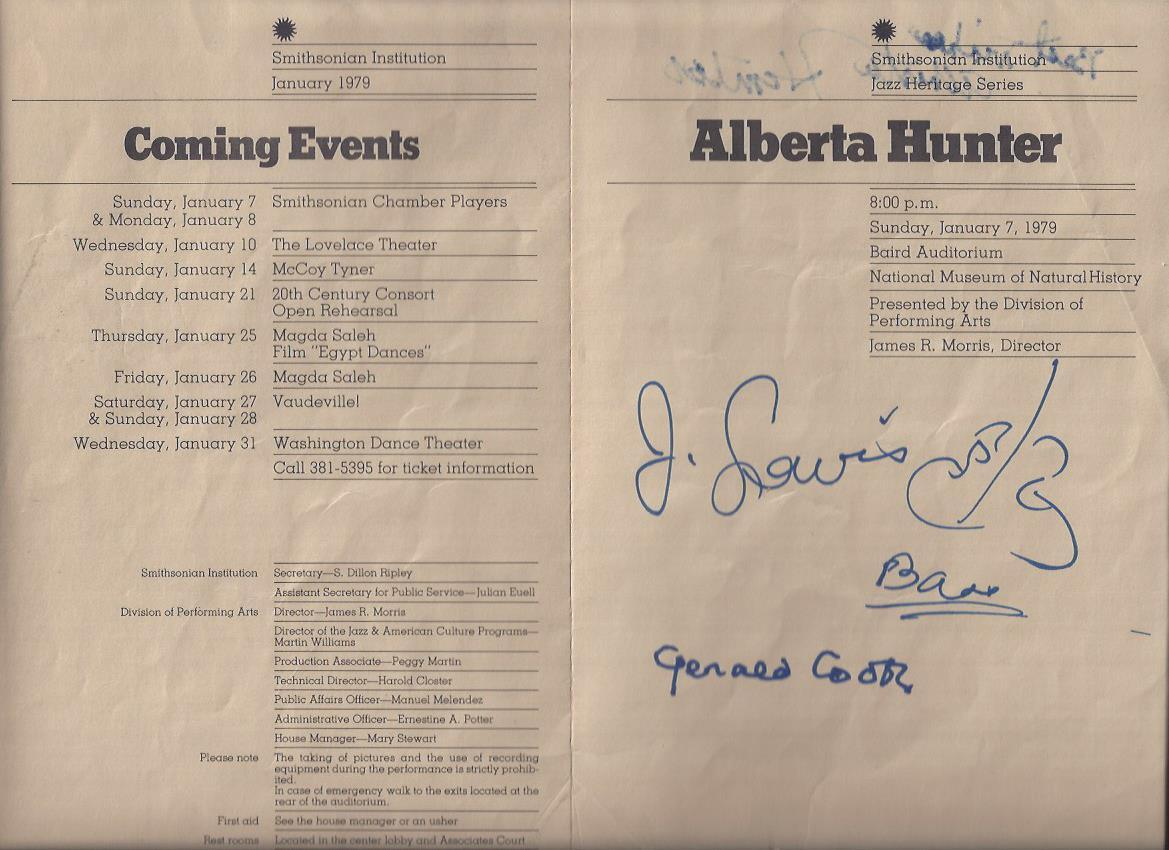
Smithsonian Institution, Jazz Heritage Program for Alberta Hunter's January 7, 1979 performance at the Baird Auditorium.

=== Country music performances ===
Mother Maybelle Carter performed in the Baird just three years before her death, accompanied by her daughter Helen Carter Jones, her grandson David Carter Jones, Mike Seeger, and Ralph Rinzler, on May 18, 1975; National Public Radio recorded the performance as "Folk Festival USA," part of the Smithsonian's "Women in Country Music" series. Merle Travis gave a country guitar music concert in the Baird Auditorium on October 23, 1976. On June 2, 1978, the "Texas Troubador" Ernest Tubb performed as part of the Smithsonian's American Country Music series.

In 1979 the Sons of the Pioneers were honored with a "National Treasure" designation by the Smithsonian Division of Performing Arts, which hosted a performance by the group in the Baird Auditorium.

=== Other notable musical performances ===
In early February 1977, Muddy Waters performed in the Baird as part of the Smithsonian Institution's blues series presented by the Division of Performing Arts. Pete Seeger and Sweet Honey in the Rock performed an evening of "protest songs from Colonial times to today," together on the Baird's stage on January 8, 1978.

In 1990 Bill Kirchner, a Jazztimes Critics' Poll "Best Emerging Jazz Arranger" winner, performed "Yes, Yes, Nonet!" with a nine-member orchestra.

Jazz great Wynton Marsalis performed a Young People's Concert in the Baird Auditorium with the Wynton Marsalis Septet on June 7, 1994.

David Byrne promoted his 2012 book, "How Music Works," with a talk held in the Baird Auditorium on October 1, 2012.
