= Great Debate (astronomy) =

1920 debate between Harlow Shapley and Heber Curtis on whether there were other galaxies

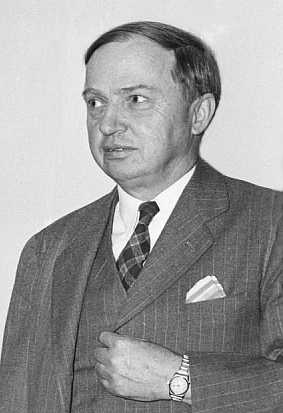
Harlow Shapley (1885 –1972)

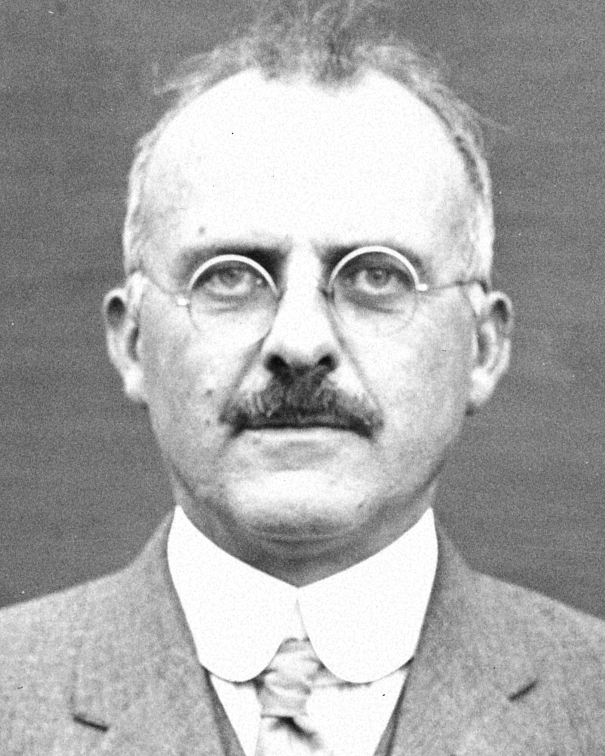
Heber Doust Curtis (1872–1942)

The Great Debate, also called the Shapley–Curtis Debate, was held on 26 April 1920 at the U.S. National Museum in Washington, D.C. (Note: later became the Smithsonian Museum of Natural History) between the astronomers Harlow Shapley and Heber Curtis. It concerned the nature of so-called spiral nebulae and the size of the universe. Shapley believed that these nebulae were relatively small and lay within the outskirts of the Milky Way Galaxy (then thought to be the center or entirety of the universe), while Curtis held that they were in fact independent galaxies, implying that they were exceedingly large and distant. A year later the two sides of the debate were presented and expanded on in independent technical papers under the title "The Scale of the Universe".

In the aftermath of the public debate, scientists have been able to verify individual pieces of evidence from both astronomers, but on the main point of the existence of other galaxies, Curtis has been proven correct.

== The format ==
The debate was the topic of that year's William Ellery Hale lecture during a meeting of the National Academy of Sciences in the Baird Auditorium of the U.S. National Museum in Washington, D.C.(now the Smithsonian Museum of Natural History). Most of the Academy members in attendance that night were not astronomers. The topics considered for that year's meeting included Einstein's theory of relativity, glaciers, and even zoological or biological subjects, before a debate on "The Distance Scale of the Universe" was chosen. Shapley and Curtis agreed to a format where each would present their opposing views in back-to-back 40-minute lectures. Shapley worked from a typed script and presented a general background introduction to astronomy before going on to his views on the size of the universe. Curtis worked from a set of notes and presented his lecture points in type written projected photographic slides.

No transcript of the debate exists; its content has been pieced together over the years from Shapley's original annotated typewritten script, Curtis's slides (his script was discarded after the lecture), and both participants' letters.

== The debate ==
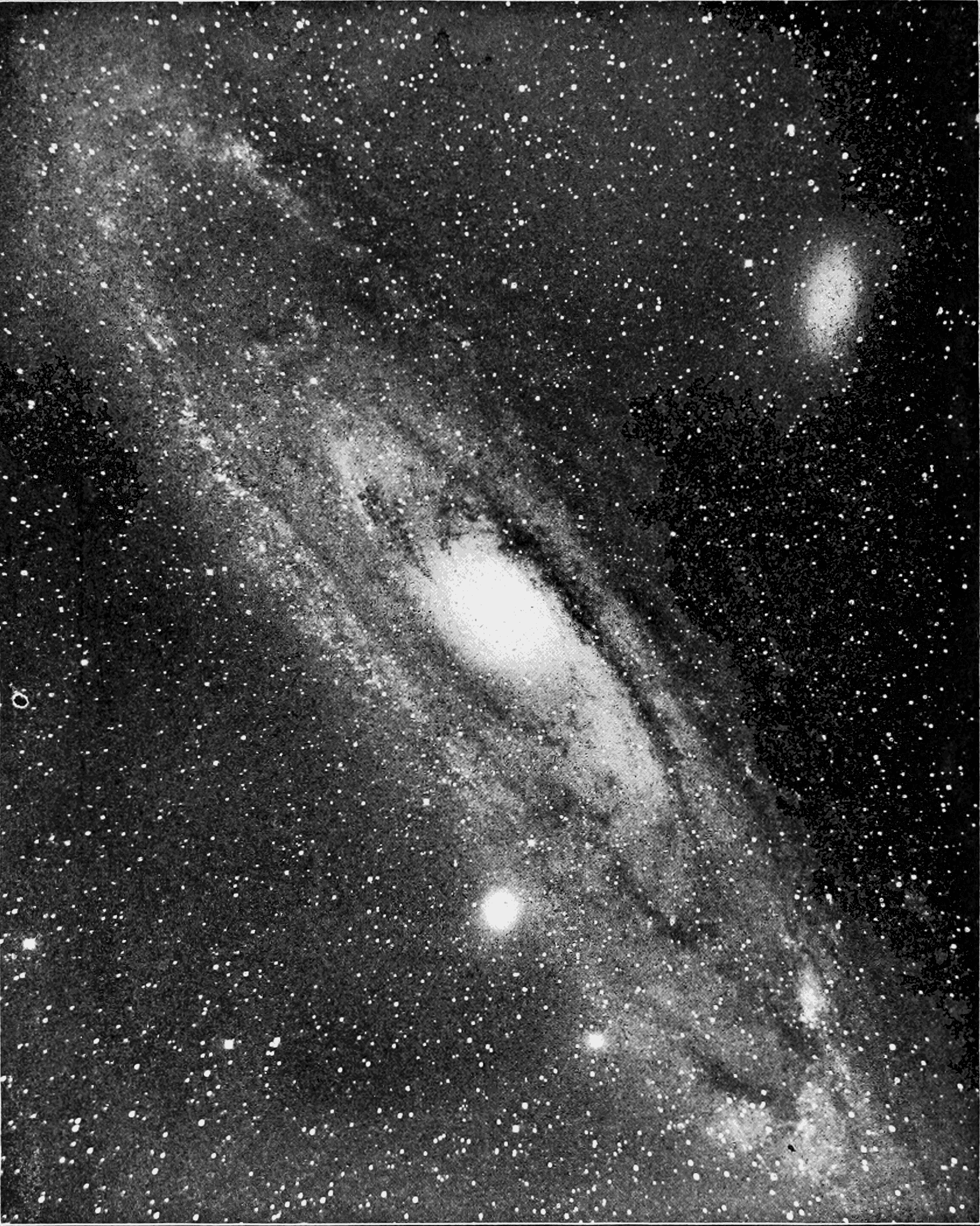
The "Great Spiral Nebula" in the constellation Andromeda (1902 photograph). The Debate was over whether this was a cloud of gas and dust or a distant galaxy.

Shapley presented the case that the Milky Way is the entirety of the Universe. In his astronomical work he had been coming up with estimates for the size of the Milky Way using globular clusters and the Cepheid variables found within them. He presented the audience with a "universe" 300,000 light-years in diameter with the Sun off to one side. He spent most of his lecture describing the vast size of the Milky Way and towards the end argued that "spiral nebulae" such as Andromeda were simply objects on the edge of the Milky Way itself. He backed up this claim by appealing to their relative sizes—if Andromeda and other spiral nebulae were not part of the Milky Way but were in fact similar island universes, then, given the vast size of the Milky Way, the distance to them would be a span most contemporary astronomers would not accept.

Curtis, on the other hand, described a Milky Way 30,000 light-years across, one tenth the size of the one postulated by Shapley, and contended that Andromeda and other such "nebulae" were similarly smaller separate galaxies, or "island universes" (a term invented by the 18th-century philosopher Immanuel Kant, who also argued that the "spiral nebulae" were extragalactic). He showed that there were more novae in Andromeda than in the Milky Way. From this, he could ask why there were more novae in one small section of the Milky Way than the other sections of the Milky Way, if Andromeda were not a separate galaxy but simply a nebula within Earth's galaxy. This led to supporting Andromeda as a separate galaxy with its own signature age and rate of nova occurrences. Curtis also noted the large radial velocities of spiral nebulae that suggested they could not be gravitationally bound to the Milky Way in a single island universe model. Curtis pointed out a similarity in structure that explained why there were no spiral nebulae visible along the plane of the Milky Way (referred to as the Zone of Avoidance); both the Milky Way and the spiral nebulae had similar dust clouds along their plane, and that dust in the Milky Way blocked our view of the spiral nebulae.

== The followup paper ==
In a May 1921 issue of the Bulletin of the National Research Council Harlow Shapley and Heber Curtis sides of the debate were presented and expanded on in independent technical papers under the title "The Scale of the Universe". Shapley and Curtis were able to read each other's paper and edit their final published papers so that they could present more refined counterarguments.

Expanding on his comments at the debate, Shapley argued that "spiral nebulae" such as Andromeda were simply part of the Milky Way. He backed up this claim by appealing to their relative sizes—if Andromeda were not part of the Milky Way, then its distance must have been on the order of 10^{8} light years—a span most contemporary astronomers would not accept. Shapley's paper cited the work of Adriaan van Maanen, a well-respected astronomer of the time, as providing evidence supporting Shapley's argument. Van Maanen had claimed he had observed the Pinwheel Galaxy rotating, and that if the Pinwheel Galaxy were in fact a distinct galaxy and could be observed to be rotating on a timescale of years, its orbital velocity would be enormous and there would be a violation of the universal speed limit, the speed of light in vacuum. Shapley also backed up his claims with the observation of a nova in 1885 in the Andromeda "nebula" that had briefly outshone the entire nebula, constituting a seemingly impossible output of energy were Andromeda in fact a separate galaxy.

Curtis replied to Shapley's points noting that, if the Milky Way and other spirals were relatively small, the difference in nova brightness would fall into line with accepted values. He wrote that the brightness of the 1885 nova in Andromeda was an outlier and he thought the existence of two classes of nova were not impossible. He also wrote in his paper that rotational of spiral nebula measured by van Maanen was so small (less than 25 years of observations trying to measure extremely small rotation of a nebulous object), the findings could not be trusted.

== Aftermath ==
Later in the 1920s, Edwin Hubble showed that Andromeda was far outside the Milky Way by measuring Cepheid variable stars, proving that Curtis was correct. It is now known that the Milky Way is only one of as many as an estimated 200 billion (2×10^{11}) to 2 trillion (2×10^{12}) or more galaxies in the observable Universe. Also, astronomers generally accept that the nova Shapley referred to in his arguments was in fact a supernova, which does indeed temporarily outshine the combined output of an entire galaxy. On other points, the results were mixed (the actual size of the Milky Way is in between the sizes proposed by Shapley and Curtis), or in favor of Shapley (the Sun was near the center of the galaxy in Curtis's model, while Shapley correctly placed the Sun in the outer regions of the galaxy).

It later became apparent that van Maanen's observations were incorrect—one cannot actually see the Pinwheel Galaxy rotate during a human lifespan.

== Other Great Debates ==
The format of the great debate has been used subsequently to argue the nature of fundamental questions in astronomy. In honor of the first Great Debate's diamond jubilee (75th anniversary) in 1995 the Smithsonian hosted another debate on "The Distance Scale to Gamma-ray Bursts," between Bohdan Paczyński and Donald Q. Lamb. Two more anniversary debates followed in 1996 and 1998; and a fourth on the occasion of the debate's 100th anniversary in 2020.
