= Galactocentrism =

Discredited cosmological model, early 20th Century

In astronomy, galactocentrism is the theory that the Milky Way Galaxy, home of Earth's Solar System, is at or near the center of the Universe. The galactocentric model was the standard model of cosmology from the decline of heliocentrism onward, but was reliant on the assumption that the Milky Way is the only such galactic structure in the universe, surrounded by a starless void only occasionally populated by extragalactic nebulae.

Thomas Wright and Immanuel Kant first speculated that fuzzy patches of light called nebulae were actually distant "island universes" consisting of many stellar systems. The shape of the solar system's own parent galaxy was expected to resemble such "island universes," but "scientific arguments were marshalled against such a possibility," and this view was rejected by almost all scientists until Edwin Hubble's measurements in 1924.

William Herschel's heliocentric model of the universe, which was regarded as the standard model of cosmology in the 19th century, was overthrown by astronomer Harlow Shapley's work on globular clusters in 1918. Shapley's research marked the transition from heliocentrism to galactocentrism, placing the Galactic Center of the Milky Way Galaxy far away from the Sun, towards Sagittarius. Heber Doust Curtis and Edwin Hubble further refuted the heliocentric view of the universe by showing that spirals are themselves far-flung galactic systems. By 1925, the galactocentric model was established.

The theory of galactocentrism was an important step in the development of cosmological models as speculation on the existence of other galaxies, comparable in size and structure to the Milky Way, placed the Earth in its proper perspective with respect to the rest of the universe. Shifts from heliocentrism to galactocentrism and later acentrism have been compared in significance to the Copernican Revolution.

== Harlow Shapley and galactocentrism ==
Shapley had been studying the asymmetrical distribution of globular clusters, estimating the distance and location of individual objects by using variable stars as standard candles. Globular clusters contain many cepheid variable stars, whose precise relationship between luminosity and variability period was established by Henrietta Leavitt in 1908. Using cepheid and RR Lyrae variables to systematically chart the distribution of globular clusters, Shapley discovered that the stars in the Milky Way orbited a common center thousands of light years away from the Sun. The Galactic Center was determined to lie in the constellation Sagittarius, approximately 50,000 light-years from us.

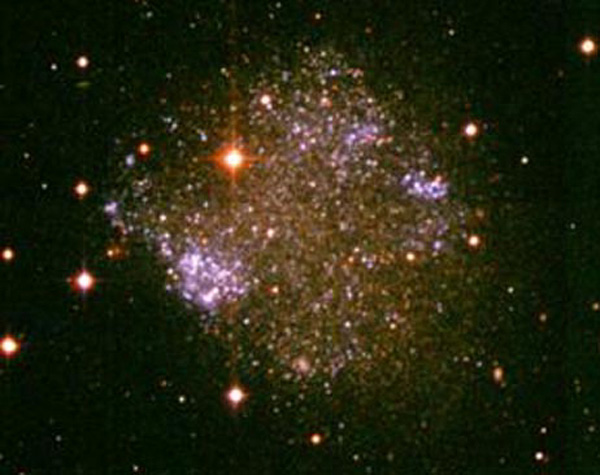
Sextans A, a member of the local group of galaxies, which includes the Andromeda and Milky Way spirals, Lowell Observatory, 2013

In 1920 Heber Doust Curtis and Harlow Shapley participated in the Great Debate on the nature of nebulae and galaxies, and the size of the universe. Shapley believed that distant nebulae were relatively small and lay within the Milky Way Galaxy. Curtis advocated the now-accepted view that nebulae were farther away, and that other galaxies apart from the Milky Way therefore existed. By 1925, Edwin Hubble had confirmed that many objects previously thought to be clouds of dust and gas and classified as "nebulae" were actually galaxies beyond the Milky Way.

"The realization, only a few decades ago, that our Galaxy is not unique and central in the universe ranks with the acceptance of the Copernican system as one of the great advances in cosmological thought." George O. Abell

When astronomers realized that starlight can be absorbed by clouds of gas and dust, infrared radiation was used to penetrate the dust clouds. Estimates dating after 2000 locate the Solar System within the range 24–28.4 kilolight-years (7.4–8.7 kiloparsecs) from the Galactic Center of the Milky Way galaxy.

== Shift from galactocentrism to acentrism ==
Hubble's observations of redshift in light from distant galaxies indicated that the universe was expanding and acentric. As a result, galactocentrism was abandoned in favor of the Big Bang model of the acentric expanding universe. Further assumptions, such as the Copernican principle, the cosmological principle, dark energy, and dark matter, eventually lead to the current model of cosmology, Lambda-CDM.
