= Westerton, County Durham =

Village in County Durham, England

Coordinates: 54.675°N 1.629°W

Westerton
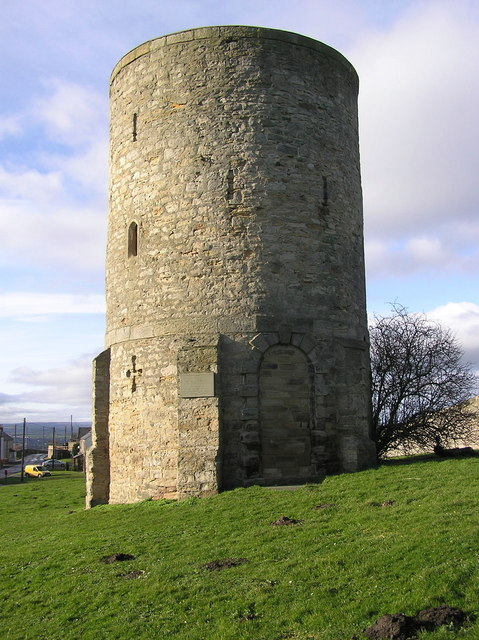
- Wright's Observatory/Folly

- Location within County Durham
- Population: 44 (2001 census)
- OS grid reference: NZ239311
- Unitary authority: County Durham
- Ceremonial county: Durham
- Region: North East
- Country: England
- Sovereign state: United Kingdom
- Post town: DARLINGTON
- Postcode district: DL14
- Police: Durham
- Fire: County Durham and Darlington
- Ambulance: North East

Westerton is a village and former civil parish in the County Durham district, in the ceremonial county of Durham, England. In the 2001 census Westerton had a population of 44. It is situated between Bishop Auckland and Spennymoor. It sits on top of a hill which is one of the highest points in County Durham, and is the location of an observatory built for Thomas Wright, who was the first person to suggest that the Milky Way consisted of a flattened disk of stars. The observatory is known today as "Wright's Folly".

== Civil parish ==
Westerton was formerly a township in the parish of Auckland-St. Andrew, from 1866 Westerton was a civil parish in its own right, on 1 April 1937 the parish was abolished and merged with Bishop Auckland, part also went to form Spennymoor. In 1931 the parish had a population of 524. For local government purposes today it is included in Coundon ward.
