= Jacques Balmat =

Savoyard mountaineer (1762-1834)

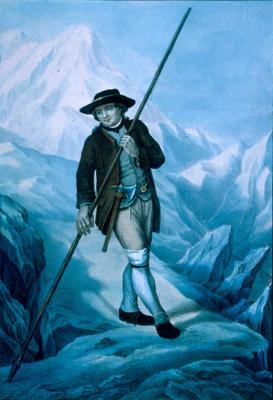
- Jacques Balmat on Mont Blanc with an alpenstock and an axe
- Born: 1762; Chamonix, Duchy of Savoy
- Died: 1834 (aged 71–72); Sixt Valley, Duchy of Savoy

Jacques Balmat (French pronunciation: [ʒak balma]), called Balmat du Mont Blanc (1762–1834) was a mountaineer, a Savoyard mountain guide, born in the Chamonix valley in Savoy. He is known for the first ascent of Mont Blanc with medical doctor Michel-Gabriel Paccard on 8 August 1786.

== Early life and education ==
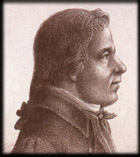
Jacques Balmat

Jacques Balmat was born in 1762 in the Chamonix valley in Savoy, at this time part of the Kingdom of Sardinia. He was a hunter and collector of crystals.

== Career ==
On 8 August 1786 Balmat completed the first ascent of Mont Blanc with physician Michel-Gabriel Paccard. For this feat, King Victor Amadeus III gave him the honorary title du Mont Blanc.

After the successful ascent, Balmat collected the reward offered 25 years before by Horace-Bénédict de Saussure to the first man who could climb Mont Blanc. Barely one year later on 3 August 1787 he assisted de Saussure himself to reach the summit with a party of about 17 people.

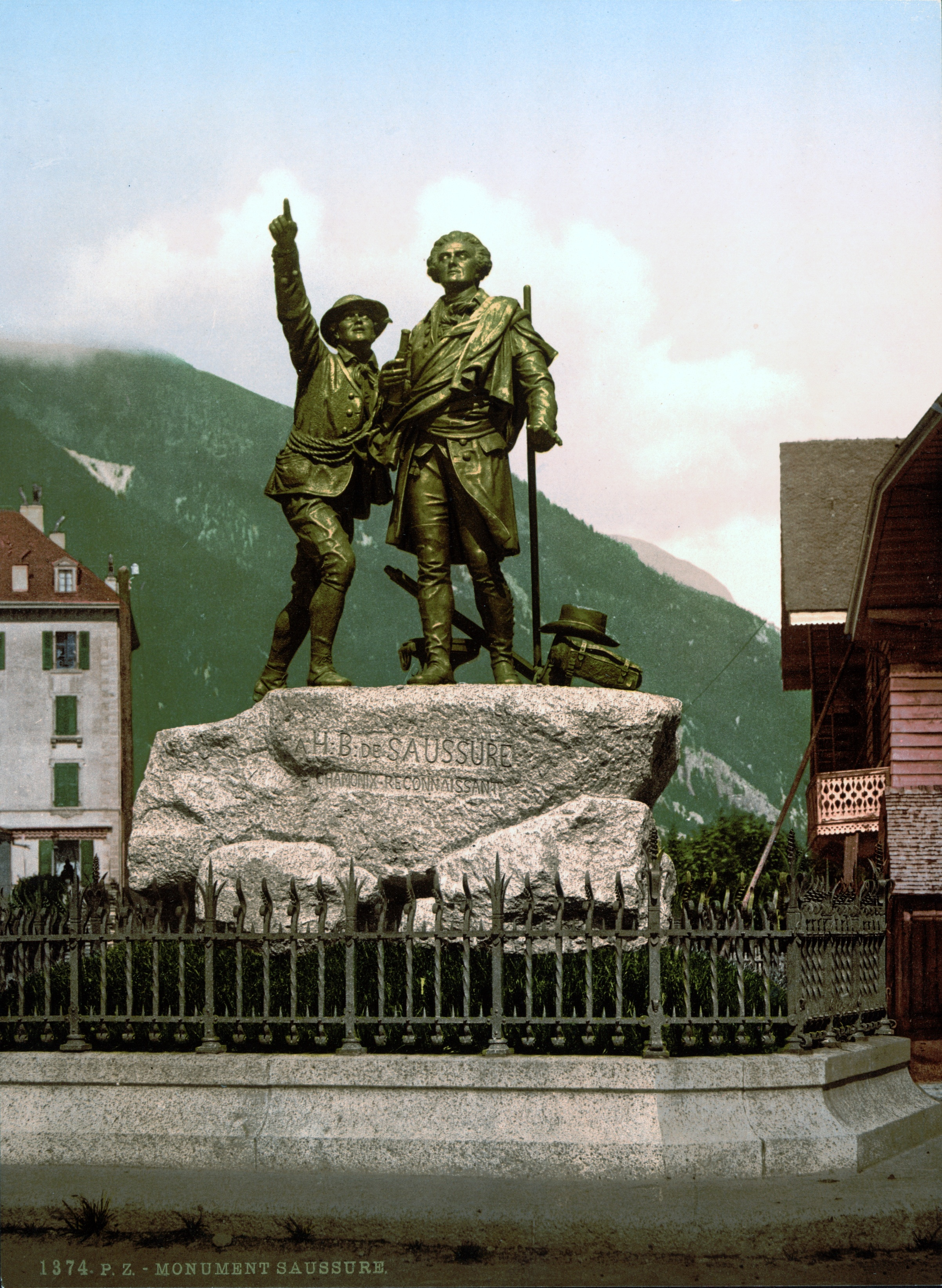
Horace-Bénédict de Saussure monument at Chamonix. Jacques Balmat is pointing at Mont Blanc.

During the Napoleonic Wars, Savoy fell under French control, and citizen Jacques Balmat became a member of the council of the commune. He led an unsuccessful attempt to introduce Merino sheep into the Chamonix valley.

== Personal life and death ==
Balmat died age 72 by falling off a cliff while prospecting for gold in the Sixt valley in 1834.

== Reception ==
C. Douglas Milner wrote "The ascent itself was magnificent; an amazing feat of endurance and sustained courage, carried through by these two men only, unroped and without ice axes, heavily burdened with scientific equipment and with long iron-pointed batons. The fortunate weather and a moon alone ensured their return alive." Milner described Balmat's story as "cloudily romantic and largely fictional" and quoted four analysts of mountaineering history who discovered errors in Balmat's version of events.

In 1966, Eric Shipton wrote "Theirs was an astounding achievement of courage and determination, one of the greatest in the annals of mountaineering. It was accomplished by men who were not only on unexplored ground but on a route that all the guides believed to be impossible." Shipton also described Balmat as "boastful and conceited" and that "in character, he was both vain and mean. Success went to his head, and he soon began to amplify his part in the exploit."

In 1975, Gaston Rébuffat praised Balmat's climbing abilities, describing him as "This man, robust, resolute, this crystal hunter who, as it turns out, possesses an extraordinary mountaineering sense, an unerring instinct for the crevasses and seracs of the glaciers ..."

Balmat was criticized for his autobiographical account of the climb, later published in English as Jacques Balmat, or The First Ascent of Mont Blanc, since his account downplayed the role of his companion Dr. Paccard.

== See also ==
- Marie Paradis (the first woman to climb Mont Blanc, in 1808)
