= Michel-Gabriel Paccard =

18/19th-century Sardinian physician and mountaineer

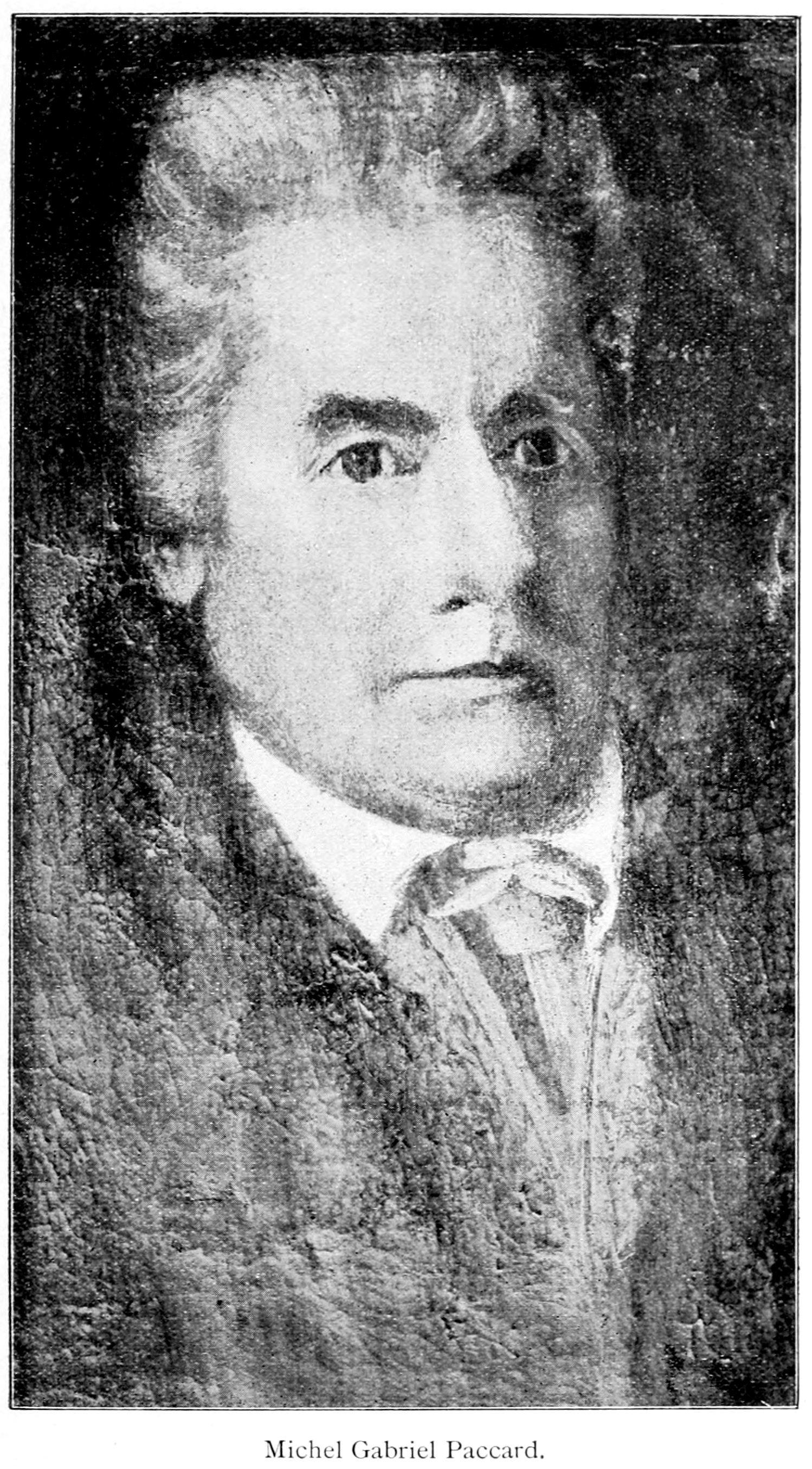
Portrait of Michel Gabriel Paccard. Reproduced from an old portrait in the possession of M. J. P, Cachat, of Chamonix (his great grandson). From a photograph by Tairraz, of Chamonix

Michel Gabriel Paccard (French pronunciation: [miʃɛl ɡabʁijɛl pakaʁ]; 1757–1827) was a Savoyard medical doctor and alpinist, citizen of the Kingdom of Sardinia.

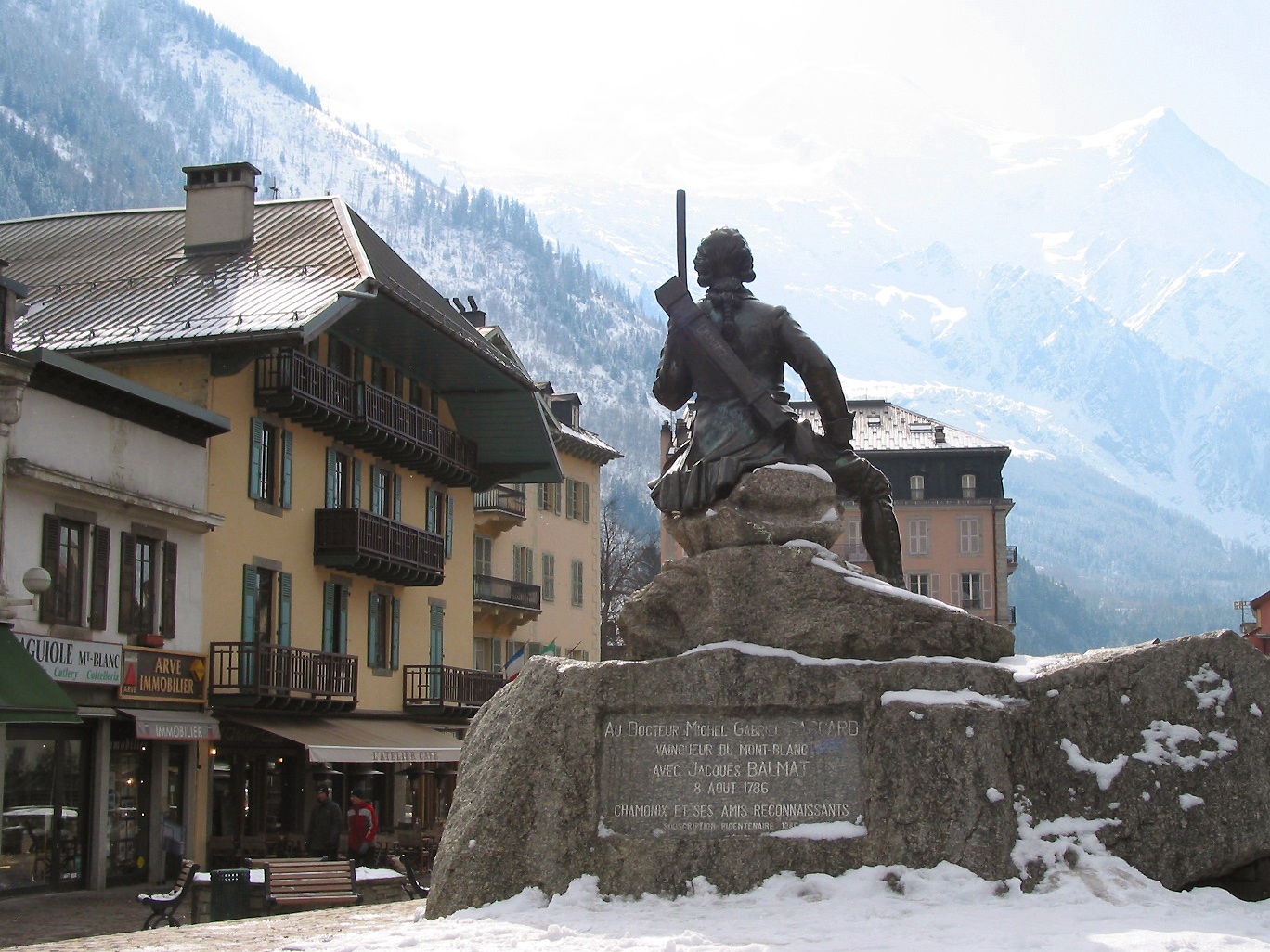
Michel-Gabriel Paccard – Monument erected at Chamonix.

== Life ==
Born in Chamonix, he studied medicine in Turin. Due to his passion for botany and minerals, he met Horace-Bénédict de Saussure, who initiated the race to be the first to ascend Mont Blanc.

In 1975 Gaston Rébuffat wrote "Like Saussure a devotee of the natural sciences, he has a dream: to carry a barometer to the summit and take a reading there. An excellent mountaineer, he has already made several attempts."

Paccard had a first, unsuccessful, attempt in 1783 with Marc Theodore Bourrit. In 1784, he made several attempts with Jacques Balmat before they made the first ascent of Mont Blanc together on 8 August 1786.

Paccard later married Jacques Balmat's sister, and became a justice of the peace.

== Reception ==
Balmat and Paccard's ascent of Mont Blanc was a major accomplishment in the early history of mountaineering. C. Douglas Milner wrote "The ascent itself was magnificent; an amazing feat of endurance and sustained courage, carried through by these two men only, unroped and without ice axes, heavily burdened with scientific equipment and with long iron-pointed batons. The fortunate weather and a moon alone ensured their return alive."

Eric Shipton wrote "Theirs was an astounding achievement of courage and determination, one of the greatest in the annals of mountaineering. It was accomplished by men who were not only on unexplored ground but on a route that all the guides believed to be impossible."

There is a statue of him in Chamonix.
