= Venance Payot =

French naturalist (1826–1902)

Venance Payot (pronounced [vənɑ̃s pajo]; June 26, 1826 – March 13, 1902) was a naturalist, glaciologist, alpine mountain-guide, scholar, author, and two-time mayor of Chamonix, France. He published a wide range of early scientific literature relating to the mountains of the Mont Blanc massif and undertook some of the earliest continued measurements of the movement of glaciers within that mountain range. He has been posthumously credited in mountaineering literature with being the youngest person (as of 1843) to have climbed Mont Blanc, and would have been sixteen years old at the time; other sources have challenged this.

== Personal life ==
Payot was born in Chamonix on June 26, 1826. He was the seventh child of his mother, Marie Pierrette Simond (1797–1852). His father was Pierre-Joseph Payot (1791–1858), who was a mountain guide and who led the writer Alexandre Dumas on a journey to the Mer de Glace, accompanied by the young Venance.

Payot died in Chamonix on March 13, 1902, leaving behind at least one son, Paul.

== Mountain guide ==
Payot first became a porter, helping to carry the provisions and equipment of clients and guides into the mountains, and then became an aspirant (trainee) guide. He was then accepted into the Chamonix guides company (Compagnie des Guides de Chamonix), receiving his certificate of admission on 11 May 1852.

=== Youngest ascent of Mont Blanc ===
Payot has been reported in respected 20th-century mountaineering literature as being the youngest person at that time to have reached the summit of Mont Blanc. In 1843, and at the age of 16, he is stated to have been amongst a party which reached the summit of Mont Blanc. However, one source states that he was the leader of the party, whilst another source subsequently cast doubt on this accolade, suggesting the inclusion of Venance Payot's name as leader of the party could have resulted from confusion between the names of V. Payot and H. Jacot in a published account.

== Naturalist ==
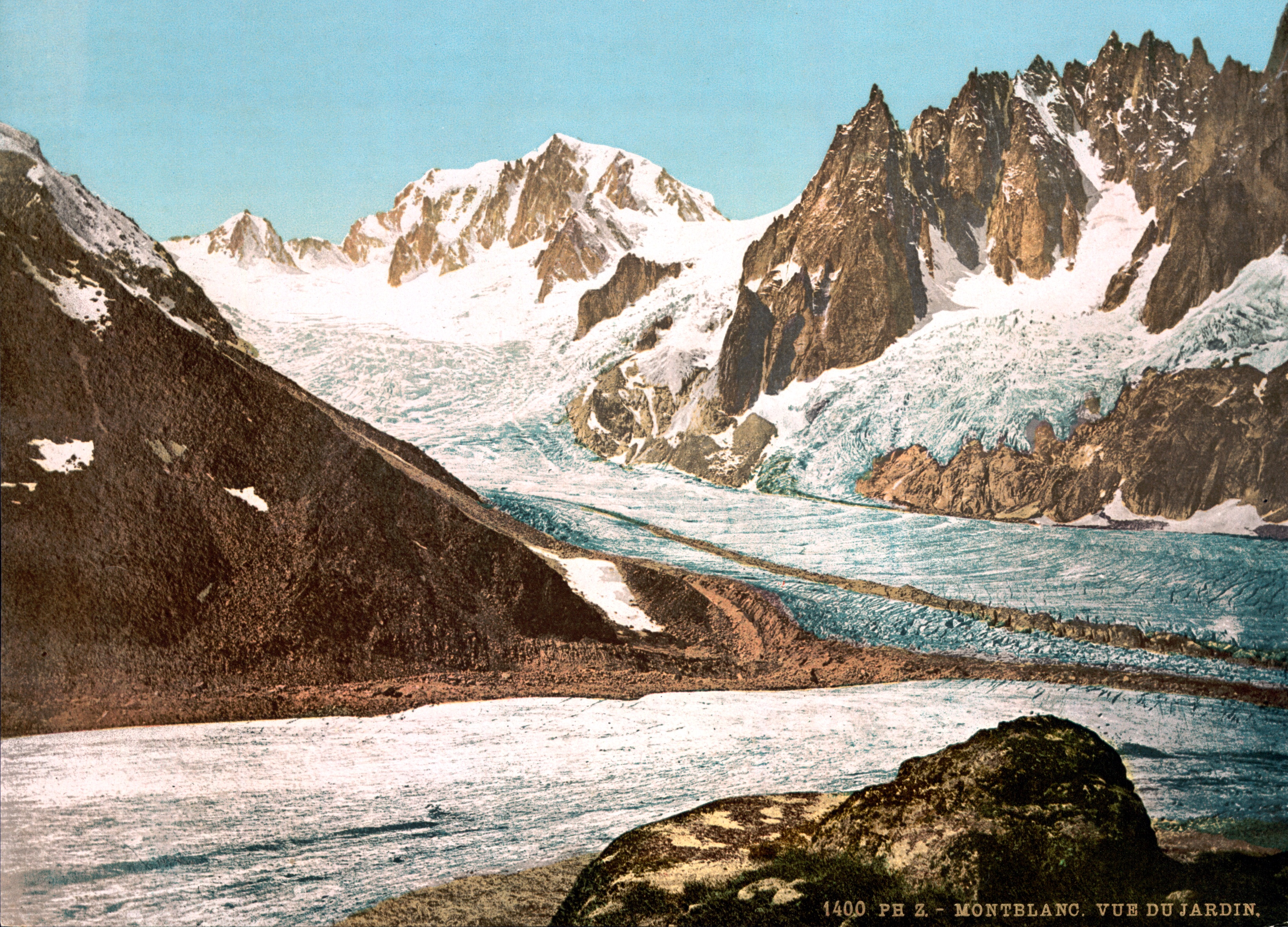
View of the "Garden" on the glacier du Talefre, Mont Blanc, whose plants were studied by Payot.

He was an avid collector of minerals, rocks and plants, and came to be a renowned naturalist. Some of the carefully labelled specimens he amassed are now in Château d'Annecy and in the Chamonix Alpine Museum. He also built up a collection of books on the natural sciences and later donated some 385 items to Annecy Library, along with a 2,000 franc sum to maintain and expand it.

He was a member of the Association Florimontane d'Annecy, founded in 1607, and contributed articles to that association's journal of research in the Savoy region. Payot made many botanical studies of the mountains of the Mont Blanc massif, publishing numerous academic books or pamphlets on the subject, including vascular plants, ferns, bryophytes, and herpetology.

== Geologist ==
Payot published the first systematic account of the minerals of the Mont Blanc area in 1873. His list, titled "Statistique minéralogique des environs du Mt–Blanc", catalogued 90 mineral types.

== Glaciologist ==
In 1861, Payot published the first account of bodies lost in a glacier in the Mont Blanc range being rediscovered 40 years later and some 3,000 metres (9,800 ft) lower down from the point where they were lost. Payot's studies of the glaciers of the Mont Blanc massif resulted in his being named among some of the first glaciologists, along with the likes of Tyndall, Forbes, and Agassiz.

== Local politician ==
Payot was twice mayor of the town of Chamonix: between 1863 and 1864, and between 1881 and 1882. He later obtained a seat on the Haute-Savoie borough council from 1892 to 1898.

In 1866 he worked to install a new wooden refuge for climbers attempting to climb Mont Blanc via the Grand Mulets route.

In 1892 he was at the forefront of a campaign to stop the construction of the Montenvers Railway (from Chamonix to Montenvers) near the Mer de Glace. He argued that it would not attract tourists to the town, but would adversely affect the town's economy by taking trade away from the mule owners and porters who had previously taken visitors and their belongings up the mountain path.

== Honours ==
In 2006 a book was published containing photographs of over 90 of Payot's original, hand-labelled plant specimens.

== Selected publications ==
- Herbier des Alpes, ou collection de plantes alpines recueillies dans les montagnes de Chamonix qui avoisinent le Mont- Blanc, by Venance Payot and Louis Coppier, Bonneville : A. Chavin, 1844.
- Guide du botaniste au Jardin de la Mer de glace, Geneva, 1854.
- Guide-itinéraire au Mont-Blanc, à Chamonix et dans les vallées voisines, Geneva : C. Gruaz; Chamonix, 1857
- Catalogue des fougères, prêles et lycopodiacées des environs du Mont-Blanc…, Paris : Cherbuliez, 1860.
- Erpétologie, malacologie et paléontologie des environs du Mont-Blanc, Lyon : impr de Barret, 1864.
- Lithologie – catalogue de la série des roches de la chaîne du Mont-Blanc, 3rd edition. Genève : impr. Soullier et Wirth, 1872.
- Géologie et minéralogie des environs du Mont-Blanc, Geneva : H.Georg, 1873.
- Guide du botaniste ou catalogue des plantes rares de la Suisse française, Lausanne : impr. Vue S. Genton and Sons, 1878.
- Florule du Mont-Blanc : guide du botaniste et du touriste dans les Alpes Pennines, Paris : Sandoz and Thuillier, 18... 1886 . 3 volumes : 1 Phanerogams; 2 Cryptogams; 3 Bryophytes.
- Oscillations des quatre grands glaciers de la vallée de Chamonix et énumération des ascensionnistes au Mont-Blanc…, Genève, J.Sandoz, 1879
- Description pétrographique des roches des terrains cristallins primaires et sédimentaires du massif de la chaîne du Mont-Blanc…, Geneva : impr. Richter, 1885
- Excursion au Mont Lachat et au pavillon de Bellevue, 1895
- Statistique minéralogique et pétrographique des roches de la chaîne du Mont-Blanc. Lyon : impr. L. Jacquet, 1895.
- Énumération des lichens des roches des Grands Mulets. Genève : impr. Romet, 1899.
