= Le Buet station =

Railway station in Vallorcine, France

Le Buet
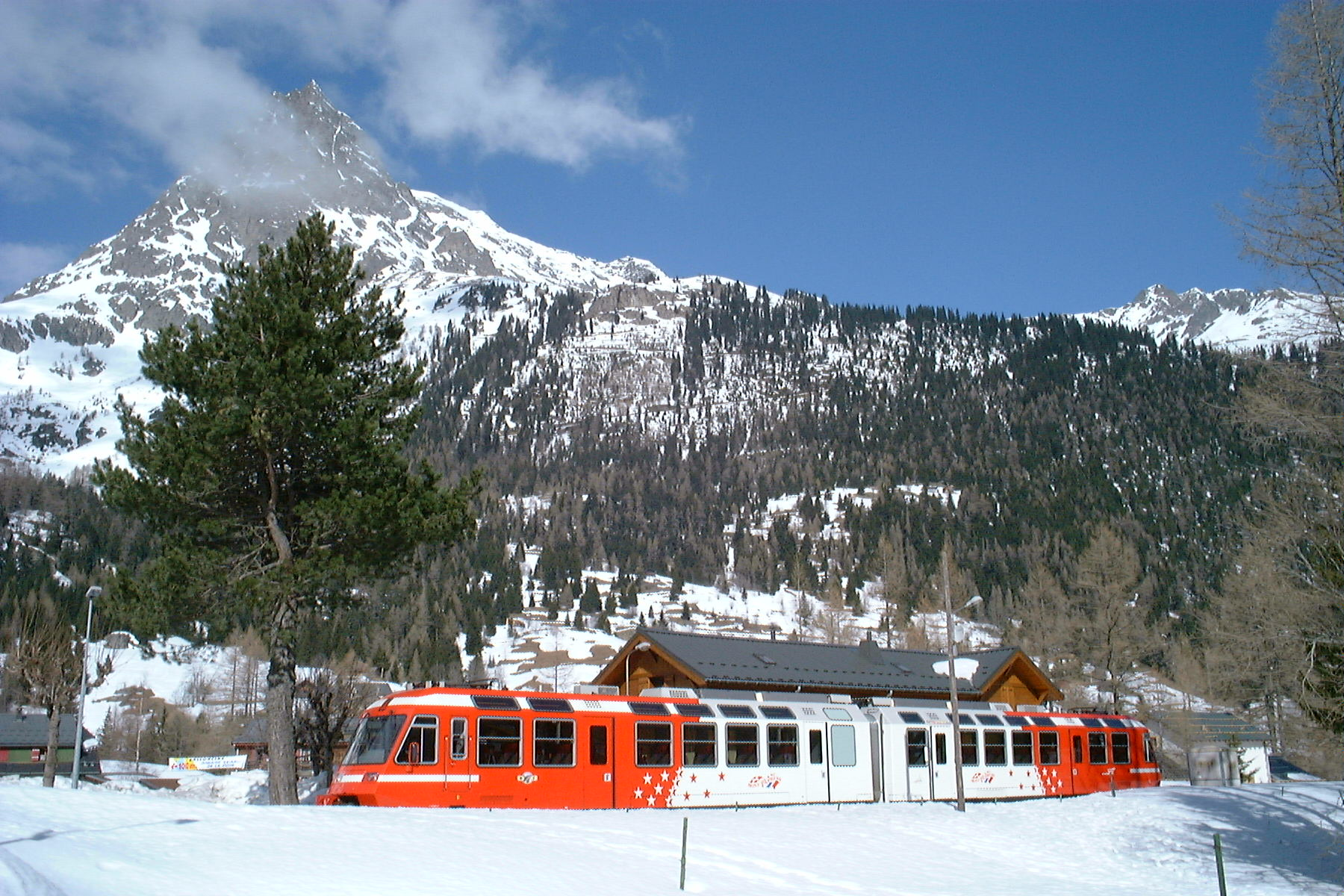
- A train at the station in 2000

General information
- Location: Vallorcine; France
- Coordinates: 46°01′08″N 6°55′13″E
- Elevation: 1,342 m (4,403 ft)
- Owner: SNCF
- Line: Saint-Gervais–Vallorcine line
- Distance: 32.3 km (20.1 mi) from Saint-Gervais-les-Bains-Le Fayet
- Train operators: TER Auvergne-Rhône-Alpes

Passengers
- 2019: 2,074 (SNCF)

Services
Preceding station	TER Auvergne-Rhône-Alpes	Following station
Montroc-le-Planet towards Saint-Gervais	44	Vallorcine Terminus
Location

Le Buet station (French: Gare du Buet) is a railway station in the commune of Vallorcine, in the French department of Haute-Savoie. It is located on the 1,000 mm (3 ft 3 3/8 in) gauge Saint-Gervais–Vallorcine line of SNCF.

== Services ==
As of the December 2020 timetable change, the following services stop at Le Buet:

- TER Auvergne-Rhône-Alpes: hourly service between Saint-Gervais-les-Bains-Le Fayet and Vallorcine.
