= Argentière station =

Railway station in Chamonix-Mont-Blanc, France

Argentière
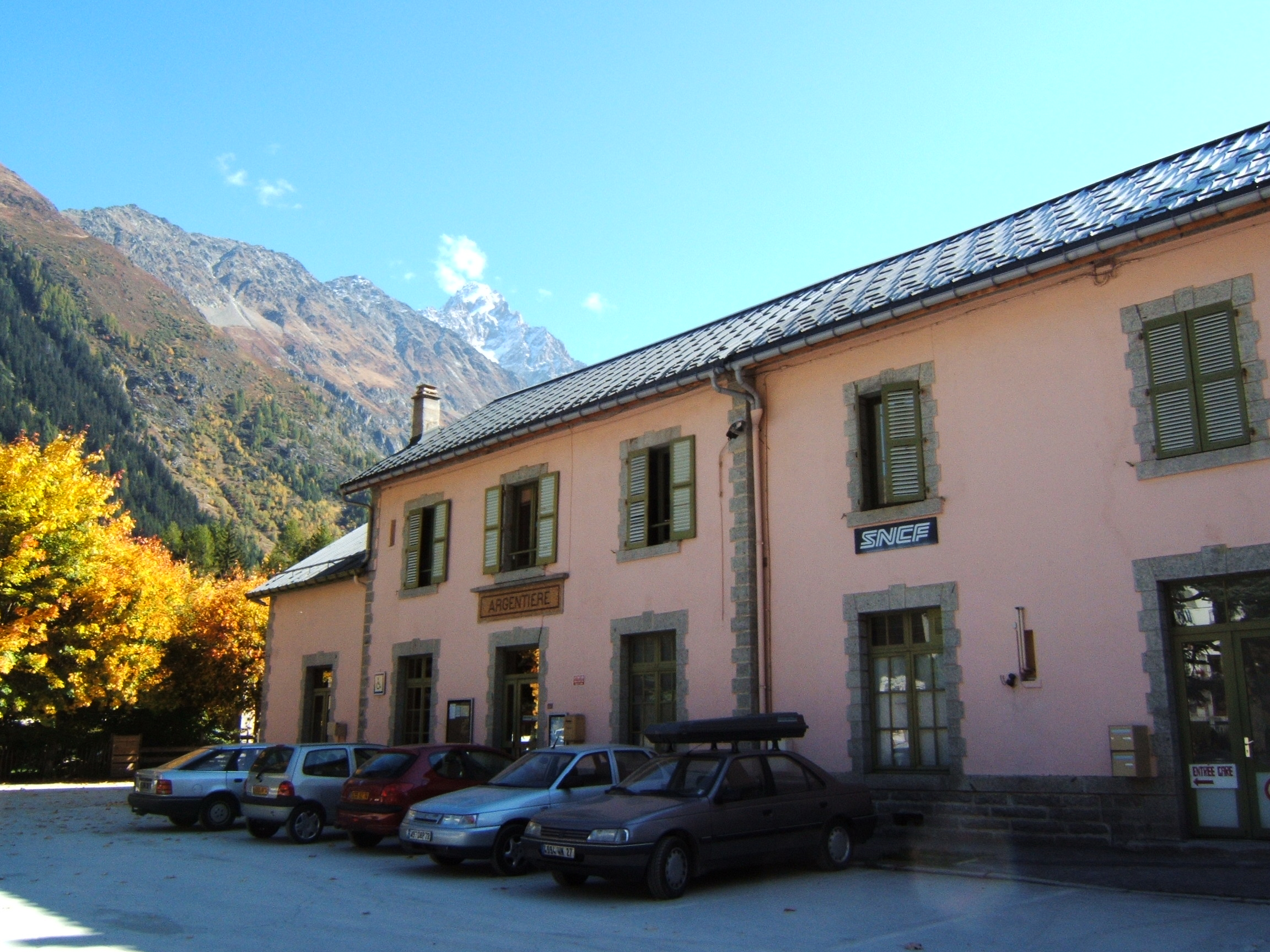
- The station building in 2005

General information
- Location: Chamonix-Mont-Blanc; France
- Coordinates: 45°58′55″N 6°55′35″E
- Elevation: 1,244 m (4,081 ft)
- Owner: SNCF
- Line: Saint-Gervais–Vallorcine line
- Distance: 27.3 km (17.0 mi) from Saint-Gervais-les-Bains-Le Fayet
- Train operators: TER Auvergne-Rhône-Alpes
- Connections: Chamonix Bus bus lines

Passengers
- 2019: 14,463 (SNCF)

Services
Preceding station	TER Auvergne-Rhône-Alpes	Following station
La Joux towards Saint-Gervais	44	Montroc-le-Planet towards Vallorcine
Location

Argentière station (French: Gare d'Argentière) is a railway station in the commune of Chamonix-Mont-Blanc, in the French department of Haute-Savoie. It is located on the 1,000 mm (3 ft 3 3/8 in) gauge Saint-Gervais–Vallorcine line of SNCF.

== Services ==
As of the December 2020 timetable change, the following services stop at Argentière:

- TER Auvergne-Rhône-Alpes: hourly service between Saint-Gervais-les-Bains-Le Fayet and Vallorcine.
