= Montroc-le-Planet station =

Railway station in Chamonix-Mont-Blanc, France

Montroc-le-Planet
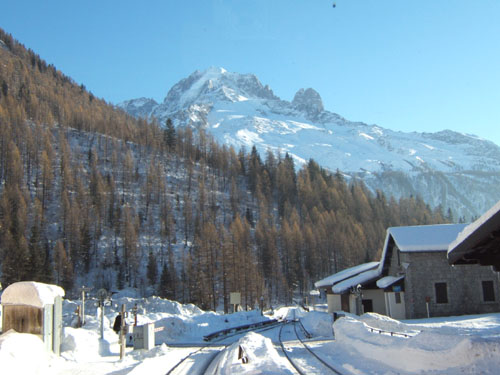
- The station during the winter

General information
- Location: Chamonix-Mont-Blanc; France
- Coordinates: 45°59′47″N 6°56′04″E
- Elevation: 1,365 m (4,478 ft)
- Owner: SNCF
- Line: Saint-Gervais–Vallorcine line
- Distance: 29.5 km (18.3 mi) from Saint-Gervais-les-Bains-Le Fayet
- Train operators: TER Auvergne-Rhône-Alpes
- Connections: Chamonix Bus bus lines

Passengers
- 2019: 4,393 (SNCF)

Services
| Preceding station | TER Auvergne-Rhône-Alpes | Following station |
|---|---|---|
| Argentière towards Saint-Gervais | 44 | Le Buet towards Vallorcine |
Location

Montroc-le-Planet station (French: Gare de Montroc-le-Planet) is a railway station in the commune of Chamonix-Mont-Blanc, in the French department of Haute-Savoie. It is located on the 1,000 mm (3 ft 3 3/8 in) gauge Saint-Gervais–Vallorcine line of SNCF.

== Services ==
As of the December 2020 timetable change, the following services stop at Montroc-le-Planet:

- TER Auvergne-Rhône-Alpes: hourly service between Saint-Gervais-les-Bains-Le Fayet and Vallorcine.
