= Les Moussoux station =

Railway station in Chamonix-Mont-Blanc, France

Les Moussoux
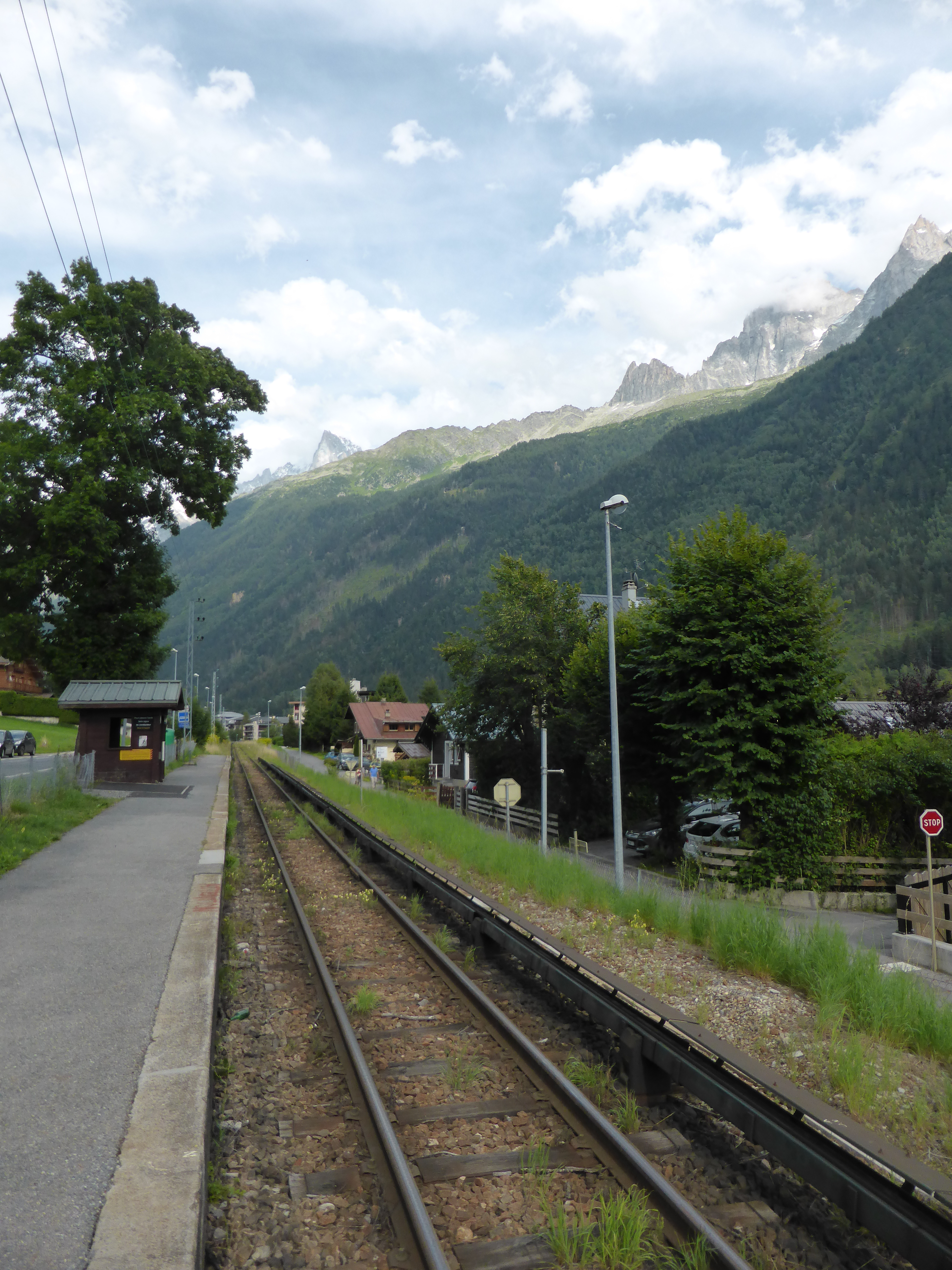
- The station platform in 2014

General information
- Location: Chamonix-Mont-Blanc; France
- Coordinates: 45°55′00″N 6°51′32″E
- Owner: SNCF
- Line: Saint-Gervais–Vallorcine line
- Distance: 17.5 km (10.9 mi) from Saint-Gervais-les-Bains-Le Fayet
- Train operators: TER Auvergne-Rhône-Alpes
- Connections: Chamonix Bus bus lines

Passengers
- 2019: 3,100 (SNCF)

Services
Preceding station	TER Auvergne-Rhône-Alpes	Following station
Les Pélerins towards Saint-Gervais	44	Chamonix-Aiguille-du-Midi towards Vallorcine
Location

Les Moussoux station (French: Gare des Moussoux) is a railway station in the commune of Chamonix-Mont-Blanc, in the French department of Haute-Savoie. It is located on the 1,000 mm (3 ft 3 3/8 in) gauge Saint-Gervais–Vallorcine line of SNCF.

== Services ==
As of the December 2020 timetable change, the following services stop at Les Moussoux:

- TER Auvergne-Rhône-Alpes: hourly service between Saint-Gervais-les-Bains-Le Fayet and Vallorcine.
