= Les Pélerins station =

Railway station in Chamonix-Mont-Blanc, France

Les Pélerins
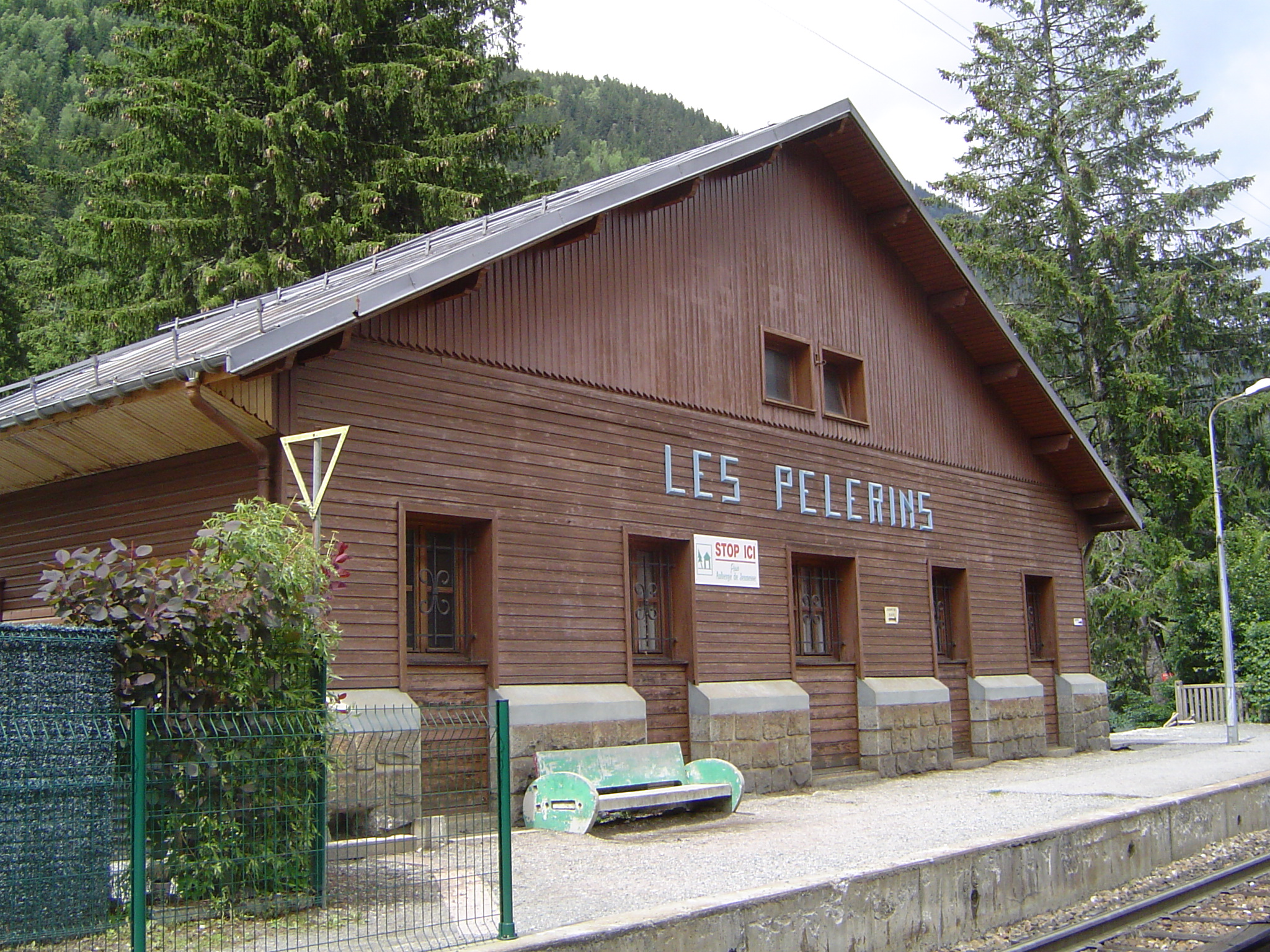
- The station building in 2011

General information
- Location: Chamonix-Mont-Blanc; France
- Coordinates: 45°54′45″N 6°50′50″E
- Owner: SNCF
- Line: Saint-Gervais–Vallorcine line
- Distance: 16.6 km (10.3 mi) from Saint-Gervais-les-Bains–Le Fayet
- Train operators: TER Auvergne-Rhône-Alpes
- Connections: Chamonix Bus bus lines

Passengers
- 2019: 3,969 (SNCF)

Services
| Preceding station | TER Auvergne-Rhône-Alpes | Following station |
|---|---|---|
| Les Bossons towards Saint-Gervais | 44 | Les Moussoux towards Vallorcine |
Location

Les Pélerins station (French: Gare des Pélerins) is a railway station in the commune of Chamonix-Mont-Blanc, in the French department of Haute-Savoie. It is located on the 1,000 mm (3 ft 3 3/8 in) gauge Saint-Gervais–Vallorcine line of SNCF.

== Services ==
As of the December 2020 timetable change, the following services stop at Les Pélerins:

- TER Auvergne-Rhône-Alpes: hourly service between Saint-Gervais-les-Bains-Le Fayet and Vallorcine.
