= Les Praz-de-Chamonix station =

Railway station in Chamonix-Mont-Blanc, France

Les Praz-de-Chamonix
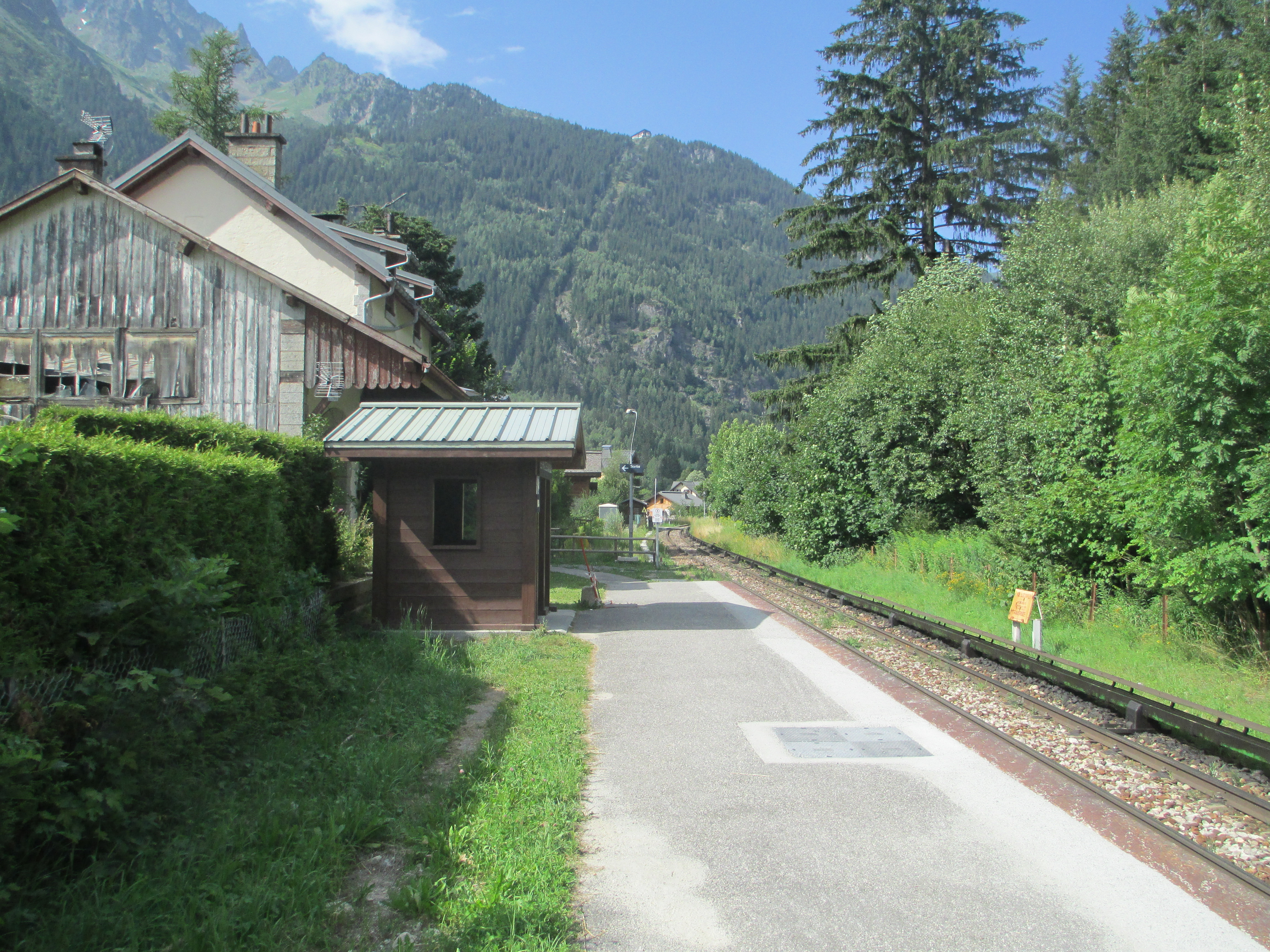
- The station platform in 2013

General information
- Location: Chamonix-Mont-Blanc; France
- Coordinates: 45°56′22″N 6°53′20″E
- Elevation: 1,064 m (3,491 ft)
- Owner: SNCF
- Line: Saint-Gervais–Vallorcine line
- Distance: 21.5 km (13.4 mi) from Saint-Gervais-les-Bains–Le Fayet
- Train operators: TER Auvergne-Rhône-Alpes
- Connections: Chamonix Bus bus lines

Passengers
- 2019: 5,418 (SNCF)

Services
Preceding station	TER Auvergne-Rhône-Alpes	Following station
Chamonix-Mont-Blanc towards Saint-Gervais	44	Les Tines towards Vallorcine
Location

Les Praz-de-Chamonix station (French: Gare des Praz-de-Chamonix) is a railway station in the commune of Chamonix-Mont-Blanc, in the French department of Haute-Savoie. It is located on the 1,000 mm (3 ft 3 3/8 in) gauge Saint-Gervais–Vallorcine line of SNCF.

== Services ==
As of the December 2020 timetable change, the following services stop at Les Praz-de-Chamonix:

- TER Auvergne-Rhône-Alpes: hourly service between Saint-Gervais-les-Bains-Le Fayet and Vallorcine.
