= Les Tines station =

Railway station in Chamonix-Mont-Blanc, France

Les Tines
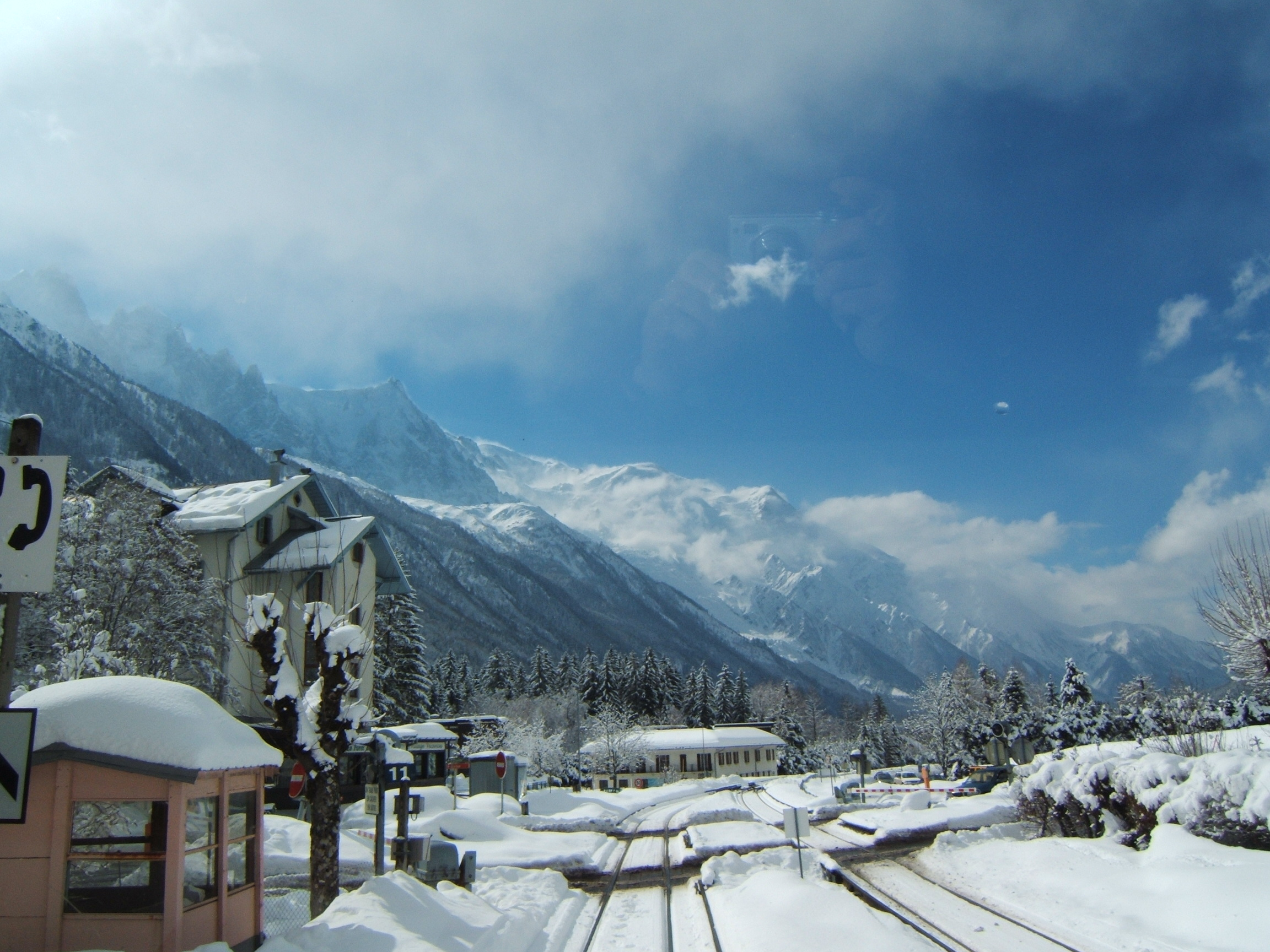
- The station in 2006

General information
- Location: Chamonix-Mont-Blanc; France
- Coordinates: 45°57′02″N 6°53′57″E
- Elevation: 1,082 m (3,550 ft)
- Owner: SNCF
- Line: Saint-Gervais–Vallorcine line
- Distance: 23.0 km (14.3 mi) from Saint-Gervais-les-Bains-Le Fayet
- Train operators: TER Auvergne-Rhône-Alpes
- Connections: Chamonix Bus bus lines

Passengers
- 2019: 2,759 (SNCF)

Services
Preceding station	TER Auvergne-Rhône-Alpes	Following station
Les Praz-de-Chamonix towards Saint-Gervais	44	La Joux towards Vallorcine
Location

Les Tines station (French: Gare des Tines) is a railway station in the commune of Chamonix-Mont-Blanc, in the French department of Haute-Savoie. It is located on the 1,000 mm (3 ft 3 3/8 in) gauge Saint-Gervais–Vallorcine line of SNCF.

== Services ==
As of the December 2020 timetable change, the following services stop at Les Tines:

- TER Auvergne-Rhône-Alpes: hourly service between Saint-Gervais-les-Bains-Le Fayet and Vallorcine.
