= La Joux station =

Railway station in Haute-Savoie, France

La Joux
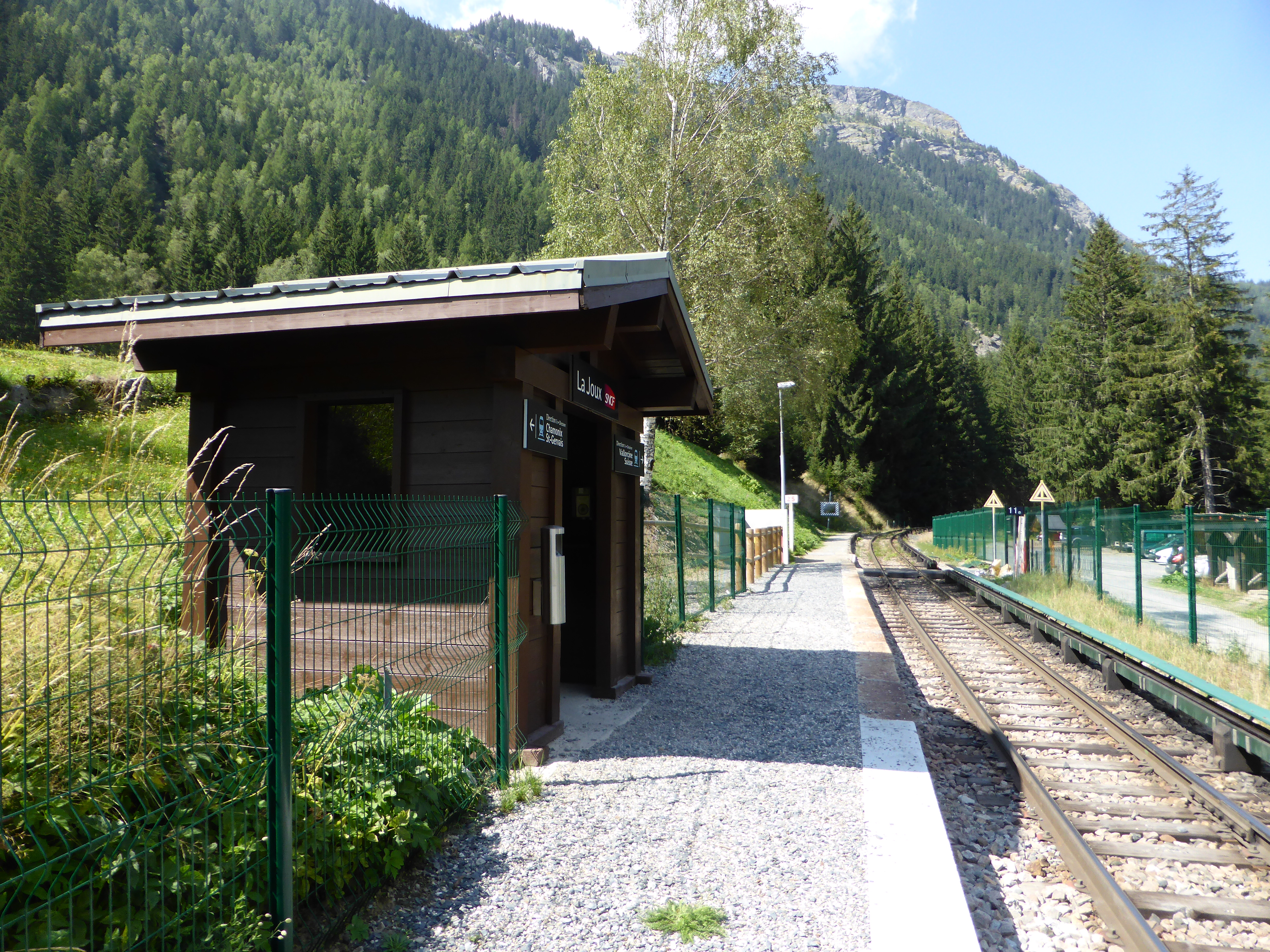
- The station in 2015

General information
- Location: Chamonix-Mont-Blanc; France
- Coordinates: 45°57′57″N 6°54′37″E
- Owner: SNCF
- Line: Saint-Gervais–Vallorcine line
- Distance: 25.0 km (15.5 mi) from Saint-Gervais-les-Bains-Le Fayet
- Train operators: TER Auvergne-Rhône-Alpes

Passengers
- 2019: 330 (SNCF)

Services
Preceding station	TER Auvergne-Rhône-Alpes	Following station
Les Tines towards Saint-Gervais	44	Argentière towards Vallorcine
Location

La Joux station (French: Gare de La Joux) is a railway station in the commune of Chamonix-Mont-Blanc, in the French department of Haute-Savoie. It is located on the 1,000 mm (3 ft 3 3/8 in) gauge Saint-Gervais–Vallorcine line of SNCF.

== Services ==
As of the December 2020 timetable change, the following services stop at La Joux:

- TER Auvergne-Rhône-Alpes: hourly service between Saint-Gervais-les-Bains-Le Fayet and Vallorcine.
