= SNCF Class Z 800 =

Class of 5 French electric multiple unit trains

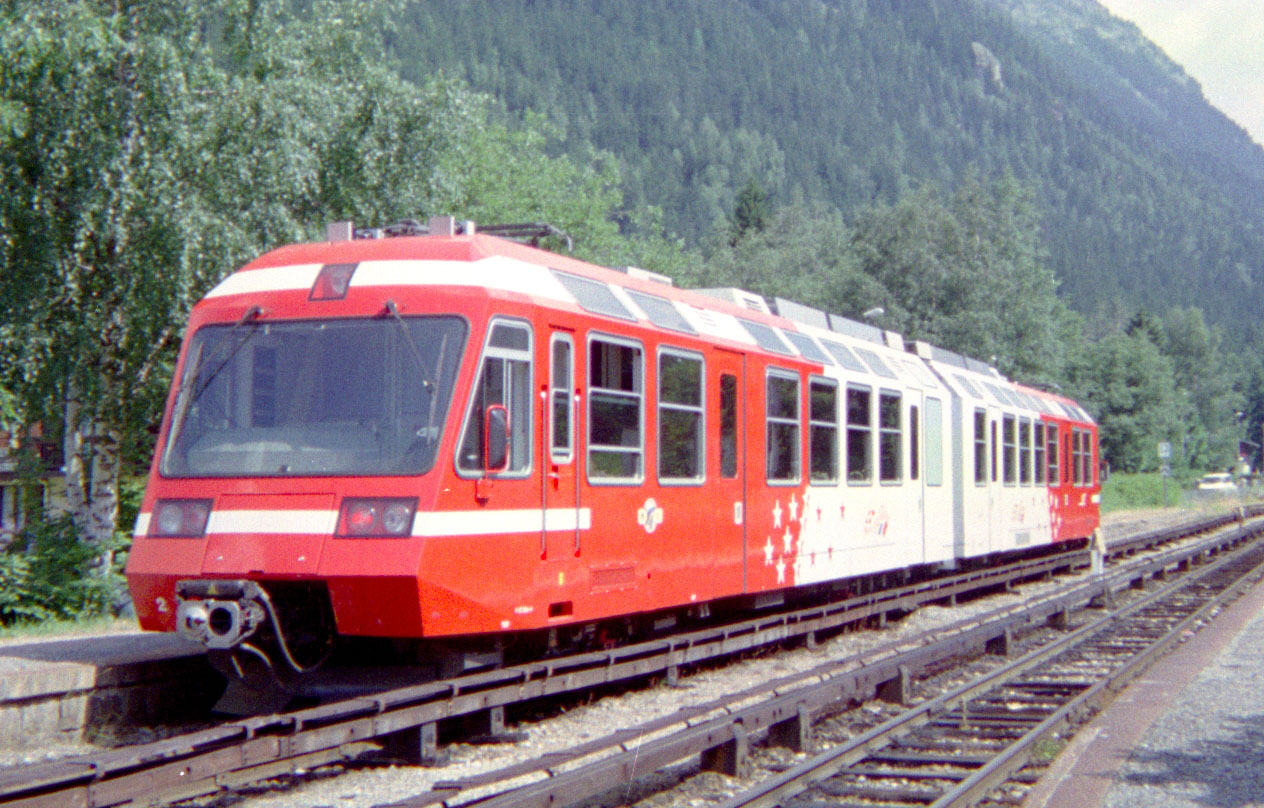
- An SNCF Class Z 800 trainset at Tines station in 1999
- In service: 1996–present
- Constructed: 1996-1997
- Number built: 5
- Predecessor: Z 600
- Successor: Z 850
- Capacity: 96 seated, 10 standing
- Operator: TER Auvergne-Rhône-Alpes
- Line served: Saint-Gervais–Vallorcine railway

Specifications
- Width: 2.65 m (8 ft 8 11/32 in)
- Height: 4 m (13 ft 1 15/32 in)
- Doors: 3 pairs per side
- Wheel diameter: 864 mm (34.02 in)
- Wheelbase: 11.45 m (37 ft 6 25/32 in)
- Maximum speed: 70 km/h (43 mph)
- Power output: 1,000 kW (1,300 hp)
- Electric systems: Third rail, 850 V DC (SNCF); Overhead line, 850 V DC (MCR)
- Current collection: Contact shoe (SNCF); Pantograph (MCR)
- Wheels driven: 4
- Bogies: Bo'zz 2' + 2' Bo'zz
- Track gauge: 1,000 mm (3 ft 3 3/8 in) metre gauge

The SNCF Z 800 is an electric multiple unit train used on the Saint-Gervais–Vallorcine railway. They were purchased in a joint order by SNCF and the Martigny–Châtelard Railway (MCR) on March 30, 1994. Five trainsets were produced: three for SNCF (one of which was financed by the Rhône-Alpes region), and two for the MCR.

== Development ==
As the Z 600 trainsets were wearing out, replacement for them was envisioned at the end of the 1980s. A joint order was created with SNCF and the MCR to replace the existing Z 600 transits. Five transits were ordered in 1994 from a consortium made up of Vevey Technologies (project coordination, assembly and construction of the boxes), Adtranz (electrical equipment) and SLM Winterthur (bogies, braking and rack and pinion equipment).

== Description ==
For the trains be able to operate from Fayet to Martigny, they are equipped with security systems corresponding to the two lines. They can operate on the rack sections of the TMRs. Current collection is done by 3rd rail shoe or pantograph.

The Z 800 multiple units are permanently coupled in pairs. There are power and communications connections the two multiple units of a train. The three SNCF trains are numbered Z 801/802 (train 1), Z 803/804 (train 2) and Z 805/806 (train 3), while those of the MC are Z 821 / 822 (train No. 21) and Z 823/824 (train No. 22). However, these are numbered BDeh 4/8 n ° 821/822 and 823/824 in the nomenclature of TMR. The odd numbered railcar is directed towards Fayet, and the even number railcar is directed towards Martigny. The new trainsets were delivered in 1996-1997, with three for SNCF and two for the MCR.

Each unit is equipped with two bogies with two axles including a carrier and a motor. The motors have a power output of 1000 kW. A train can reach 70 km/h on an easy profile, 45 km/h (28 mph) on 70 mm/m (7 %) ramps, 35 km/h (22 mph) on upper ramps, and 16 km/h (9.9 mph) downhill.

The Z 800s are equipped with five braking systems:

- A compressed air brake applied to the wheels
- A rheostatic and regenerative brake, intended to regulate the descent speed when going downhill
- An emergency magnetic brake acting on the rails
- A clasp brake
- A disc brake

The trainsets are fitted with a Scharfenberg coupler, which allows multiple trains to couple connect together during periods of heavy usage. It is also possible to couple them with Z 600 trainsets, which was notably done during test campaigns in 1997.
