= Chamonix-Mont-Blanc station =

Railway station in Chamonix-Mont-Blanc, France

Chamonix-Mont-Blanc
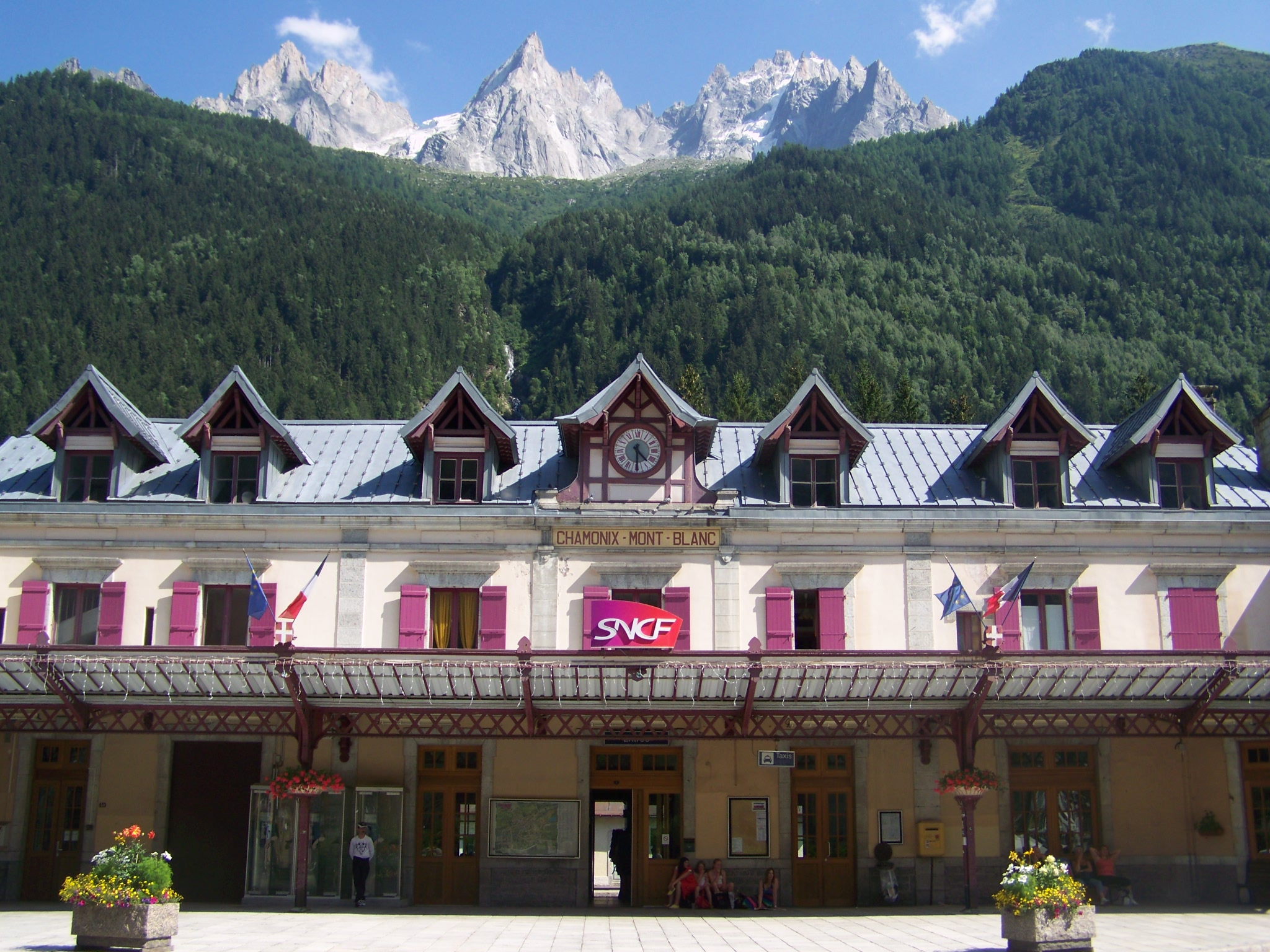
- The station building in 2009

General information
- Location: Chamonix-Mont-Blanc; France
- Coordinates: 45°55′22″N 6°52′25″E
- Elevation: 1,037 m (3,402 ft)
- Owner: SNCF
- Line: Saint-Gervais–Vallorcine line
- Distance: 19.0 km (11.8 mi) from Saint-Gervais-les-Bains-Le Fayet
- Train operators: TER Auvergne-Rhône-Alpes

Passengers
- 2019: 150,679 (SNCF)

Services
Preceding station	TER Auvergne-Rhône-Alpes	Following station
Chamonix-Aiguille-du-Midi towards Saint-Gervais	44	Les Praz-de-Chamonix towards Vallorcine
Location

Chamonix-Mont-Blanc station (French: Gare de Chamonix-Mont-Blanc) is a railway station in the commune of Chamonix-Mont-Blanc, in the French department of Haute-Savoie. It is located on the 1,000 mm (3 ft 3 3/8 in) gauge Saint-Gervais–Vallorcine line of SNCF. The station is adjacent to the station of the Chemin de fer du Montenvers, which operates a rack railway to the Mer de Glace.

== Services ==
As of the December 2020 timetable change, the following services stop at Chamonix-Mont-Blanc:

- TER Auvergne-Rhône-Alpes: hourly service between Saint-Gervais-les-Bains-Le Fayet and Vallorcine.
