= Chamonix =

Chamonix Chamôni (Arpitan)
- Commune
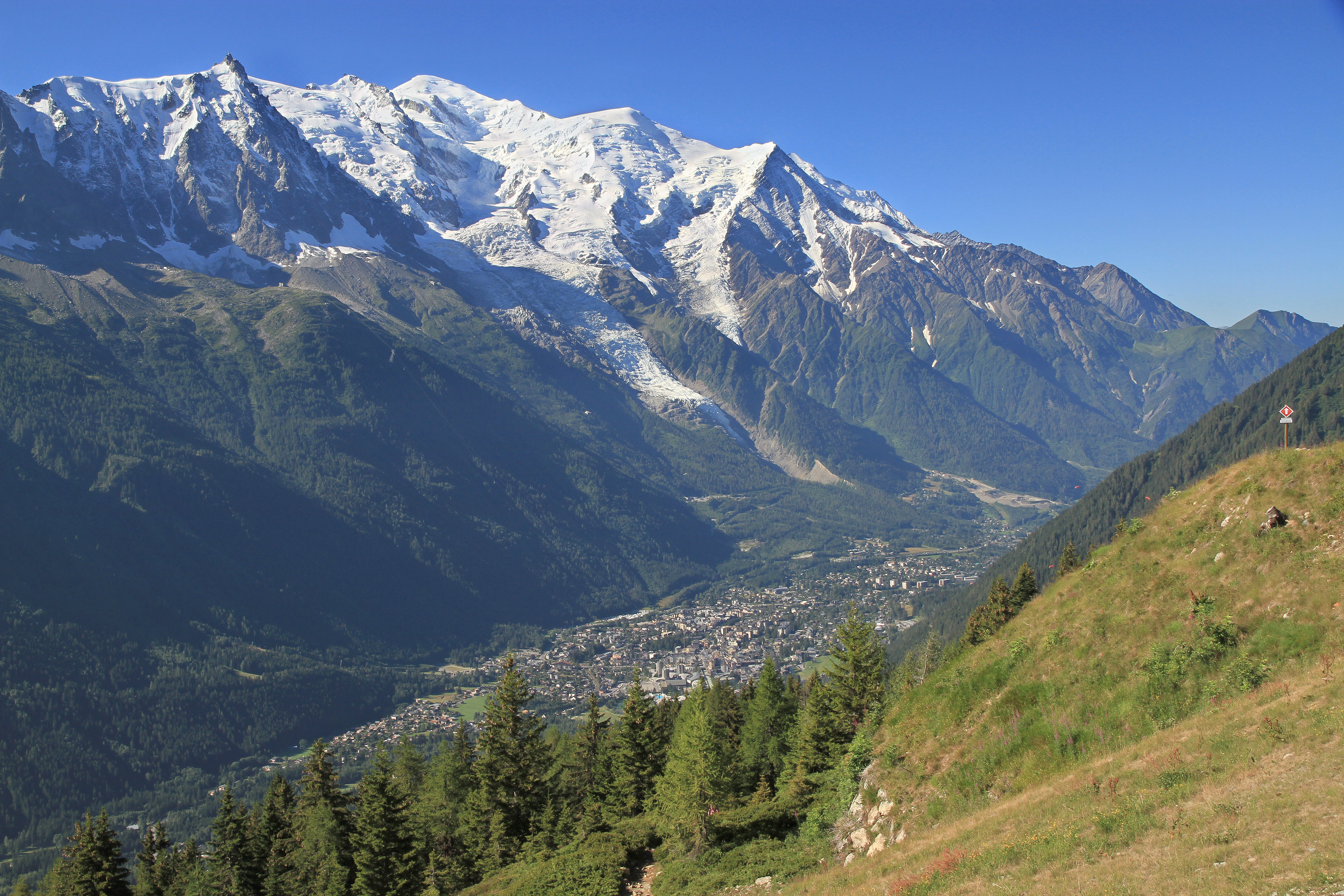
- The Chamonix Valley seen in 2010 from La Flégère with Mont Blanc in the background

- Coat of arms
- Location of Chamonix
- Location within France Location within Auvergne-Rhône-Alpes
- Coordinates: 45°55′23″N 6°52′11″E
- Country: France
- Region: Auvergne-Rhône-Alpes
- Department: Haute-Savoie
- Arrondissement: Bonneville
- Canton: Le Mont-Blanc
- Intercommunality: CC de la Vallée de Chamonix-Mont-Blanc

Government
  - Mayor (2020–2026): Éric Fournier
- Area^{1}: 116.6 km^{2} (45.0 sq mi)
- Elevation: 1,035 m (3,396 ft)
- Highest elevation: 4,807 m (15,771 ft)
- Lowest elevation: 995 m (3,264 ft)
- Population (2023): 8,705
  - Density: 74.66/km^{2} (193.4/sq mi)
  - Urban: 12,202
- Demonym: Chamoniards
- Time zone: UTC+01:00 (CET)
  - Summer (DST): UTC+02:00 (CEST)
- INSEE/Postal code: 74056 /74400
- Website: www.chamonix.fr
- ^{1} French Land Register data, which excludes lakes, ponds, glaciers > 1 km^{2} (0.386 sq mi or 247 acres) and river estuaries.

Chamonix-Mont-Blanc (French pronunciation: [ʃamɔni mɔ̃ blɑ̃]; Arpitan: Chamôni-Mont-Blanc), more commonly known simply as Chamonix (Chamôni), (Note: English pronunciation: UK: /ˈʃæməni, -mɒni/ SHAM-ə-nee, -on-ee, US: /ˌʃɑːmoʊˈniː/ SHAH-moh-NEE.) (Note: Formerly spelled Chamounix.) is a commune in the Haute-Savoie department in the Auvergne-Rhône-Alpes region in southeastern France. It hosted the first Winter Olympics, held in 1924.

Chamonix is situated in the French Alps just north of Mont Blanc, the highest mountain in Western Europe. Between the peaks of the Aiguilles Rouges and the notable Aiguille du Midi, it borders both Switzerland and Italy. It is one of the oldest ski resorts in France, popular with alpinists and mountain enthusiasts. Via the cable car lift to the Aiguille du Midi it is possible to access the off-piste ski run of the Vallée Blanche ('white valley').

== Name ==
The name Campum munitum, meaning fortified plain or field, had been used as early as 1091. By 1283 the name had been abbreviated to a similar form to the modern Chamonis. Other forms through the ages include Chamouny in 1581, Chamony in 1652, Chamouni in 1786, and the particular spelling Chamonix from 1793.

As with many polysyllabic Arpitan anthroponyms, the final -x marks oxytonic stress (on the last syllable), whereas the final -z indicates paroxytonic stress (on the penultimate syllable) and should not be pronounced, although in French it is often mispronounced due to hypercorrection.

== Status ==
Chamonix is the fourth-largest commune in metropolitan France, with an area of 245 km^{2} (95 sq mi). Its population of around 8,900 ranks 1,089th within the country of France.

== History ==
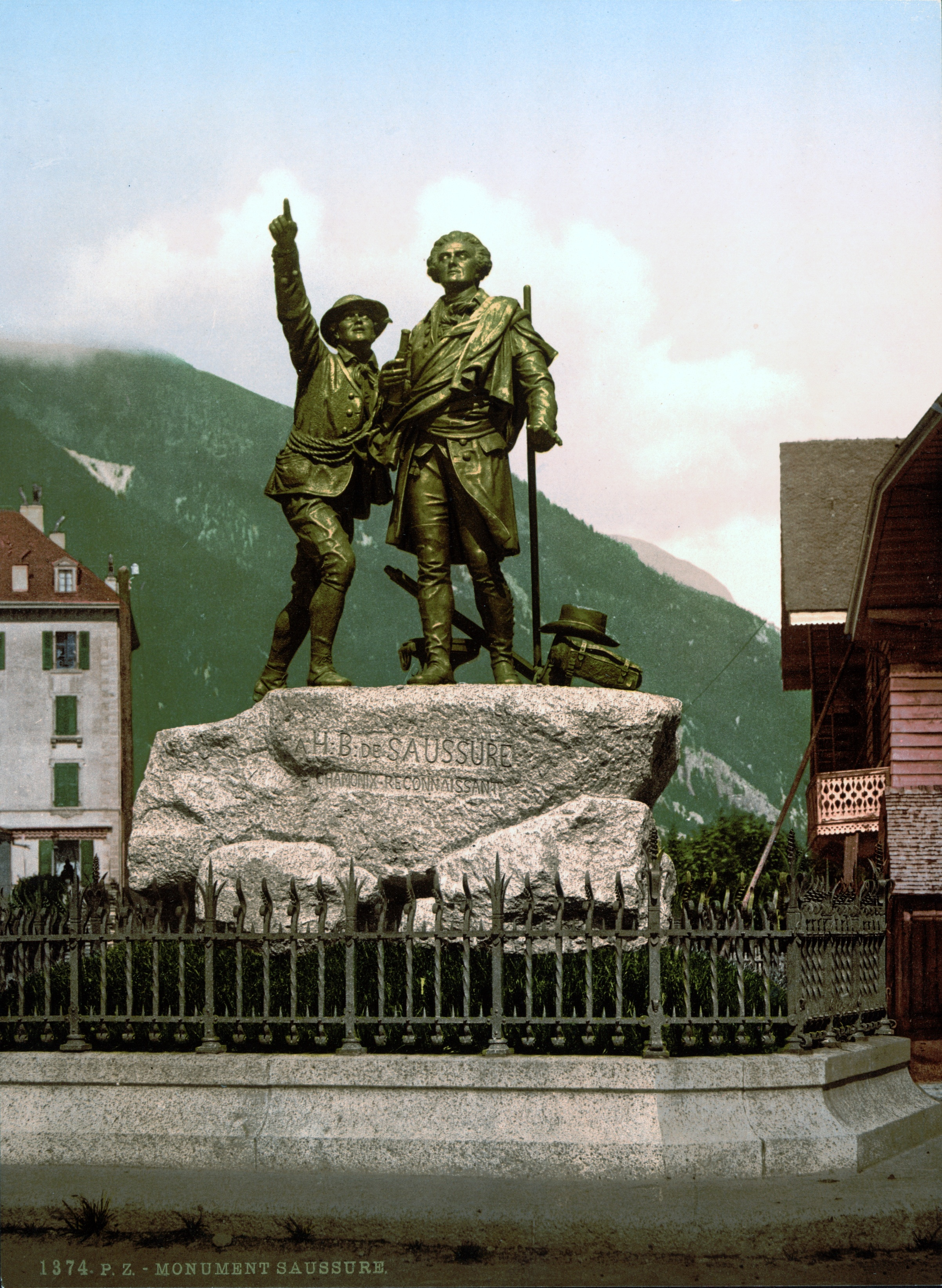
Horace Bénédict de Saussure, with Jacques Balmat (left) who points towards the summit of Mont Blanc, Monument at Chamonix.

The valley was first mentioned in 1091, when it was granted by the Count of the Genevois to the great Benedictine house of St. Michel de la Cluse, near Turin, which by the early 13th century had established a priory there. However, in 1786 the inhabitants bought their freedom from the canons of Sallanches, to whom the priory had been transferred in 1519.

In 1530, the inhabitants obtained from the Count of the Genevois the privilege of holding two fairs a year, while the valley was often visited by the civil officials and by the bishops of Geneva (first recorded visit in 1411, while St. Francis de Sales came there in 1606). But travellers for pleasure were very rare.

Chamonix was part of the historical land of Savoy and emerged as the feudal territory of the House of Savoy during the 11th to 14th centuries. The historical territory is shared between the modern countries of France, Italy and Switzerland. The House of Savoy became the longest surviving royal house in Europe. It ruled the County of Savoy to 1416 and then the Duchy of Savoy from 1416 to 1860.

The first party to publish (1744) an account of their visit was that of Richard Pococke, William Windham and others, such as the Englishmen who visited the Mer de Glace in 1741. In 1742 came P. Martel and several other Genevese, in 1760 Horace Bénédict de Saussure, as well as rather later Marc-Théodore Bourrit.

The growth of tourism in the early 19th century led to the formation of the Compagnie des Guides de Chamonix in 1821, to regulate access to the mountain slopes (which were communally or co-operatively owned), and this association held a monopoly of guiding from the town until it was broken by French government action in 1892; thereafter guides were required to hold a diploma issued by a commission dominated by civil servants and members of the French Alpine Club rather than local residents.

From the late 19th century on, tourist development was dominated by national and international initiatives rather than local entrepreneurs, though the local community was increasingly dependent upon and active in the tourist industry.

The commune successfully lobbied to change its name from Chamonix to Chamonix-Mont-Blanc in 1916. However, following the loss of its monopoly, the Compagnie reformed as an association of local guides, and retained an important role in local society; it provided the services of a friendly society to its members, and in the 20th century many of them were noted mountaineers and popularisers of mountain tourism, notably the novelist Roger Frison-Roche, the first member of the Compagnie not to be born in Chamonix.

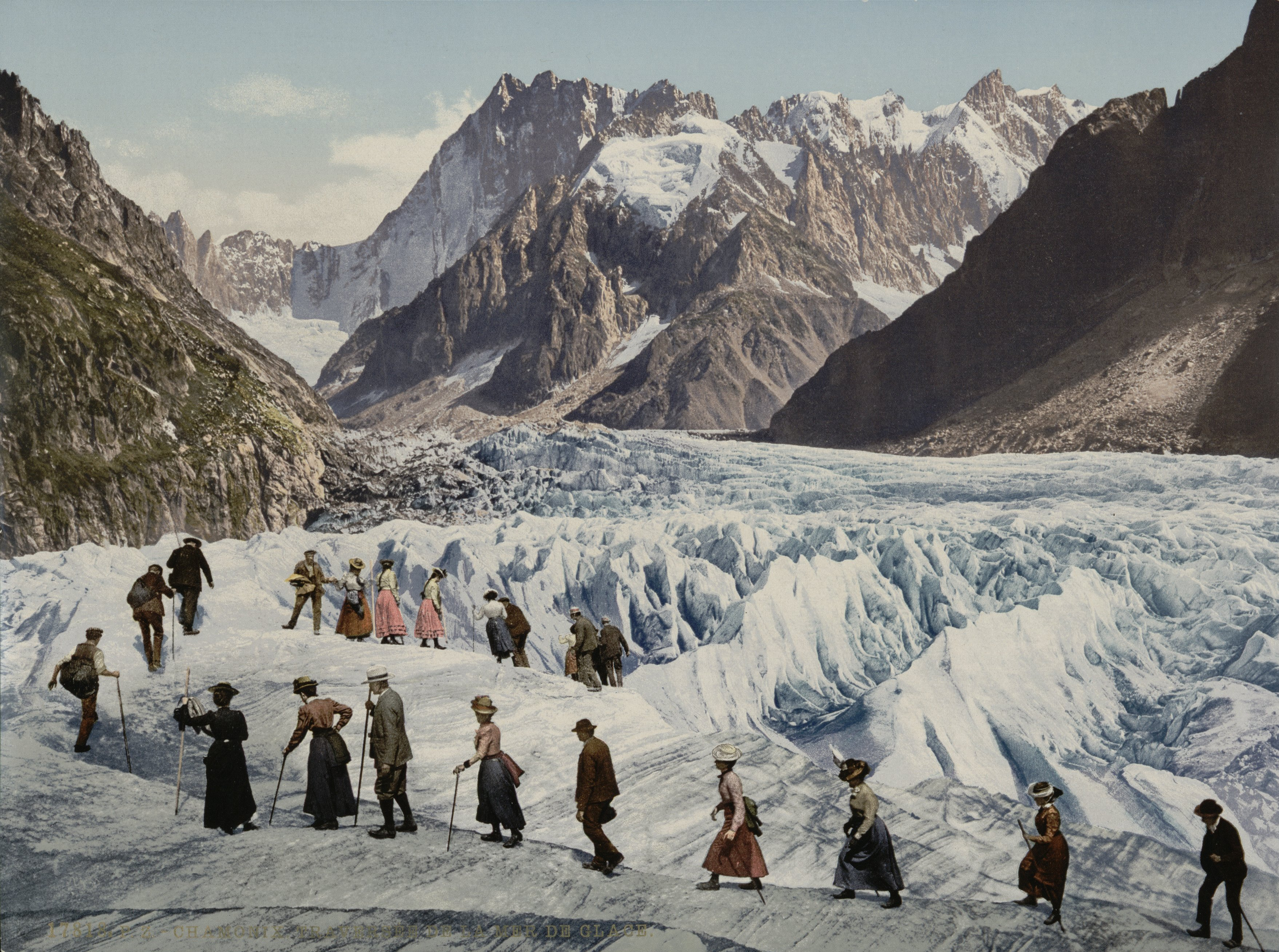
Chamonix Valley: crossing the glacier on foot (between 1902 and 1904)

Serving as the host city for the first Winter Olympic Games in 1924 further raised Chamonix's profile as an international tourist destination.

During the Second World War, a Children's Home operated in Chamonix, in which several dozens of Jewish children were hidden from the Nazis. Some of those who hid them were recognised as "Righteous Among the Nations".

By the 1960s, agriculture had been reduced to a marginal activity, while the number of tourist beds available rose to around 60,000 by the end of the 20th century, with about 5 million visitors a year.

== Geography ==
=== Settlements ===
The commune of Chamonix-Mont-Blanc includes 16 villages and hamlets. From north to south: Le Tour 1,462 m (4,797 ft), Montroc, Le Planet, Argentière 1,252 m (4,108 ft), Les Chosalets, Le Lavancher, Les Tines, Les Bois, Les-Praz-de-Chamonix 1,060 m (3,478 ft), Chamonix-Mont-Blanc, Les Pècles, Les Mouilles, Les Barrats, Les Pélerins, Les Gaillands, and Les Bossons 1,012 m (3,320 ft).

=== Climate ===
Due to its elevation, Chamonix has a humid continental climate (Dfb, according to the Köppen climate classification), with an average annual precipitation of 1,280 mm (50 in). Summers are mild and winters are cold and snowy.

Climate data for Chamonix, elevation: 1,042 m (3,419 ft), 1981–2010 normals, extremes 1880–present
Month	Jan	Feb	Mar	Apr	May	Jun	Jul	Aug	Sep	Oct	Nov	Dec	Year
Record high °C (°F)	15.3 (59.5)	19.6 (67.3)	22.1 (71.8)	26.4 (79.5)	31.7 (89.1)	36.4 (97.5)	37.2 (99.0)	36.0 (96.8)	31.1 (88.0)	26.0 (78.8)	22.3 (72.1)	16.5 (61.7)	37.2 (99.0)
Mean daily maximum °C (°F)	2.7 (36.9)	5.0 (41.0)	8.9 (48.0)	12.7 (54.9)	17.6 (63.7)	21.2 (70.2)	23.9 (75.0)	23.1 (73.6)	19.1 (66.4)	14.7 (58.5)	7.4 (45.3)	2.6 (36.7)	13.3 (55.9)
Daily mean °C (°F)	−2.2 (28.0)	−0.7 (30.7)	3.0 (37.4)	6.6 (43.9)	11.2 (52.2)	14.3 (57.7)	16.5 (61.7)	15.9 (60.6)	12.5 (54.5)	8.6 (47.5)	2.7 (36.9)	−1.6 (29.1)	7.3 (45.1)
Mean daily minimum °C (°F)	−7.1 (19.2)	−6.3 (20.7)	−3.0 (26.6)	0.4 (32.7)	4.8 (40.6)	7.5 (45.5)	9.1 (48.4)	8.7 (47.7)	6.0 (42.8)	2.5 (36.5)	−2.1 (28.2)	−5.7 (21.7)	1.3 (34.3)
Record low °C (°F)	−31.0 (−23.8)	−25.0 (−13.0)	−23.2 (−9.8)	−15.0 (5.0)	−6.0 (21.2)	−3.6 (25.5)	−1.8 (28.8)	−1.7 (28.9)	−3.5 (25.7)	−13.0 (8.6)	−22.0 (−7.6)	−25.0 (−13.0)	−31.0 (−23.8)
Average precipitation mm (inches)	93.9 (3.70)	83.8 (3.30)	86.6 (3.41)	89.0 (3.50)	121.4 (4.78)	130.4 (5.13)	119.0 (4.69)	125.9 (4.96)	103.6 (4.08)	116.8 (4.60)	100.7 (3.96)	109.8 (4.32)	1,280.9 (50.43)
Average precipitation days (≥ 1.0 mm)	9.7	8.4	9.8	10.1	13.6	12.6	11.8	12.1	9.9	10.1	9.6	10.6	128.3
Source: Meteo France

== Demographics ==
Historical population

Year	Pop.	±% p.a.
1793	1,830	—
1800	1,925	+0.73%
1806	1,949	+0.21%
1821	2,232	+0.91%
1836	2,528	+0.83%
1846	2,304	−0.92%
1856	2,308	+0.02%
1861	2,304	−0.03%
1866	2,415	+0.95%
1872	2,455	+0.27%
1876	2,406	−0.50%
1881	2,420	+0.12%
1886	2,450	+0.25%
1891	2,447	−0.02%
1896	2,435	−0.10%
1901	2,729	+2.31%
1906	3,482	+4.99%

Year	Pop.	±% p.a.
1911	3,109	−2.24%
1921	3,040	−0.22%
1926	3,811	+4.62%
1931	4,446	+3.13%
1936	4,633	+0.83%
1946	5,883	+2.42%
1954	5,699	−0.40%
1962	7,213	+2.99%
1968	7,745	+1.19%
1975	8,393	+1.15%
1982	8,746	+0.59%
1990	9,701	+1.30%
1999	9,830	+0.15%
2007	9,086	−0.98%
2012	8,882	−0.45%
2017	8,611	−0.62%
2023	8,705	+0.18%

Source: EHESS and INSEE

== Mountain and winter sports ==
Chamonix is a winter sports resort town that still attracts skiers ready to test themselves both on the pistes in the official area and against the challenges of the backcountry skiing. As the highest European mountain west of Russia, Mont Blanc attracts mountain climbers. Chamonix is known as the "Gateway to the European Cascades." The Ultra-Trail du Mont-Blanc has been held every August since 2003.

There is a cable car up to the 3,842 m (12,605 ft) Aiguille du Midi. Constructed in 1955, it was then the highest cable car in the world and remains the highest vertical ascent cable car in the world.

Chamonix is divided into three separate ski areas (Les Grands Montets, Brévent - Flégère, le domaine de Balme) which run along the valley from Le Tour down to Les Houches. In addition to the 1924 Winter Olympic Games, the town hosts a round of the FIS Alpine Ski World Cup and the Arlberg-Kandahar. It previously hosted the FIS Nordic World Ski Championships 1937 and the 1984 and 1988 Biathlon World Championships for women.

The 1930 Ice Hockey World Championships was mostly held at Chamonix. The town also hosted the European Curling Championships in 1991 and 1999.

== Transport ==
=== Roads ===
The town of Chamonix is served by French Route Nationale 205 (RN 205), nicknamed the Route blanche, or "white route", due to its snowiness. This is an extension of French autoroute 40 (A40), similarly nicknamed the autoroute blanche, which ends at Le Fayet, a village in the commune of Saint-Gervais-les-Bains. The 11.6-km Mont Blanc Tunnel, which opened in 1965, links Chamonix to Courmayeur in Italy. Chamonix is linked to Switzerland by what used to be RN 506a. In 2006, it was converted to a Route Départementale 1506, with a part of it integrated into RN 205. The nearest airport to Chamonix is Geneva Airport and it is 88 kilometres (55 miles) away.

=== Rail ===
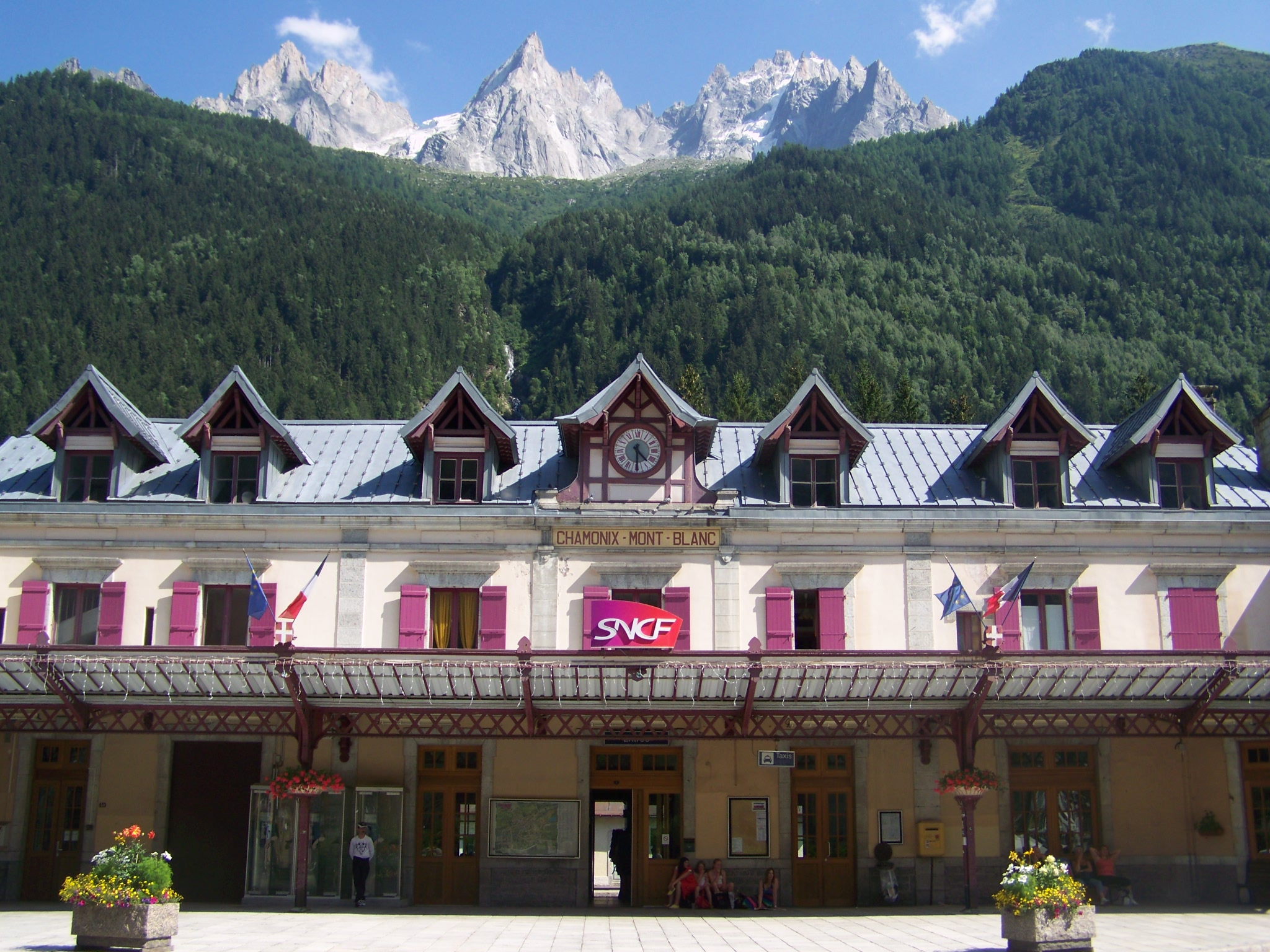
Front and façade of the Chamonix-Mont-Blanc railway station.

Chamonix is served by the metre-gauge St Gervais-Vallorcine Line, operated by SNCF. This line from Saint Gervais (on the standard-gauge rail network) to Chamonix opened in 1901; it was extended to Vallorcine in 1908. The line holds the record for the steepest gradient on any standard (adhesion) railway. 10 stations on this line are within the commune of Chamonix: Montroc-le-Planet, Argentière, La Joux, Les Tines, Les Praz-de-Chamonix, Chamonix-Mont-Blanc, Chamonix-Aiguille-du-Midi, Les Moussoux, Les Pélerins and Les Bossons.

From Vallorcine, the rail route continues over the border into Switzerland, meeting the SBB network at Martigny. This latter section, a metre-gauge cog railway, is operated by Transports de Martigny et Régions SA. The train service from Vallorcine to Martigny is known as the Mont Blanc Express. Timetables on the St Gervais-Vallorcine and Vallorcine-Martigny sections are synchronized.

The 5.1-km Montenvers Railway is a cog railway that provides access to the tourist site of Montenvers. Opened in 1909, its rail station was built next to SNCF's Chamonix station on the St Gervais-Vallorcine Line. In fact the two stations are directly linked. Montenvers provides further tourist access to middle and high mountain areas.

=== Cable cars ===
Chamonix has one of the highest cable cars in the world, which links the town to the summit of the Aiguille du Midi at 3842 m. It is based on an older system built in 1920, rebuilt in the first half of the 1950s over five summer seasons, fully modernized in 1979, and upgraded again in 2008. On the other side of the valley, another cable car links Chamonix to the viewpoint of Planpraz. A second line links Planpraz to the summit of Le Brévent at 2525 meters. Many other cable cars exist in the valley, and are heavily used by skiers and residents. The Plan Joran chairlift at the base of Les Grands Montets is due to be replaced by a 10-person gondola for the Winter 2014/15 season.

== Sister cities ==
Chamonix is twinned with:

Aosta, Italy; (United States) Aspen, Colorado; (France) Cilaos, Réunion; Courmayeur, Italy	Fujiyoshida, Japan (at the foot of Mount Fuji); Garmisch-Partenkirchen, Germany; Davos, Switzerland; Bariloche, Argentina

== Notable people ==
- Michel-Gabriel Paccard (1757–1827), a Savoyard doctor and alpinist, citizen of the Kingdom of Sardinia
- Venance Payot (1826–1902), a naturalist, glaciologist, mountain-guide, scholar, author and twice mayor of Chamonix
- Edward Whymper (1840–1911), the English mountaineer, explorer, illustrator, and author best known for the first ascent of the Matterhorn, died here in 1911
- Joseph Vallot (1854–1925), a scientist, astronomer, botanist, geographer, cartographer and alpinist
- Charles Bozon (1932–1964), an alpine ski racer and bronze medallist at the 1960 Winter Olympics

== See also ==
- Communes of the Haute-Savoie department
- Mer de Glace
- Mont Blanc Massif
- Montroc
- The Haute Route from Chamonix to Zermatt

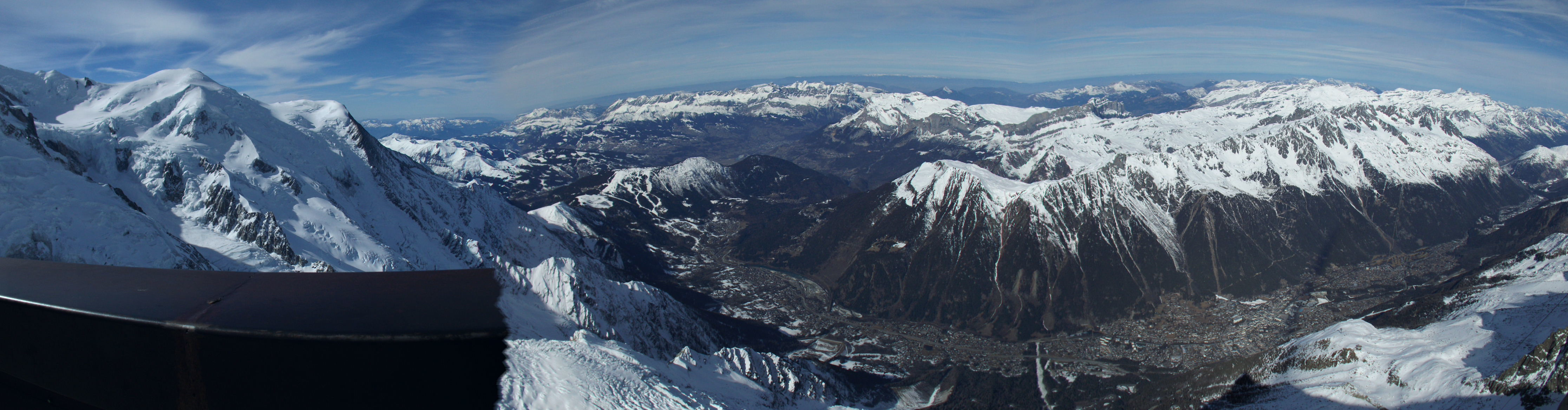
Panorama of the Chamonix Valley
