= Chamonix-Aiguille-du-Midi station =

Railway station in Chamonix-Mont-Blanc, France

Chamonix-Aiguille-du-Midi
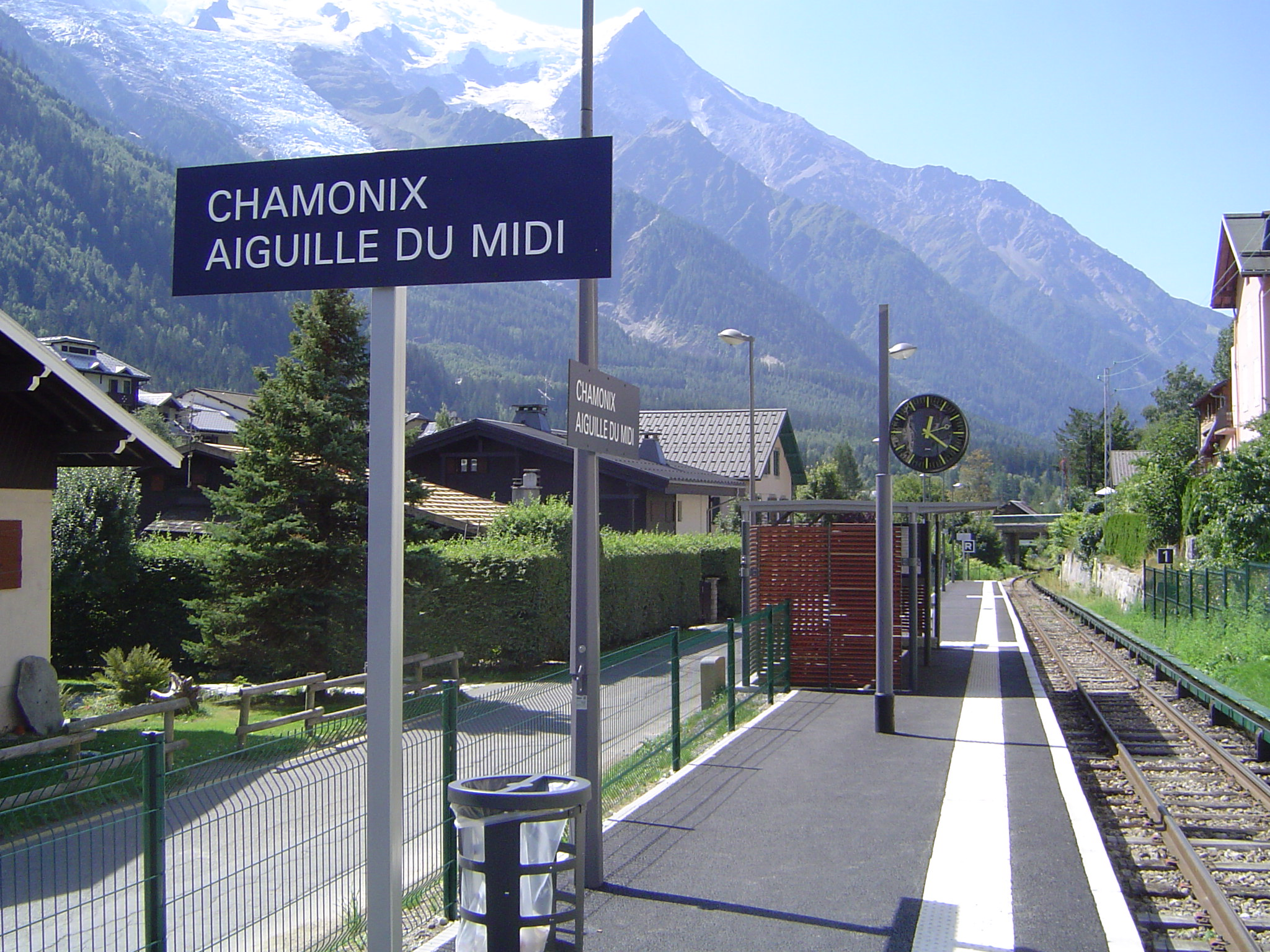
- The station platform in 2009

General information
- Location: Chamonix-Mont-Blanc; France
- Coordinates: 45°55′12″N 6°52′00″E
- Elevation: 1,034 m (3,392 ft)
- Owner: SNCF
- Line: Saint-Gervais–Vallorcine line
- Train operators: TER Auvergne-Rhône-Alpes

Passengers
- 2019: 5,373 (SNCF)

Services
Preceding station	TER Auvergne-Rhône-Alpes	Following station
Les Moussoux towards Saint-Gervais	44	Chamonix-Mont-Blanc towards Vallorcine
Location

Chamonix-Aiguille-du-Midi station (French: Gare de Chamonix-Aiguille-du-Midi) is a railway station in the commune of Chamonix-Mont-Blanc, in the French department of Haute-Savoie. It is located on the 1,000 mm (3 ft 3 3/8 in) gauge Saint-Gervais–Vallorcine line of SNCF.

== Services ==
As of the December 2020 timetable change, the following services stop at Chamonix-Aiguille-du-Midi:

- TER Auvergne-Rhône-Alpes: hourly service between Saint-Gervais-les-Bains-Le Fayet and Vallorcine.
