= Compagnie des Guides de Chamonix =

World's oldest mountain guide association

The Compagnie des Guides de Chamonix was founded in 1821 and is the oldest and largest association of mountain guides in the world. The association is based in Chamonix, France, and also has offices in Argentière and Les Houches which are only open during the high winter and summer seasons.

In the summer of 2021, the Compagnie des Guides de Chamonix celebrated its 200th anniversary.
