= Mont Blanc tramway =

Mountain railway line in the Haute-Savoie department of France

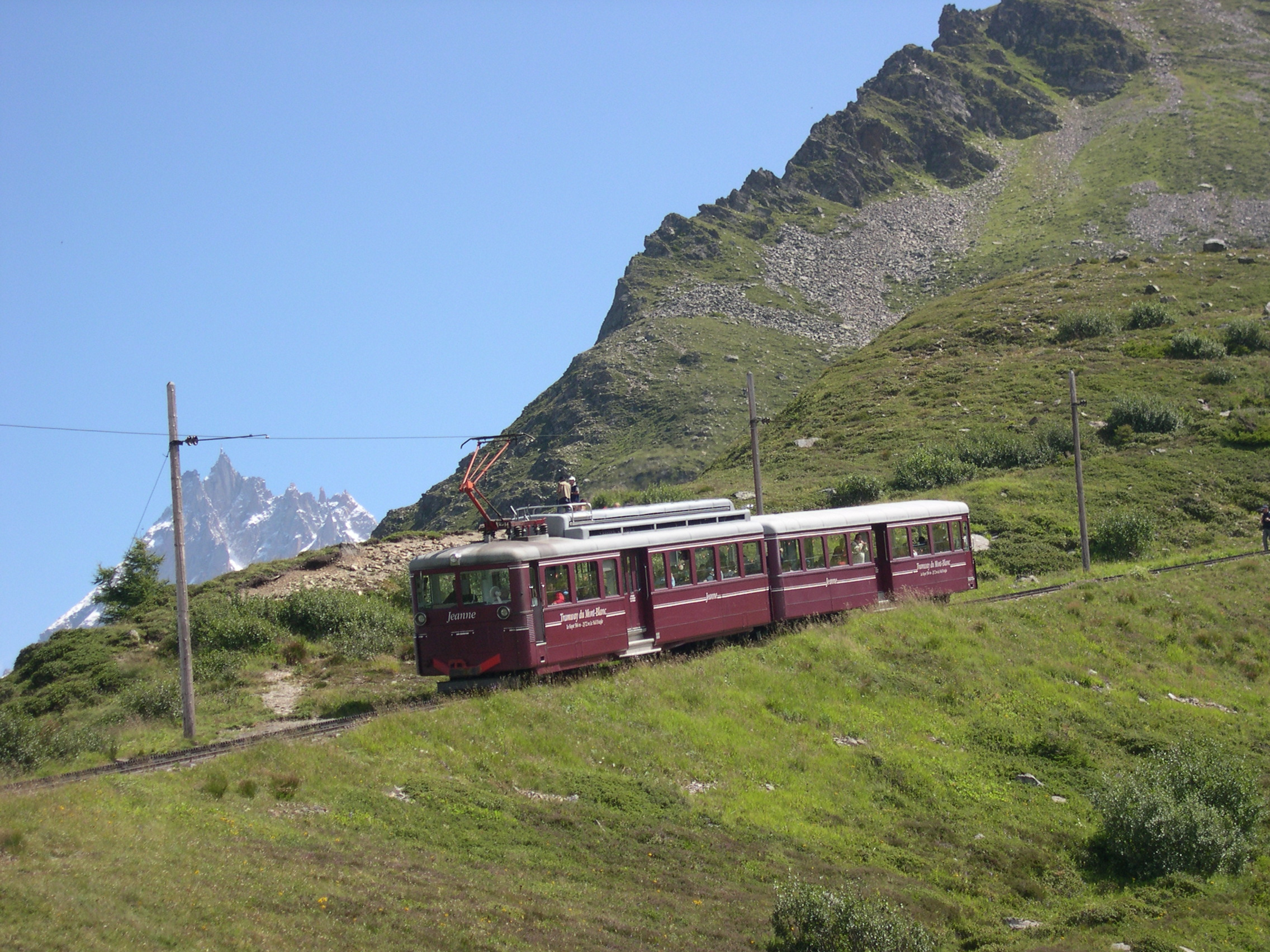
- A train of the Mont-Blanc tramway

Overview
- Termini: Gare de Saint-Gervais-les-Bains-Le Fayet; Refuge-du-Nid-d'Aigle

Service
- Type: Tramway/Rack railway
- Operator: Compagnie du Mont-Blanc

History
- Opened: 1909

Technical
- Line length: 12.79 km (7.9 mi)
- Num of tracks: 1
- Rack system: Strub
- Track gauge: 1,000 mm (3 ft 3 3/8 in)
- Electrification: 11 kV 50 Hz AC
- Highest elevation: 2,412 m (7,913 ft)
- Maximum incline: 24%

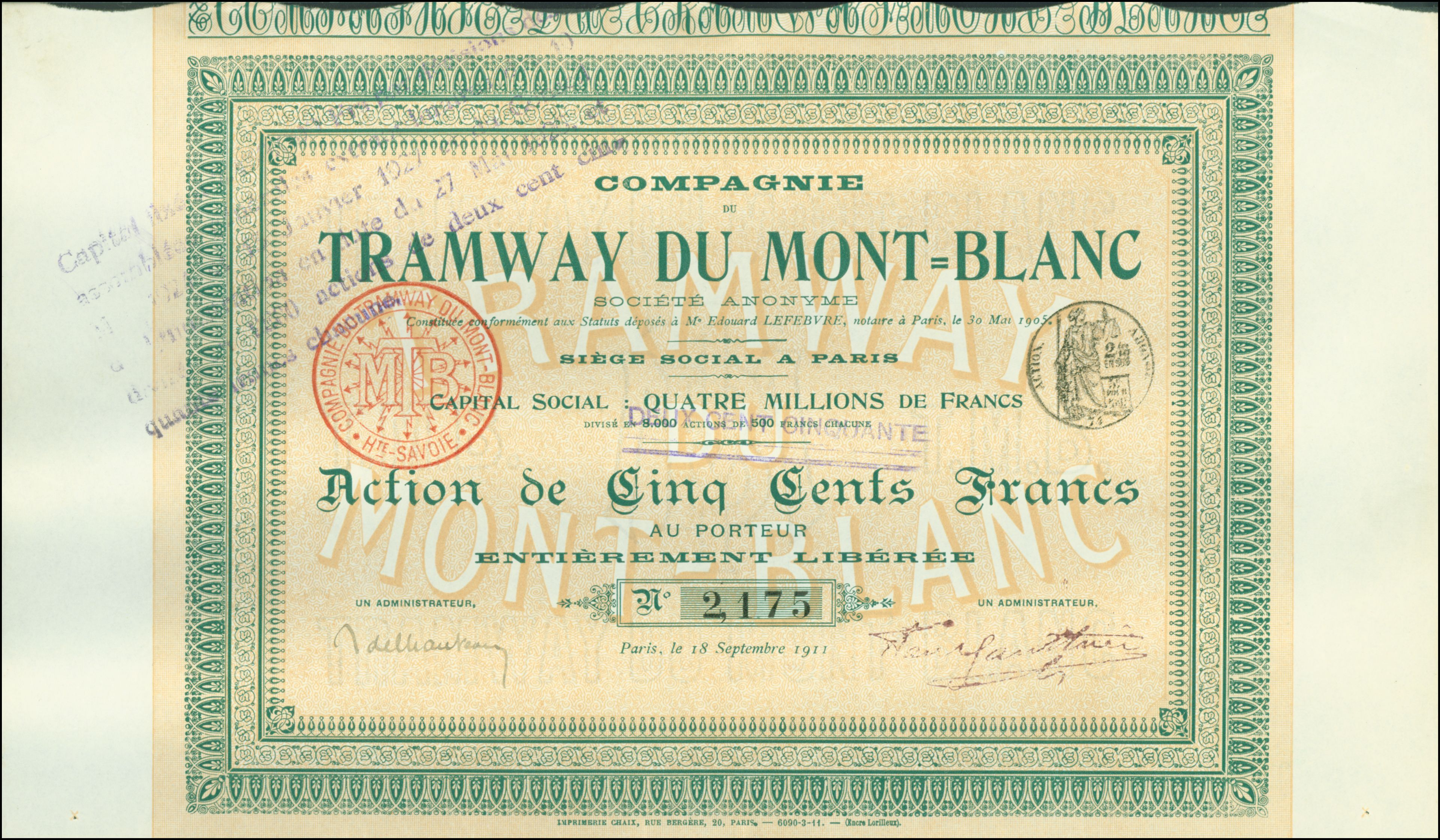
Share of the Compagnie du Tramway du Mont-Blanc, issued 18. September 1911

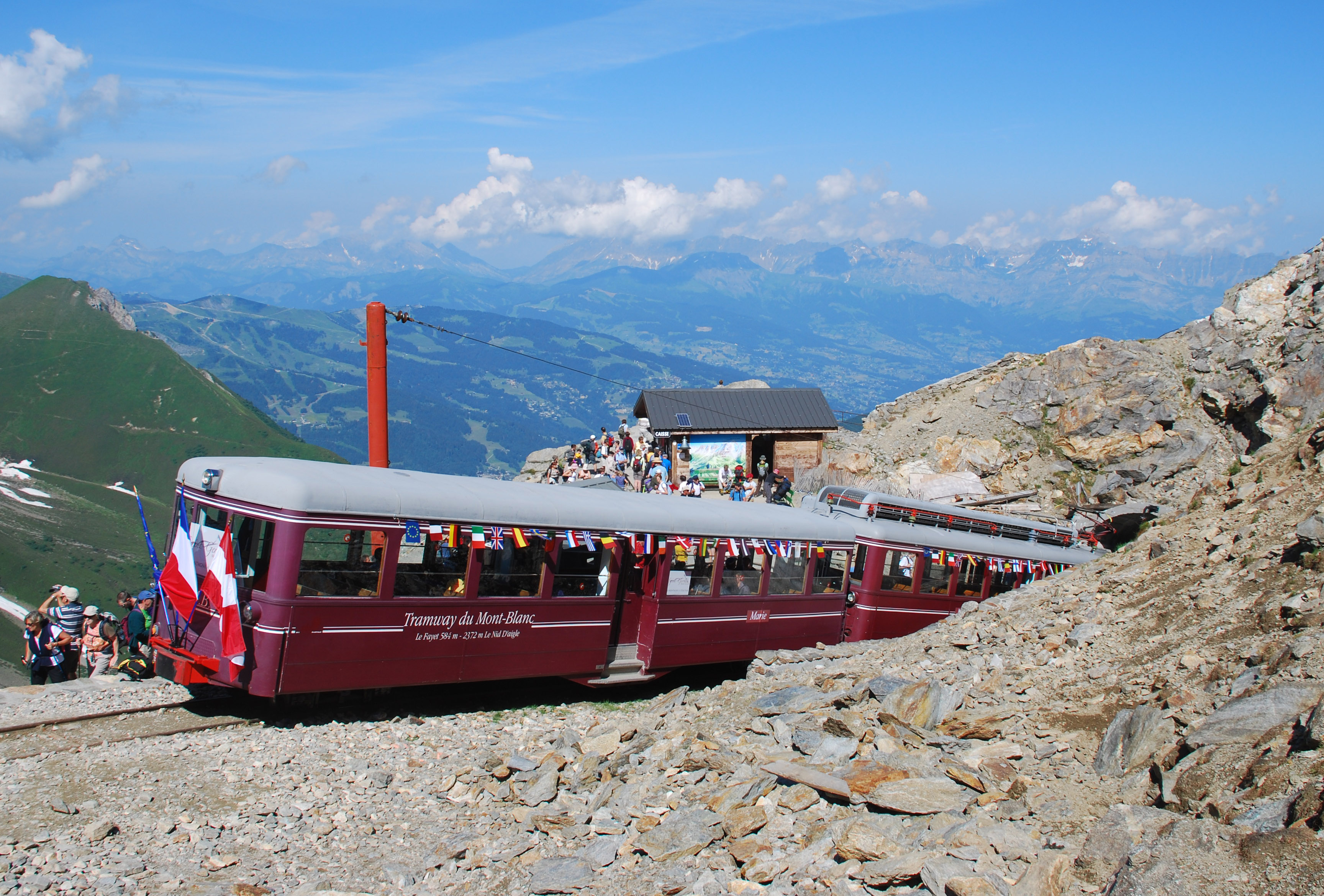
The former Nid-d'Aigle station, replaced by Refuge-du-Nid-d'Aigle

The Mont Blanc tramway (French: Tramway du Mont-Blanc, pronounced [tʁamwɛ dy mɔ̃ blɑ̃], TMB) is a mountain railway line in the Haute-Savoie department of France. It is the highest in France and the fourth highest in Europe. It is also the only railway in France reaching over 2,000 metres above sea level.

The extensive views of Mont Blanc and adjacent mountains of the Mont Blanc massif provided by the tramway make it popular with tourists. Also, mountaineers and hikers use the tramway because its stops provide the jumping off points for many trails, as well as giving access to the refuge Nid d'Aigle close to the terminus of the railway. The normal alpine mountaineering route to climb Mont Blanc starts at the tramway's terminus, Nid d'Aigle, and proceeds either to an overnight stop at the Tête Rousse Hut, or at the higher Goûter Hut.

== Location ==
The line runs from a connection with the SNCF at Saint-Gervais-les-Bains Le Fayet station to the Refuge-du-Nid-d'Aigle station near the Bionnassay Glacier at an altitude of 2,412 m (7,913 ft). The initial intention was for the line to reach the much higher Aiguille du Goûter. Nevertheless, it remains one of the highest railways in Europe and the second-highest when considering only open-air railways. The Refuge-du-Nid-d'Aigle and Mont-Lachat (2,074 m (6,804 ft)), the two highest stations of the line, are the only railway stations over 2,000 metres in France. Both are well over the tree line.

== Technology ==
The line is 12.79 km (7.9 mi) long and has a rail gauge of 1,000 mm (3 ft 3 3/8 in). It is a rack and adhesion railway, using the Strub rack system to overcome a height difference of 1,820 m (5,970 ft). The line has an average gradient of 15% and a maximum gradient of 24%. Some 85% of the line is equipped with rack rail, with adhesion being used at the foot of the line and at intermediate crossing stations. The line is electrified using an overhead line at 11 kV and 50 Hz AC.

== Operations ==
The line was operated by the Compagnie du Mont-Blanc which also managed the Montenvers Railway and many ski lifts in the Mont Blanc region. Since May 18, 2026, the Département de la Haute-Savoie has officially taken over the management of the Tramway du Mont-Blanc (TMB). This shift transitioned the historic mountain railway from a private concession operated by the Compagnie du Mont-Blanc to a direct public administration via a newly created departmental "régie".

The first section of the line, to the Col de Voza, was opened in 1909. The line reached its current terminus in August 1914 when work was suspended, because of World War I, and never resumed. The line was worked by steam locomotives until it was electrified in 1956. The journey time is one hour from Fayet to Bellevue with four or five trips operating per day.

In late July 2010 the last section of the Tramway and the nearby Nid d'Aigle mountain refuge was closed for safety reasons for the rest of the operational season. This was due to concerns of a repeat of a potentially catastrophic flood from release of a vast quantity of water that had built up within an intraglacial pocket within the Tête Rousse glacier lying directly above it.

== Rolling stock ==
When the line was electrified in 1956, three electric multiple units were purchased named Marie, Jeanne and Anne. In 2023 these were replaced by four Stadler EMUs, named Marie, Jeanne, Anne and Marguerite after the daughters of the original operating company's founder. The new trains have a maximum speed of 20 km/h (12 mph), compared to 15 km/h (9.3 mph) for the old ones, and will reduce journey times.

== Gallery ==
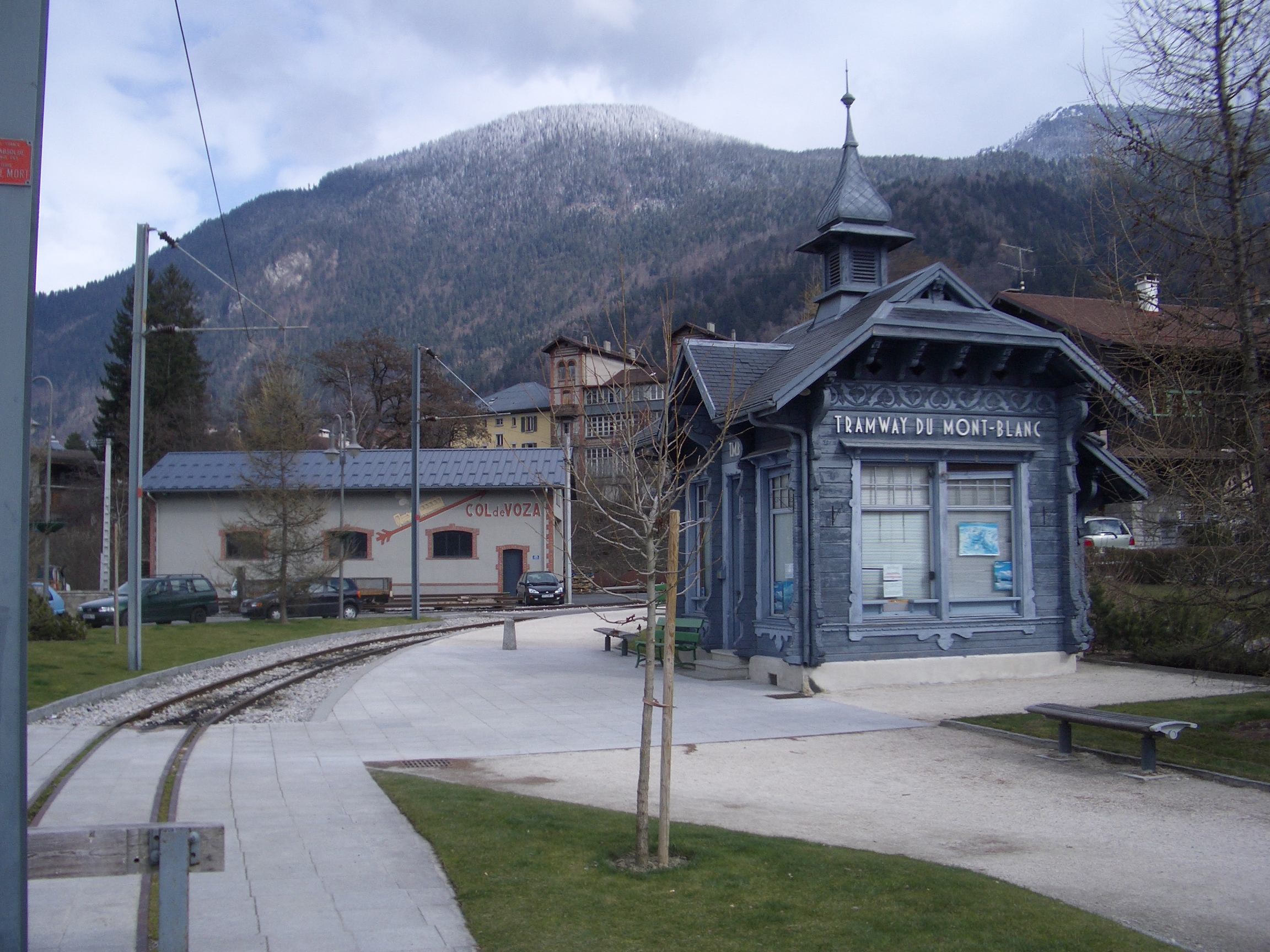
Terminus at Saint-Gervais-Le-Fayet (1)

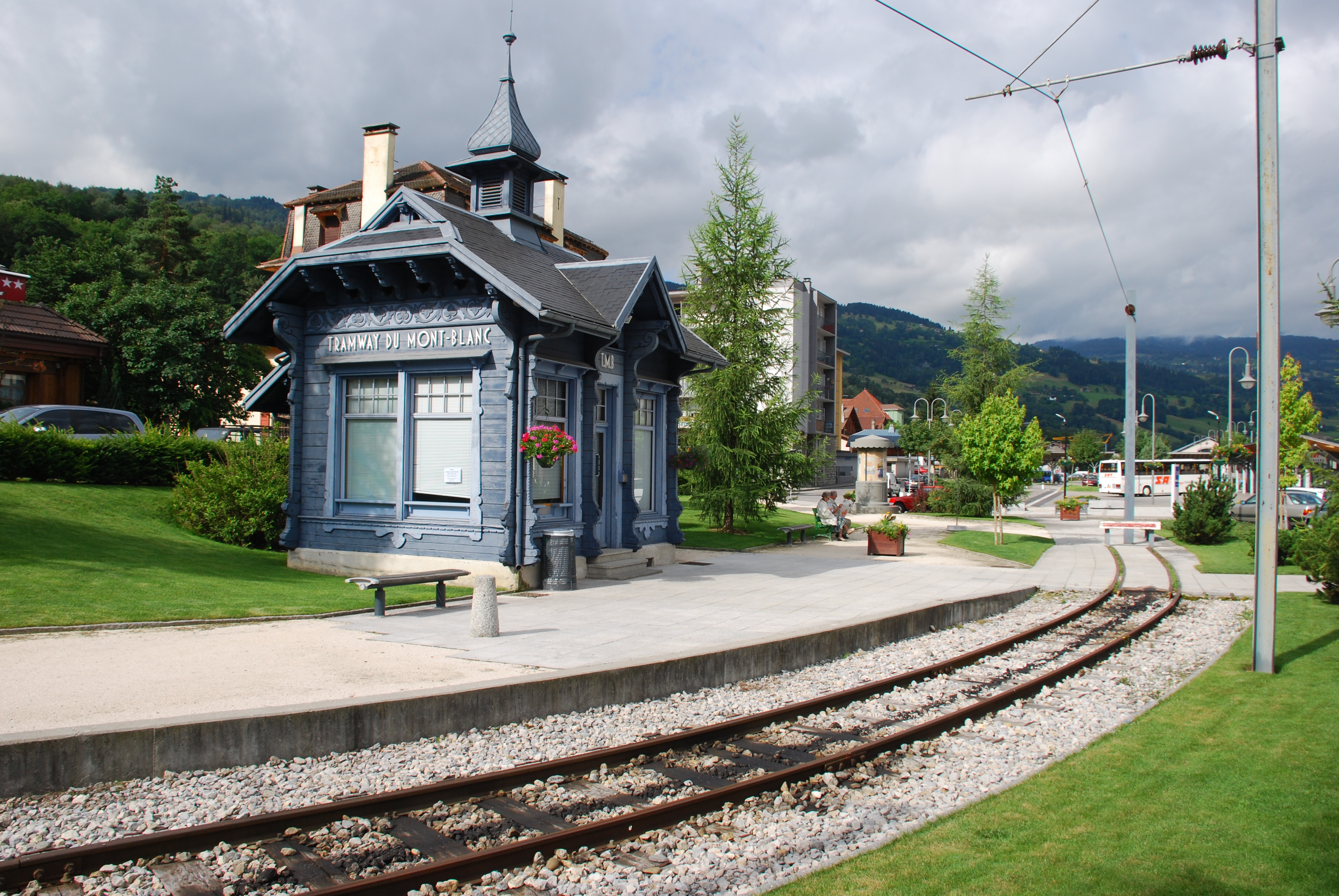
Terminus at Saint-Gervais-Le-Fayet (2)

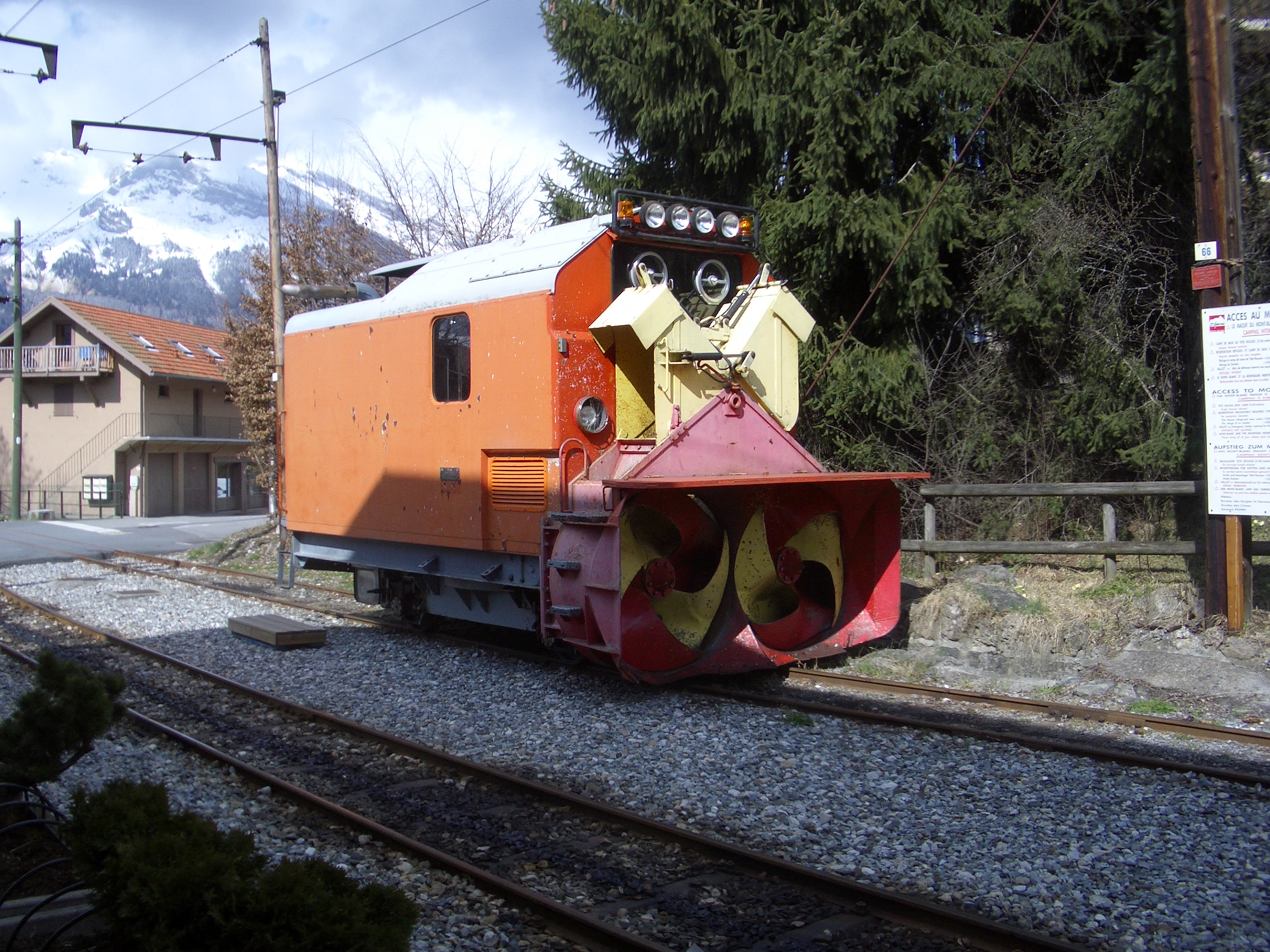
Snow blower

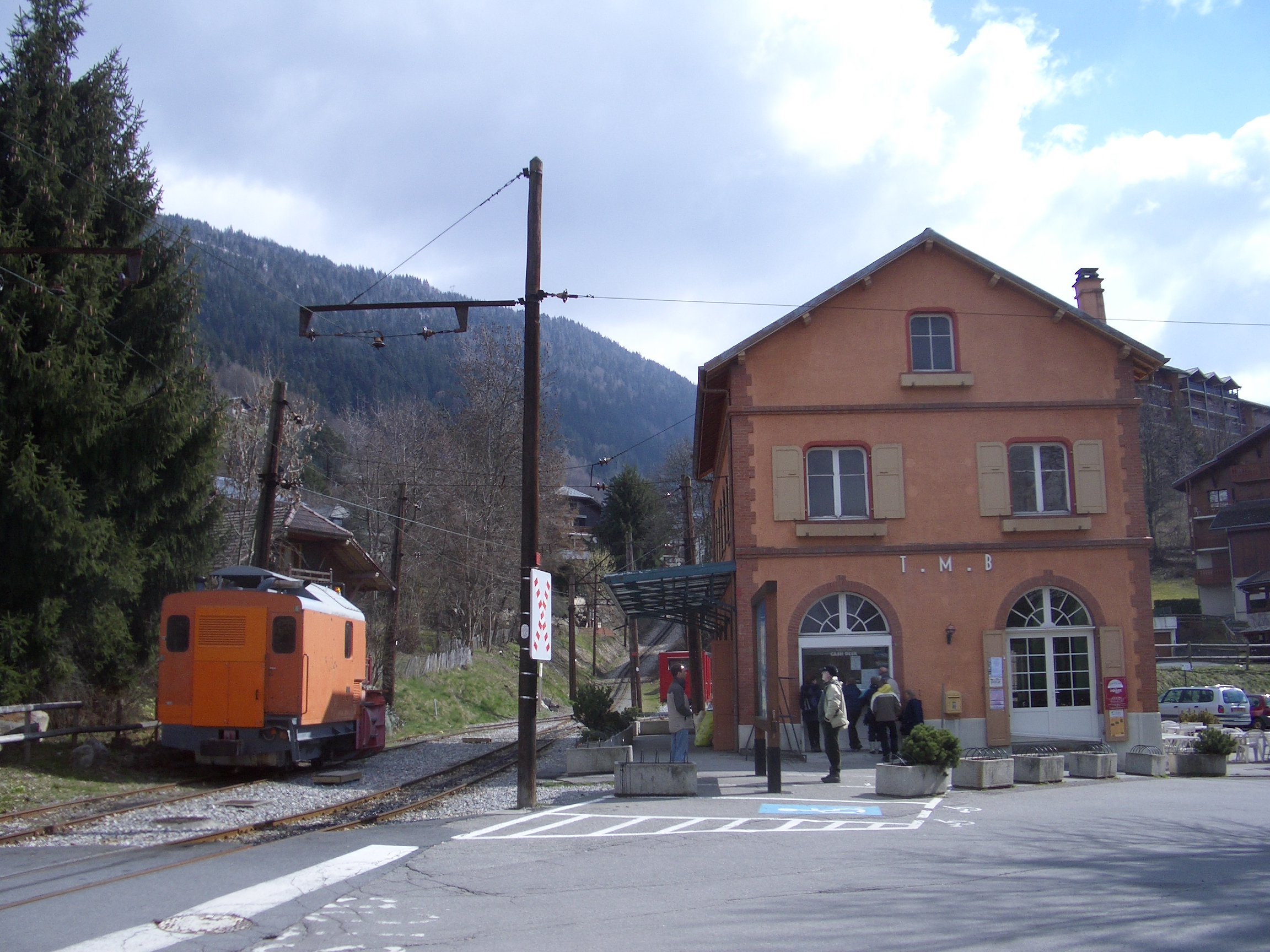
Saint-Gervais-Ville station

== See also ==
- Chemin de fer du Montenvers
