= Chemin de fer du Montenvers =

Rack railway line in Haute-Savoie, France

Coordinates: 45°55′54″N 6°55′03″E

Chemin de fer du Montenvers Montenvers Railway
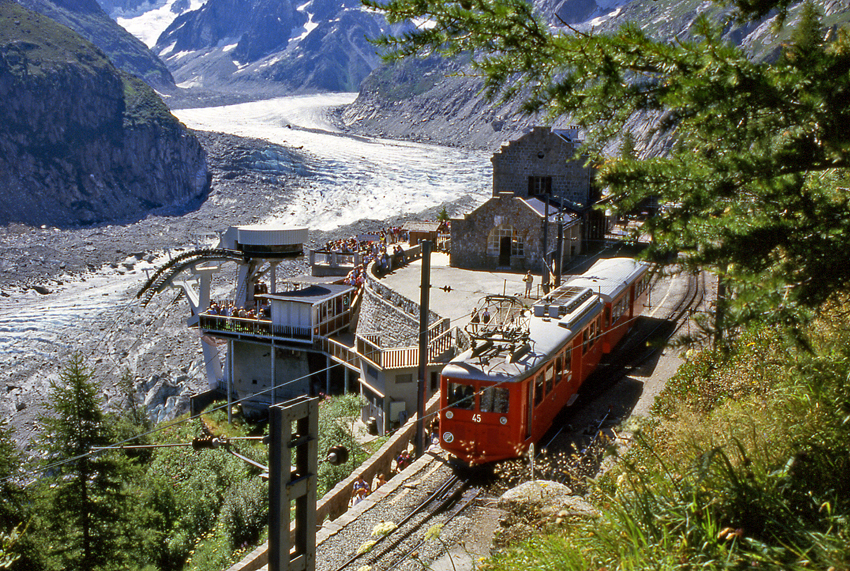
- Train leaving Montenvers-Mer de Glace station with the Mer de Glace in the background

Overview
- Status: Operational
- Owner: Department of Haute-Savoie
- Locale: Haute-Savoie, France
- Termini: Chamonix-Montenvers; Montenvers-Mer de Glace
- Stations: 4

Service
- Type: Rack railway
- Operator(s): Compagnie du Mont-Blanc (1954–2024); Régie départementale du Train du Montenvers (2024–present)

History
- Opened: 1909; 117 years ago

Technical
- Line length: 5.1 km (3.2 mi)
- Num of tracks: Single track
- Rack system: Strub
- Track gauge: 1,000 mm (3 ft 3 3/8 in)
- Electrification: 11 kV 50 Hz Catenary
- Highest elevation: 1,913 m (6,276 ft)
- Maximum incline: 22%

The Montenvers Railway or Chemin de fer du Montenvers (French pronunciation: [ʃəmɛ̃ d(ə) fɛʁ dy mɔ̃tɑ̃vɛʁ]) is an alpine rack railway line in the Haute-Savoie department of France. It runs from Chamonix-Montenvers station in the valley in Chamonix (providing a connection with the SNCF service at Chamonix-Mont-Blanc station nearby) to Montenvers-Mer de Glace station near the Mer de Glace, at an altitude of 1,913 m (6,276 ft). Opened in 1909, it was electrified in 1954.

== Overview ==
The line is 5.1 km (3.2 mi) long and has a track gauge of 1,000 mm (3 ft 3 3/8 in). It is a rack and adhesion railway, using the Strub rack system to overcome a height difference of 871 m (2,858 ft). Except for the terminal stations, which are operated in adhesion mode, the line has a gradient varying from 11% to 22%.

The line is operated by the Compagnie du Mont-Blanc which also manages the Mont Blanc Tramway and many ski lifts in the Mont Blanc region. The first section of the line as far as Caillet opened in 1908 and the line was completed in 1909.

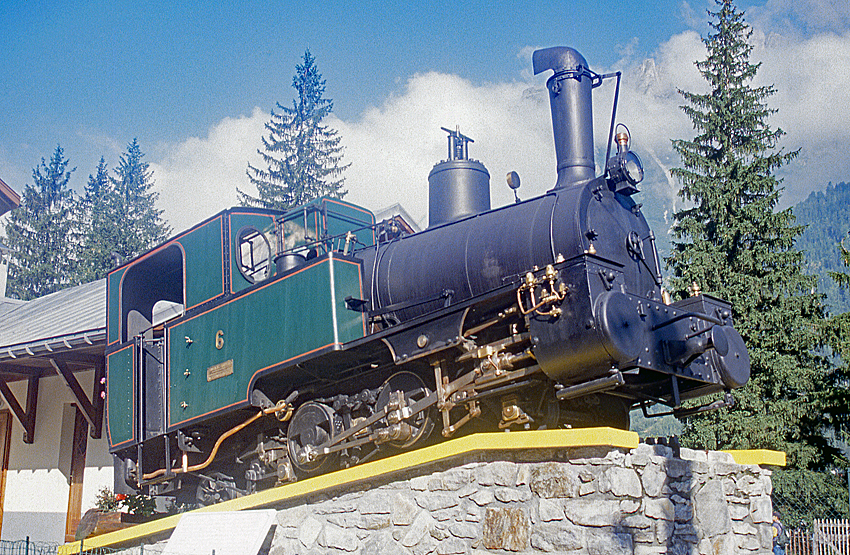
2-4-2T rack loco No 6 at Chamonix

The trains originally were drawn by steam locomotives built by SLM who supplied six 2-4-2T locomotives between 1908 and 1923. By 1953 the line was electrified, using an overhead line at 11 kV AC and 50 Hz, and service is provided by six electric railcars and trailers and three diesel locomotives, all from SLM. Trains run at 14 to 20 km/h (9 to 12 mph) and take 20 minutes for the journey.

A cable car connects the station at Montenvers with the glacier which is tunnelled out at that point enabling tourists to walk inside the glacier.

== Incidents ==
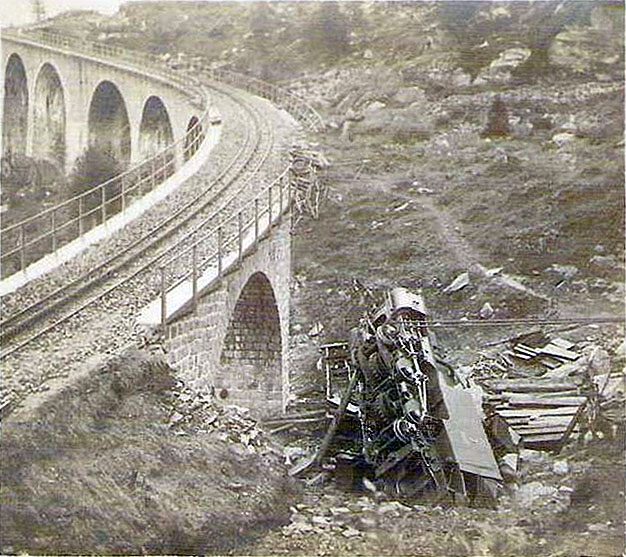
Accident 25 August 1927 on the Montenvers viaduct

On 25 August 1927, the locomotive and the first car of a two-car train derailed on the Montenvers viaduct, killing 15 people and injuring 30 others.

== See also ==
- Mont Blanc Tramway
- List of highest railways in Europe
