= Saint-Gervais–Vallorcine railway =

Railway in France

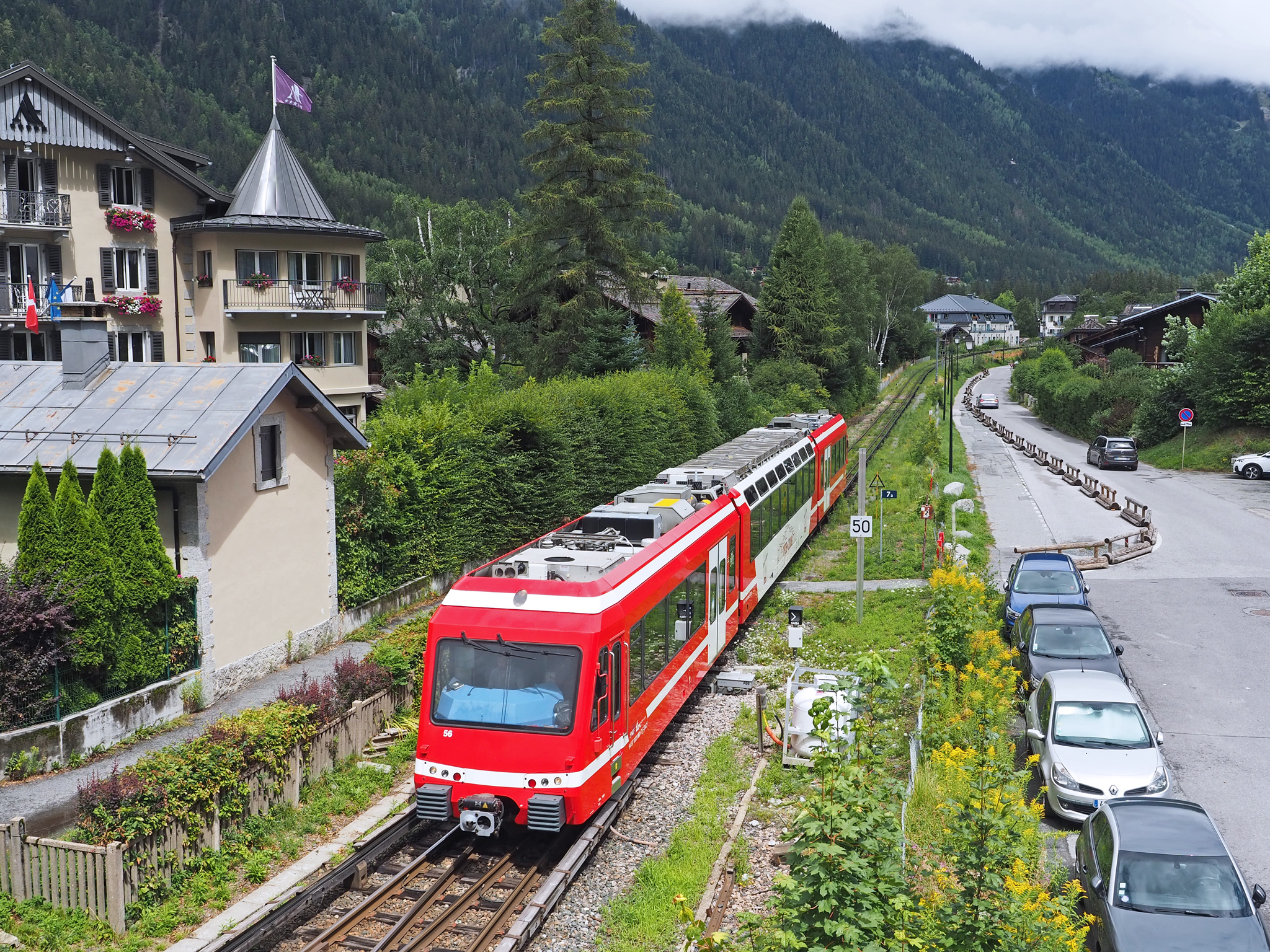
- Z 850 EMU in Chamonix

Overview
- Status: Operational
- Owner: SNCF
- Locale: Haute-Savoie, France
- Termini: Saint-Gervais-les-Bains-Le Fayet; Vallorcine (Swiss border)

History
- Opened: 1901–1908

Technical
- Rack system: None
- Track gauge: 1,000 mm (3 ft 3 3/8 in) metre gauge
- Electrification: 850 V DC third rail, top contact
- Highest elevation: 1,365 m (4,478 ft)
- Maximum incline: 9%

The Saint-Gervais–Vallorcine railway (French: Ligne de Saint-Gervais-les-Bains-Le Fayet à Vallorcine), also known as the Saint-Gervais–Vallorcine line, is a single-track 36.5 km (22.7 mi) long metre gauge railway in Haute-Savoie, France connecting the SNCF's Saint-Gervais-les-Bains-Le Fayet station with Vallorcine station and the Swiss border at Le Châtelard. It runs through Chamonix-Mont-Blanc station, where it provides a connection to the touristic Chemin de fer du Montenvers.

Opened in stages between 1901 and 1908 by the Chemins de fer de Paris à Lyon et à la Méditerranée (PLM), it was assigned number 896 in the SNCF-operated French national rail network as far as Vallorcine. To Le Châtelard (3 km or 1.86 mi) it is run by the Swiss company Transports de Martigny et Régions (TMR), which operates the adjacent Martigny–Châtelard Railway. Trains on the Saint-Gervais–Martigny service are branded "Mont-Blanc Express".

It is widely considered one of the most scenic railways nationally, along with the Marseille–Ventimiglia, Miramas–L'Estaque and Nice–Digne railways in southern France.

== History ==
- 1886: Granting of the concession for the Cluses–Chamonix line to the PLM (first concession for a general interest electric line in France)
- 3 July 1893: Authorisation for the PLM to build the Saint-Gervais to Chamonix section as metre gauge
- June 1899: Start of works on the first section
- 25 July 1901: Opening to Chamonix, 19 km or 11.81 mi (official opening on 12 July)
- 25 July 1906: Extension to Argentière
- 1 November 1907: Boring of the Col des Montets tunnel
- 1 July 1908: Junction with the Martigny–Châtelard Railway
- 1958: Introduction of Z 600 EMUs
- 1997: Introduction of Z 800 EMUs
- 2006: Introduction of Z 850 EMUs; frequency increase between Argentière and Vallorcine
- 17 July 2009: Official opening of Chamonix-Aiguille-du-Midi station

== Geography ==
=== Stations ===
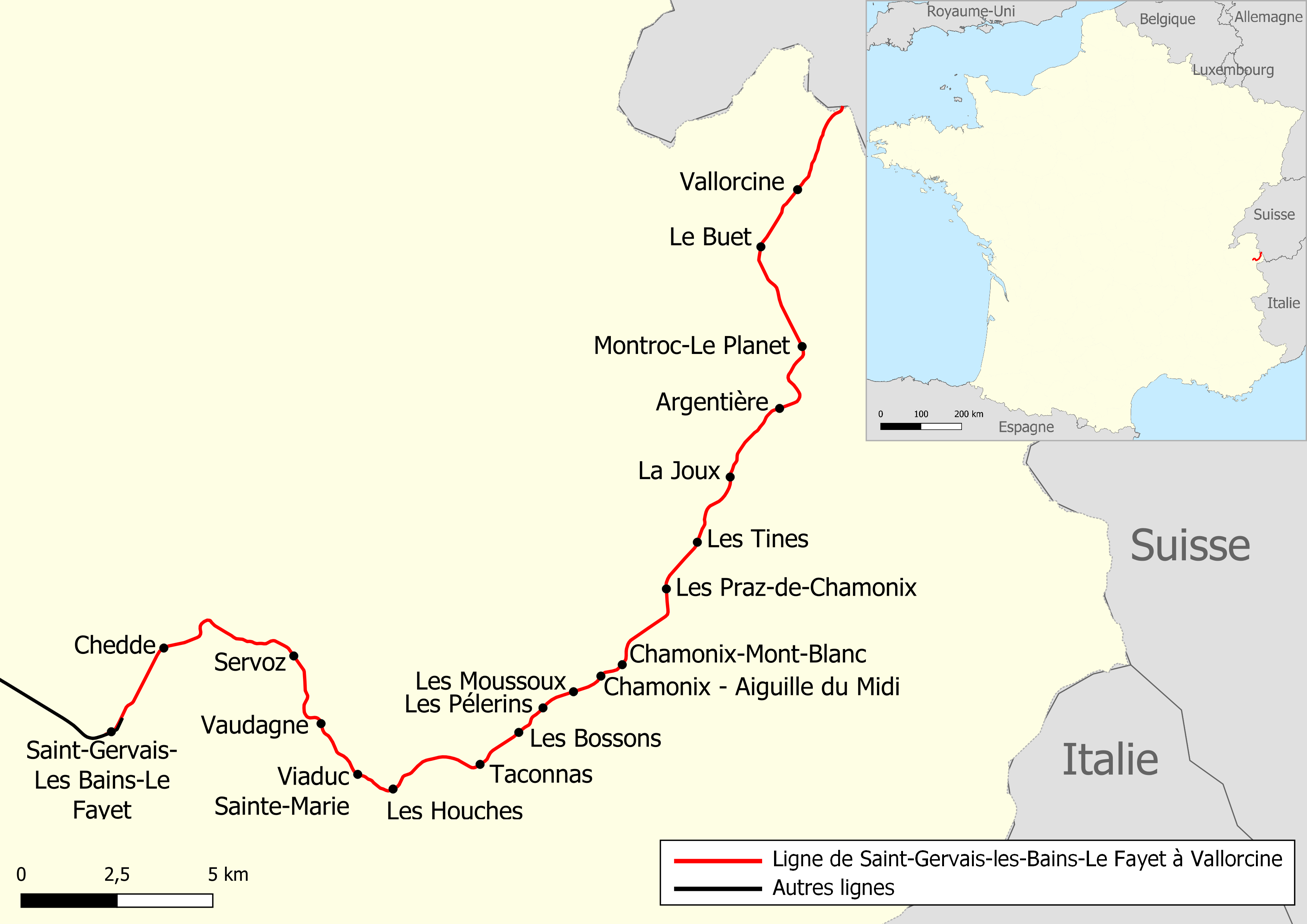
Line map

- Saint-Gervais-les-Bains-Le Fayet
- Chedde
- Servoz
- Vaudagne (request stop)
- Viaduc Sainte Marie (request stop)
- Les Houches
- Taconnaz (request stop)
- Les Bossons
- Les Pélerins
- Les Moussoux (request stop)
- Aiguille du Midi
- Chamonix Mont-Blanc
- Les Praz
- Les Tines
- La Joux (request stop)
- Argentière
- Montroc-le Planet
- Le Buet
- Vallorcine
- Le Châtelard-Frontière (in Switzerland)

=== Connections ===
- At Saint-Gervais-les-Bains Le Fayet, with the standard gauge SNCF line from Aix-les-Bains via Annecy and La Roche-sur-Foron (including TGVs from Paris in the winter); and the Mont Blanc tramway (TMB) rack railway.
- At Chamonix, with the Montenvers Railway, a rack railway.
- In Switzerland, at Le Châtelard, with the Martigny-Châtelard rack railway, which continues to Martigny where it connects with the Lausanne–Brig line of the CFF.

== Technical information ==
- Track gauge: 1,000 mm (3 ft 3 3/8 in).
- Profile: uphill from the Saint-Gervais-Le Fayet (altitude: 581 m (1,906 ft)) to the col des Montets tunnel (altitude 1,365 m (4,478 ft)) then downhill to the border (altitude 1,100 m (3,600 ft)). The steepest grade, between Servoz and les Houches is 9% over 2,000 m (6,600 ft), a record for an adhesion railway. On the steepest sections (4% and more), it had a central rail for braking (and keeping trains immobile in case of electric black-outs), through jaws gripping the rail; it was removed around 1980.
- Electrification through top-contact third rail at 850 V (580 V originally) direct current.
- Main structures:
  - Three viaducts, including the Sainte-Marie viaduct in the Houches over the Arve
  - Several anti-avalanche galleries
  - Col des Montets tunnel, 1,883 m (6,178 ft) long.
- Control: A command post, named PC Éclair (ECLAIR, or “lightning”, standing for Exploitation Centralisée des Lignes Assistée par Informatique et Radio, which translates to Centralised Control of the Lines Assisted by Computers and Radio), installed in 1991 at Saint-Gervais station, allows centralised control with the help of radio and computers.

== Rolling stock ==
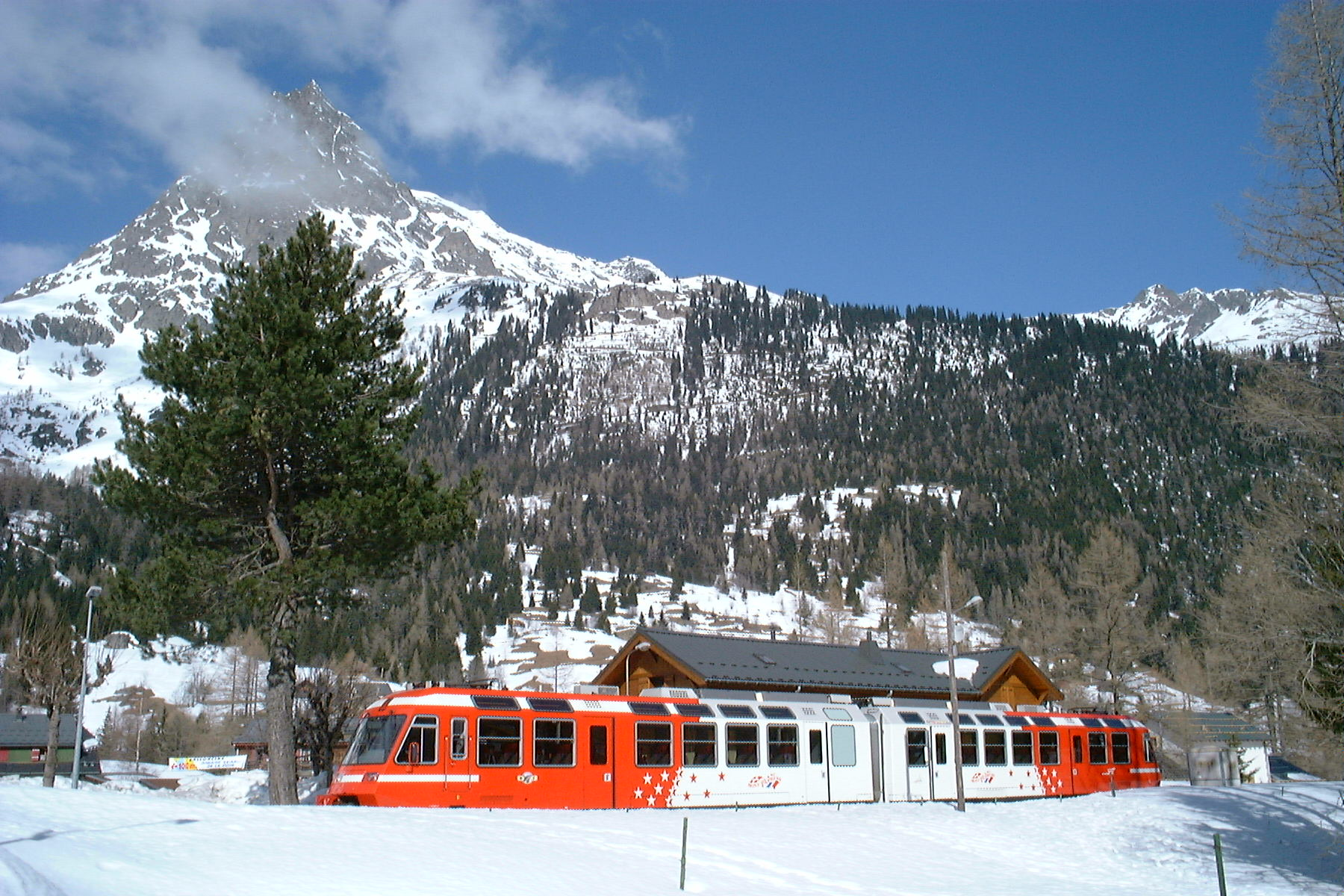
A Z 800 trainset at Le Buet.

- Three Z 850 electric multiple units (EMUs) made by Stadler. Three additional trainsets were slated to arrive before 2008.
- Five Z 800 105-seat EMUs, delivered in 1997 by ADTranz and Vevey Technologies in a joint purchase with the Martigny-Châtelard. This 1000 kW stock, composed of two motor cars, can run at 70 km/h (43.5 mph); it is rack and pinion equipped, and has pantographs in addition to 3rd rail equipment, so that it run to Martigny.
- Eight Z 600 EMUs and four additional trailers (some out of service), used in busy periods.
- Snowploughs:
  - Z 691 (electric)
  - Beilhack CN4 (diesel)
- Seven Z890 Stadler manufactured two car EMUs are scheduled for delivery in 2025 and entry into service in 2026 to replace the Z 800s.
- The original Z 200 motor cars have been retired.
- Service wagons: Flats (U 20201 - U 20203) and ballast-carrying (U 20204 and U 20205 (?)).

== Activity ==
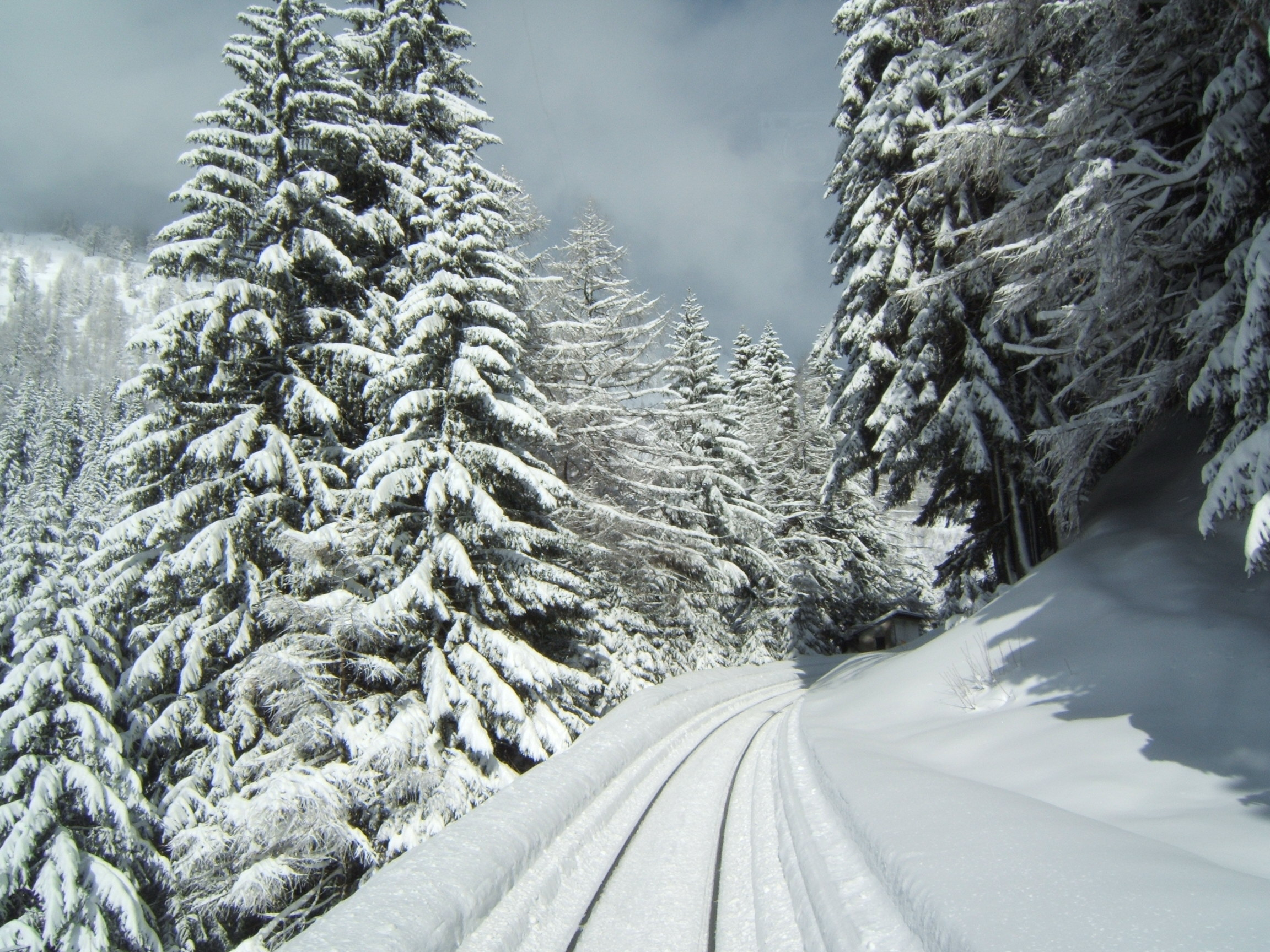
Line between Argentière and Montroc

This line carries about 500,000 passengers per year, with wide variation: from 500 people per day in the least busy periods up to 10,000 per day in summer and 2500 per day in winter for the ski season. The customer base is quite diverse, from international travellers connecting with the TGVs, to local transportation, most notably for schoolchildren. It is a tourist line and a public service at the same time.

Through trains between Saint-Gervais and Martigny run under the "Mont-Blanc Express" brand.

Since 2005 travel has been free between Servoz and Vallorcine for those with a Chamonix residency card and for valley inhabitants.
