= List of highest railway stations in Europe =

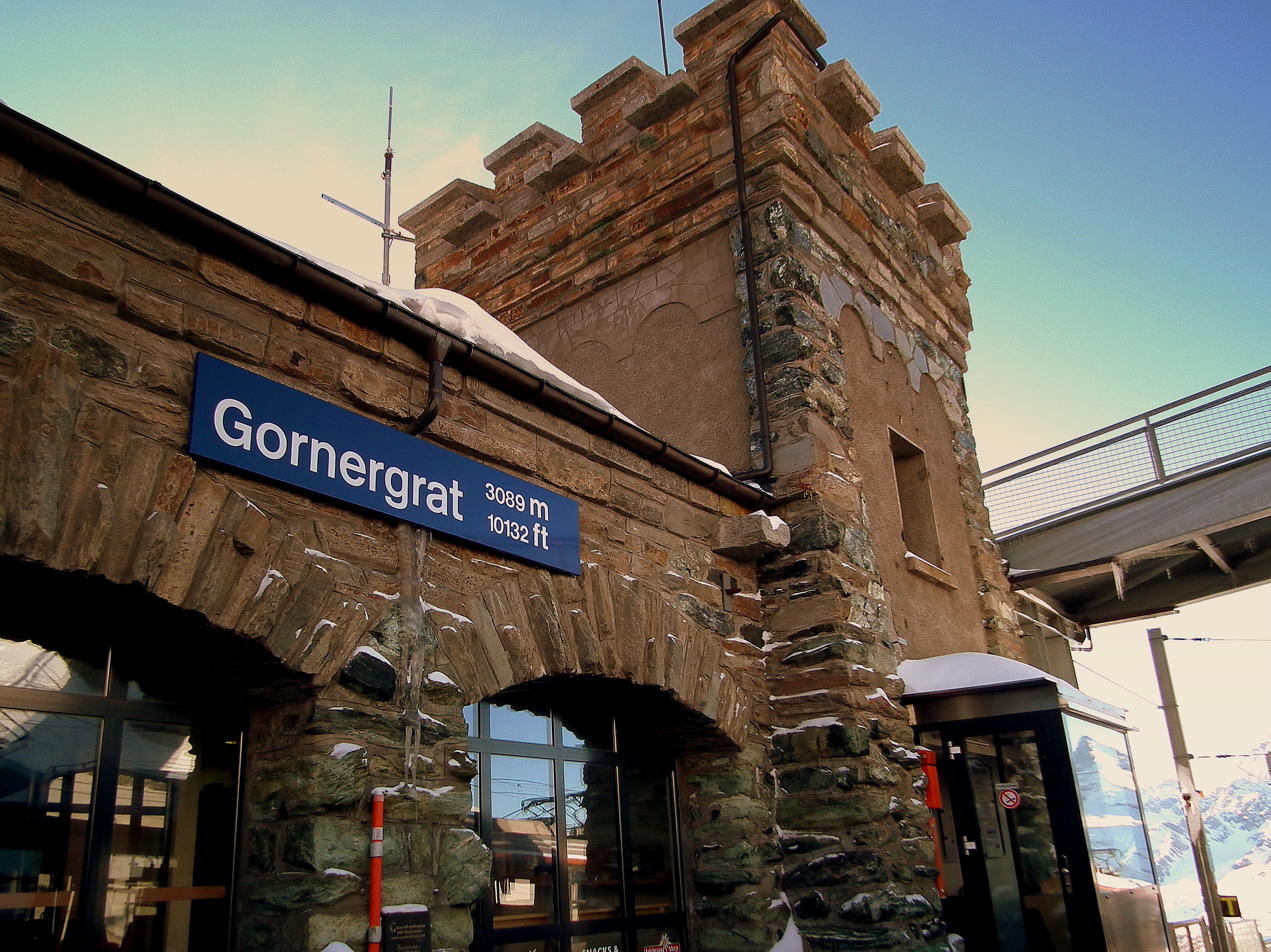
The Gornergrat railway station, the highest (open-air) railway station building on the continent

This is a list of high-altitude railway stations in Europe. It includes any railway station or location with passenger railway services (on adhesion or rack railways), located at an elevation of over 2,000 metres above sea level. These are all found in the Alps in three countries: Switzerland (20), France (2) and Germany (1). At this elevation, typically above the tree line, snow becomes the main form of precipitation, therefore making railways more difficult to maintain and operate. For a list by railway line, with a lower elevation cutoff, see list of highest railways in Europe.

In the list are indicated the elevation, region, country, railway and nearest location, inhabited or not.

== Main list ==
Station	Elevation	Region	Country	Railway	Location	Notes
Jungfraujoch	3,454 m (11,332 ft)	Valais	Switzerland	Jungfrau	Jungfraujoch	Terminus, underground
Eismeer	3,160 m (10,367 ft)	Bern	Switzerland	Jungfrau	Eismeer	Underground
Gornergrat	3,090 m (10,138 ft)	Valais	Switzerland	Gornergrat	Gornergrat	Terminus, highest open-air station in Europe
Eigerwand	2,865 m (9,400 ft)	Bern	Switzerland	Jungfrau	Eiger north face	Underground
Rotenboden	2,815 m (9,236 ft)	Valais	Switzerland	Gornergrat	Rotenboden	
Zugspitzplatt	2,588 m (8,491 ft)	Bavaria	Germany	Zugspitze	Zugspitzplatt	Terminus, underground, highest station in Germany
Riffelberg	2,582 m (8,471 ft)	Valais	Switzerland	Gornergrat	Riffelberg	
Refuge-du-Nid-d'Aigle	2,412 m (7,913 ft)	Auvergne-Rhône-Alpes	France	Mont Blanc	Refuge du Nid d'Aigle	Terminus, highest station in France
Eigergletscher	2,320 m (7,612 ft)	Bern	Switzerland	Jungfrau	Eiger Glacier	
Ospizio Bernina	2,253 m (7,392 ft)	Graubünden	Switzerland	Bernina	Ospizio Bernina	Highest rail crossing in Europe (summit)
Brienzer Rothorn	2,244 m (7,362 ft)	Bern	Switzerland	Brienz–Rothorn	Brienzer Rothorn	Terminus
Riffelalp Resort	2,222 m (7,290 ft)	Valais	Switzerland	Riffelalp tram	Riffelalp Resort	Terminus
Riffelalp	2,211 m (7,254 ft)	Valais	Switzerland	Gornergrat/Riffelalp tram	Riffelalp	Highest station in Europe with two distinct railways
Furka	2,163 m (7,096 ft)	Uri	Switzerland	Furka Cogwheel Steam Railway	East portal of Furka Summit Tunnel	Rail crossing (summit)
Muttbach-Belvédère	2,118 m (6,949 ft)	Valais	Switzerland	Furka Cogwheel Steam Railway	West portal of Furka Summit Tunnel	
Bernina Lagalb	2,100 m (6,890 ft)	Graubünden	Switzerland	Bernina	Bernina Lagalb	
Bernina Diavolezza	2,093 m (6,867 ft)	Graubünden	Switzerland	Bernina	Bernina Diavolezza	
Alp Grüm	2,091 m (6,860 ft)	Graubünden	Switzerland	Bernina	Alp Grüm	
Mont Lachat	2,074 m (6,804 ft)	Auvergne-Rhône-Alpes	France	Mont Blanc	Col du Mont Lachat	
Pilatus Kulm	2,073 m (6,801 ft)	Obwalden	Switzerland	Pilatus	Pilatus	Terminus
Kleine Scheidegg	2,061 m (6,762 ft)	Bern	Switzerland	Wengernalp/Jungfrau	Kleine Scheidegg	Rail crossing (summit), highest railway hub in Switzerland
Bernina Suot	2,046 m (6,713 ft)	Graubünden	Switzerland	Bernina	Bernina Suot	
Oberalp Pass	2,033 m (6,670 ft)	Uri	Switzerland	Andermatt–Chur	Oberalp Pass	Rail crossing (summit)

== By country ==
Country	Station	Elevation	Railway	Location	Notes
Switzerland	Jungfraujoch	3,454 m (11,332 ft)	Jungfrau	Jungfraujoch	Terminus, underground
Germany	Zugspitzplatt	2,588 m (8,491 ft)	Zugspitze	Zugspitzplatt	Terminus, underground
France	Refuge-du-Nid-d'Aigle	2,412 m (7,913 ft)	Mont Blanc	Nid d'Aigle	Terminus
Italy	San Nicola-Silvana Mansio	1,406 m (4,613 ft)	Ferrovia Silana	San Nicola Silano	
Norway	Finse Station	1,222 m (4,009 ft)	Bergen Line		
Czechia	Kubova Huť	995 m (3,264 ft)	Strakonice–Volary		
Poland	Polana Jakuszycka railway station	878 m (2,881 ft)	Izera railway		
Sweden	Storlien railway station	592 m (1,942 ft)	Central Line		

== See also ==
- List of busiest railway stations in Europe
- Rail transport in Europe
- List of highest railway stations in Switzerland
