= Riffelhorn =

Mountain in Switzerland

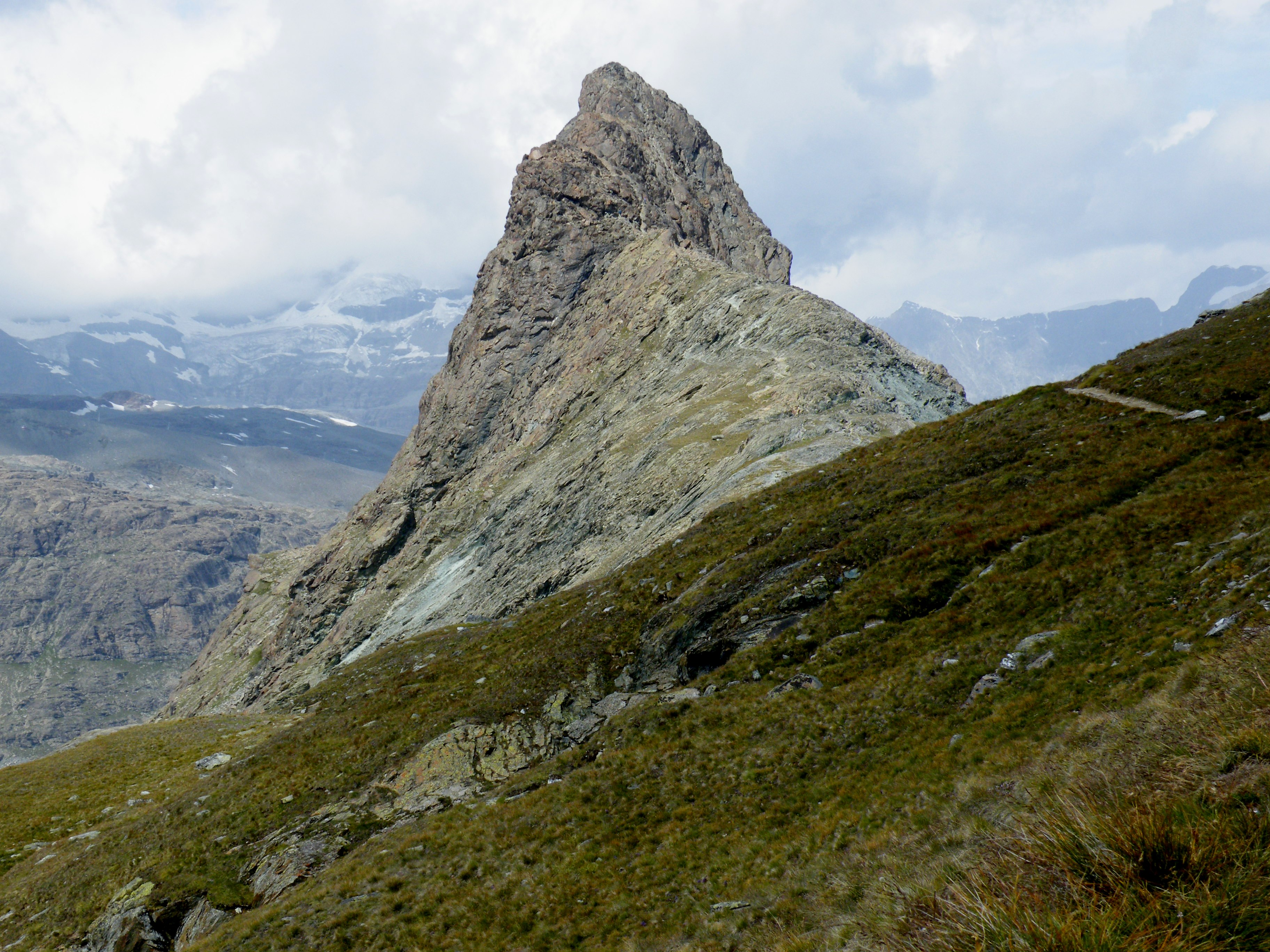
- Riffelhorn as seen from the east side

Highest point
- Elevation: 2,928 m (9,606 ft)
- Prominence: 152 m (499 ft)
- Coordinates: 45°58′52.8″N 7°45′29.7″E

Geography
- Location within Switzerland
- Location: Valais, Switzerland
- Parent range: Pennine Alps

The Riffelhorn (2,928 m) is a mountain in the Swiss section of the Pennine Alps, located south of Zermatt in the canton of Valais.

The Riffelhorn forms part of the Gorner ridge and provides excellent rock climbing facilities having several routes of a different Climbing grades. It has been used a long time by the local Alpine guides to train rock climbing skills for climbers before ascending on higher mountains.

It is also very popular view point being in the middle of one of the most famous valleys in the Alps, between the Matterhorn and Monte Rosa. Also the altitude of nearly 3,000 m gives a needed atmosphere of Alpine conditions. Nearest access is Rotenboden train station. Gornergratbahn continues from here up to summit of Gornergrat.

On the northern side of the mountain lies the Riffelsee.
