= Findelbach railway station =

Railway station in Zermatt, Switzerland

Findelbach
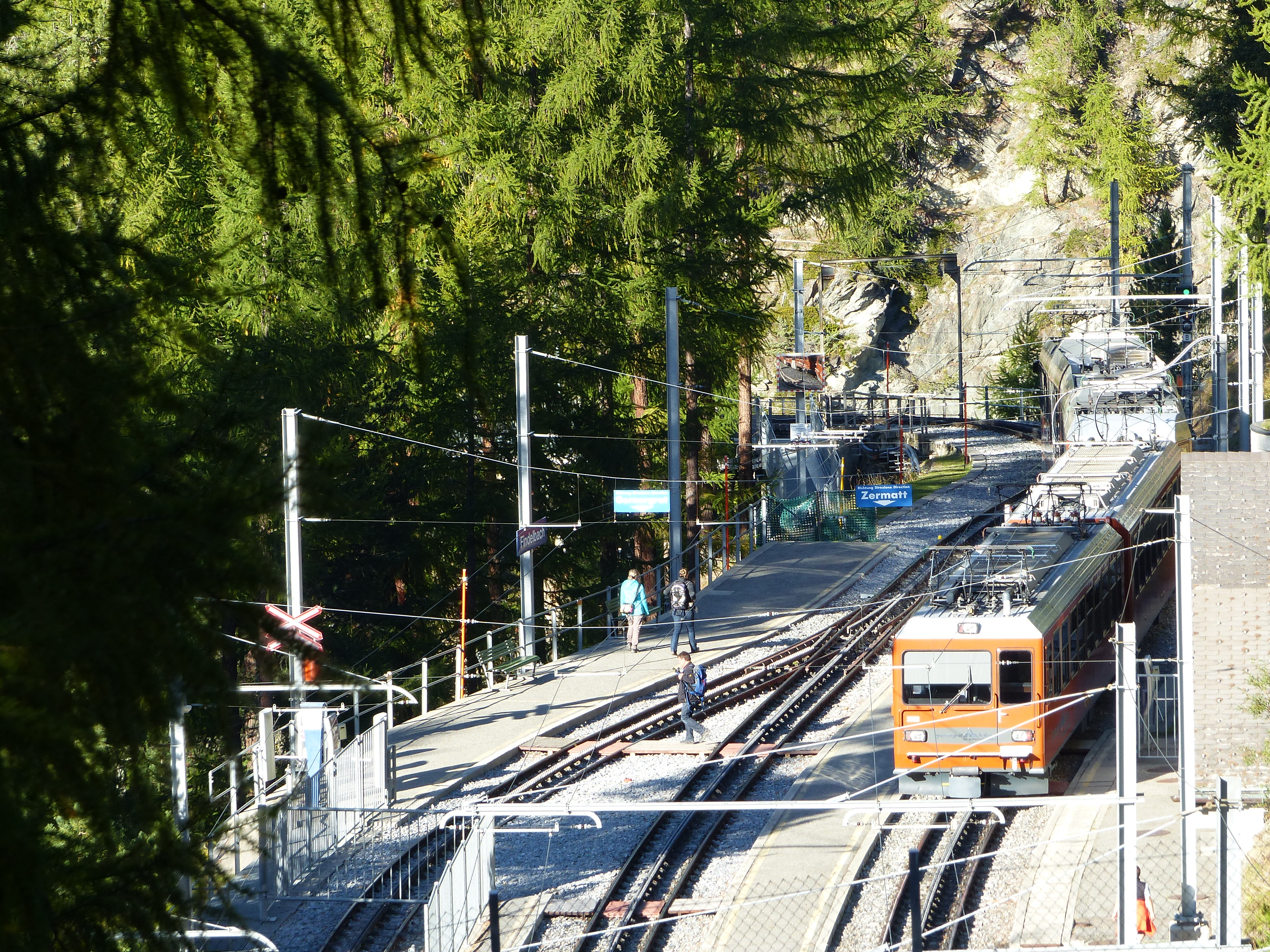

General information
- Location: Zermatt, Valais; Switzerland
- Coordinates: 46°01′N 7°45′E
- Elevation: 1,770 m (5,810 ft)
- Owner: Gornergrat Railway
- Line: Gornergrat line
- Distance: 1.75 km (1.09 mi) from Zermatt GGB
- Platforms: 2
- Tracks: 2
- Train operators: Gornergrat Railway

Other information
- Station code: 8501679 (FIND)

Services
Preceding station	Gornergrat Railway	Following station
Riffelalp towards Gornergrat	Gornergrat–Zermatt	Zermatt GGB Terminus
Location

Findelbach is a railway station on the Gornergrat railway, which links the resort of Zermatt with the summit of the Gornergrat. The station is situated in the municipality of Zermatt, in the Swiss canton of Valais, at an altitude of 1,770 m (5,810 ft) above mean sea level.

A freight station is situated at the end of a short branch line from Findelbach.

== Services ==
As of the December 2023 timetable change, the following services stop at Findelbach:

- Service every 24 minutes between Gornergrat and Zermatt GGB.

== Gallery ==
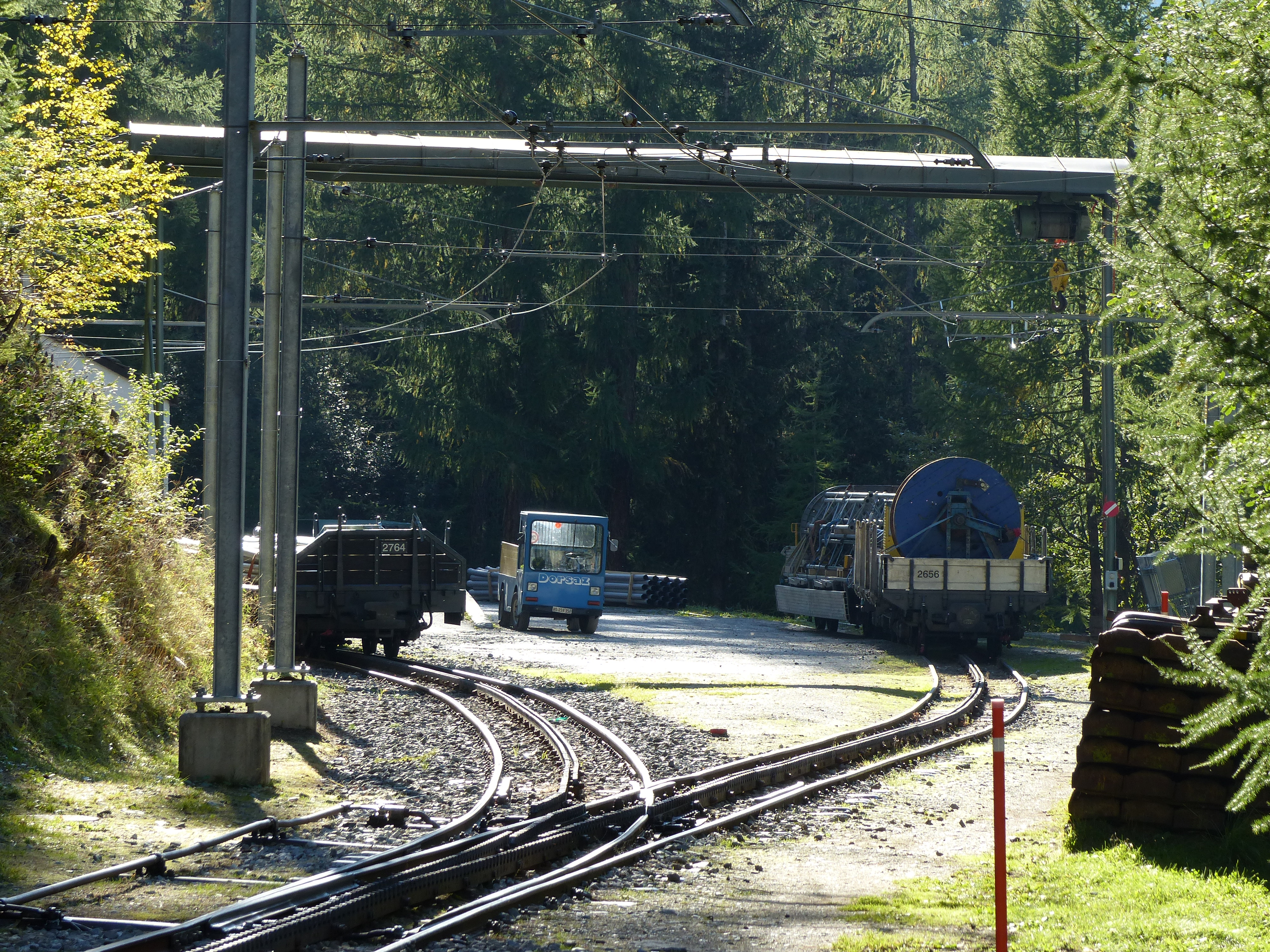
Branch to freight station

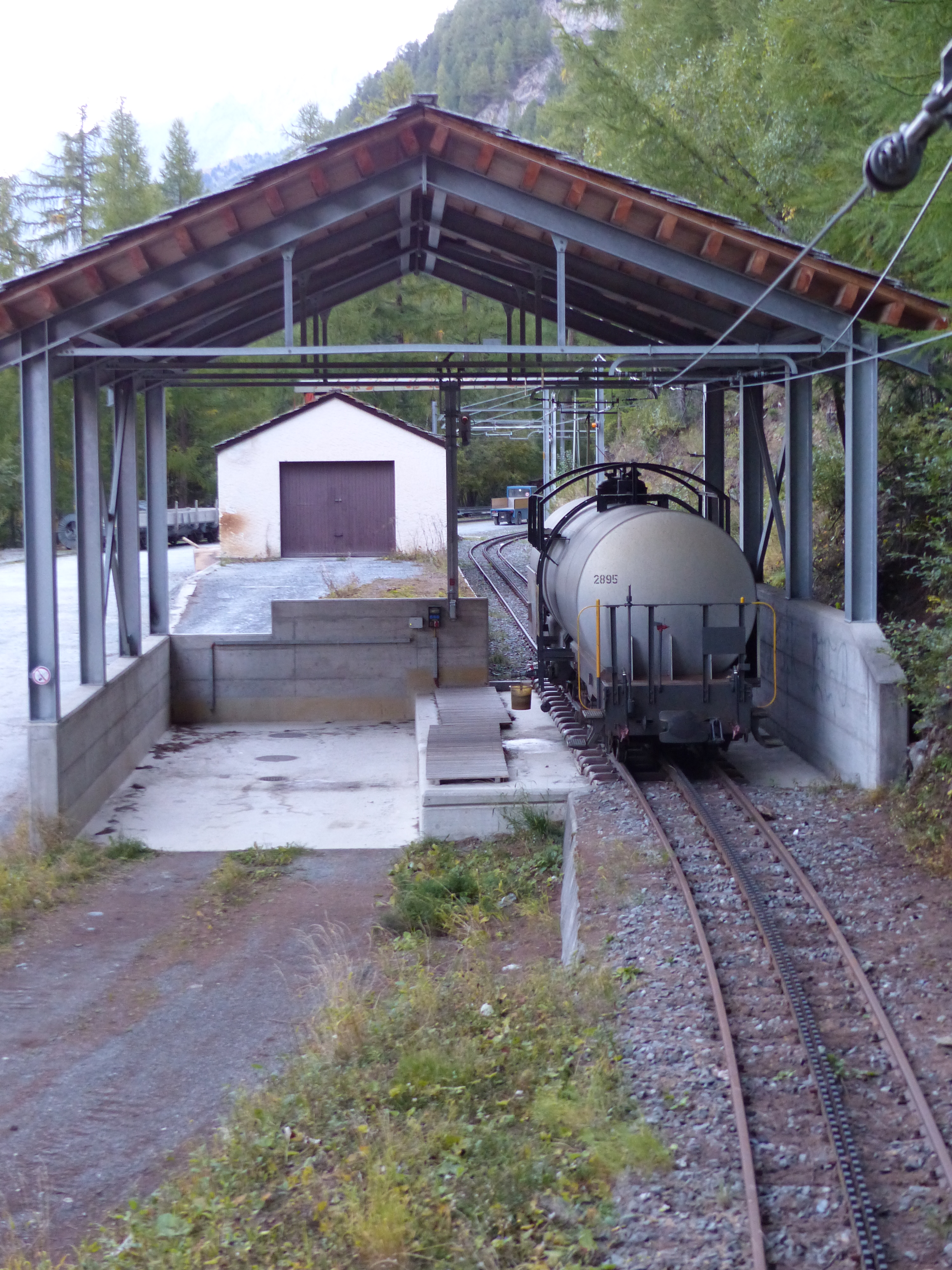
Freight station

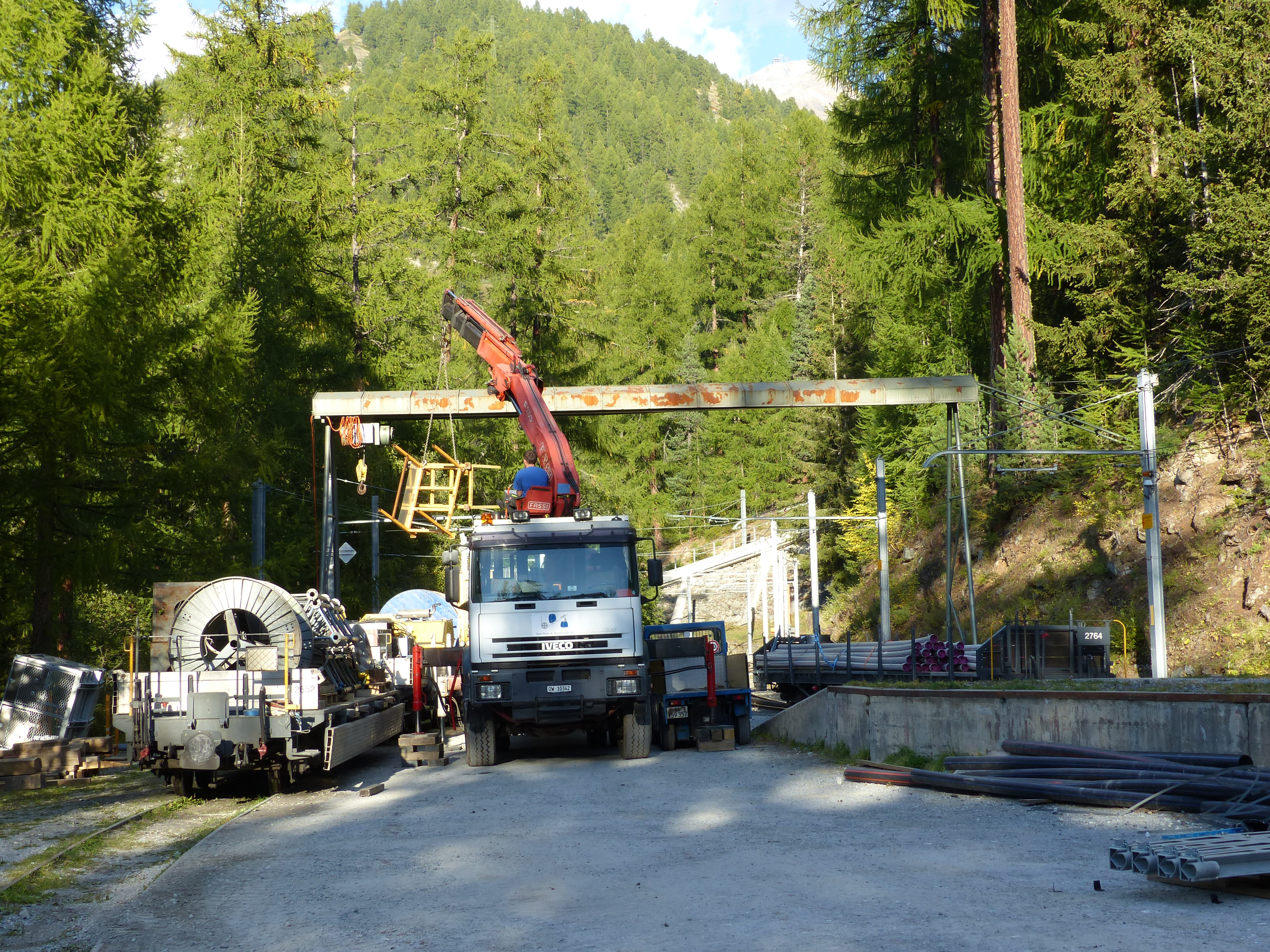
Freight station

== See also ==
- List of highest railway stations in Switzerland
