= Riffelsee =

Lake in Valais, Switzerland

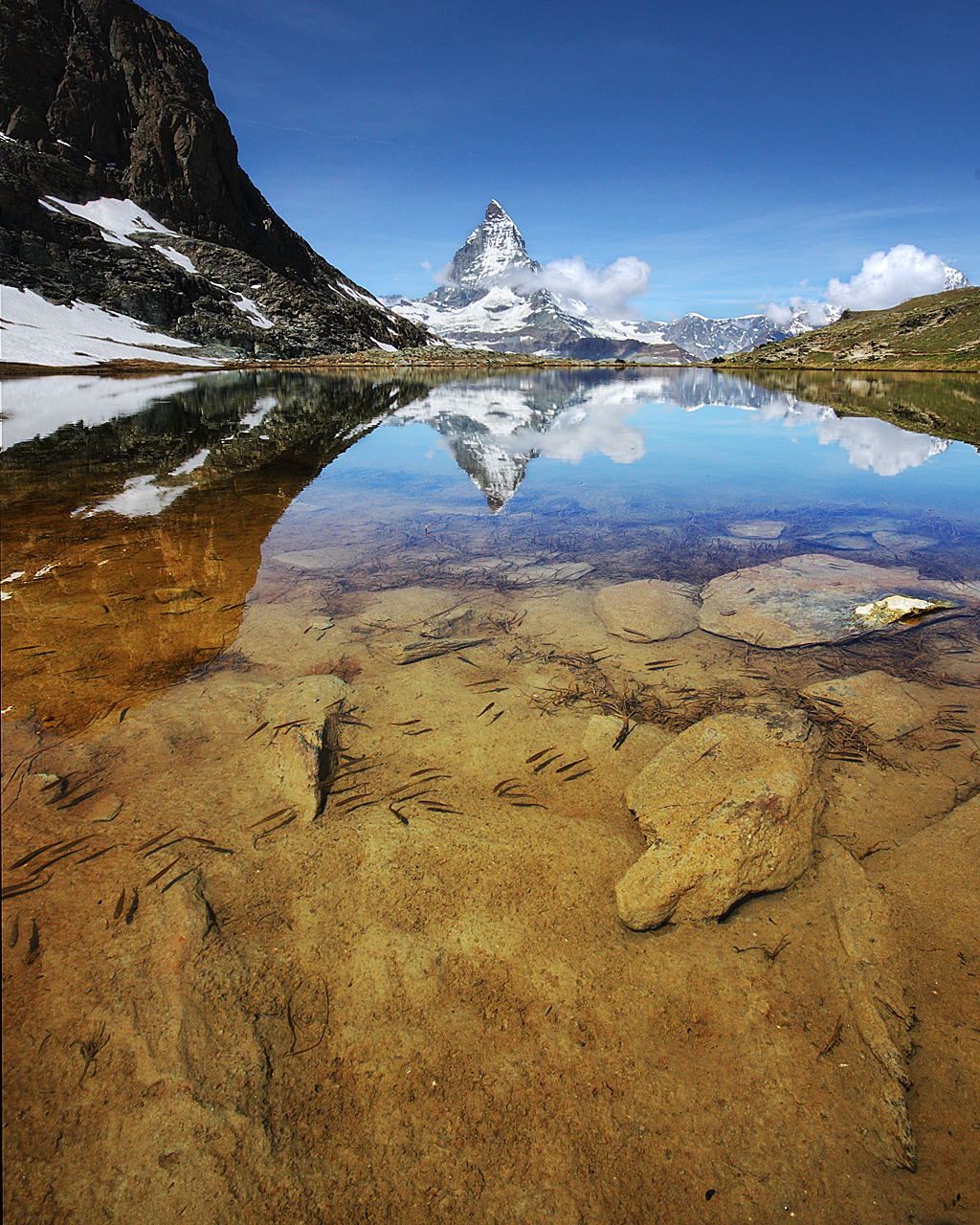
- Fish in Riffelsee with Matterhorn behind

- Location within Canton of Valais Location within Aosta Valley Location within Piedmont Location within Switzerland Location within Italy Location within Alps
- Interactive map of Riffelsee
- Location: Zermatt, Valais
- Coordinates: 45°59′0″N 7°45′44″E
- Catchment area: 20 ha (49 acres)
- Basin countries: Switzerland
- Surface area: 0.45 ha (1.1 acres)
- Max. depth: 4 m (13 ft)
- Surface elevation: 2,757 m (9,045 ft)

Riffelsee is an alpine lake above the town of Zermatt in the canton of Valais, Switzerland.

== Geography ==
It lies below the Riffelhorn at an elevation of 2757 m, and has a surface area of 0.45 ha. The lake can be reached from Rotenboden railway station (2815 m) on the Gornergratbahn mountain railway.
