= Riffelalp railway station =

Railway station in Zermatt, Switzerland

Riffelalp
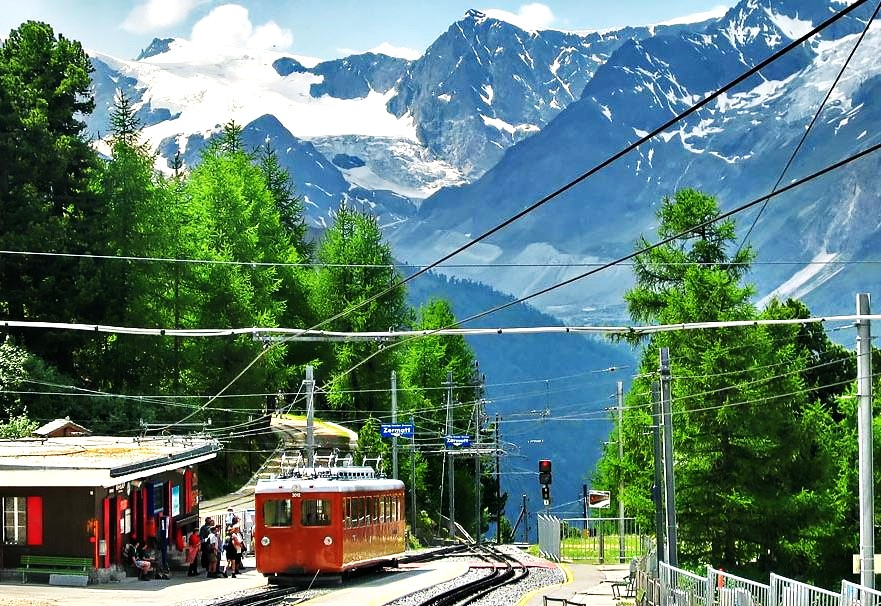

General information
- Location: Zermatt, Valais; Switzerland
- Coordinates: 46°00′N 7°45′E
- Elevation: 2,212 m (7,257 ft)
- Owner: Gornergrat Railway
- Line: Gornergrat railway Riffelalp tram
- Distance: 4.03 km (2.50 mi) from Zermatt GGB
- Platforms: 3 (2 island platform)
- Tracks: 3
- Train operators: Gornergrat Railway

Other information
- Station code: 8501691 (RIAL)

Services
Preceding station	Gornergrat Railway	Following station
Riffelberg towards Gornergrat	Gornergrat–Zermatt	Findelbach towards Zermatt GGB
Location

Riffelalp is a railway station on the Gornergrat railway, a rack railway which links the resort of Zermatt with the summit of the Gornergrat. The station is situated west of the Gornergrat, in the Swiss municipality of Zermatt and canton of Valais, at an altitude of 2,211 m (7,254 ft) above mean sea level.

The station is linked to the five-star Riffelalp Resort by the 625 metres (2,051 ft) long Riffelalp tram, making Riffelalp the highest location in Europe where two distinct railways meet.

== Services ==
As of the December 2023 timetable change, the following services stop at Riffelalp:

- Service every 24 minutes between Gornergrat and Zermatt GGB.
- Service every 24 minutes to Riffelalp, Hotel.

== Gallery ==
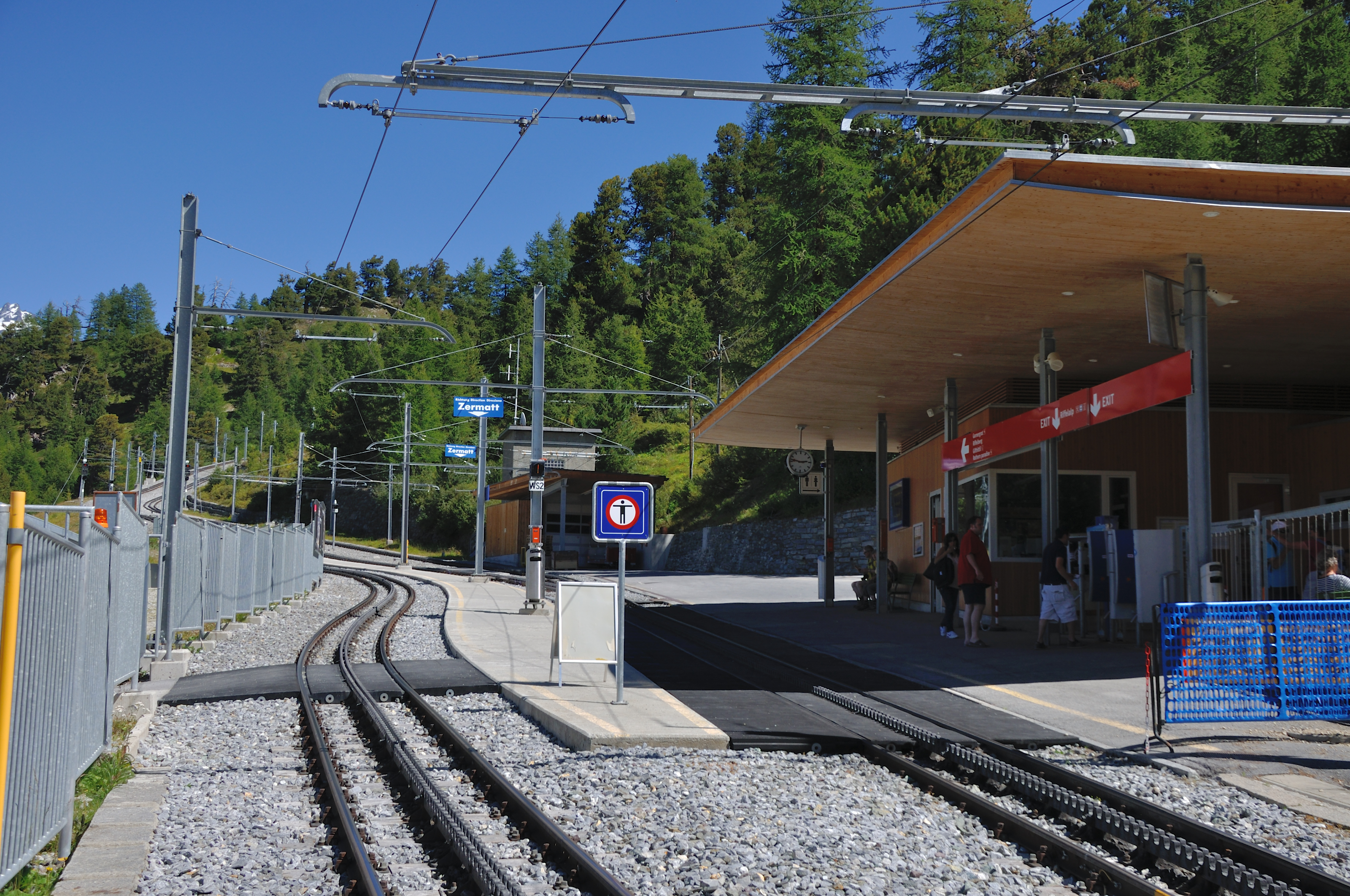
The station looking up the Gornergrat railway

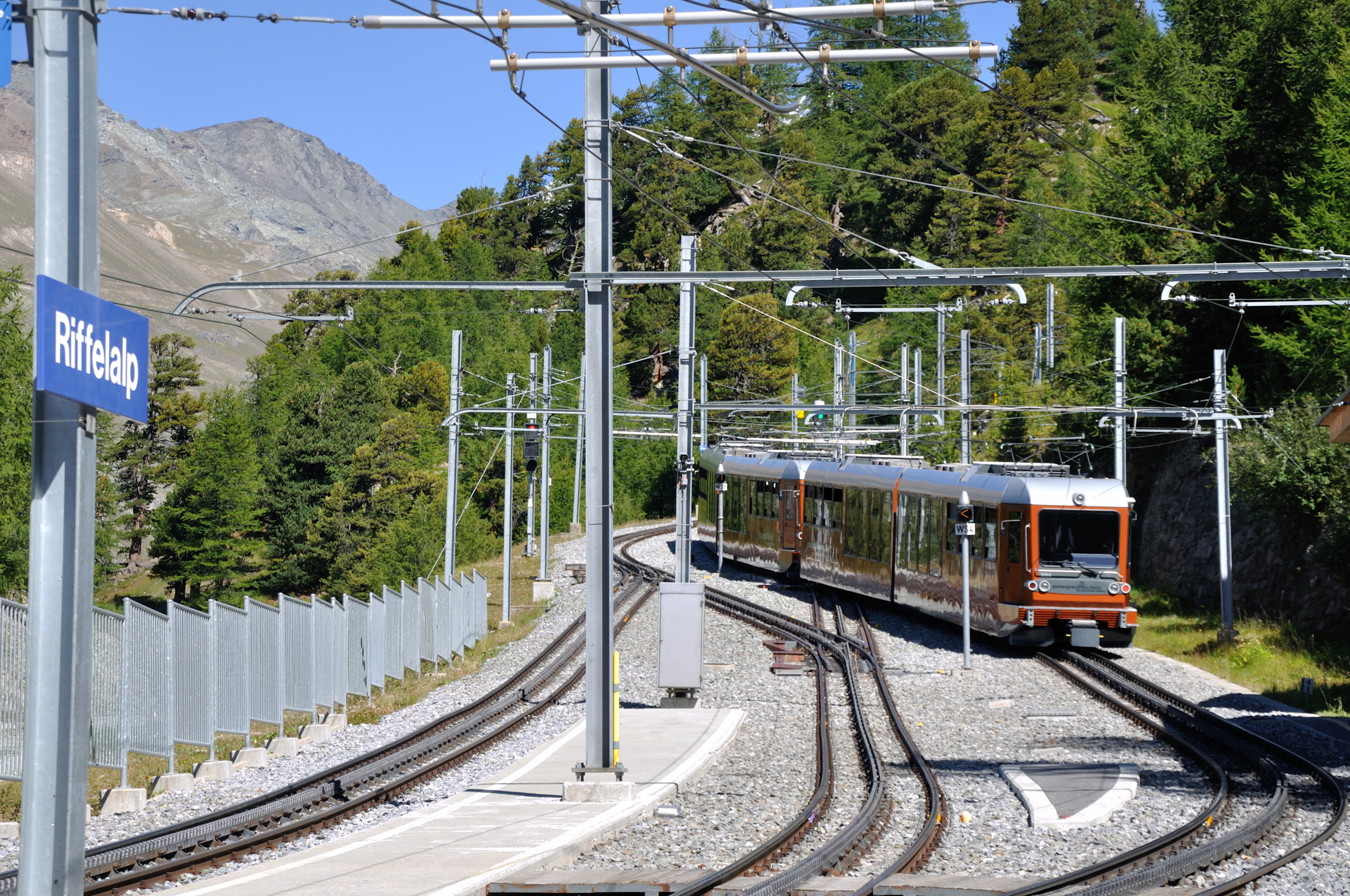
A Gornergrat bound train leaving the station

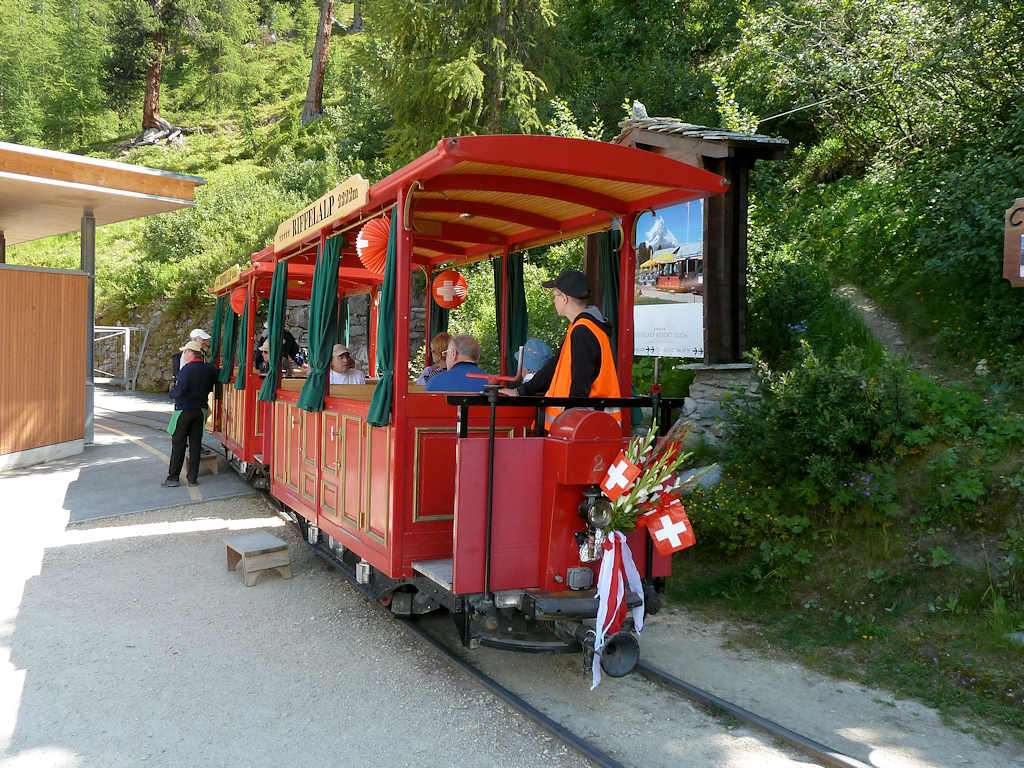
The Riffelalp tram at the station

== See also ==
- List of highest railway stations in Switzerland
