= Riffelberg railway station =

Railway station in Zermatt, Switzerland

Riffelberg
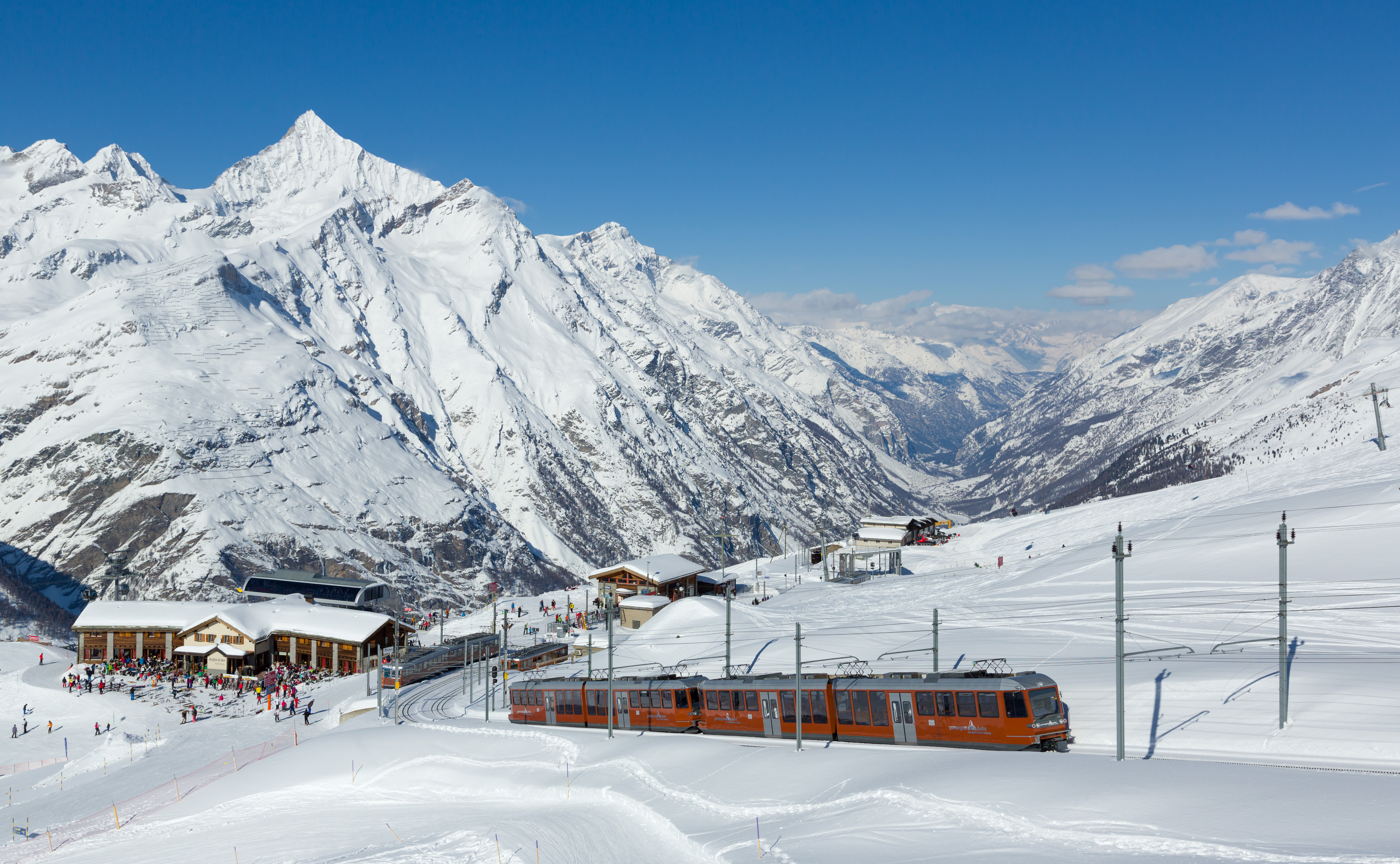

General information
- Location: Zermatt, Valais; Switzerland
- Coordinates: 45°59′35″N 7°45′18″E
- Elevation: 2,583 m (8,474 ft)
- Owner: Gornergrat Railway
- Line: Gornergrat line
- Distance: 6.47 km (4.02 mi) from Zermatt GGB
- Platforms: 2
- Tracks: 3
- Train operators: Gornergrat Railway
- Connections: Ski resort

Other information
- Station code: 8501692 (RIBE)

Services
Preceding station	Gornergrat Railway	Following station
Rotenboden towards Gornergrat	Gornergrat–Zermatt	Riffelalp towards Zermatt GGB
Location

Riffelberg is a railway station on the Gornergrat railway, a rack railway which links the resort of Zermatt with the summit of the Gornergrat. The station is situated west of the Gornergrat, in the Swiss municipality of Zermatt and canton of Valais, at an altitude of 2,582 m (8,471 ft) above mean sea level. It is the third highest station on the line and, considering only open-air railway stations, the third highest in Switzerland and Europe as well.

The Hotel Riffelberg is located at the station.

== Services ==
As of the December 2023 timetable change, the following services stop at Riffelberg:

- Service every 24 minutes between Gornergrat and Zermatt GGB.

== Gallery ==
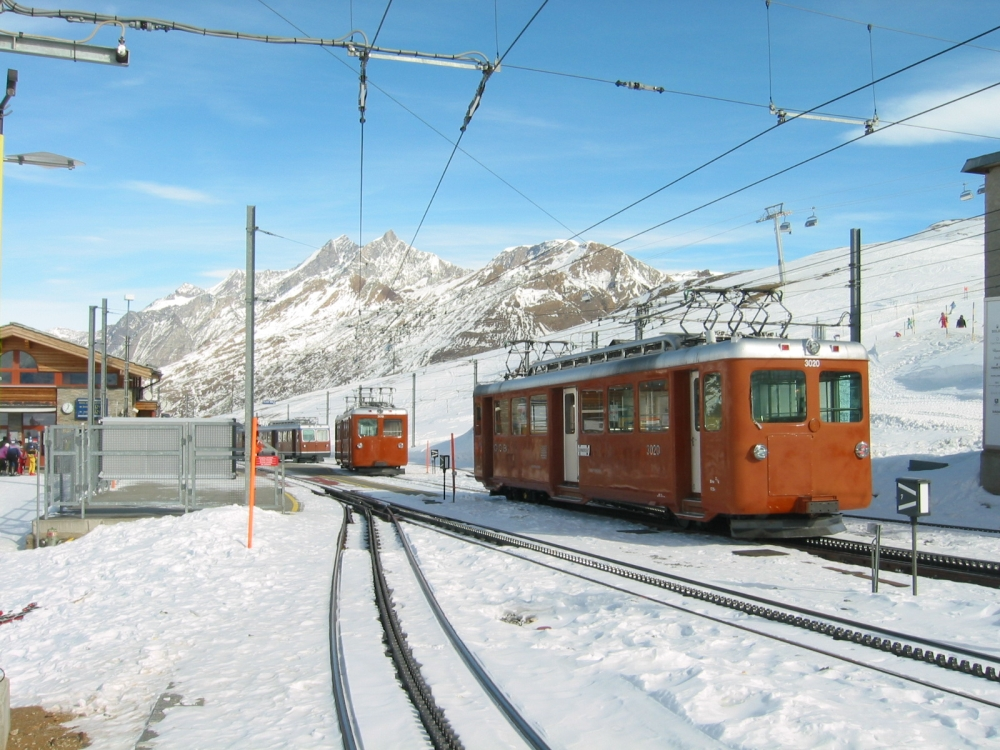
The station platforms

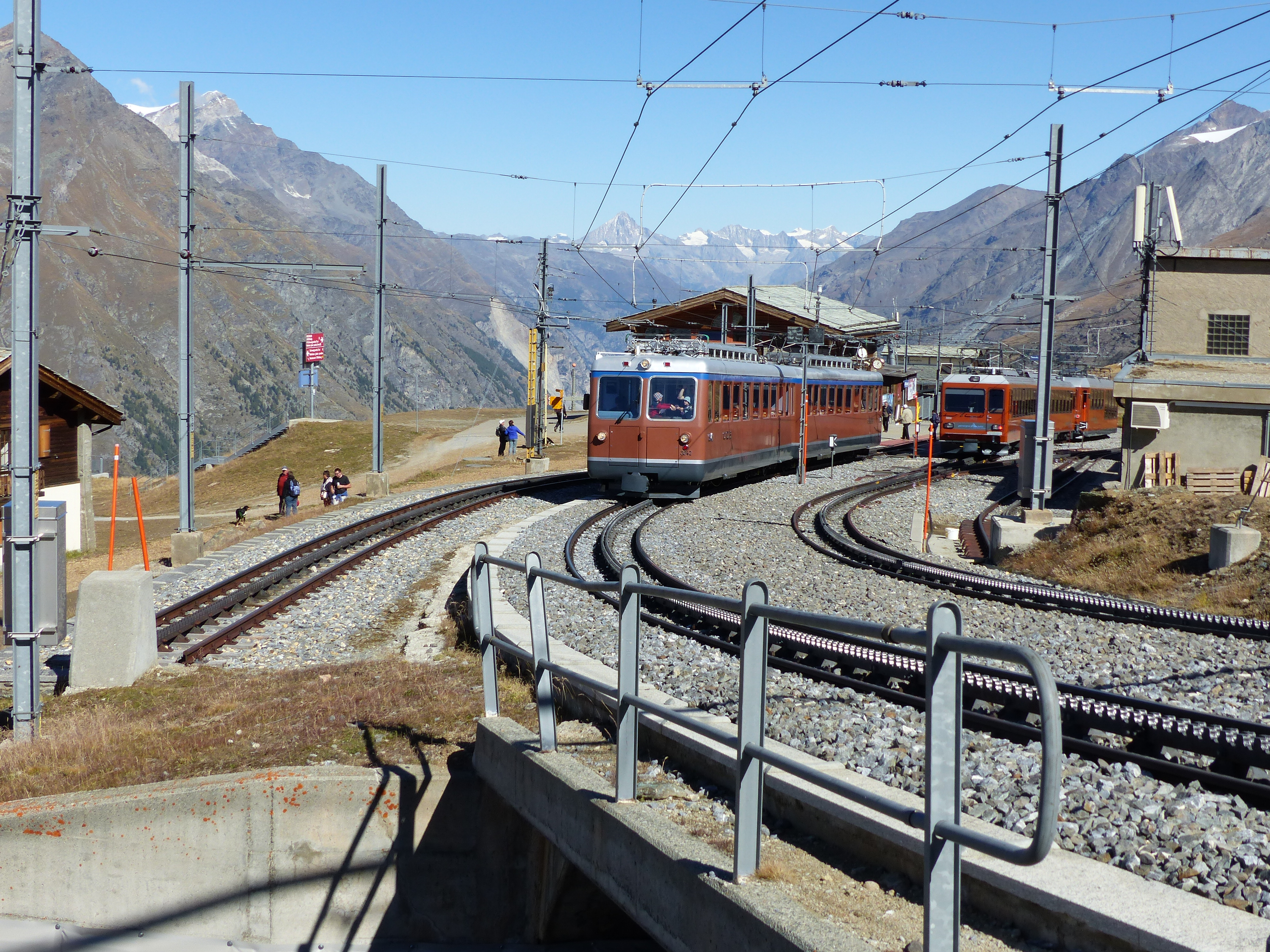
Two trains in Riffelberg station

== See also ==
- List of highest railway stations in Switzerland
