= Riffelalp tram =

Tramway line in Valais, Switzerland

Coordinates: 46°0′7.14″N 7°45′3.37″E

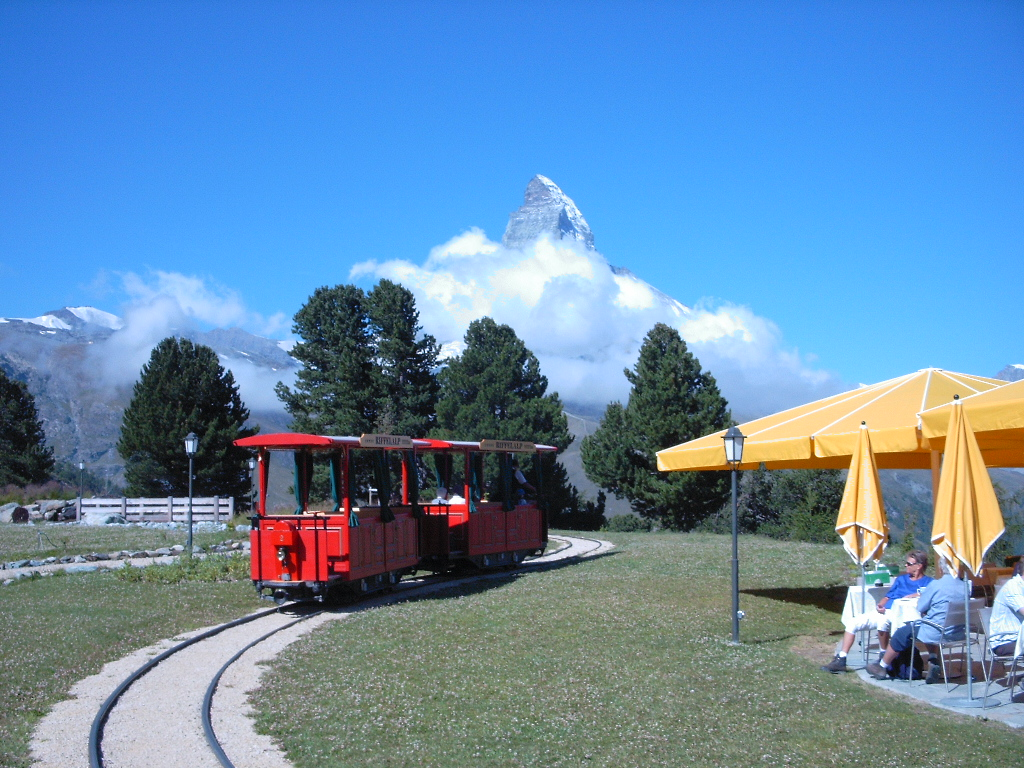
- The tram at Riffelhalp Resort station on the loop. In background is the Matterhorn

Overview
- Owner: Riffelalptram (RiT)
- Locale: Zermatt, Switzerland
- Termini: Riffelalp; Riffelalp Resort
- Stations: 2

Service
- Type: Tramway, Mountain railway

History
- Opened: 13 July 1899
- Closed: 30 September 1960
- Reopened: 15 June 2001

Technical
- Line length: 675.31 m (0.420 mi)
- Number of tracks: Single track
- Track gauge: 800 mm (2 ft 7 1/2 in)
- Electrification: 550 V / 40 Hz, 3-phase (until 1961); 80 V / 400 Ah (since 2001)
- Highest elevation: 2,222 m (7,290.0 ft)
- Maximum incline: 5%
Route map
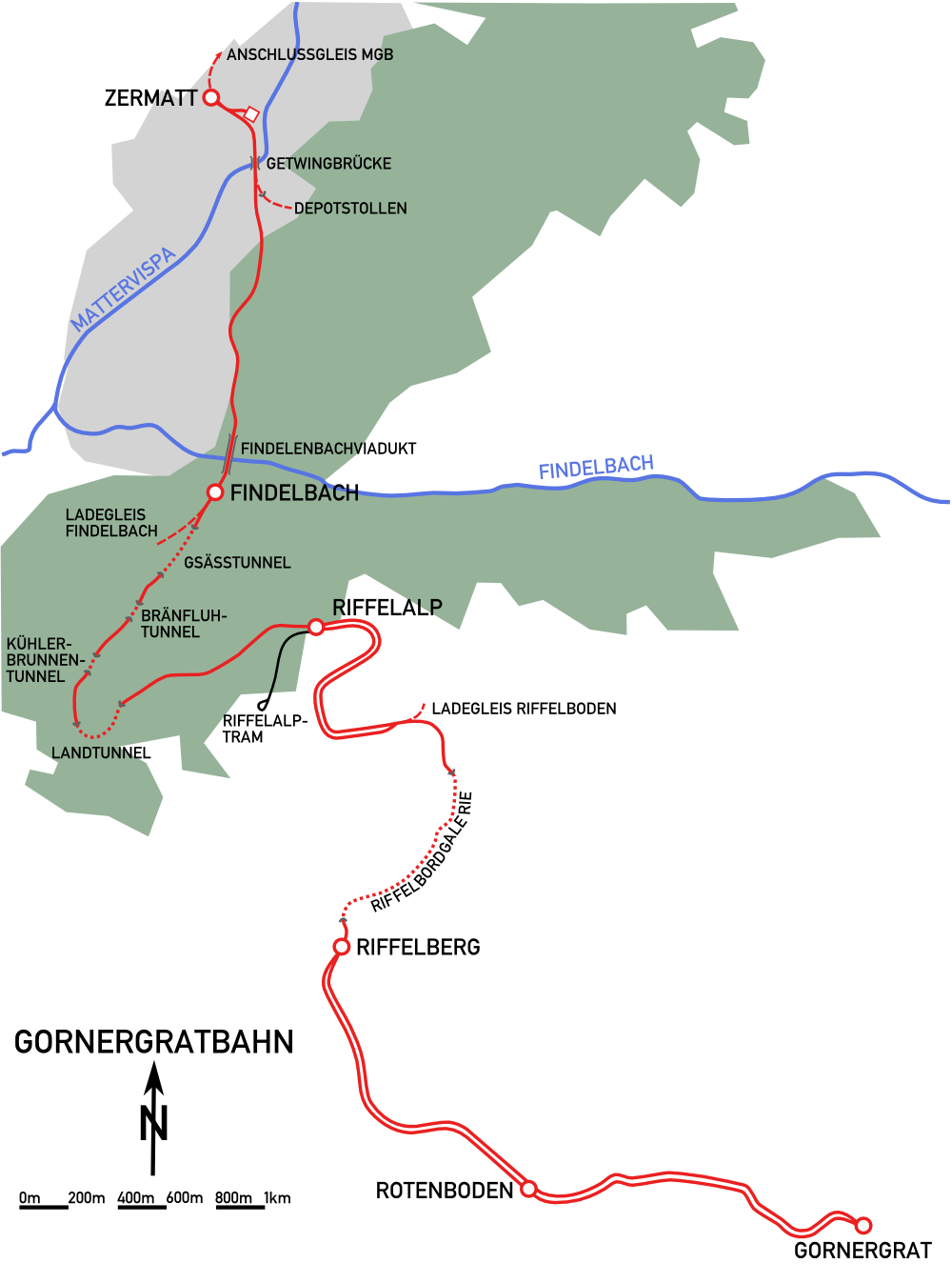

The Riffelalp tram (German: Riffelalptram, RiT) is a high altitude tramway line located in the Swiss canton of Valais near the resort of Zermatt. The line links the Riffelalp Resort to Riffelalp station, on the Gornergrat railway, and via that line to Zermatt and beyond.

The Riffelalp tram is the highest tram line in Europe.

== History ==
The Riffelalp Grand Hotel, the predecessor of today's Riffelalp Resort, was opened by Alexander Seiler in 1884. In 1898, the Gornergrat railway was opened, linking Zermatt to the summit of the Gornergrat. The line included a station called Riffelalp, but this was situated some distance from the resort.

In order to provide better access to the station, the hotel built the Riffelalp tram. The line opened on 13 July 1899, one year after the opening of the Gornergrat railway. The original track was 480 metres (1,570 ft) long and electrified, using a twin overhead line carrying a three-phase ac supply at 550 volts. The tram operated in the summer months only.

During the night of 14 February 1961, the Riffelalp Grand Hotel was destroyed in a fire. The original tram vehicles survived the fire, but without traffic from the hotel, tram service was suspended, it had last run on September 30, 1960. The vehicles were taken to Zermatt for storage, and the line remained closed for the next 40 years.

In 1998, work started on the construction of the new Riffelalp Resort on the site of the old grand hotel. As part of this reconstruction, the tram line was relaid on its original route. The wooden bodies of the original cars had deteriorated in storage, whilst modern safety standards precluded the reintroduction of the original three-phase supply. The original cars were therefore rebuilt with replacement bodies and using battery power. The new line was opened on 15 June 2001.

== Operation ==
The tram line follows the footpath that links the Riffelalp station, at 2,210 m (7,250 ft) above sea level, with the Riffelalp Resort, at 2,222 m (7,290 ft) above sea level. The line has a length of 675 metres (2,215 ft) and comprises a single track of 800 mm gauge (2 ft 7 1/2 in gauge).

At the station end of the line, the tram shares the building of the station and is linked to its cargo ramp. This is the highest station in Europe where two different railways meet, the Riffelalp station itself being one of the highest open-air stations. However, there is no direct connection to the Gornergrat railway, which is of 1,000 mm (3 ft 3 3/8 in) gauge. At the resort end of the line, there is a terminal loop and a depot for the trams, with a battery station.

There are two trams in use, along with a goods trailer. Both trams are powered by a battery (80 V, 400 Ah) and two d.c. motors each delivering 10 kW, and a maximum speed of 10 km/h (6.2 mph). The battery is partially recharged during the electric braking operation.

The service operates during the resort's summer season, which runs from June to September. It is the access route recommended for its guests by the Riffelalp Resort, who provide porter assistance at both Zermatt and Riffelalp stations. During the resort's winter season, from December to April, a snowmobile service is provided in place of the tram.

== Gallery ==
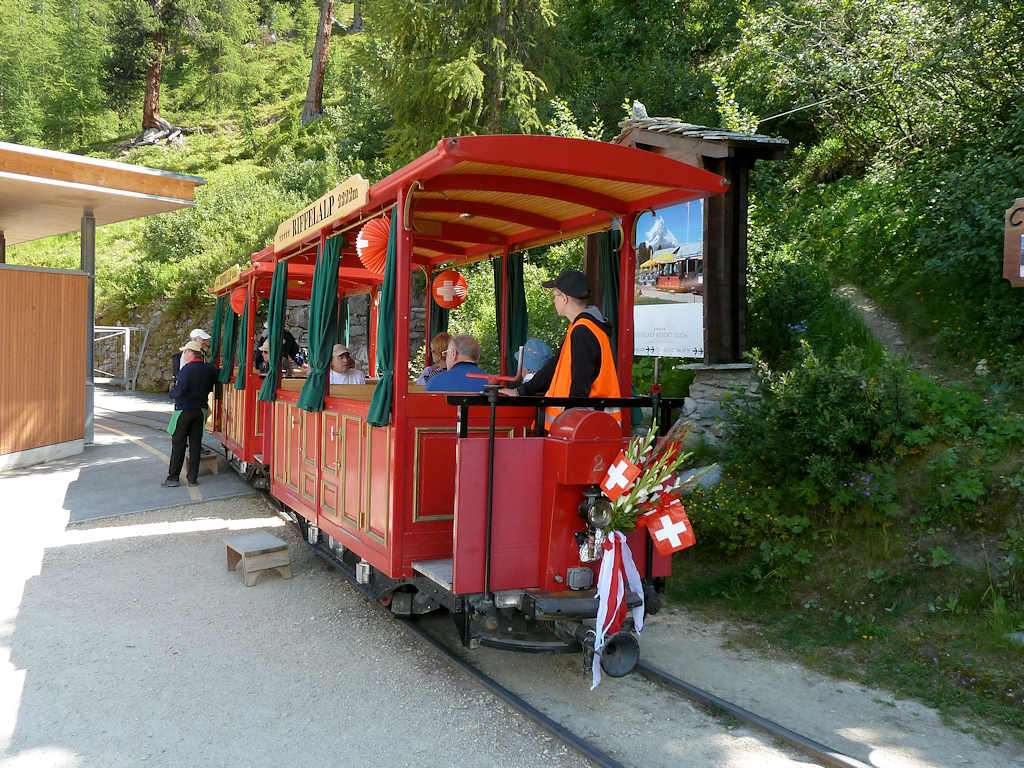
The Riffelalp tram at Riffelalp station on the Gornergrat railway

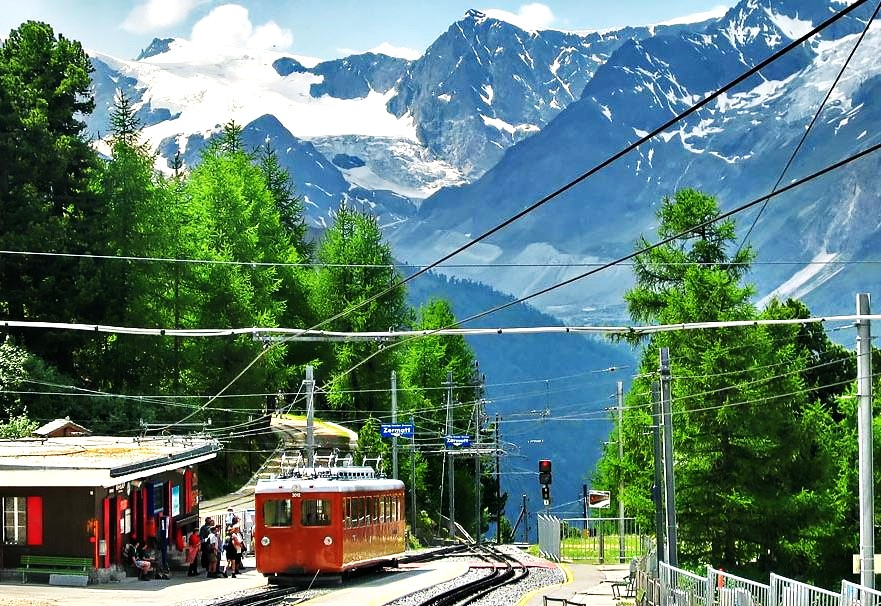
A wider view of the station, with the track of the Riffelalp tram visible beside the station building

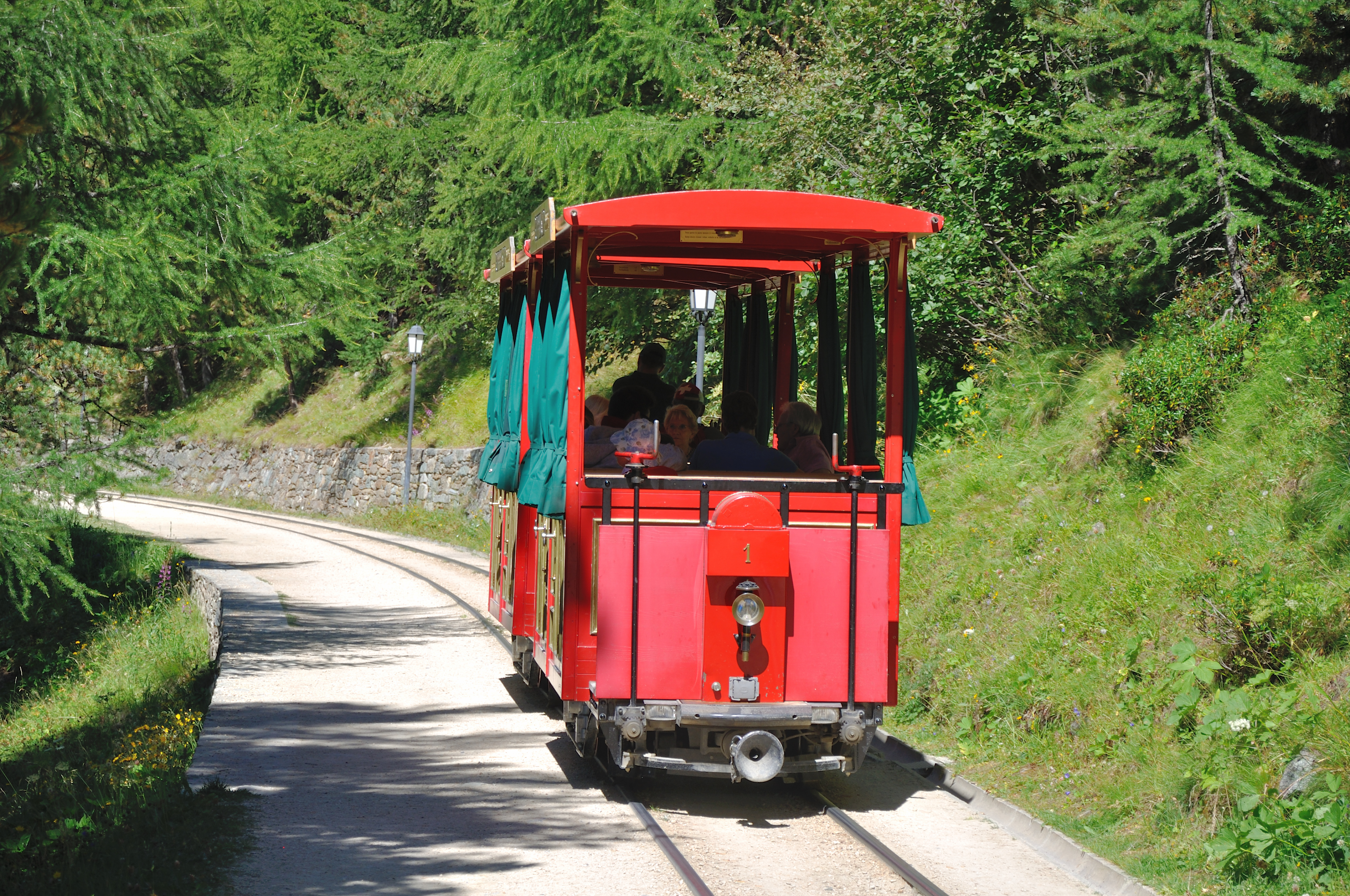
The tram car on the trail between station and hotel

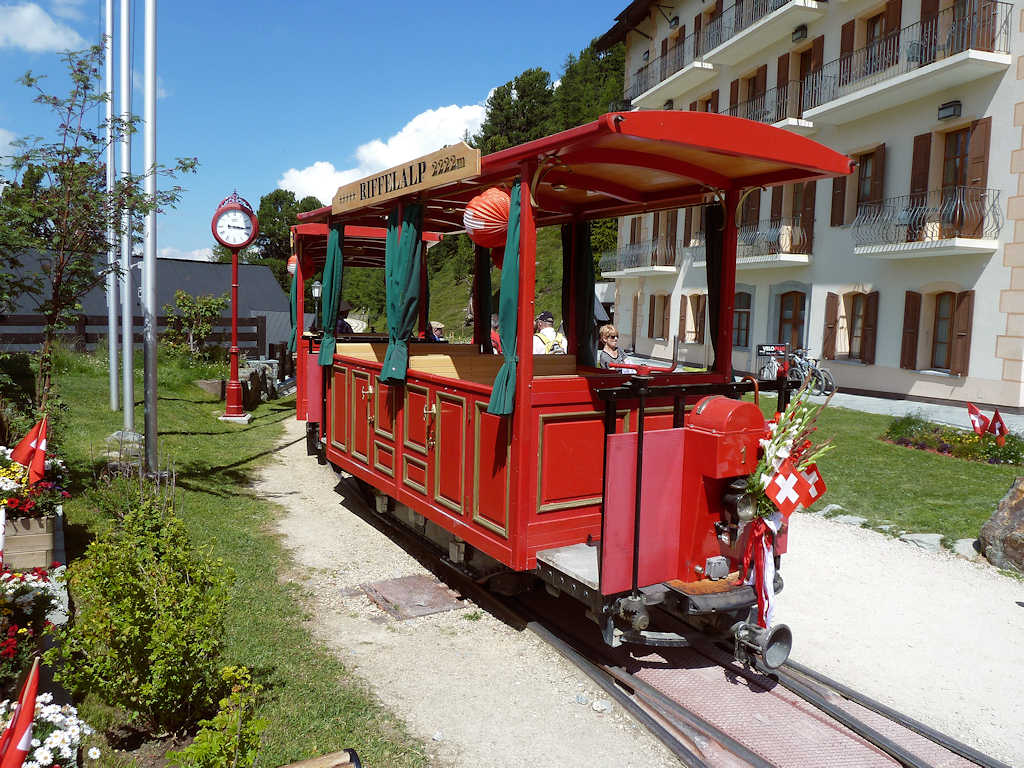
Tram at the Riffelalp Resort

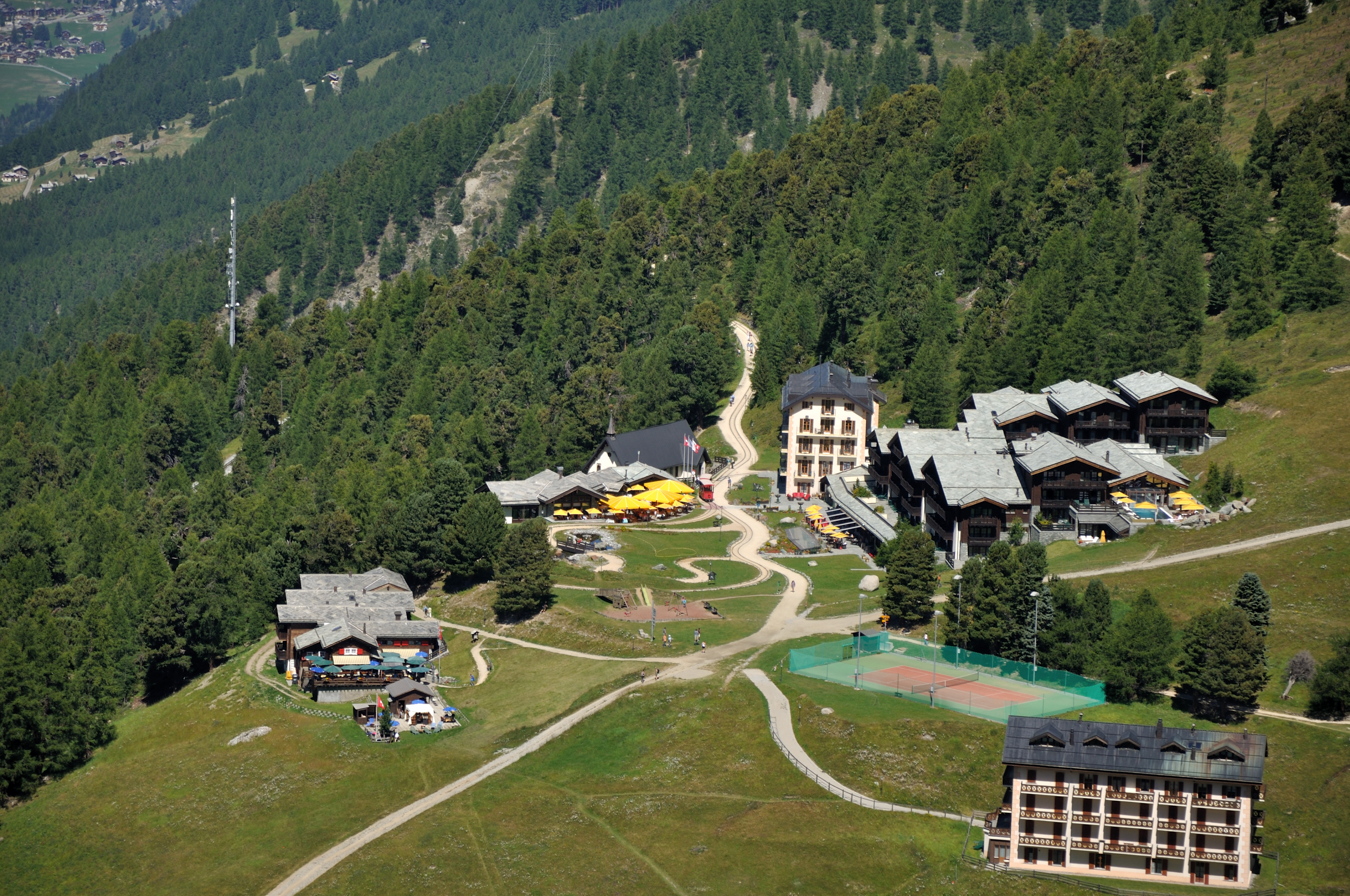
A wider view of the resort, showing the balloon loop, a tramcar, and the route to the station

== Literature ==
- Wolfgang Finke: Die Fahrzeuge der Zermattbahnen in über 1100 Fahrzeugzeichnungen (DVD book). Verlag tram-TV, Cologne 2010 - ISBN 978-3-9813669-0-7
- Florian Inäbnit: Riffelalp-Tram; Einst und jetzt. Prellbock Druck & Verlag, Leissigen 2005 - ISBN 3-907579-34-8
- Florian Inäbnit: Trambahn Mürren, Elektrische Trambahn Riffelalp und Pferdebahn Bellavista. Prellbock Druck & Verlag, Leissigen 1995

== See also ==
- List of heritage railways and funiculars in Switzerland
- 800 mm gauge railways
