= Riffelalp =

- Resort
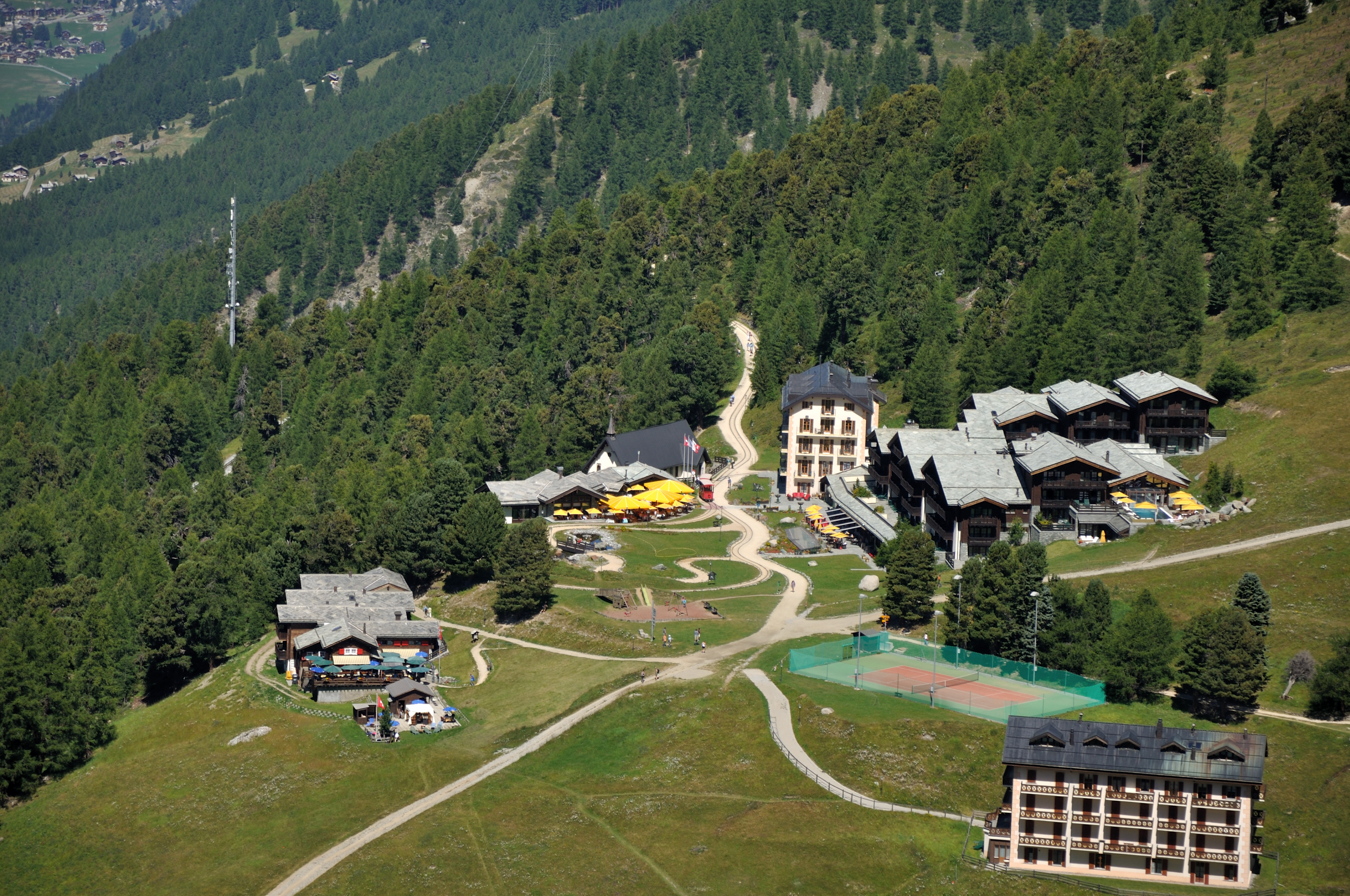
- View of Riffelalp with the tram line in the middle
- Interactive map of Riffelalp
- Coordinates: 46°0′7.14″N 7°45′3.37″E
- Country: Switzerland
- Canton: Valais
- Municipality: Zermatt
- Elevation: 2,222 m (7,290 ft)

Riffelalp is a hamlet in the municipality of Zermatt in the canton of Valais. It is located at a height of 2,222 metres (7,290 ft) above sea level, just above the tree line, approximately halfway between the town of Zermatt and the Gornergrat mountain. Once the site of the prestigious Riffelalp Grand Hotel, today Riffelalp mainly consists of a large hotel complex, the Riffelalp Resort 2222m, and a chapel.

Riffelalp is connected to Zermatt by the Gornergrat railway, although Riffelalp railway station is located some distance from the resort. The 675 metres (2,215 ft) long Riffelalp tram links the two together.

== History ==
The famous Zermatt hotelier Alexander Seiler first spotted the potential of the Riffelalp meadow, with its view of the Matterhorn, in 1856, when he purchased his first parcel of land there. It wasn't, however, until 1878 that construction of the Riffelalp Grand Hotel got underway, and the hotel opened in 1884. In 1898, the Gornergrat railway was opened, and the following year the hotel built the Riffelalp tram to connect it to the railway. Around this time, the capacity of the hotel reached 280 rooms, with the opening of two annex buildings.

During the night of 14 February 1961, the Riffelalp Grand Hotel was destroyed in a fire. In 1986 work commenced on the refurbishment of the two annex, which had survived the fire, and 1988 the Riffelalp was again open to visitors. In 1998, work started on the construction of the new Riffelalp Resort on the site of the old grand hotel.

== See also ==
- List of hotels in Switzerland
- Tourism in Switzerland
