= Rotenboden railway station =

Railway station in Zermatt, Switzerland

Rotenboden
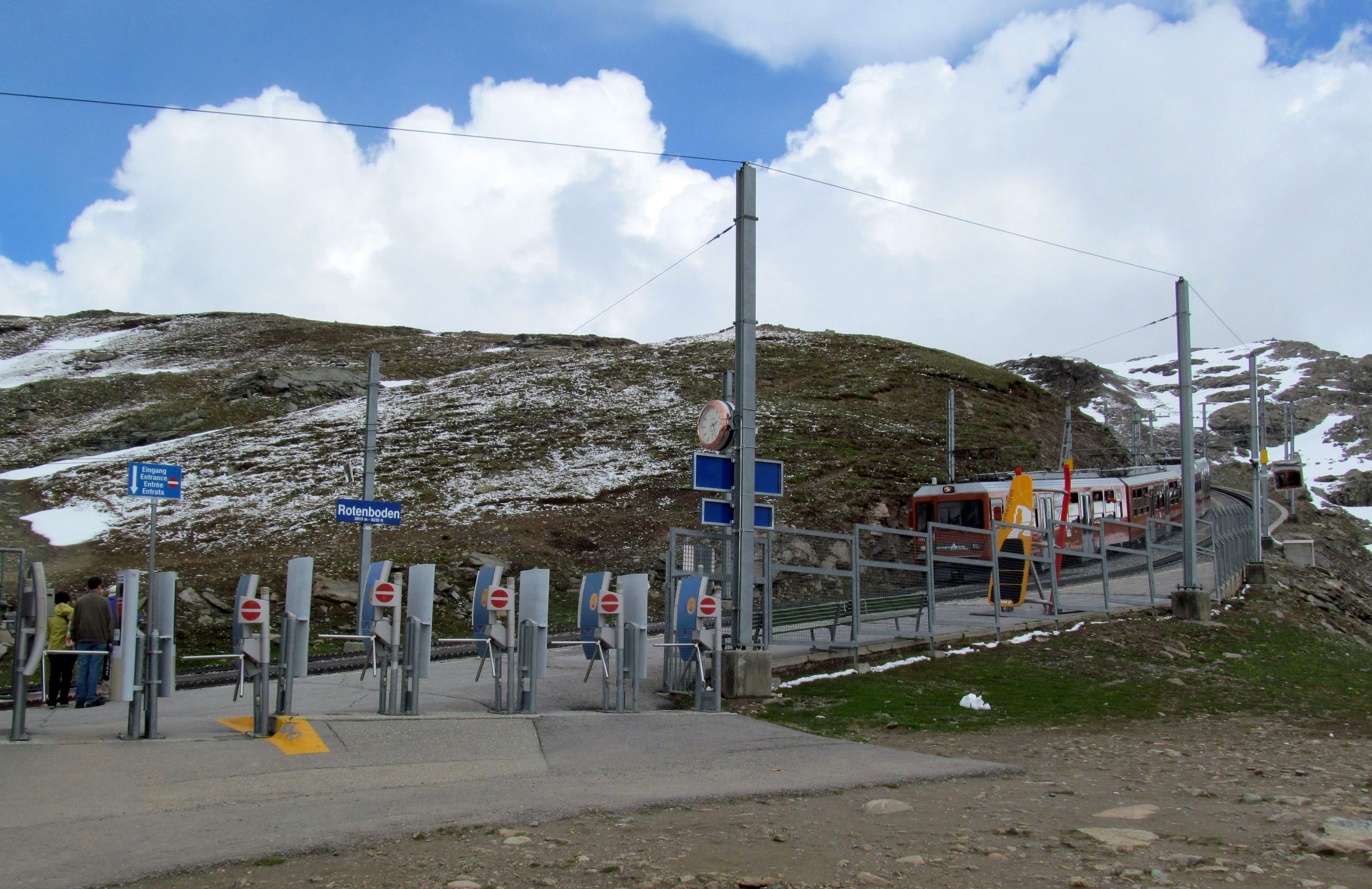

General information
- Location: Zermatt, Valais; Switzerland
- Coordinates: 45°59′04″N 7°45′55″E
- Elevation: 2,815 m (9,236 ft)
- Owner: Gornergrat Railway
- Line: Gornergrat line
- Distance: 7.91 km (4.92 mi) from Zermatt GGB
- Platforms: 2
- Tracks: 2
- Train operators: Gornergrat Railway

Other information
- Station code: 8501693 (ROBO)

History
- Opened: 20 August 1898

Services
Preceding station	Gornergrat Railway	Following station
Gornergrat Terminus	Gornergrat–Zermatt	Riffelberg towards Zermatt GGB
Location

Rotenboden is a railway station on the Gornergrat railway, a rack railway which links the resort of Zermatt with the summit of the Gornergrat. The station is situated west of the Gornergrat, in the Swiss municipality of Zermatt and canton of Valais. At an altitude of 2,815 m (9,236 ft) above mean sea level, it is the second highest open-air railway station in Europe, after the Gornergrat railway station, on the same line.

From the railway station a trail leads to the Monte Rosa Hut, across the Gorner Glacier.

== Services ==
As of the December 2023 timetable change, the following services stop at Rotenboden:

- Service every 24 minutes between Gornergrat and Zermatt GGB.

== See also ==
- List of highest railway stations in Switzerland
