= Gornergrat Railway =

Mountain rack railway, located in the Swiss canton of Valais

Coordinates: 46°01′25″N 7°44′59″E

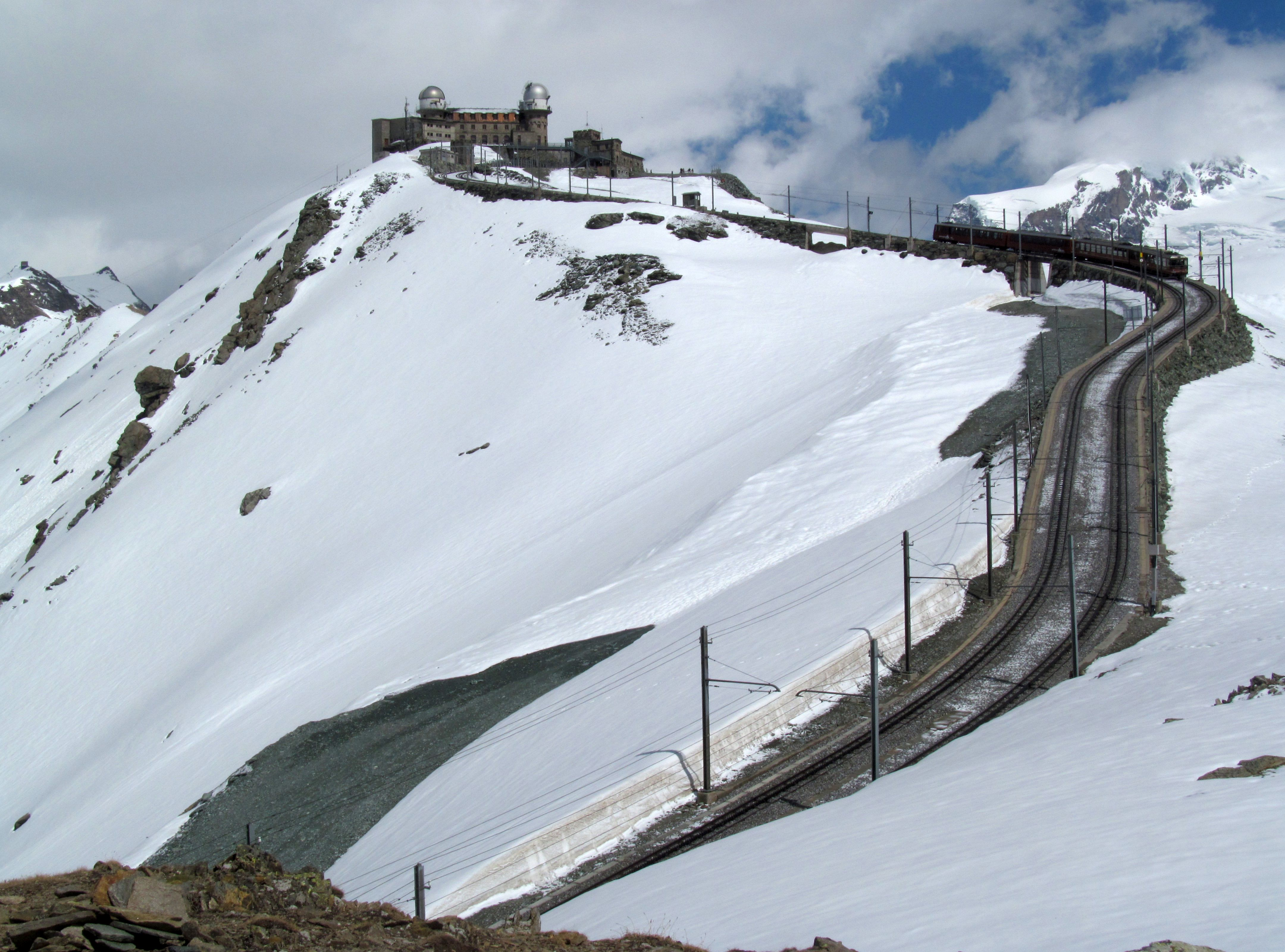
- A train approaching the summit station

Overview
- Native name: Gornergrat Bahn (GGB)
- Owner: BVZ Holding

Technical
- Line length: 9.339 km (5.803 mi)
- Number of tracks: Single track 3.79 km (2.355 mi) Double track
- Rack system: Abt
- Track gauge: 1,000 mm (3 ft 3 3/8 in) metre gauge
- Electrification: 725 V, 50 Hz, 3-phase, 2 Overhead lines
- Highest elevation: 3,089 m (10,135 ft)

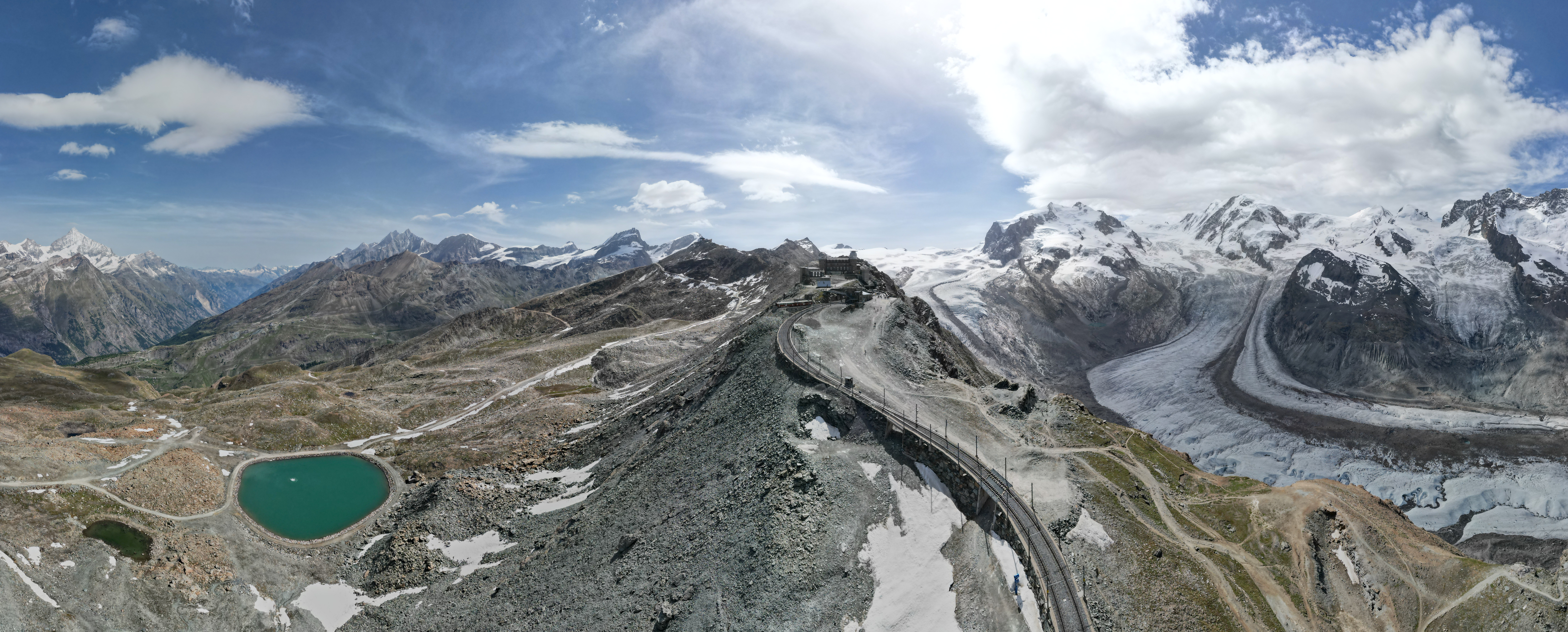
Aerial panorama of the Gornergrat

The Gornergrat Railway (German: Gornergrat Bahn; GGB) is a mountain rack railway, located in the Swiss canton of Valais. It links the resort village of Zermatt, situated at 1,604 m (5,262 ft) above mean sea level, to the summit of the Gornergrat. The Gornergrat railway station is situated at an altitude of 3,089 m (10,135 ft), which makes the Gornergrat Railway the second highest railway in Europe after the Jungfrau, and the highest open-air railway of the continent. The line opened in 1898, and was the first electric rack railway to be built in Switzerland. The Gornergrat is a starting point for many hikes, as it lies surrounded by 29 peaks rising above 4,000 m (13,123 ft) in the Alps and several glaciers, including the Gorner Glacier (which is billed as the second longest glacier in the Alps). At the end of the line on Gornergrat, the Matterhorn is visible on a clear day. It is also a popular skiing area.

The Gornergrat Railway Ltd (Gornergrat Bahn AG) is a wholly owned subsidiary of BVZ Holdings AG, who are also the majority owners of the Matterhorn Gotthard Verkehrs AG, the company that operates the Matterhorn Gotthard Bahn (MGB), with which the GGB connects in Zermatt.

== History ==
Work on the railway started in 1896, five years after the Visp-Zermatt-Bahn had linked Zermatt to Visp and the Rhone Valley. The line opened on August 20, 1898, and was electrified from the start. Initially it operated only in summer, but year-round operation was extended to the lower section of the line in 1929, and to the summit in 1941. The Gornegrat Railway was the highest railway in Europe until the opening of the Jungfrau Railway in 1912.

The upper terminal was remodelled in 2004.

== Operation ==
=== Route ===
There are several passenger stops on the line:

Station	Distance	Height (AMSL)	Notes
Zermatt GGB	0.00	1,605 m (5,266 ft)	Link to Matterhorn Gotthard Bahn and the Zermatt–Sunnegga funicular
Findelbach	1.75 km (1.09 mi)	1,770 m (5,810 ft)	
Riffelalp	4.03 km (2.50 mi)	2,211 m (7,254 ft)	Link to the Riffelalp tram, providing connection to Riffelalp Resort
Riffelberg	6.47 km (4.02 mi)	2,582 m (8,471 ft)	With a three-star hotel
Rotenboden	7.91 km (4.92 mi)	2,815 m (9,236 ft)	
Gornergrat	9.34 km (5.80 mi)	3,089 m (10,135 ft)	With a three-star hotel and observatory

There are also freight-only stations at Ladegleis Findelbach, which is on a short branch from the passenger station at Findelbach, and at Riffelboden, which is situated between Riffelalp and Riffelberg passenger stations.

=== Infrastructure ===
The line is 9,339 m (30,640 ft) in length, including 3,790 m (12,434 ft) of double track, and traverses an altitude difference of 1,469 m (4,820 ft). It is built to metre gauge (3 ft 3 3/8 in) and uses the Abt rack system throughout. It is one of four lines in the world using three-phase electric power, requiring two overhead conductors, with the track forming the third conductor. There is a non-powered connection with the metre gauge Matterhorn Gotthard Bahn at Zermatt to allow transfer of freight and delivery of rolling stock.

=== Rolling stock ===
The line uses the following rolling stock:

Image	Numbers	Notation	Year	Notes
	3001–3003	He 2/2	1898	Locomotives. Unit 3002 is displayed on a roundabout at Stalden, while 3003 is displayed at the Gornergrat railway station with gold paint as of September 2023.
	3015	Dhe 2/4		Baggage car, rebuilt from sister car to 3019-3022
	3017	Xhe 2/4		Works car, rebuilt from sister car to 3019-3022. Carries re-railing equipment and equipment to apply anti-freeze to the overhead wires.
	3019-3022	Bhe 2/4	1947-61	Single unit railcars, remaining four cars of a once much larger class (3011-3022). Two other members of this class have been rebuilt (3015/3017), the remainder have been scrapped.
	3041-3044	Bhe 4/8	1965-75	Twin unit railcars
	3051-3054	Bhe 4/8	1993	Twin unit railcars
	3061-3062	Bhe 4/4	1981	Multi-purpose railcars, which can operate in passenger service with matching driving trailers Bt 3071-3072, or in freight/works service.
	3081-3084	Bhe 4/6	2006	Low floor two-section articulated railcars, built by Stadler Rail.
	3091-3095	Bhe 4/6	2022	Low floor two-section articulated railcars, built by Stadler Rail, designed by Pininfarina

The railway typically operates two-railcar trains, and can carry approximately 2,500 people per hour from Zermatt to the mountain summit.

== Gallery ==
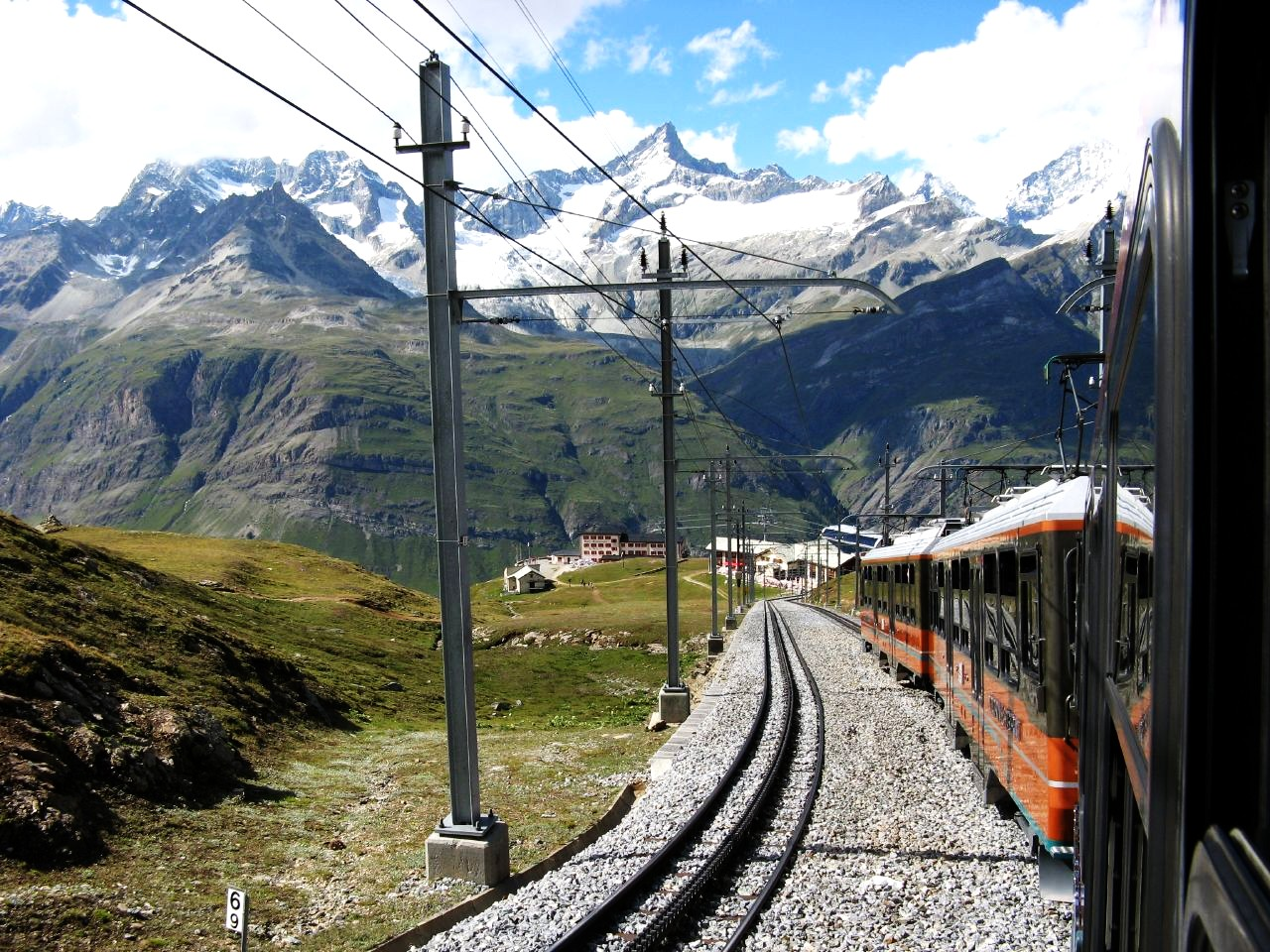
Above Riffelberg

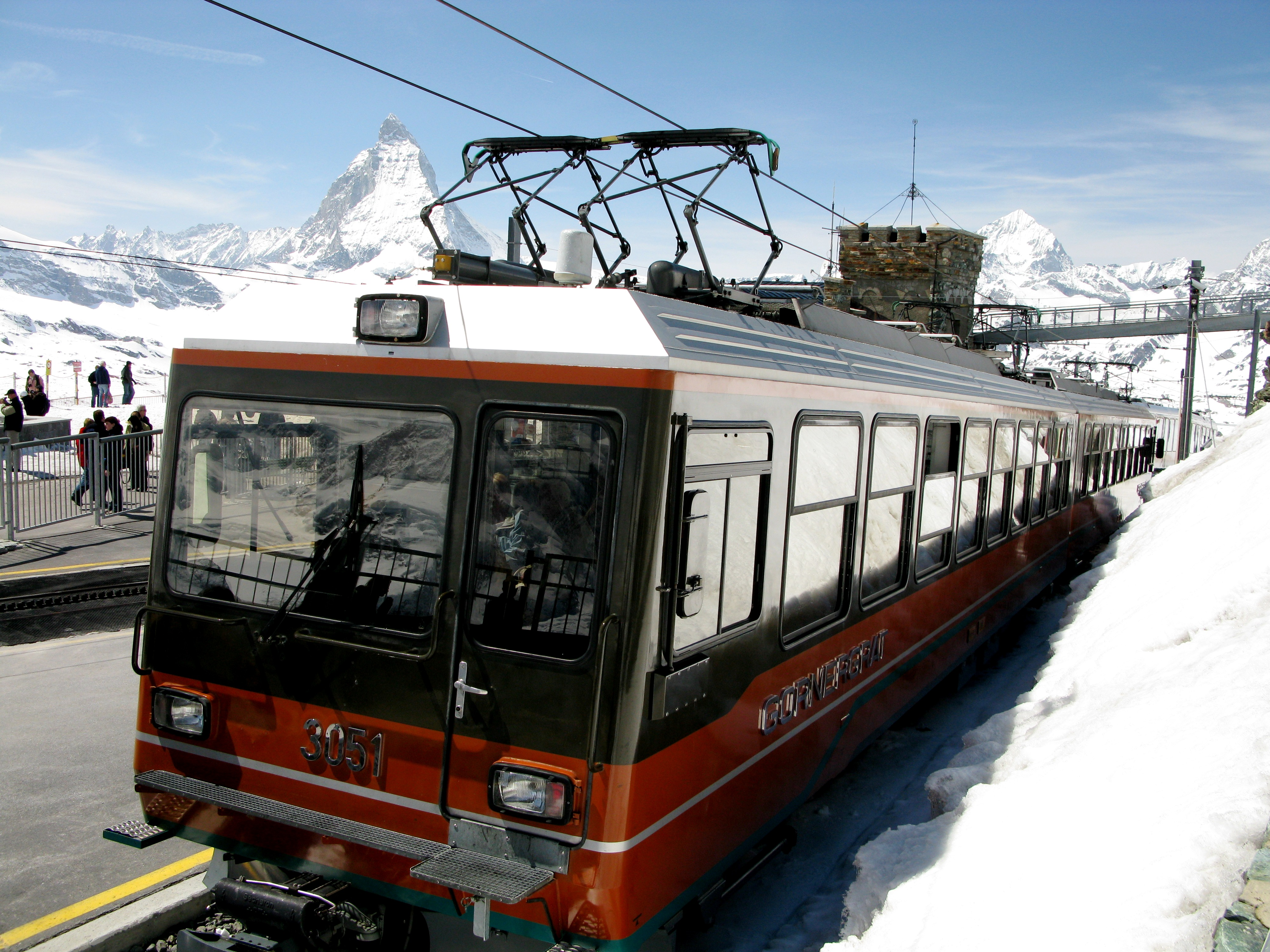
Summit station; the train has two pantographs for the three-phase power-supply

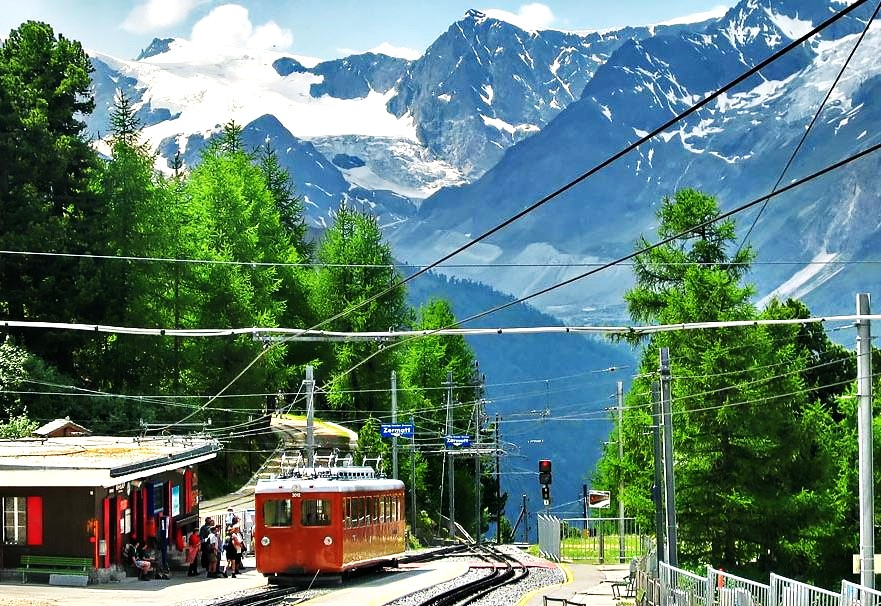
Riffelalp intermediate station. In the left, beside station building, the track of the Riffelalptram

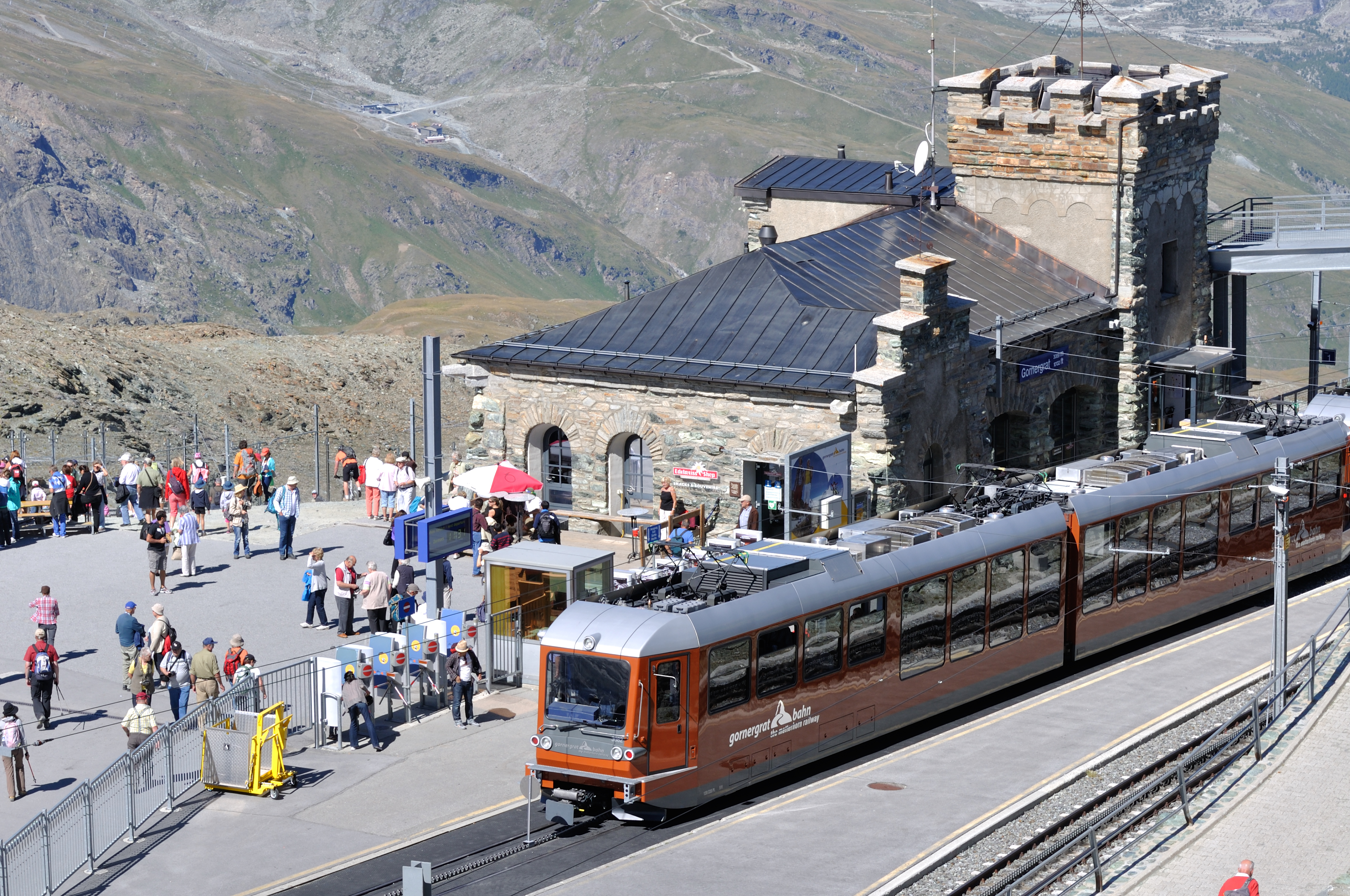
Gornergrat station building

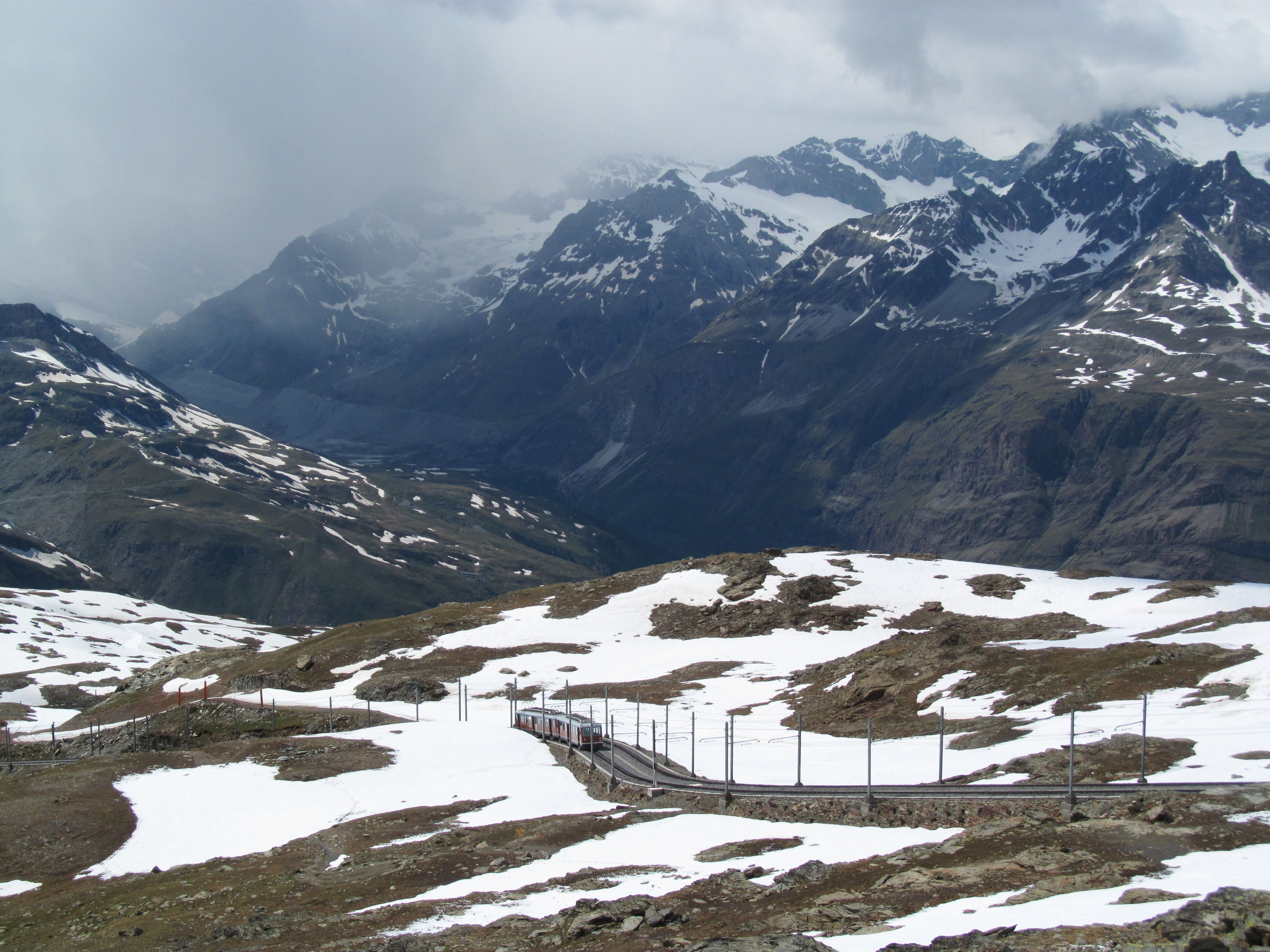
Above Rotenboden

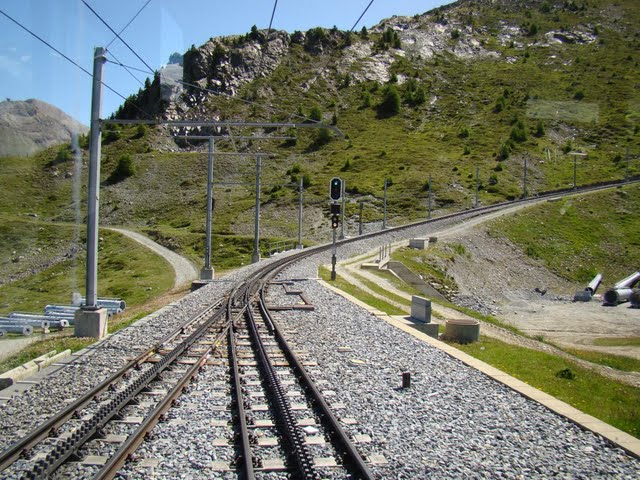
Switch point

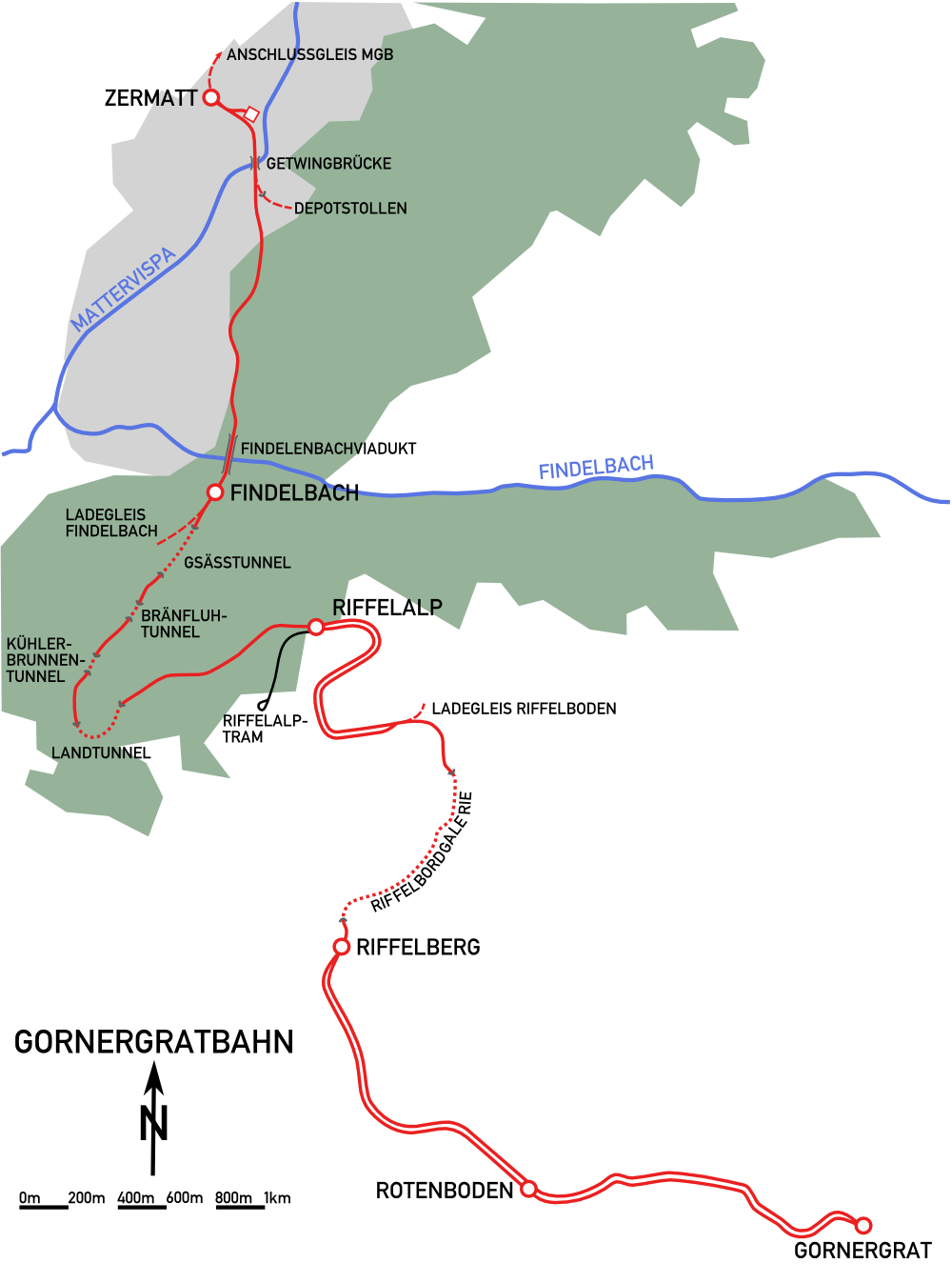
Map of the railway

== See also ==
- List of mountain railways in Switzerland
