= Gornergrat =

Mountain in Switzerland

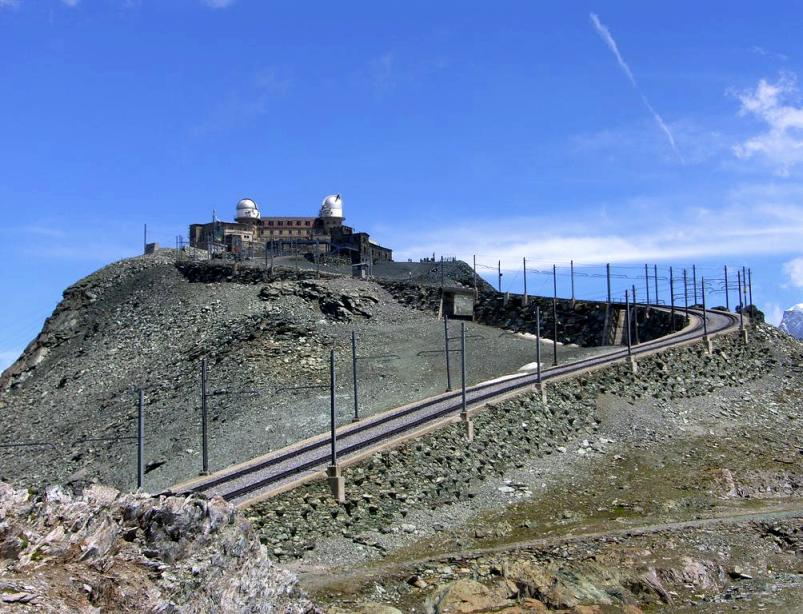
- Summit of Gornergrat with observatory

Highest point
- Peak: unnamed
- Elevation: 3,135 m (10,285 ft)
- Prominence: 50 m (160 ft)
- Parent peak: Monte Rosa
- Coordinates: 45°59′00″N 07°47′05″E

Naming
- English translation: Gorner Ridge
- Language of name: German

Geography
- Location within Switzerland
- Location: Valais
- Country: Switzerland
- Parent range: Pennine Alps
- Topo map: Swiss Federal Office of Topography swisstopo

The Gornergrat (English: Gorner Ridge; 3,135 m (10,285 ft)) is a rocky ridge of the Pennine Alps, overlooking the Gorner Glacier south-east of Zermatt in Switzerland. It can be reached from Zermatt by the Gornergrat rack railway (GGB), the highest open-air railway in Europe. Between the Gornergrat railway station (3,090 m (10,140 ft)) and the summit is the Kulm Hotel (3,120 m (10,240 ft)). In the late 1960s two astronomical observatories were installed in the two towers of the Kulmhotel Gornergrat. The project “Stellarium Gornergrat” is hosted in the Gornergrat South Observatory.

== Overview ==
It is located about three kilometers east of Zermatt in the Swiss canton of Valais. The Gornergrat is located between the Gornergletscher and Findelgletscher and offers panoramic views of 29 mountains above 4,000 m (13,123 ft), whose highest are Dufourspitze (in the large Monte Rosa massif), Liskamm, Matterhorn, Dom and Weisshorn.

This is the last stop of the Gornergrat train, opened in 1898, which climbs almost 1,500 m (4,900 ft) through Riffelalp and Riffelberg. At the terminus on the south-western tip of the ridge is a hotel. The station forms part of the Zermatt ski area. From 1958 to 2007 there was a cable car from Gornergrat over the Hohtälli (3,275 m (10,745 ft)) to the Stockhorn (3,405 m (11,171 ft)) which, until the construction of the Klein Matterhorn cable car, was the highest mountain station in Zermatt. At the west side of the Gorner Ridge, nearby the Rotenboden railway station is the peak Riffelhorn (2,928 m (9,606 ft)).

== Observatory ==
The observatory at the summit of Gornergrat was built on top of the Kulmhotel Gornergrat in the late 1960s and is most notably equipped with a 600 mm telescope built by Officina Stellare. It was the location of the Gornergrat Infrared Telescope (North tower; until 2005) and of KOSMA (South tower; until 2010).

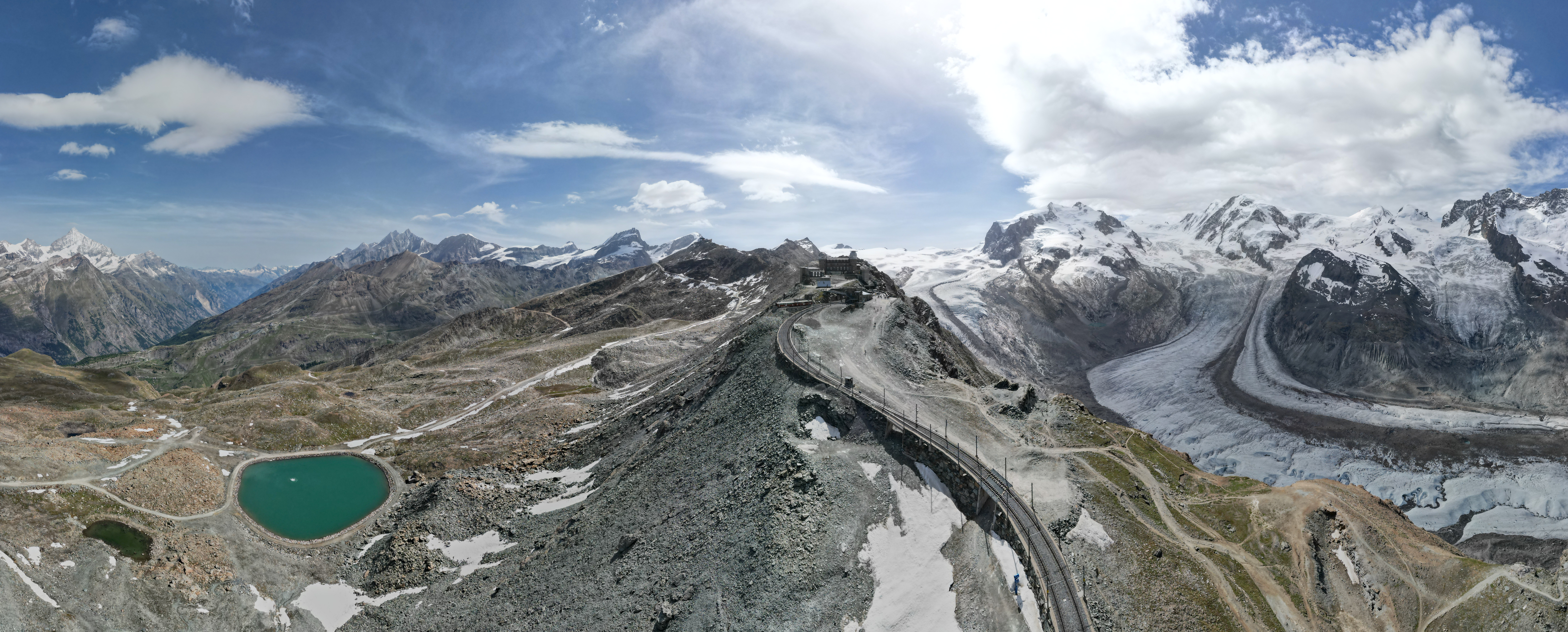
Aerial panorama of the Gornergrat

== See also ==
- Gornergratbahn
- Riffelalptram
- List of mountains of Switzerland accessible by public transport
