= Zermatt GGB railway station =

Railway station in Zermatt, Switzerland

Zermatt GGB
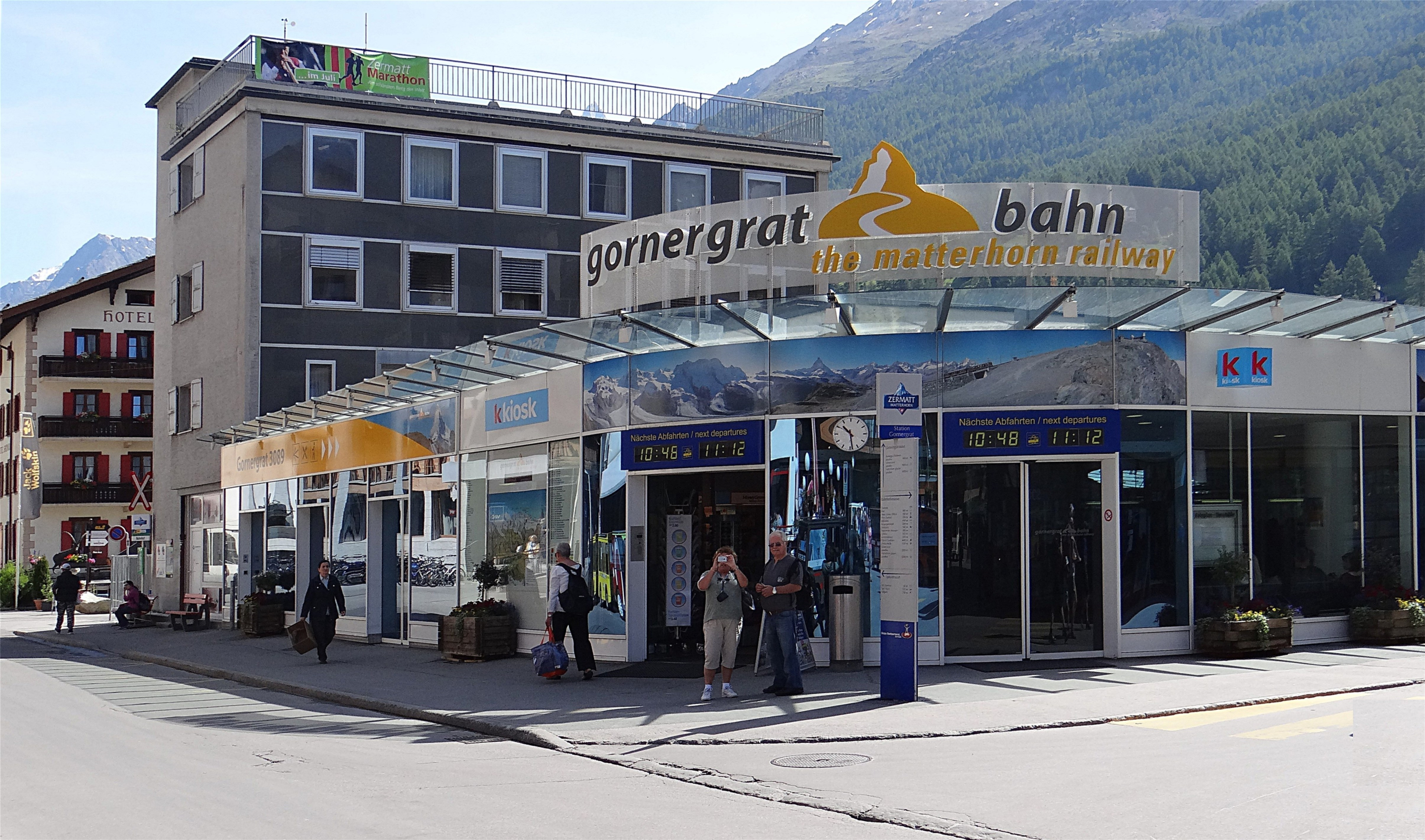
- The station building in 2013

General information
- Location: Zermatt; Switzerland
- Coordinates: 46°01′26″N 7°44′56″E
- Elevation: 1,605 m (5,266 ft)
- Owner: Gornergrat Railway
- Line: Gornergrat line
- Platforms: 1 bay platform
- Tracks: 1
- Train operators: Gornergrat Railway
- Connections: Local electric buses

Other information
- Station code: 8501690 (ZERG)

History
- Electrified: 20 August 1898

Services
Preceding station	Gornergrat Railway	Following station
Findelbach towards Gornergrat	Gornergrat–Zermatt	Terminus
Location

Zermatt GGB railway station (German: Bahnhof Zermatt GGB, French: Gare de Zermatt GGB) is a railway station in the municipality of Zermatt, in the Swiss canton of Valais. It is the northern terminus of 1,000 mm (3 ft 3 3/8 in) metre gauge Gornergrat Railway and is served by local trains only. The station is across the street from Zermatt railway station, the southern terminus of the Matterhorn Gotthard Bahn's Brig–Zermatt line.

== Services ==
As of the December 2023 timetable change, the following services stop at Zermatt GGB:

- Service every 24 minutes to Gornergrat.
