= Gornergrat railway station =

Railway station in Zermatt, Switzerland

Gornergrat
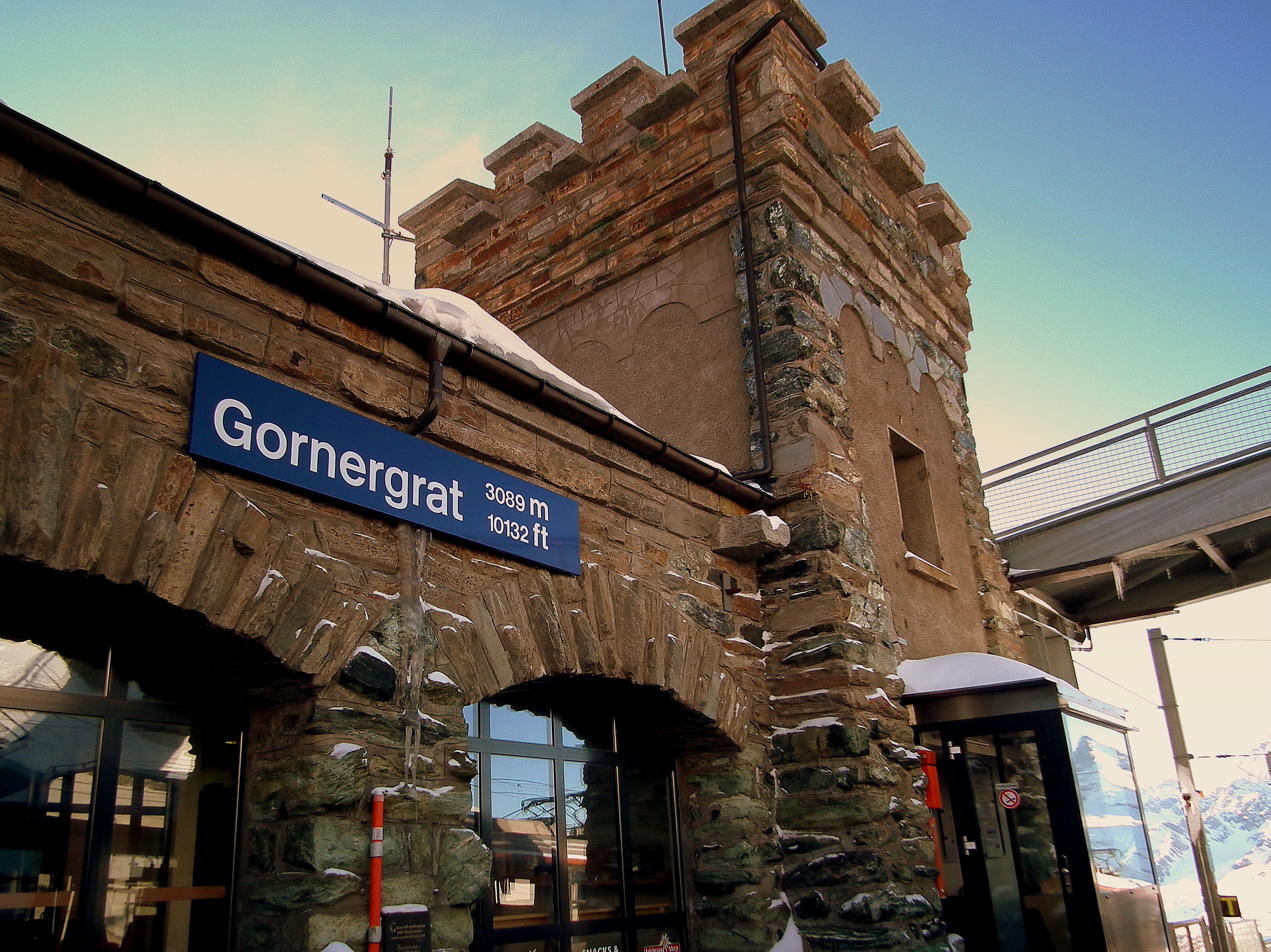

General information
- Location: Gornergrat, Zermatt, Canton of Valais, Switzerland
- Coordinates: 45°59′00″N 7°46′56″E
- Elevation: 3,089 m (10,135 ft)
- Owner: Gornergrat Railway
- Line: Gornergrat line
- Distance: 9.34 km (5.80 mi) from Zermatt GGB
- Platforms: 2
- Tracks: 2
- Train operators: Gornergrat Railway

Other information
- Station code: 8501694 (GOGR)

History
- Opened: 20 August 1898

Services
Preceding station	Gornergrat Railway	Following station
Terminus	Gornergrat–Zermatt	Rotenboden towards Zermatt GGB
Location

Gornergrat is the upper terminal railway station of the Gornergrat railway, a rack railway which links it with the resort of Zermatt. The station is situated at the summit of the Gornergrat, in the Swiss municipality of Zermatt and canton of Valais. At an altitude of 3,089 m (10,135 ft) above mean sea level, it is the highest open-air railway station in Europe.

Near the station is the Kulm Hotel, a hotel and observatory.

== Services ==
As of the December 2023 timetable change, the following services stop at Gornergrat:

- Service every 24 minutes to Zermatt GGB.

== Gallery ==
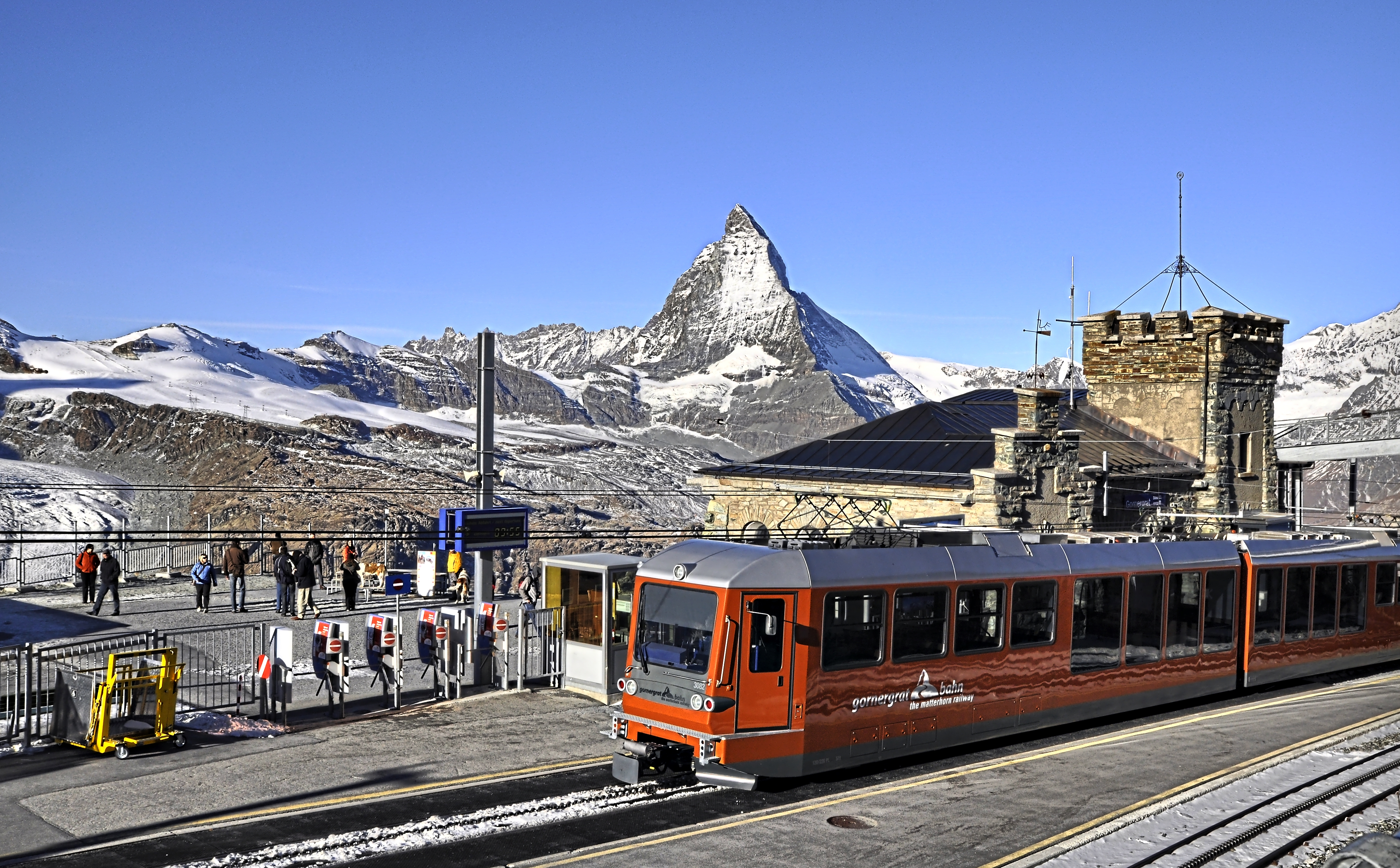
The station with the Matterhorn behind

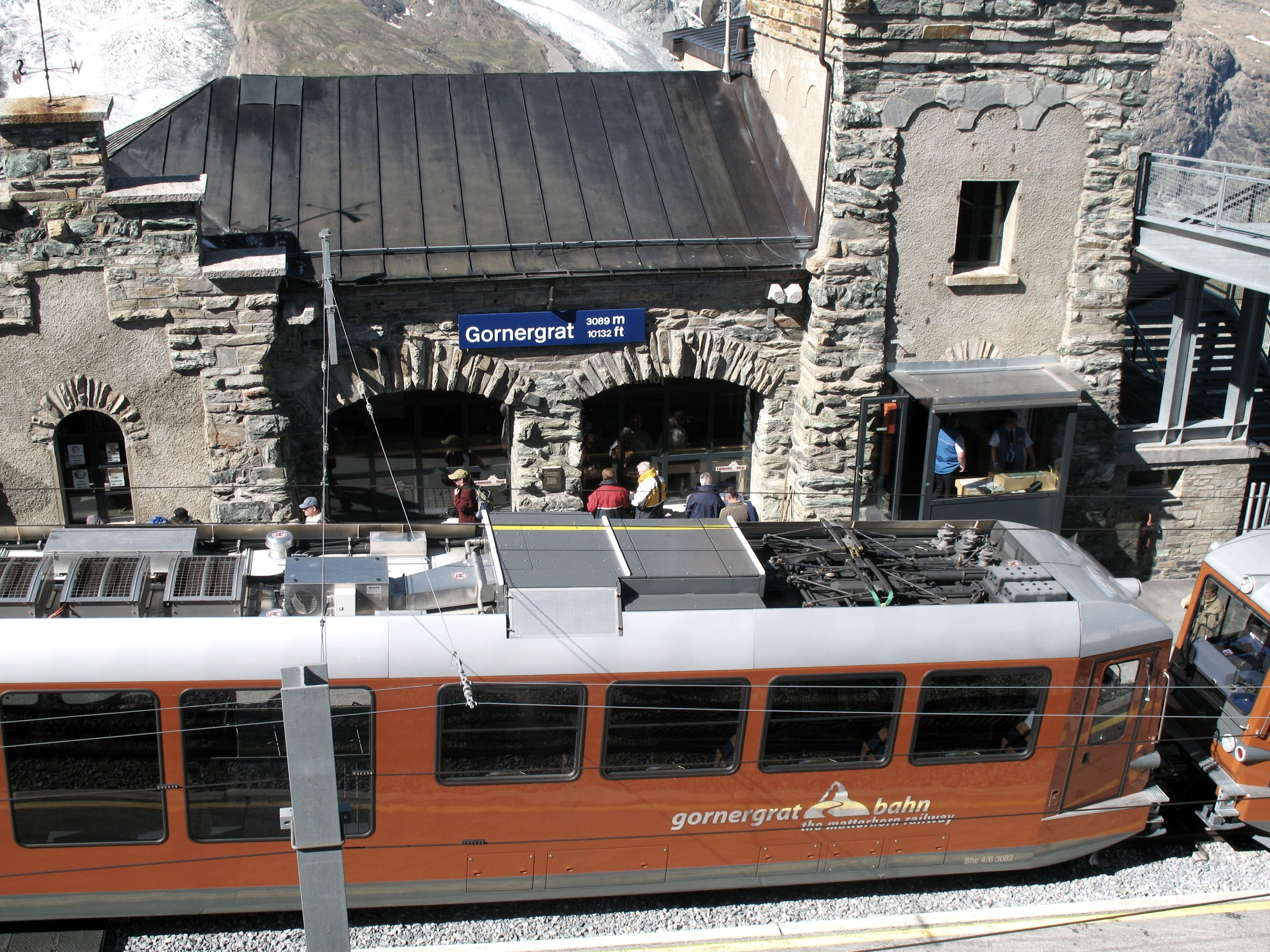
Train at the platform

== See also ==
- List of highest railway stations in Switzerland
- List of buildings and structures above 3000 m in Switzerland
