= List of highest railways in Europe =

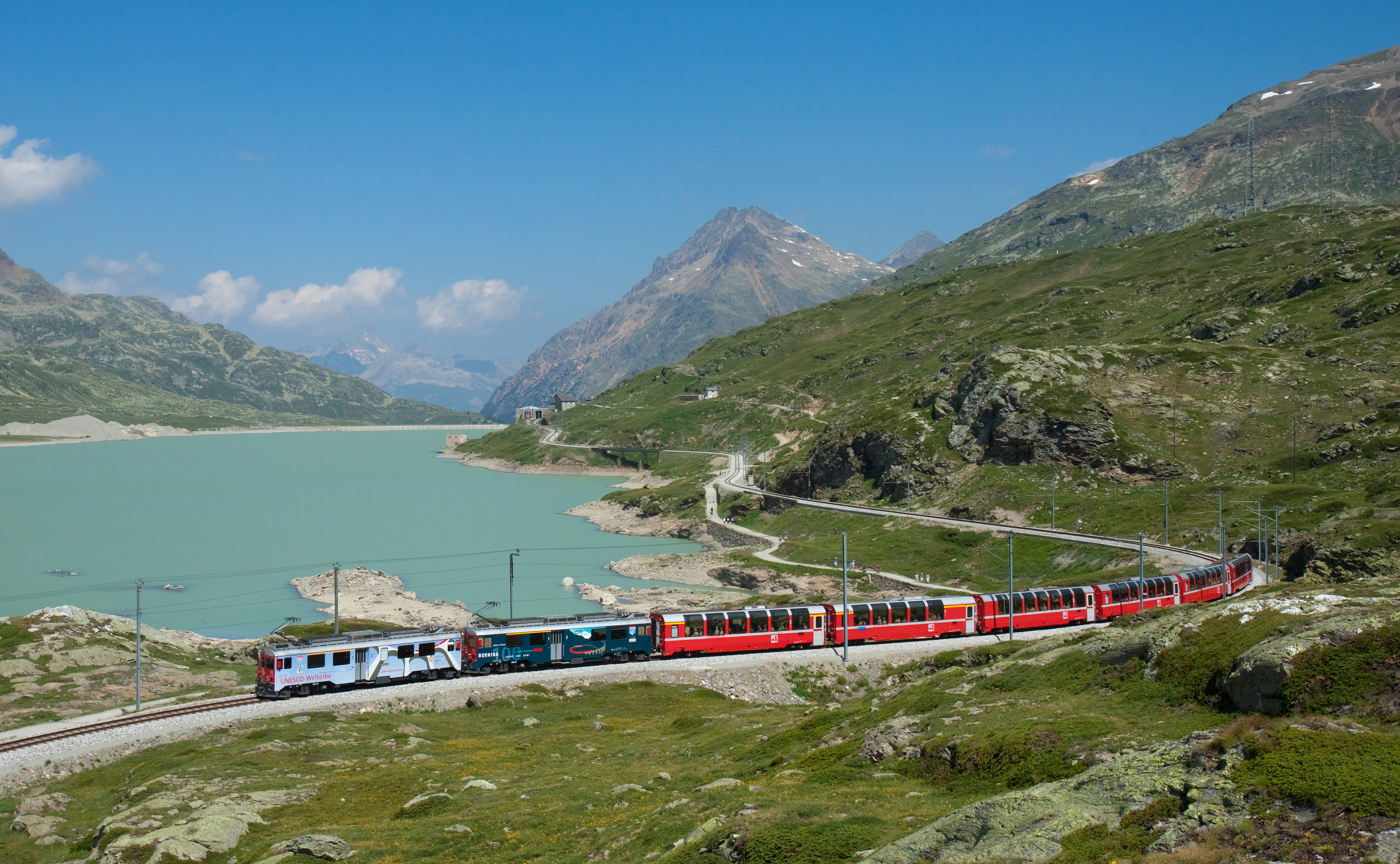
A Bernina Express crosses the Bernina Pass, the highest rail pass in Europe.

This is a list of highest passenger railways in operation in Europe. It includes only non-cable railways whose culminating point is over 1,200 metres above sea level. Most of them are located in the Alps, where two railways, the Jungfrau and Gornergrat railways, exceed 3,000 metres and nine other exceed 2,000 metres, including four railway crossings. The Pyrenees, which come second in height, include several railways above 1,500 metres.

In the Alps, the tree line and the permanent snow line lie respectively at about 2,000 and 3,000 metres. Because of the harsh weather conditions that prevail at those higher altitudes, maintaining working railways there is an expensive and difficult task. Snow, avalanches, rockslides and wind, added to the absence of protection by the forests, pose a challenge in every season. Lower elevation railways (even well below the tree line) are also exposed to more severe weather conditions in winter. Many of the high-elevation railway lines rely on heavy protection infrastructure with some of them built partially underground, notably the Jungfrau and Zugspitze railways.

This list includes both railways carrying primarily tourists and railways connecting actual localities. The former are typically the highest and the steepest, while the latter are generally longer lines with larger gauges. Railways that are both adhesion and standard gauge or wider, therefore part of the main European/Iberian rail network, are boldfaced in the list. Countries where the line is below 1,200 metres are indicated in small letters. For a list focusing on the highest railway stations, see list of highest railway stations in Europe.

== List ==
Railway	Country	Range	Highest point	Highest elevation	Maximum incline	Gauge	Rack railway	Type	Notes
Jungfrau	Switzerland	Alps	Jungfraujoch	3,454 m (11,332 ft)	25%	1,000 mm	Yes	Dead-end rail	Underground above 2,350 m, one of the highest railways in the world at the opening
Gornergrat	Switzerland	Alps	Gornergrat	3,090 m (10,138 ft)	20%	1,000 mm	Yes	Dead-end rail	Highest open-air railway in Europe
Zugspitze	Germany	Alps	Schneefernerhaus	2,650 m (8,694 ft)	25%	1,000 mm	Yes	Dead-end rail	Underground above 1,640 m, biggest height difference (1,945 m (6,381 ft))
Mont Blanc	France	Alps	Refuge-du-Nid-d'Aigle	2,412 m (7,913 ft)	24%	1,000 mm	Yes	Dead-end rail	Terminus extended from 2,372 m (7,782 ft) to 2,412 m (7,913 ft) in 2026
Bernina	Switzerland/Italy	Alps	Ospizio Bernina	2,253 m (7,392 ft)	7%	1,000 mm	No	Rail crossing	Highest rail crossing in Europe, open-air railway with the biggest height difference (1,824 m (5,984 ft)), highest point in Italy: 522 m
Brienz Rothorn	Switzerland	Alps	Brienzer Rothorn	2,244 m (7,362 ft)	25%	800 mm	Yes	Dead-end rail	Not electrified
Riffelalp	Switzerland	Alps	Riffelalp Resort	2,222 m (7,290 ft)	5%	800 mm	No	Dead-end rail	Not electrified
Furka Steam Railway	Switzerland	Alps	Furka railway station	2,163 m (7,096 ft)	11.8%	1,000 mm	Yes	Rail crossing	Not electrified, seasonal operations
Pilatus Railway	Switzerland	Alps	Pilatus	2,073 m (6,801 ft)	48%	800 mm	Yes	Dead-end rail	Steepest railway in the world
Lauterbrunnen–Kleine Scheidegg–Grindelwald	Switzerland	Alps	Kleine Scheidegg	2,061 m (6,762 ft)	25%	800 mm	Yes	Rail crossing	Rail crossing usually involves change of train at Kleine Scheidegg, the highest railway hub in Europe
Andermatt–Chur	Switzerland	Alps	Oberalp Pass	2,033 m (6,670 ft)	11%	1,000 mm	Yes	Rail crossing	
Montreux–Glion–Rochers-de-Naye	Switzerland	Alps	Rochers de Naye	1,968 m (6,457 ft)	22%	800 mm	Yes	Dead-end rail	
Schynige Platte	Switzerland	Alps	Schynige Platte	1,967 m (6,453 ft)	25%	800 mm	Yes	Dead-end rail	
Vall de Núria	Spain	Pyrenees	Núria	1,964 m (6,444 ft)	15%	1,000 mm	Yes	Dead-end rail	Highest railway in Europe outside the Alps
Artouste	France	Pyrenees	Station d'Artouste	1,940 m (6,365 ft)		500 mm	No	Dead-end rail	Accessible only by cable car
Montenvers	France	Alps	Hotel du Montenvers	1,913 m (6,276 ft)	22%	800 mm	Yes	Dead-end rail	
Les Montuires–Emosson	Switzerland	Alps	Les Montuires	1,822 m (5,978 ft)	1.46%	600 mm	No	Dead-end rail	Part of the Parc d'attractions du Châtelard
Albula	Switzerland	Alps	Albula Tunnel	1,820 m (5,971 ft)	3.5%	1,000 mm	No	Rail crossing	
Cercedilla–Cotos	Spain	Central System	Cotos railway station	1,818 m (5,965 ft)		1,000 mm	No	Dead-end rail	Highest railway operated by RENFE
Bex–Villars–Bretaye	Switzerland	Alps	Bretaye	1,806 m (5,925 ft)	20%	1,000 mm	Yes	Dead-end rail	
Schneeberg	Austria	Alps	Schneeberg	1,792 m (5,879 ft)	19.6%	1,000 mm	Yes	Dead-end rail	
Pontresina–Scuol-Tarasp	Switzerland	Alps	Pontresina	1,774 m (5,820 ft)	2.5%	1,000 mm	No	Dead-end rail	Lowest point at the terminus station (Scuol-Tarasp)
Rigi	Switzerland	Alps	Rigi Kulm	1,752 m (5,748 ft)	25%	1,435 mm	Yes	Rail crossing at Rigi Staffel, dead-end rail to the summit	Oldest mountain rack railway in Europe, rail crossing involves change of train at Rigi Staffel
Chur–Arosa	Switzerland	Alps	Arosa	1,739 m (5,705 ft)	6%	1,000 mm	No	Dead-end rail	
Schafberg	Austria	Alps	Schafberg	1,732 m (5,682 ft)	25.5%	1,000 mm	Yes	Dead-end rail	
Wendelstein	Germany	Alps	Wendelstein	1,723 m (5,653 ft)	23.7%	1,000 mm	Yes	Dead-end rail	
Kukushka	Georgia	Lesser Caucasus	Bakuriani	1,700 m (5,577 ft)		900 mm	No	Dead-end rail	Narrow-gauge railway line linking the town of Borjomi (820 m) to the ski resort of Bakuriani (1,700 m)
Grütschalp–Mürren	Switzerland	Alps	Mürren	1,639 m (5,377 ft)	5%	1,000 mm	No	Dead-end rail	Accessible only by cable car
Landquart–Klosters–Davos	Switzerland	Alps	Davos Wolfgang	1,625 m (5,331 ft)	4.5%	1,000 mm	No	Rail crossing	
Visp–Zermatt	Switzerland	Alps	Zermatt	1,605 m (5,266 ft)	12.5%	1,000 mm	Yes	Dead-end rail	
Monte Generoso	Switzerland	Alps	Generoso Vetta	1,601 m (5,253 ft)	22%	800 mm	Yes	Dead-end rail	
Cerdagne	France	Pyrenees	Bolquère-Eyne	1,592 m (5,223 ft)	6%	1,000 mm	No	Rail crossing	
**Portet-Saint-Simon–Puigcerdà**	France/Spain	Pyrenees	Porté-Puymorens	1,562 m (5,125 ft)	4%	1,435 mm	No	Rail crossing	Highest adhesion and standard gauge railway in Europe
Brig–Andermatt	Switzerland	Alps	Realp	1,538 m (5,046 ft)		1,000 mm	Yes	Rail crossing	
**Ripoll–Puigcerdà** (es)	Spain	Pyrenees	Toses tunnel	1,494 m (4,902 ft)		1,668 mm	No	Rail crossing	Highest adhesion and Iberian gauge Railway in Spain
Aigle–Leysin	Switzerland	Alps	Leysin Grand Hôtel	1,450 m (4,757 ft)	23%	1,000 mm	Yes	Dead-end rail	
Göschenen–Andermatt	Switzerland	Alps	Andermatt	1,436 m (4,711 ft)	17.9%	1,000 mm	Yes	Rail crossing	
Panoramique des Dômes	France	Massif Central	Puy de Dôme	1,406 m (4,613 ft)	20%	1,000 mm	Yes	Dead-end rail	
Mont-Blanc Express	France/Switzerland	Alps	Vallorcine	1,384 m (4,541 ft)	9 %	1,000 mm	No	Rail crossing	Operated by the Martigny–Châtelard and Saint-Gervais–Vallorcine railways
**Brenner**	Austria/Italy	Alps	Brenner	1,371 m (4,498 ft)	2.5%	1,435 mm	No	Rail crossing	
Vevey–Les Pléiades	Switzerland	Alps	Les Pléiades	1,360 m (4,462 ft)	20%	1,000 mm	Yes	Dead-end rail	
**Madrid–Hendaye** (es)	Spain/France	Central System	Herradón-La Cañada railway station	1,360 m (4,462 ft)		1,668 mm	No	Rail crossing	
Tatra	Slovakia	Tatra Mountains	Štrbské Pleso	1,350 m (4,429 ft)	15%	1,000 mm	Yes	Rail crossing	
**Fréjus**	Italy/France	Alps	Fréjus Tunnel	1,338 m (4,390 ft)	3%	1,435 mm	No	Rail crossing	
**Arlberg**	Austria	Alps	Arlberg Tunnel	1,311 m (4,301 ft)	3.1%	1,435 mm	No	Rail crossing	
**Villalba–Segovia** (es)	Spain	Central System	Gudillos tunnel	1,300 m (4,265 ft)		1,668 mm	No	Rail crossing	
Montreux–Lenk im Simmental line	Switzerland	Alps	Saanenmöser Pass	1,279 m (4,196 ft)	7%	1,000 mm	No	Rail crossing	
**León–Gijón** (es)	Spain	Cantabrian Mountains	La Perruca tunnel	1,278 m (4,193 ft)		1,668 mm	No	Rail crossing	
**Sulmona–Isernia**	Italy	Apennines	Rivisondoli–Pescocostanzo	1,268 m (4,160 ft)		1,435 mm	No	Rail crossing	
Septemvri–Dobrinishte	Bulgaria	Between Rhodope and Rila Mountains	Avramovo	1,267 m (4,157 ft)	3.2%	760 mm	No	Rail crossing	Highest railway in the Balkan Peninsula
Ritten	Italy	Alps	Rappersbichl	1,255 m (4,117 ft)		1,000 mm	No	Dead-end rail	Accessible by cable car
**Lötschberg**	Switzerland	Alps	Lötschberg Tunnel	1,240 m (4,068 ft)	2.7%	1,435 mm	No	Rail crossing	Highest adhesion and standard gauge railway in Switzerland
**Bergen**	Norway	Scandinavian Mountains	Finse Tunnel	1,237 m (4,058 ft)		1,435 mm	No	Rail crossing	Highest railway in Scandinavia
Nyon–St-Cergue–La Cure	Switzerland	Jura Mountains	Col de la Givrine	1,228 m (4,029 ft)	6%	1,000 mm	No	Dead-end rail	Highest railway in the Jura Mountains
**Tauern**	Austria	Alps	Tauern Tunnel	1,226 m (4,022 ft)	3%	1,435 mm	No	Rail crossing	
**Sagunto–Zaragoza** (es)	Spain	Iberian System	Puerto Escandón railway station	1,218 m (3,996 ft)		1,668 mm	No	Rail crossing	
**Madrid–Barcelona high-speed rail line**	Spain	Iberian System	Somewhere between Layna and Arbujuelo during the brief pass of the line through Castile and León	1,217 m (3,993 ft)		1,435 mm	No	Rail crossing	Highest high-speed rail line in Spain. Highest adhesion and standard gauge railway in Spain. According to Google Earth, around N 41.1085°, W 2.3673°, the line is at 1,230 m AMSL. Name of the location at the highest point (if it has any) needs to be confirmed by reliable sources. The kilometer point on which it is located could be an alternative.
**Monastier–La Bastide-Saint-Laurent-les-Bains** (fr)	France	Massif Central	Allenc	1,215 m (3,986 ft)	2.7 %	1,435 mm	No	Rail crossing	
**Erzberg** (de)	Austria	Alps	Präbichl	1,204 m (3,950 ft)	7.1%	1,435 mm	No	Rail crossing	
**Veynes–Briançon** (fr)	France	Alps	Briançon	1,203 m (3,947 ft)	2.5%	1,435 mm	No	Dead-end rail	
**Madrid–Asturias high-speed rail line**	Spain	Central System	Guadarrama Tunnel	1,200 m (3,937 ft)		1,435 mm	No	Rail crossing	High-speed rail line

== See also ==
- List of highest paved roads in Europe
- Rail transport in Europe
- List of mountain railways in Switzerland
- List of highest railways
- Extreme points of Europe
