= Christmas with Flicka =

- Kultur DVD, D2986
- Genre: Christmas music
- Written by: Yanna Kroyt Brandt
- Directed by: Patricia Birch
- Starring: Frederica von Stade
- Country of origin: Austria
- Original language: English

Production
- Producer: Yanna Kroyt Brandt
- Running time: 58 minutes

Original release
- Release: 1989

Christmas with Flicka is a 58-minute television concert film starring Frederica "Flicka" von Stade and featuring Melba Moore, Rex Smith and Julius Rudel. It is an American-Austrian co-production, shot on location in Austria in 1987.

== Synopsis ==
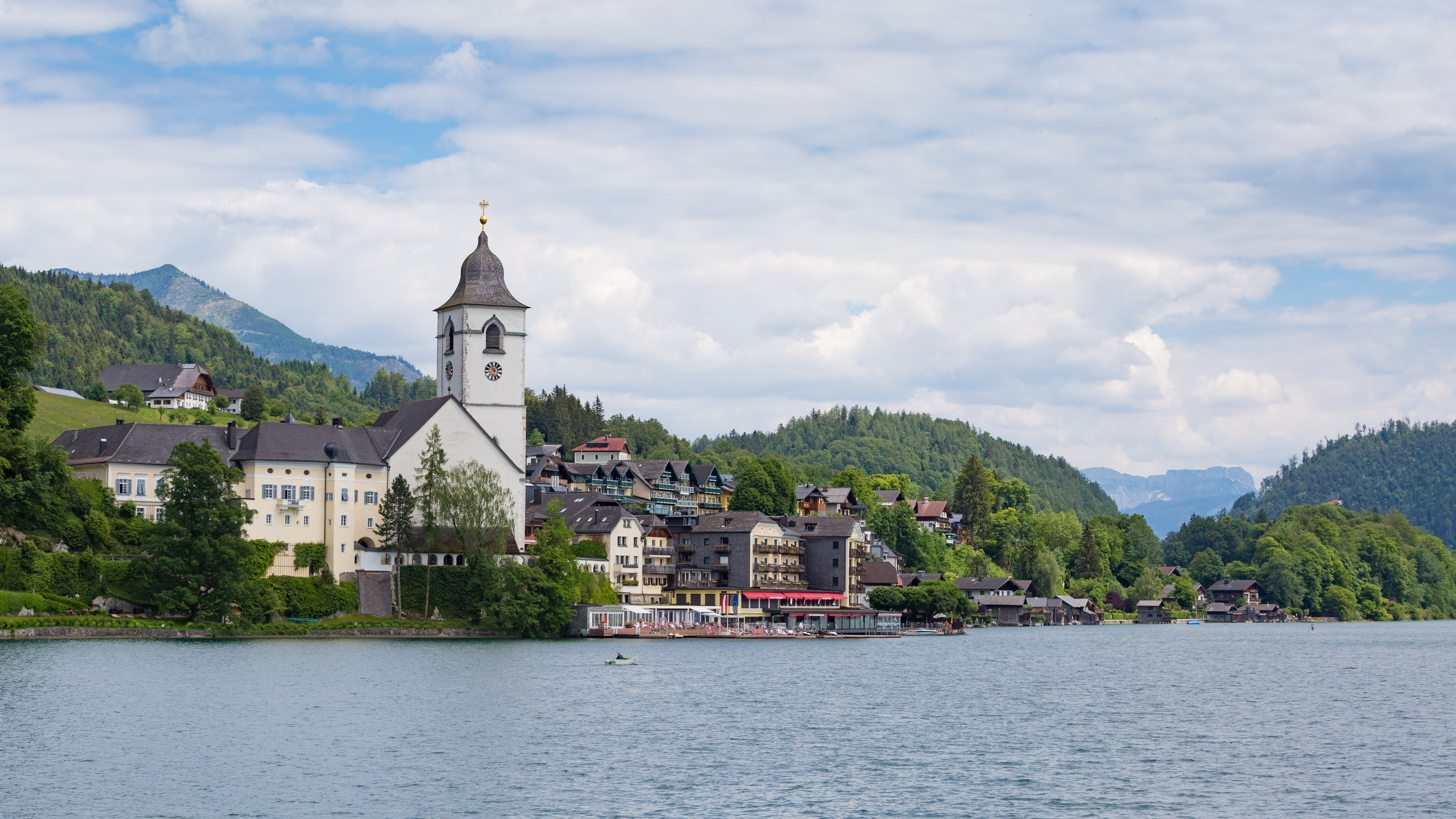
St Wolfgang, photographed from the Wolfgangsee by Dmitry A. Mottl

Part concert, part travel documentary and with a tincture of comedy and fantasy, this 58-minute television movie follows the American operatic mezzo-soprano Frederica "Flicka" von Stade, the Broadway singers Rex Smith and Melba Moore and the classical conductor and pianist Julius Rudel through a four day Christmas holiday in St. Wolfgang im Salzkammergut, a village on the shores of the Wolfgangsee in the Salzburg region of the Austrian Alps. The making of the film was inspired by von Stade's memories of visiting the village with her family in her infancy and imagining that spending Christmas there would be delightful.

The movie begins with von Stade arriving at the village's quayside on the ferry-boat Österreich (with the Christmas melodies "À Bethléem allons vite" and "On annonce une nouvelle"). She is met by a small, rapt girl and a smaller, less rapt boy, who take her to the home that she will be sharing with them.

The following morning, after helping the children to get dressed ("The first Noël"), von Stade leads them on a shopping trip to the local shops, visiting a greengrocer, a butcher, a delicatessen, a patisserie, a florist, a gift shop, a traditional Austrian clothes shop, a man who makes candles for Christmas wreaths and a man who carves wooden figures for Christmas crèches ("The twelve days of Christmas"). Her purchases offloaded, she accompanies the children on an expedition up and down the misty Schafberg on the Schafbergbahn, a coal-fired rack railway ("Deck the halls").

In the evening, with the children safely tucked up in bed ("Little Jesus sleeps"), she joins Moore, Smith and Rudel on a visit to an old-fashioned tavern for an evening of beer, romance and folk dancing with women in dirndl costumes and thigh-slapping men in lederhosen (folk dance, "God rest ye merry gentlemen"). Rex Smith entertains the company with a song ("Greensleeves"). On the way home, von Stade and her friends encounter three mysterious, kingly horsemen who seem like a vision of the Magi ("À Bethléem, quand L'Enfant Dieu").

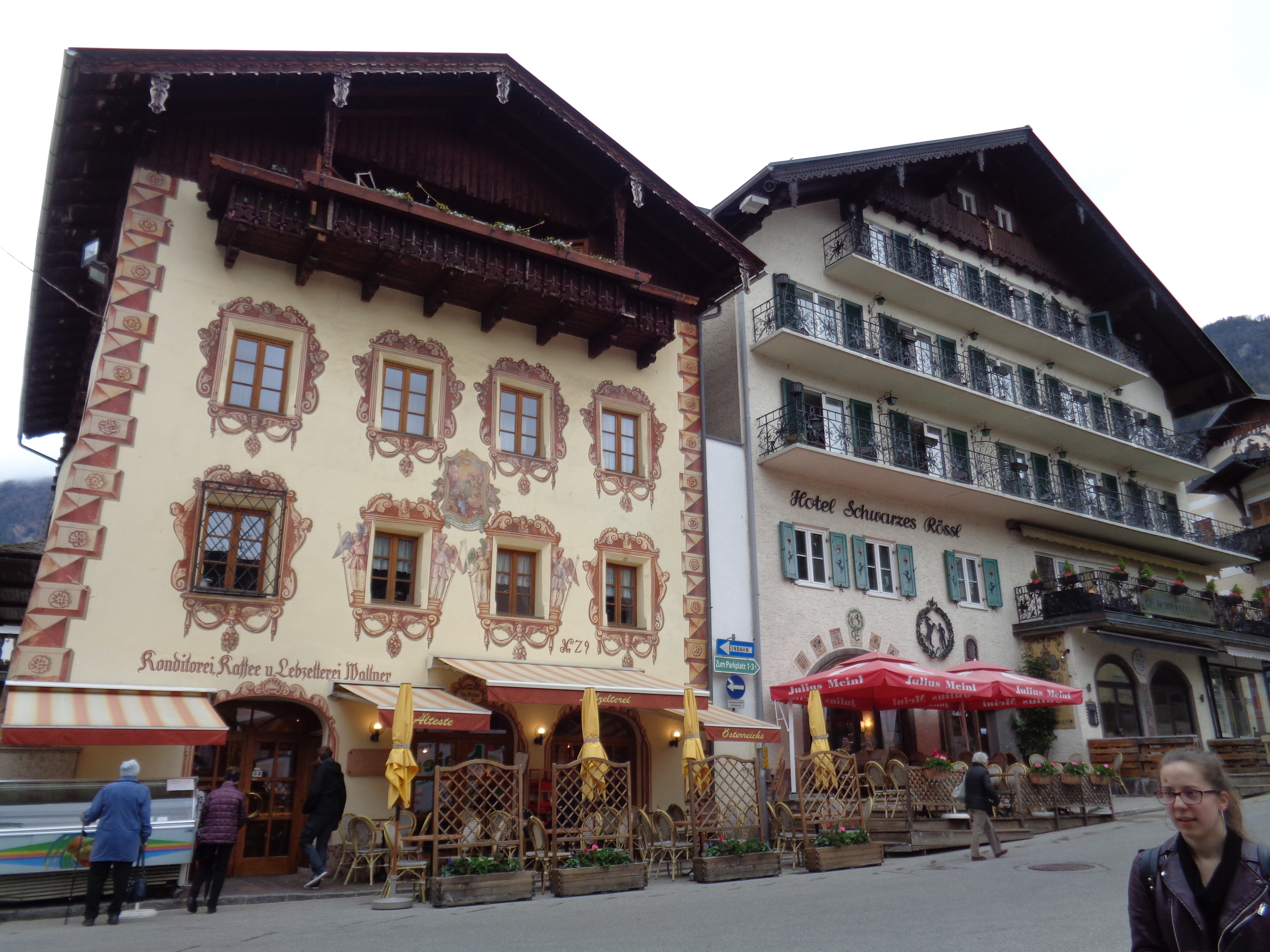
Examples of St Wolfgang's architecture

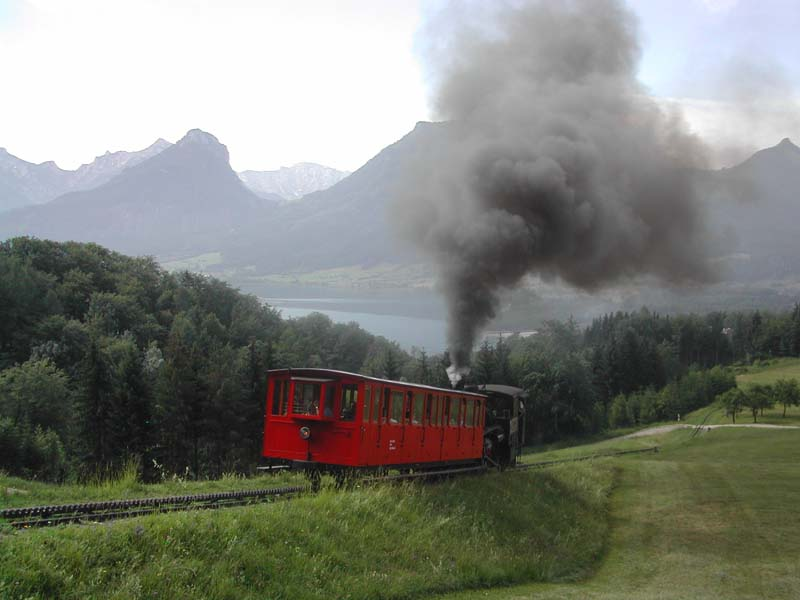
St. Wolfgang's rack railway

The next day, Christmas Eve, begins with von Stade going with the children to the town square where brass players high in the tower of the local church have summoned them ("Est ist ein Ros' entsprungen") for some folk dancing ("Joy to the world").

In the evening, she gives a song recital with Moore and Rudel ("Les bergers", "Rise up, shepherd, and follow") and meets the village's soprano choir ("O Dieu, O Dieu"). Once back home with her hosts, von Stade and Rudel tell the children how people came to celebrate Christmas with conifer trees ("O Tannenbaum", "O little town of Bethlehem"). Then, explaining the history of Santa Claus on the way, she walks with them and the rest of the villagers in a candlelit procession to church ("Chantons tous le plus haut") for Midnight Mass ("He shall feed His flock", "Alleluia"), before she takes them home again and puts them to bed with a lullaby ("Silent night").

A concluding Christmas morning sequence recapitulates the highlights of the film (reprise of "The twelve days of Christmas") and offers up several humorous outtakes before the credits roll (reprise of "Alleluia").

== Music ==
The film includes twenty-three pieces of music:

- "À Bethléem allons vite", after Canteloube; instrumental version
- "On annonce une nouvelle"; von Stade and choir
- "The first Noël", von Stade
- "The twelve days of Christmas"; von Stade
- "Deck the halls"; von Stade
- "Little Jesus sleeps"; von Stade
- Folk dance; accordion band
- "God rest ye, merry gentlemen"; von Stade
- "Greensleeves", arr. Peter Wimmer; Smith
- "À Bethléem, quand L'Enfant-Dieu", arr. Canteloube; von Stade. Moore and Smith
- "Es ist ein Ros' entsprungen"; brass band
- "Joy to the world"; von Stade
- "Les bergers" (Frank Martin); von Stade and Rudel
- "Rise up, shepherd, and follow". arr. James Elmo Dorsey; Moore
- "O Dieu, O Dieu", arr. Canteloube; von Stade, Moore and choir
- "O Tannenbaum"; von Stade
- "O little town of Bethlehem"; von Stade
- "Chantons tous le plus haut", arr. Canteloube; von Stade
- "He shall feed his flock" from The Messiah (Handel); von Stade and Rudel (organ)
- "Alleluia" from Exsultate, Jubilate (Mozart); von Stade
- "Stille Nacht, heilige Nacht" ("Silent Night") (Gruber); von Stade
- "The twelve days of Christmas" (reprise); von Stade
- "Alleluia" from Exsultate, Jubilate (Mozart) (reprise); von Stade

== Credits ==
- Frederica von Stade (singer)
- Melba Moore (singer)
- Rex Smith (singer)
- Kammer Ensemble des Wiener Jeunesse
- Mixed Choir of St Wolfgang
- Werner Tripp (flute)
- Karl Swoboda (zither)
- Johanna Steinberger (zither)
- Jan Josef Wnek (keyboards)
- Frank Edele (guitar)
- Heinz Hruza (accordion)
- Mathäus Eisl (accordion)
- Brass band of St Wolfgang
- Sonja Schweiger (actor)
- Adrian Steffny (actor)
- Beverley Francis (reel dancer)
- Children's Folk Dance Group of St Wolfgang
- Trachtenverein Dancers
- Österreichischer Rundfunk Symphonie-Orchester
- Julius Rudel (piano, organ, conductor and music director)
- Yanna Kroyt Brandt (writer and producer)
- Patricia Birch (director)

== Critical reception ==
In 1987, the Los Angeles Times's John Henken found the film "as pretty as a post card - and not much livelier". "Taped in October without a hint of snow, the program follows [von Stade] around [St Wolfgang] and environs, looking like outtakes from an exceptionally sedate travelogue. The musical selections are nicely sung, though the lip-syncing is often only approximate. The international carols newly arranged by Joseph Canteloube [who had died in 1957] prove particularly effective in Von Stade's smooth, silken singing and the touristy context."

In 1988, readers of Opera Canada were advised to "run, not walk, as they say, to the nearest record store" to add Christmas with Flicka to their video collections. The film was also discussed in Rebecca Krafft and Brian O'Doherty's The Arts on Television, 1976-1990 (1991).

== Broadcast and home media history ==
The film was made in 1987, and was broadcast in the US as part of the Great Performances series in December 1989. In 1998, VIEW Video released it through Image Entertainment as a Laserdisc with 4:3 NTSC colour video and Dolby Digital stereo audio, and also as a VHS cassette. In 2005, Kultur released it on a region-free DVD (catalogue number D2986), again with 4:3 NTSC colour video and Dolby Digital stereo audio. The only literature that comes with the DVD is a list of the film's chapters. None of the home media releases of the film includes any behind-the-scenes featurettes.

== See also ==
- A Carnegie Hall Christmas Concert, starring Frederica von Stade, Kathleen Battle, Wynton Marsalis and André Previn
