= A Carnegie Hall Christmas Concert =

1991 TV film

- Kultur DVD: D4157

Production
- Running time: 89 minutes

Original release
- Network: PBS
- Release: 1991

A Carnegie Hall Christmas Concert is an 89-minute television film starring the opera singers Kathleen Battle and Frederica von Stade, the jazz trumpeter Wynton Marsalis, the Wynton Marsalis Septet, the American Boychoir, the Christmas Concert Chorus, the Orchestra of St. Luke's and the pianist and conductor André Previn. It first aired as part of PBS's Great Performances series in 1991, and was subsequently released on VHS, Laserdisc, DVD and CD. It was jointly produced by CAMI Video, Sony, PBS and WNET.

== Synopsis ==
The film presents thirty pieces of music performed before an audience in the main auditorium of Carnegie Hall, New York City on 8 December 1991. The soloists mostly stand on a multi-level platform at the front of the stage, the back of which is decorated with three large, lavish panels of Christmas imagery inspired by designs on a Russian lacquer box. The music, presented without any interrupting dialogue, is both sacred and secular. It is drawn from many traditions and performed in a variety of styles, ranging from a cappella hymnody to jazz improvisation. Included in the programme are American spirituals, traditional European carols, songs by the twentieth century American composers Hugh Martin, Richard Rodgers and Mel Tormé and compositions by the classical composers Adam, Handel, Humperdinck, Mozart, Praetorius, Prokofiev and Reger. The concert's arrangements by Nancy Allen, Arthur Harris and Alexander Courage – the first composer of music for Star Trek – were specially commissioned for it.

== DVD chapter listing ==
- Opening fanfare (Sony Classical Records logo from VHS tape)
- Jester Hairston (1901–2000): "Mary's Little Boy Chile", orchestrated by Hale Smith (Kathleen Battle, Frederica von Stade, Wynton Marsalis, Crusher Bennett [calypso percussion], Victor See Yuen [calypso percussion], Boychoir, Chorus, Orchestra)
- Traditional: "The Twelve Days of Christmas", arranged by Arthur Harris (Ensemble)
- Pietro Alessandro Yon (1886–1943): "Gesù bambino", arranged by Arthur Harris (Kathleen Battle, Frederica von Stade, Boychoir, Orchestra)
- Wolfgang Amadeus Mozart (1756–1791): "Alleluja" from Exsultate, jubilate (Kathleen Battle, Orchestra)
- Felix Bernard (1897–1944): "Winter Wonderland", arranged by Wynton Marsalis (The Wynton Marsalis Septet)
- Michael Praetorius (1571–1621): "Lo, How a Rose E'er Blooming" (Es ist ein Ros' entsprungen), arranged by Arthur Harris (Frederica von Stade, Boychoir, Chorus)
- Sergei Prokofiev (1891–1953): "Troika" from Lieutenant Kijé (Orchestra)
- John Jacob Niles (1892–1980): "I Wonder as I Wander", arranged by Robert Sadin (Frederica von Stade, Nancy Allen, Orchestra)
- Traditional: "Mary Had a Baby", arranged by Robert Sadin (Kathleen Battle, Wynton Marsalis, Boychoir, Chorus, Orchestra)
- Traditional: "Oh Mary, What You Gonna Name That Pretty Little Baby", arranged by Sylvia Olden Lee, adapted and orchestrated by Robert Sadin (Kathleen Battle, Frederica von Stade, Chorus, Orchestra)
- Traditional: "Who Was Mary? Mary Was Queen of Galilee", arranged by Wendell Whalum, adapted and orchestrated by Robert Sadin (Kathleen Battle, Frederica von Stade, Wynton Marsalis, Chorus, Orchestra)
- Traditional: "Sister Mary Had-a But One Child", arranged by Roland Hayes, adapted by Nancy Allen (Kathleen Battle, Nancy Allen)
- Traditional: "Go Tell It on the Mountain", arranged by Don Marsh, orchestrated by Arthur Harris (Kathleen Battle, Frederica von Stade, Wynton Marsalis, Boychoir, Chorus, Orchestra)
- George Frideric Handel (1685–1759), adapted by Lowell Mason: "Joy to the World"; text by Isaac Watts; arranged by Wynton Marsalis (The Wynton Marsalis Septet)
- Franz Xaver Gruber (1787–1863): "Silent Night" (Stille Nacht); text by Joseph Mohr; arranged by Wynton Marsalis (Kathleen Battle, The Wynton Marsalis Septet)
- Richard Rodgers (1902–1979): "My Favorite Things" from The Sound of Music; text by Oscar Hammerstein II; arranged by Arthur Harris (Frederica von Stade, Orchestra)
- Mel Tormé (1925–1999): "The Christmas Song"; text by Robert Wells and Mel Tormé; (Kathleen Battle, Tony Falanga [bass], James Saporito [drums], André Previn [piano])
- Hugh Martin (1914–2011): "Have Yourself a Merry Little Christmas"; text by Ralph Blane; (Frederica von Stade, André Previn [piano])
- John Henry Hopkins Jr. (1820–1891): "We Three Kings of Orient Are", arranged by Wynton Marsalis (The Wynton Marsalis Septet)
- Engelbert Humperdinck (1854–1921): "Abends will ich schlafen gehn" from Hänsel und Gretel; text by Adelheid Wette; (Kathleen Battle, Frederica von Stade, Orchestra)
- Max Reger (1873–1916): "Mariae Wiegenlied"; text by Martin Boelitz); arranged by Robert Sadin (Kathleen Battle, Frederica von Stade, Orchestra)
- Traditional English: "I Saw Three Ships", arranged by Alexander Courage (Kathleen Battle, Frederica von Stade, Boychoir, Chorus, Orchestre)
- Traditional: "The First Noël", arranged by Alexander Courage (Kathleen Battle, Frederica von Stade, Nancy Allen, Chorus, Orchestra)
- Traditional American: "Away in a Manger", arranged by Alexander Courage (Frederica von Stade, Orchestra)
- Traditional English: "Away in a Manger", arranged by Alexander Courage (Kathleen Battle, Nancy Allen, Boychoir, Orchestra)
- Traditional Welsh: "Deck the Halls", arranged by Alexander Courage (Kathleen Battle, Frederica von Stade, Chorus, Orchestra)
- Traditional English: "The Holly and the Ivy", arranged by Alexander Courage (Kathleen Battle, Frederica von Stade, Boychoir, Orchestra)
- Adolphe Adam (1803–1856): "O Holy Night" (O nuit divine), arranged by Alexander Courage (Kathleen Battle, Frederica von Stade, Chorus, Orchestra)
- Traditional French: "Angels We Have Heard On High", arranged by Alexander Courage (Kathleen Battle, Frederica von Stade, Boychoir, Chorus, Orchestra)

== CD track listing ==
- 1 (5:33) Traditional: "The Twelve Days of Christmas", arranged by Arthur Harris (Ensemble)
- 2 (4:16) Jester Hairston (1901–2000): "Mary's Little Boy Chile", orchestrated by Hale Smith (Kathleen Battle, Frederica von Stade, Wynton Marsalis, Crusher Bennett [calypso percussion], Victor See Yuen [calypso percussion], Boychoir, Chorus, Orchestra)
- 3 (3:51) Pietro Alessandro Yon (1886–1943): "Gesù Bambino", arranged by Arthur Harris (Kathleen Battle, Frederica von Stade, Boychoir, Orchestra)
- 4 (2:42) Wolfgang Amadeus Mozart (1756–1791): "Alleluja" from Exsultate, jubilate (Kathleen Battle, Orchestra)
- 5 (2:30) Richard Rodgers (1902–1979): "My Favorite Things" from The Sound of Music; text by Oscar Hammerstein II; arranged by Arthur Harris (Frederica von Stade, Orchestra)
- 6 (2:46) Felix Bernard (1897–1944): "Winter Wonderland", arranged by Wynton Marsalis (The Wynton Marsalis Septet)
- 7 (5:09) John Henry Hopkins Jr. (1820–1891): "We Three Kings of Orient Are", arranged by Wynton Marsalis (The Wynton Marsalis Septet)
- 8 (16:19) Medley of American songs
  - John Jacob Niles (1892–1980): "I Wonder as I Wander", arranged by Robert Sadin (Frederica von Stade, Nancy Allen, Orchestra)
  - Traditional: "Mary Had a Baby", arranged by Robert Sadin (Kathleen Battle, Wynton Marsalis, Boychoir, Chorus, Orchestra)
  - Traditional: "Oh Mary, What You Gonna Name That Pretty Little Baby", arranged by Sylvia Olden Lee, adapted and orchestrated by Robert Sadin (Kathleen Battle, Frederica von Stade, Chorus, Orchestra)
  - Traditional: "Who Was Mary? Mary Was Queen of Galilee", arranged by Wendell Whalum, adapted and orchestrated by Robert Sadin (Kathleen Battle, Frederica von Stade, Wynton Marsalis, Chorus, Orchestra)
  - Traditional: "Sister Mary Had-a But One Child", arranged by Roland Hayes, adapted by Nancy Allen (Kathleen Battle, Nancy Allen)
  - Traditional: "Go Tell It on the Mountain", arranged by Don Marsh, orchestrated by Arthur Harris (Kathleen Battle, Frederica von Stade, Wynton Marsalis, Boychoir, Chorus, Orchestra)
- 9 (4:45) Medley
  - Mel Tormé (1925–1999): "The Christmas Song"; text by Robert Wells and Mel Tormé; (Kathleen Battle, Tony Falanga [bass], James Saporito [drums], André Previn [piano])
  - Hugh Martin (1914–2011): "Have Yourself a Merry Little Christmas"; text by Ralph Blane; (Frederica von Stade, André Previn [piano])
- 10 (5:00) Franz Xaver Gruber (1787–1863): "Silent Night" (Stille Nacht); text by Joseph Mohr; arranged by Wynton Marsalis (Kathleen Battle, The Wynton Marsalis Septet)
- 11 (2:44) George Frideric Handel (1685–1785), adapted by Lowell Mason: "Joy to the World"; text by Isaac Watts; arranged by Wynton Marsalis (The Wynton Marsalis Septet)
- 12 (3:41) Engelbert Humperdinck (1854–1921): "Abends will ich schlafen gehn" from Hänsel und Gretel; text by Adelheid Wette; (Kathleen Battle, Frederica von Stade, Orchestra)
- 13 (4:04) Michael Praetorius (1571–1621): "Lo, How a Rose E'er Blooming" (Es ist ein Ros' entsprungen), arranged by Arthur Harris (Frederica von Stade, Boychoir, Chorus)
- 14 (2:03) Max Reger (1873–1916): "Maria Wiegenlied"; text by Martin Boelitz; arranged by Robert Sadin (Kathleen Battle, Frederica von Stade, Orchestra)
- 15 (10:57) Medley, arranged by Alexander Courage
  - Traditional English: "I Saw Three Ships" (Kathleen Battle, Frederica von Stade, Boychoir, Chorus, Orchestra)
  - Traditional: "The First Noël" (Kathleen Battle, Frederica von Stade, Nancy Allen, Chorus, Orchestra)
  - Traditional American: "Away in a Manger" (Frederica von Stade, Orchestra)
  - Traditional English: "Away in a Manger" (Kathleen Battle, Nancy Allen, Boychoir, Orchestra)
  - Traditional Welsh: "Deck the Halls" (Kathleen Battle, Frederica von Stade, Chorus, Orchestra)
  - Traditional English: "The Holly and the Ivy" (Kathleen Battle, Frederica von Stade, Boychoir, Orchestra)
  - Adolphe Adam (1803–1856): "O Holy Night" (O nuit divine) (Kathleen Battle, Frederica von Stade, Chorus, Orchestra)
  - Traditional French: "Angels We Have Heard on High" (Kathleen Battle, Frederica von Stade, Boychoir, Chorus, Orchestra)

== Personnel ==
=== Musical ===
- Kathleen Battle, soprano
- Frederica von Stade, mezzo-soprano
- The Wynton Marsalis Septet:
- Wynton Marsalis, trumpet;
- Wes Anderson, alto saxophone;
- Herbert Harris, tenor and soprano saxophones;
- Wycliffe Gordon, trombone;
- Reginald Veal, bass;
- Stephen Scott, piano; and
- Herlin Riley, drums
- Nancy Allen, harp
- Crusher Bennett, calypso percussion
- Victor See Yuen, calypso percussion
- Tony Falanga, bass
- James Saporito, drums
- American Boychoir (directed by James Litton)
- Christmas Concert Chorus (directed by Robert De Cormier)
- Orchestra of St. Luke's
- André Previn (1929–2019), piano and conductor

=== Other ===
- Brian Large, video director
- David Kneuss, stage director
- John Michael Deegan, scenery designer
- Sarah G. Conly, scenery designer
- Alan Adelman, lighting designer
- Mark Schubin, engineer-in-chief
- Tom Lazarus, audio engineer
- Ken Hahn, audio mixer
- Thomas Frost, audio producer
- Steven Epstein, audio producer
- John Alberts, audio post-production
- Gary Bradley, editor
- Daniel Anker, producer
- Laura Mitgang, producer
- Peter Gelb, executive producer

== Broadcast and home media history ==
The concert was first aired in the US on 11 December 1991, broadcast by PBS in its Great Performances series. There was an 8 p.m. transmission on Channel 13 and an 8:45 p.m. transmission on Channel 21, the former accompanied by a stereo simulcast on WQXR. In 1992 PBS broadcast the concert again, and Sony released it on VHS and Laserdisc. Subsequently, Kultur reissued the concert on DVD (catalogue number D4157). presenting it unabridged, framed at 4:3, in colour (using the NTSC video standard) and with Dolby Digital stereo sound. Kultur's disc offered no bonus features nor any liner notes beyond a rudimentary track listing.

On 6 October 1992, Sony released the concert on a 76-minute CD (catalogue number SK 48235). Sony's disc omitted the concert's only purely orchestral items (the opening fanfare and the Troika from Prokofiev's Lieutenant Kijé) and arranged the other pieces of music in a different order. It came with a 20-page insert booklet that included no texts or translations but provided a detailed track listing, an essay on the concert and seven photographs taken during the performance. In 2016 Sony reissued the album with a 52-page booklet in their 18-CD collection Frederica von Stade: The Complete Columbia Recital Albums (catalogue number 88875183412).

== Critical reception ==
John J. O'Connor reviewed the concert in a television column in The New York Times on 11 December 1991. He had mixed feelings about the producers' choice of music, some of which he thought hackneyed. "Am I the only person in New York", he asked, "who, after sitting through hundreds of ornate renditions, finds 'The 12 Days of Christmas' numbingly tedious?" He was more complimentary about the calypso-infused 'Mary's Little Boy Chile' and a sequence of traditional American Marian numbers, as well as rousing ensemble versions of 'Go Tell It on the Mountain' and 'Angels We Have Heard On High'. He conceded that Previn's conducting and the concert's specially commissioned arrangements made some old chestnuts sound new again. Battle, in puff-ball-sleeved scarlet, was "quite dazzling in her upper registers and gets there often enough to make sure no one forgets it". Von Stade, sheathed in glittering emerald, was more expressive in her hymns than in her spirituals. Wynton Marsalis punctuated proceedings with his trumpet's "soulful wailings". The standing ovation at the end of the concert was well earned.

The English classical vocal critic J. B. Steane reviewed the CD edition of the concert in Gramophone in December 1992. He mocked the album's choice of compositions and arrangements, noting that 'The Twelve Days of Christmas' included a fragment of 'Ist ein Traum' from Der Rosenkavalier, that Reger's lullaby sounded like a duet that Strauss's Sophie and Octavian might have sung at their first Christmas together and that 'Silent Night' had been given a "smoochy accompaniment" which at times sounded as though it had been devised for another song altogether. For the performers, on the other hand, he had nothing but praise, applauding Battle's "unflawed purity of tone", von Stade's "characteristic warmth", Marsalis's eloquent trumpet, the cool expertise of his Septet and the geniality of Previn on the podium. All was bright and sweetly shining in the light of Carnegie Hall, he wrote – it was all "so happy and snappy, so gifted and sweet" that its sheer quantity of Christmas icing sugar made him scowl like Charles Dickens's Ebenezer Scrooge. Still, the concert was rich in ingenuity and charm and it was obvious that the audience had enjoyed it, and the album had captured the spirit of the occasion successfully.

== See also ==
- Christmas with Flicka, starring Frederica von Stade, Melba Moore, Rex Smith and Julius Rudel
