= Schafberg Railway =

Narrow-gauge rack railway in Austria

Coordinates: 47°45′23″N 13°25′49″E

Schafbergbahn
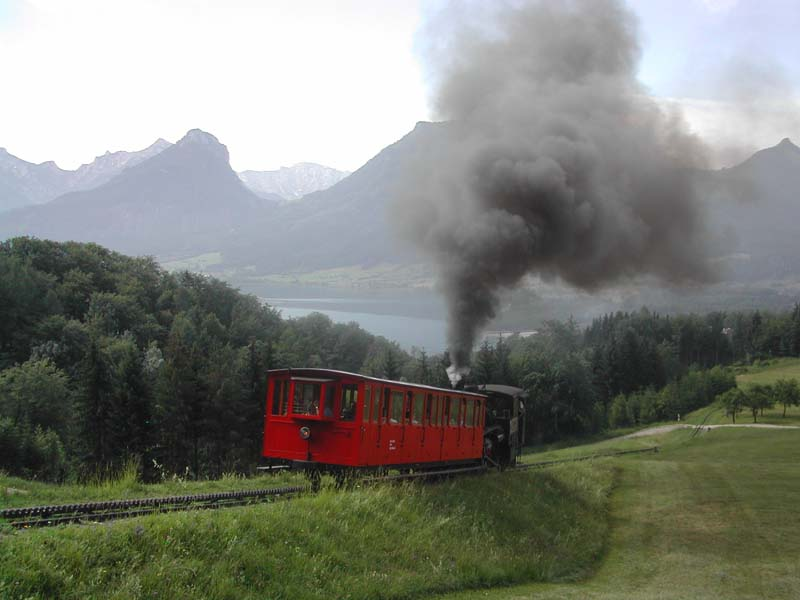
- Schafbergbahn near St. Wolfgang

Overview
- Owner: Austrian Federal Railways (ÖBB)
- Locale: St. Wolfgang (Austria)
- Termini: St. Wolfgang; Schafbergspitze
- Stations: 3

Service
- Type: Rack railway
- Operator: SLB

History
- Opened: 1893

Technical
- Line length: 5.85 km (3.64 mi)
- Number of tracks: Single track
- Track gauge: 1,000 mm (3 ft 3 3/8 in)
- Electrification: no
- Maximum incline: 26%

The Schafberg Railway (German: Schafbergbahn) is a metre gauge cog railway in Upper Austria and Salzburg leading from Sankt Wolfgang im Salzkammergut up to the Schafberg (1,783 m). With a total length of 5.85 km it rises about 1,200 m.

Construction of the Schafberg Railway commenced in 1892 and operations begun during the following year. It is owned by Austrian Federal Railways (ÖBB) and operated by the local company SchafbergBahn und Wolfgangsee Schifffahrt (SLB), part of the Salzburg AG group, The railway has operated both traditional steam locomotives and diesel traction, including railcars. It has been claimed to be the oldest steam-worked rack railway in Austria.

== History ==
During the nineteenth century, the Schafberg became popular with climbers, particularly due to its view from the summit from which as many as five lakes of Austria's Lake District can be spotted. Since 1839, a climber's hut has been in place at the summit to better accommodate the growing numbers of visitors. By the latter part of the century, there were calls to construct a railway up the mountain to capitalise on these movements; a key advocate of the concept was the entrepreneur Bertholt Curant. From the onset, the railway was envisioned for use primarily by tourists. It was also recognised that joint services could be offered with ferries across the adjacent lake.

During April 1892, construction of the Schafberg Railway commenced. It was built by a mostly Italian workforce numbering roughly 350, while virtually all materials, including tools and living supplies, were transported via mules, which reportedly performed in excess of 6,000 trips to the various work sites during the line's construction. The work continued throughout the winter of 1892/93, being only suspended briefly during the most extreme weather conditions. The trackbed had to be carved out of the mountain side along with numerous cuttings, culverts, and bridges; major civil engineering features include a 24 metre long viaduct, several arched stone bridges, rock cuttings, and a pair of tunnels, the longest having a length of 91 metres. Despite the challenge of the work and the impressive civil engineering often required, construction proceeded at a relatively fast rate.

Within roughly one year, all of the line's core features had been completed, enabling the railway to be opened for the first time on 1 August 1893. From end to end, the line stretches 5.85 km (3.65 miles), between the lakeside station at St Wolfgang Schafbergbahnhof and the summit station of Schafbergspitze, covering a difference in altitude of 1,190 metres (4,024 ft) between these two locations. The Schafberg Railway is a cog railway, using the Abt system with a rail gauge of 1,000 mm (3 ft 3 3/8 in).

A total of three locomotives were originally ordered to work the railway, the last of which being delivered during 1894. In addition to the railway itself, further supporting projects were undertaken around this time; the line's summit lacked most amenities for passengers until after the turn of the century. Roughly one decade following the railway's opening, an adjacent hotel was constructed with numerous facilities for visitors. The hotel complex was further expanded by its owner, ÖBB, shortly after the conclusion of World War II, and it remains an active and popular stop through to the present day.

During 1932, ownership of the Schafberg Railway was transferred to Osterreichisches Verkehrsbüro, which was subsequently taken over by Deutsche Reichsbahn six years later. In the aftermath of World War I, the line came under the control of ÖBB. In 2006 it was purchased by the City of Salzburg.

== Rolling stock ==
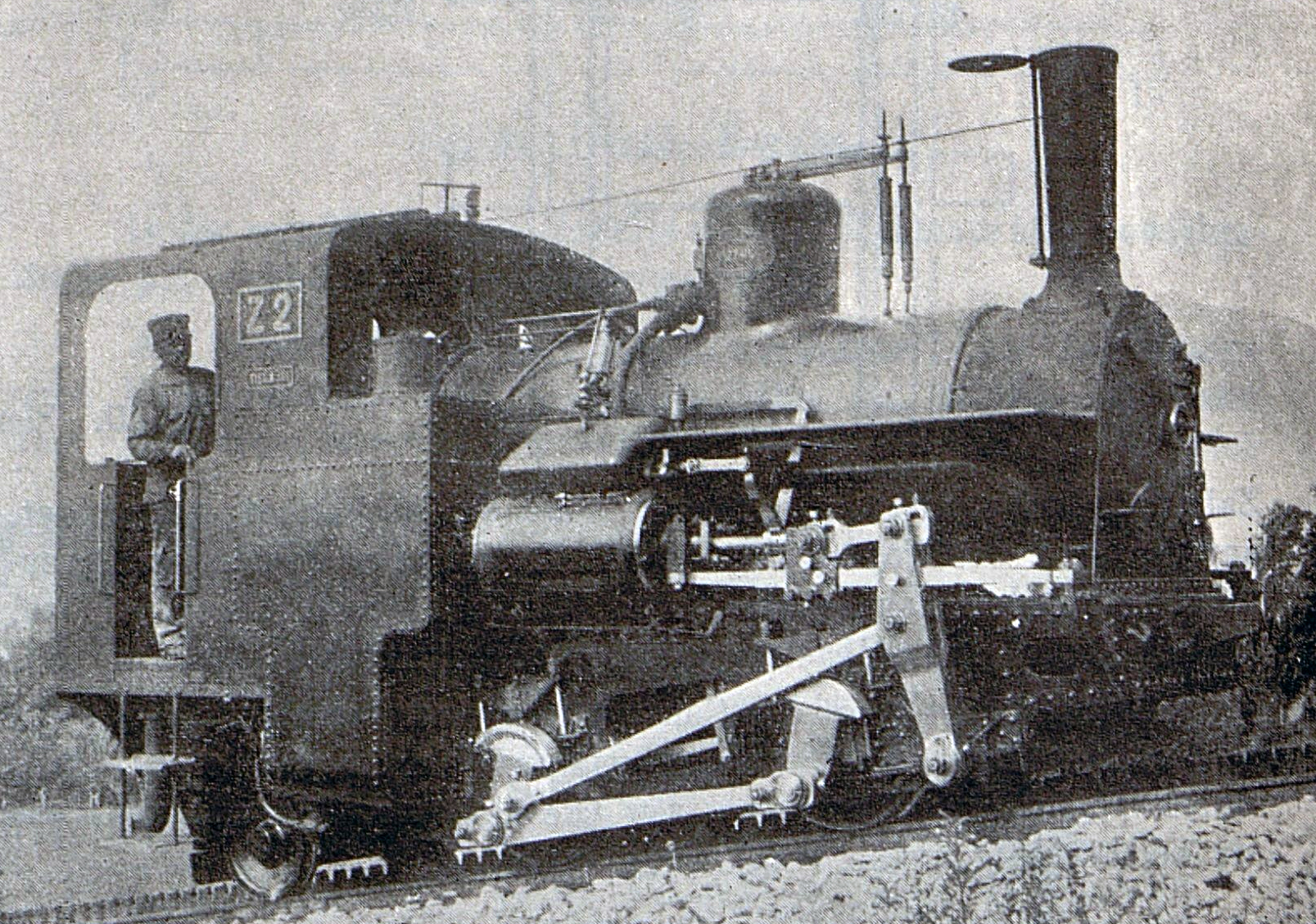
Schafbergbahn Locomotive Z2

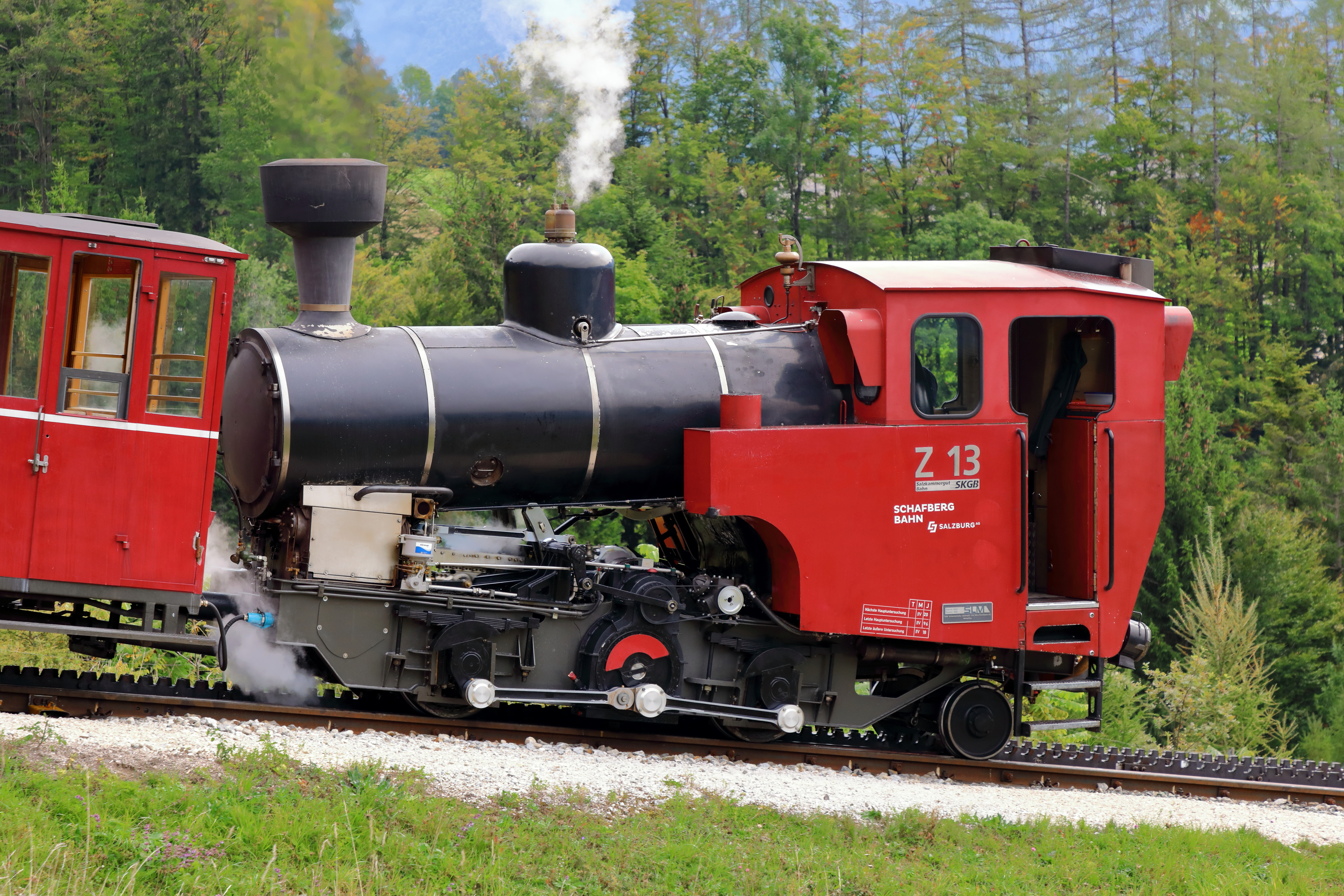
One of the four new steam locomotives (construction year 1995)

Traditionally, steam locomotives have been used upon the railway; all rolling stock is compatible with the line's Abt system. While diesel locomotives have been in use upon the Schafberg Railway since the 1960s, the railway's management has recognised the merit of continuing to operate steam traction with attracting tourists to the area; accordingly, during 1996, the Schafberg Railway took delivery of multiple new steam locomotives produced by SLM in Winterthur, Switzerland. These newer locomotives, unlike earlier units, have been designed to run on light oil instead of heavier diesel fuel, and can be operated by a single person.

As of 2016, the Schafberg Railway operates a fleet of steam locomotives (both oil and coal fired), two modern Stadler-manufactured diesel locomotives, and a single diesel railcar are in operation. While some of these are relatively recent units dating back to the 1990s, three of the locomotives date back to the earliest days of the Schafberg Railway and thus have been in regular operations for over a century. They are used on special heritage trains that are only run during the summer, while the bulk of the regular services are operated by the railway's oil-fired locomotives instead.

The steam hauled trains use a fleet of wooden-bodied coaches capable of carrying a maximum of 60 people, while the diesel railcar can transport up to 74 people in a single journey. The journey time between the base station and the summit station is 59 minutes when steam hauled, while a quicker time of 39 minutes can be achieve via diesel railcar. Lok 999.105 pushing a carriage up the railway featured in a short sequence for the 1965 musical feature film The Sound Of Music starring Julie Andrews. Several minutes of footage of the railway were included in the 1987 television movie Christmas with Flicka.

== Route ==
The lower station is located in the east of St. Wolfgang (in the state of Upper Austria), in front of Wolfgangsee. After leaving the town, and starting to climb the mountain, the line enters in the municipal territory of St. Gilgen, in the state of Salzburg. Nearest railway was the Salzkammergut-Lokalbahn Salzburg-Bad Ischl (closed in 1957), that counted a "St. Wolfgang" station in the opposite side of the lake, linked to Schafbergbahn's one with a ferry.

| Station | Km | Amsl | Notes |
|---|---|---|---|
| St. Wolfgang | 0.00 | 542 | lower station, train depot |
| Dorneralpe | 2.70 | 1,010 | water station, no passenger service |
| Schafbergalpe | 4.00 | 1,363 | guest house |
| Schafbergspitze | 5.85 | 1,732 | summit station, guest house |

== Gallery ==
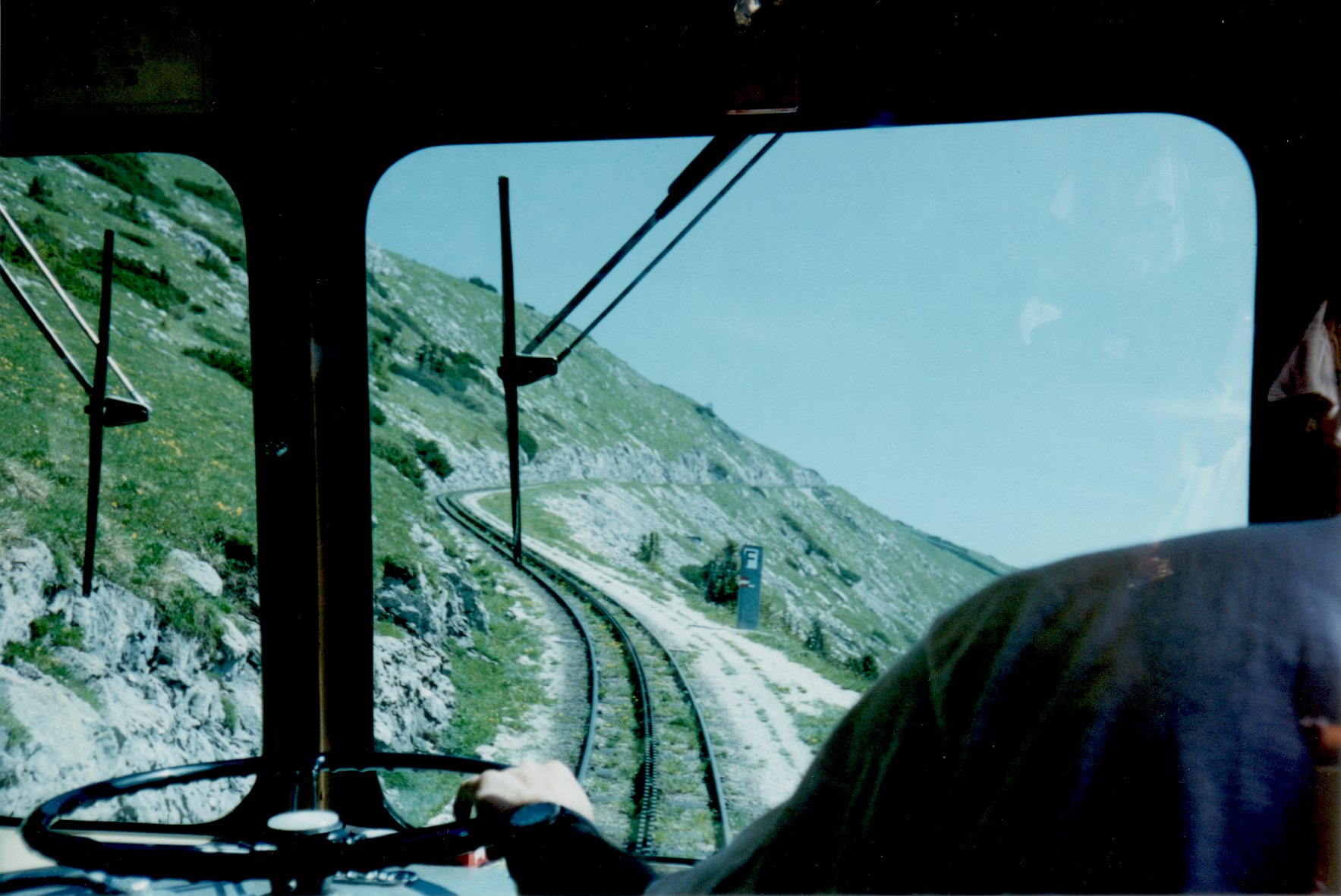
Going up Schafberg in a diesel railcar

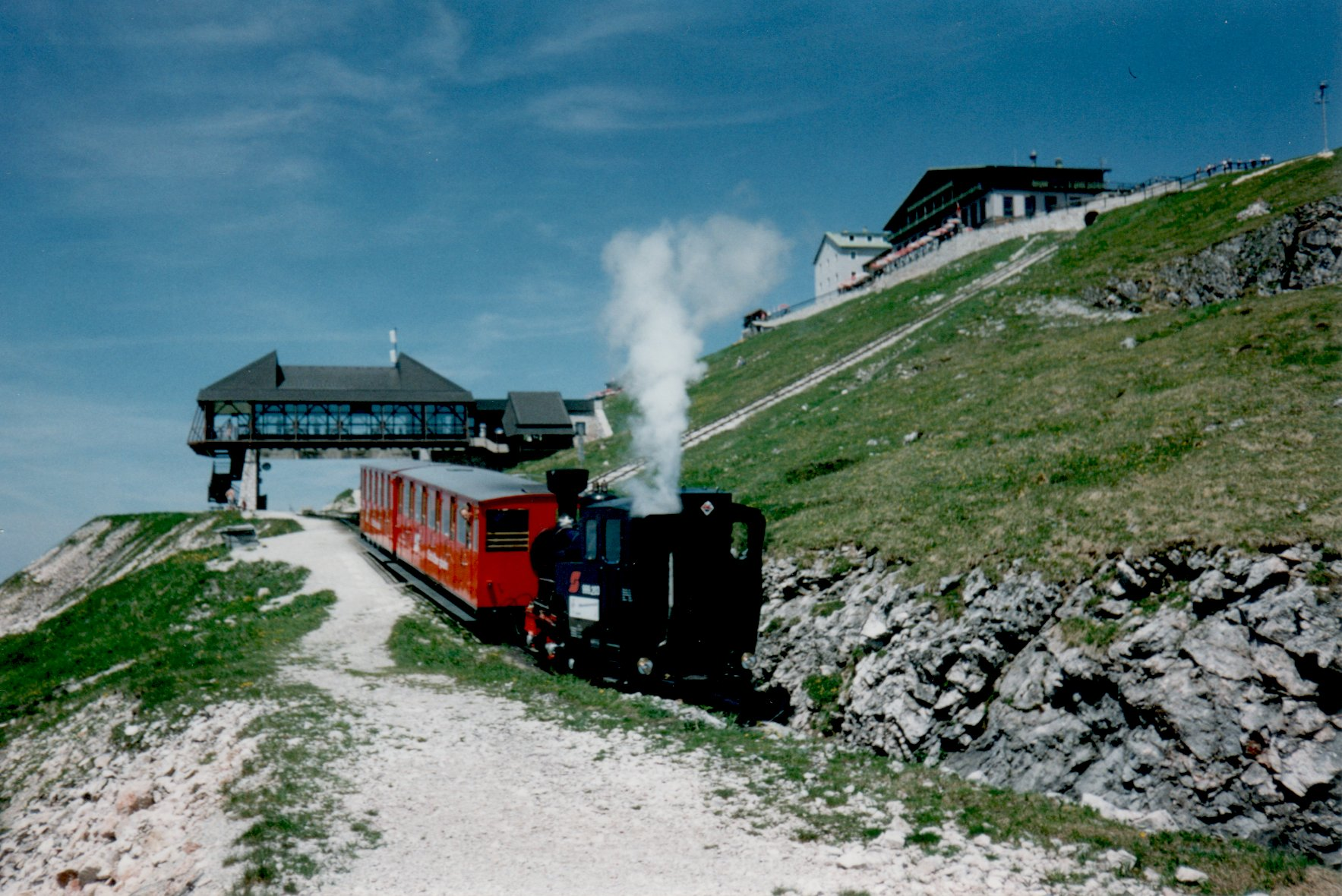
Schafberg Railway summit station

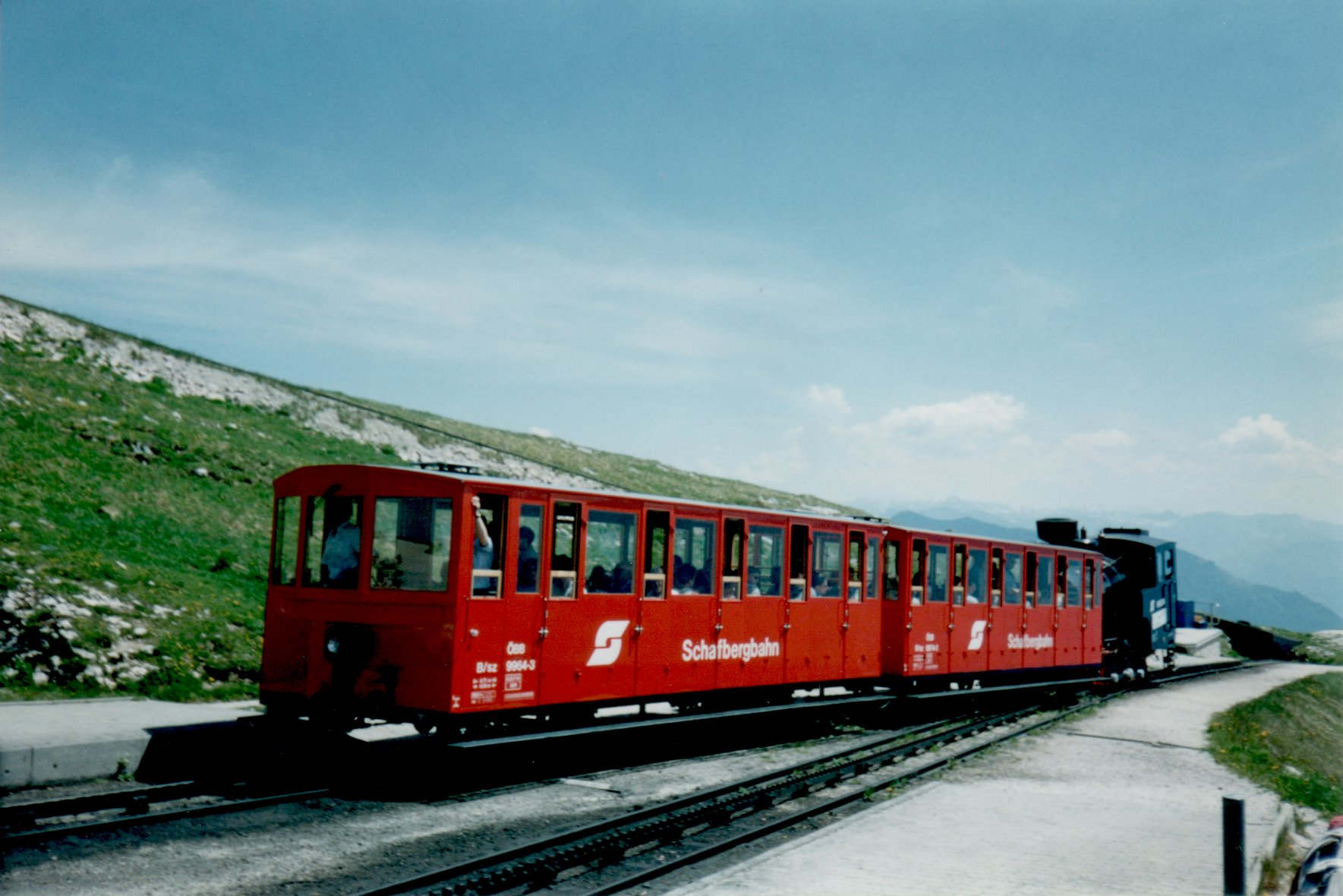
Schafberg Railway train outside the summit station

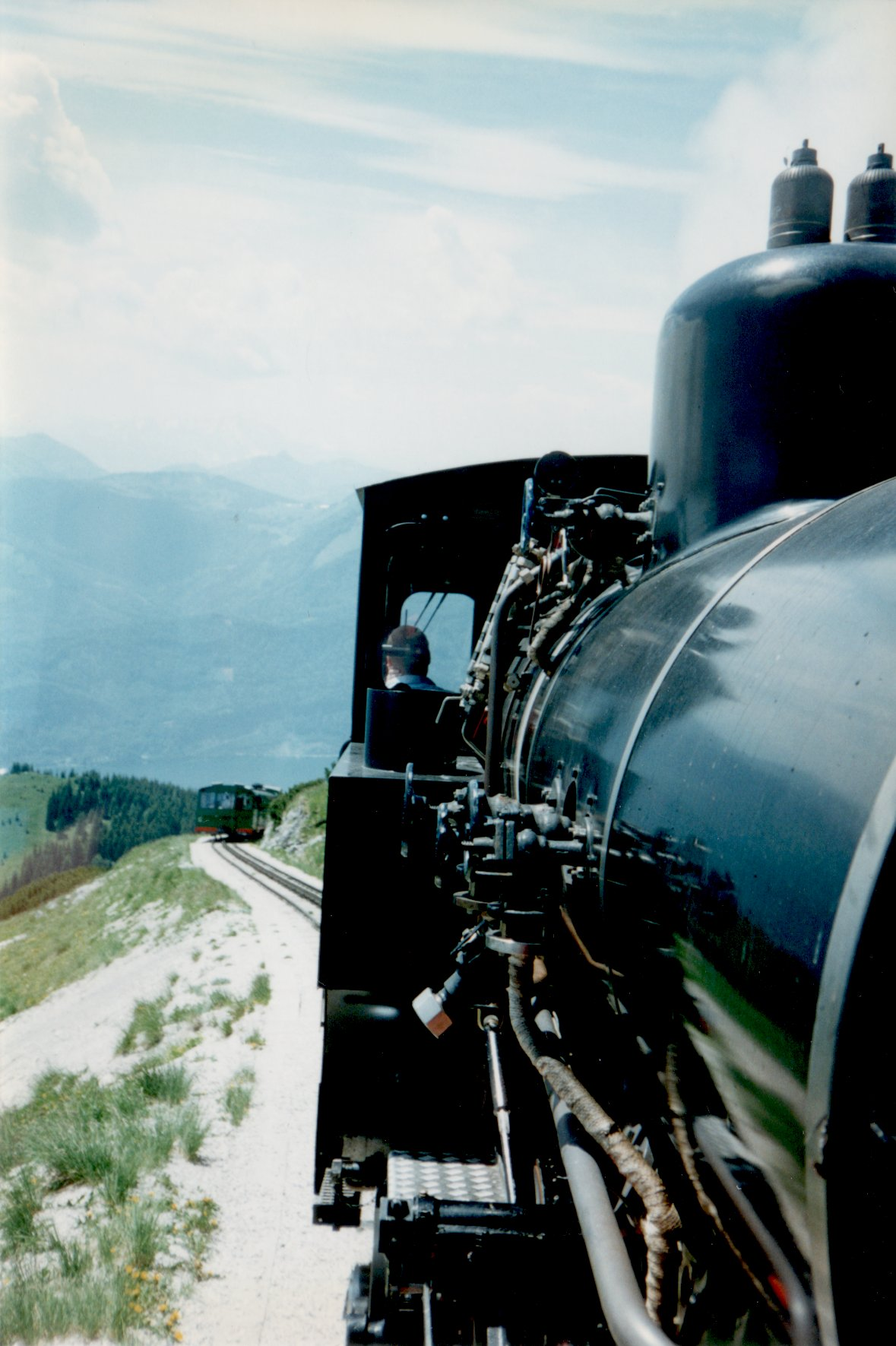
Schafberg Railway trains passing on the way down
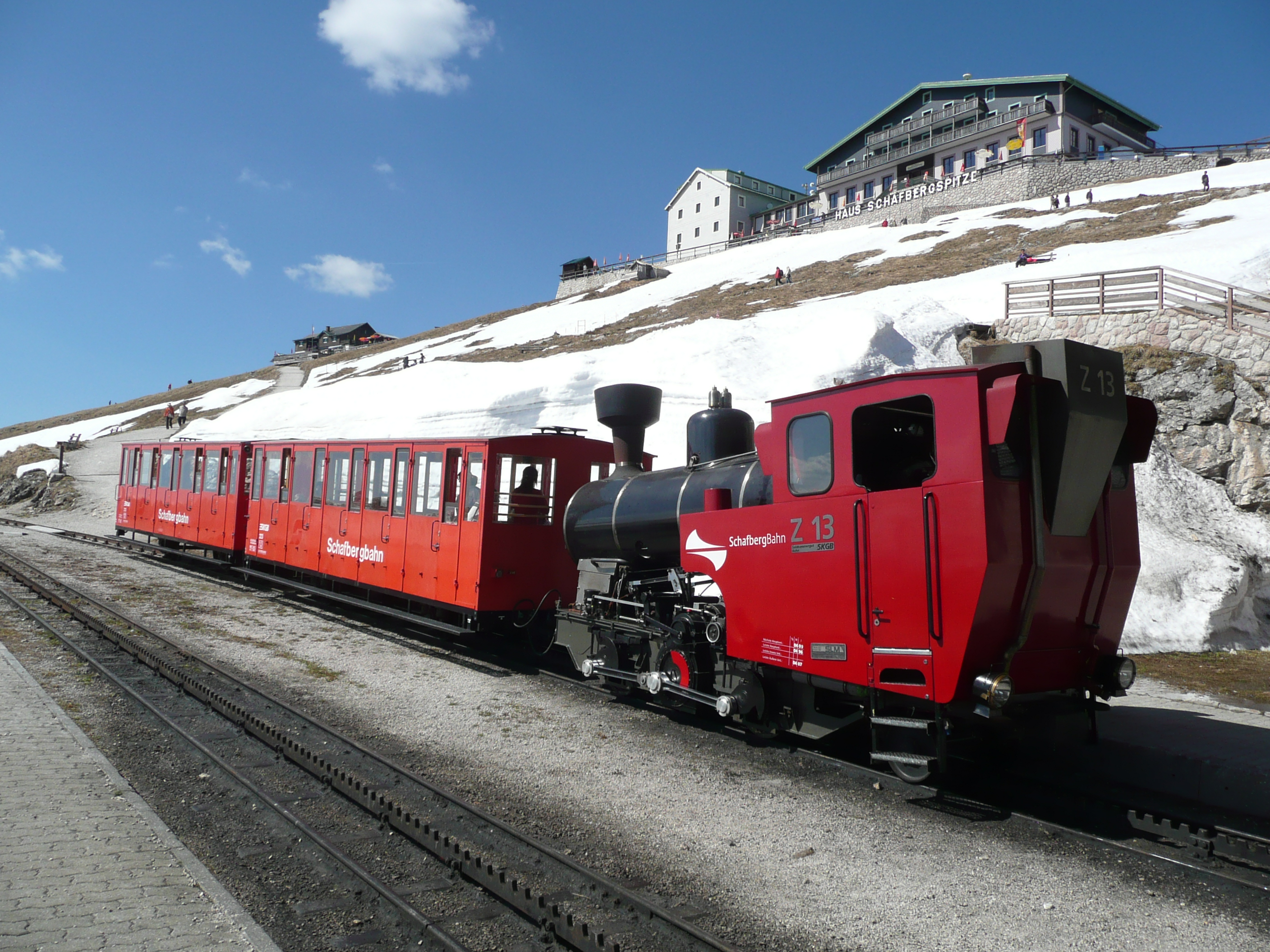
Locomotive Z13 at the summit station

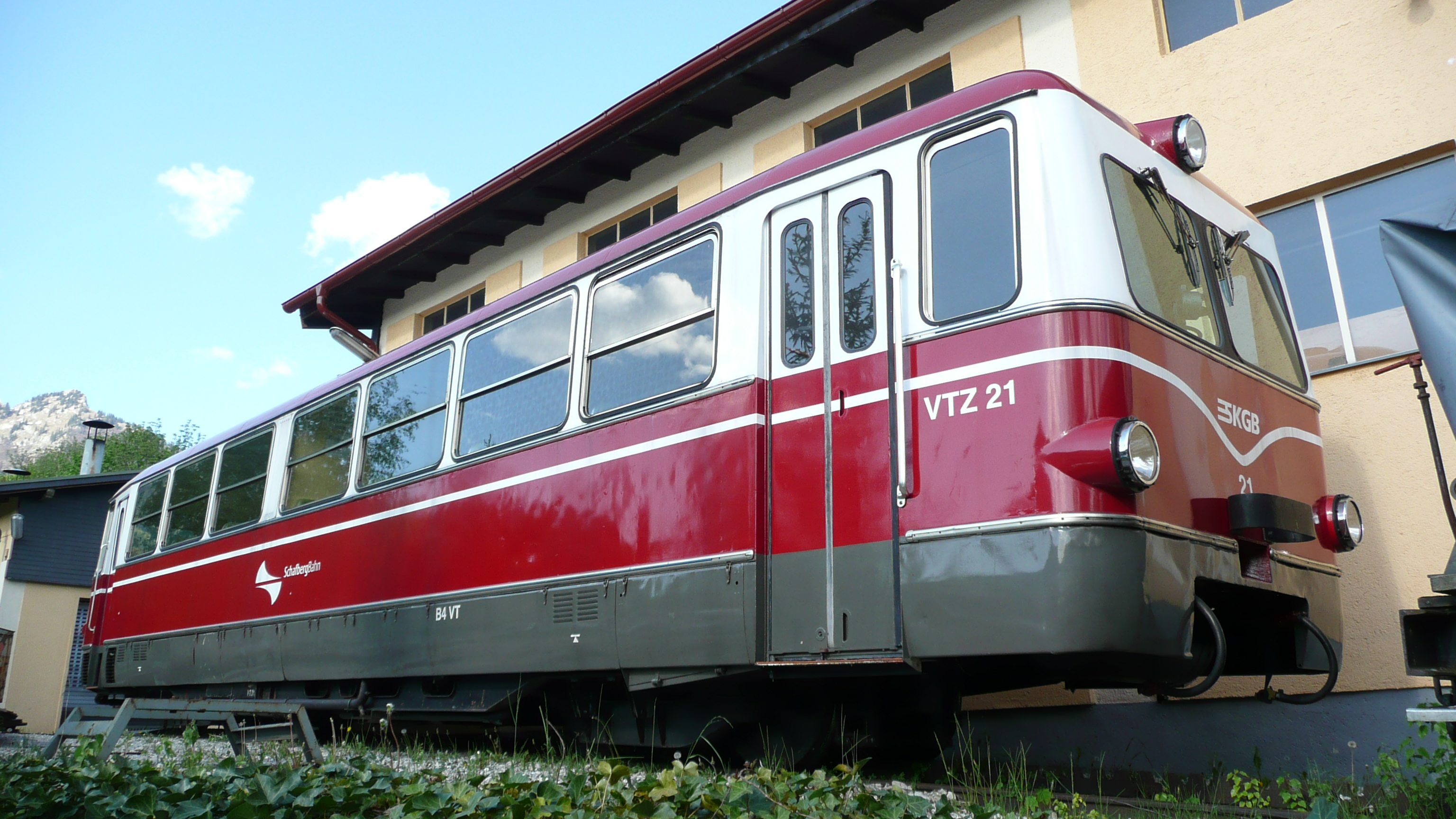
Diesel unit Z21 at St. Wolfgang

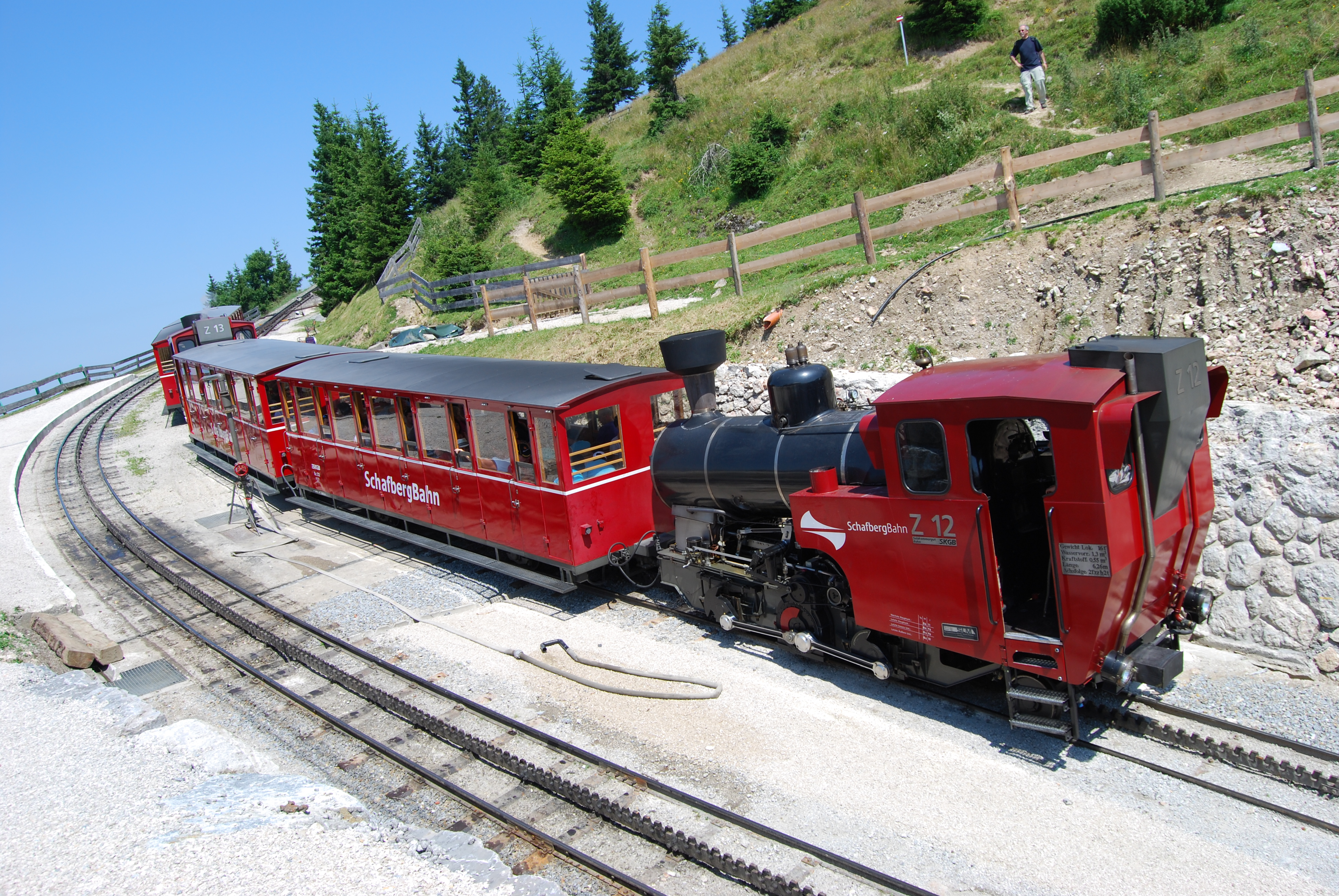
Z12 at Schafbergalpe station

Schafberg Railway 2008 video

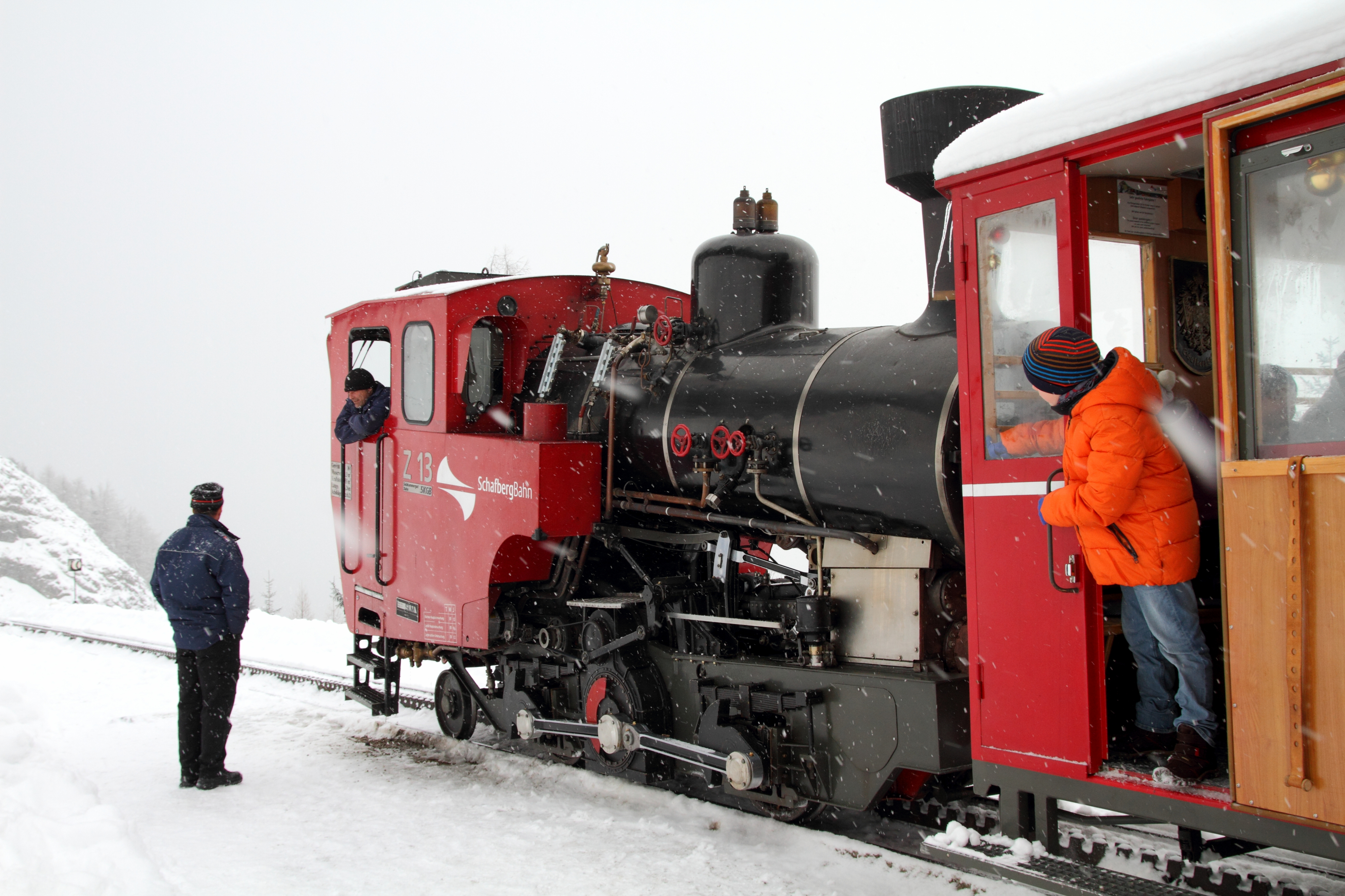
Schafbergbahn winter train with engine Z13 at Dorneralm loop

== Literature ==
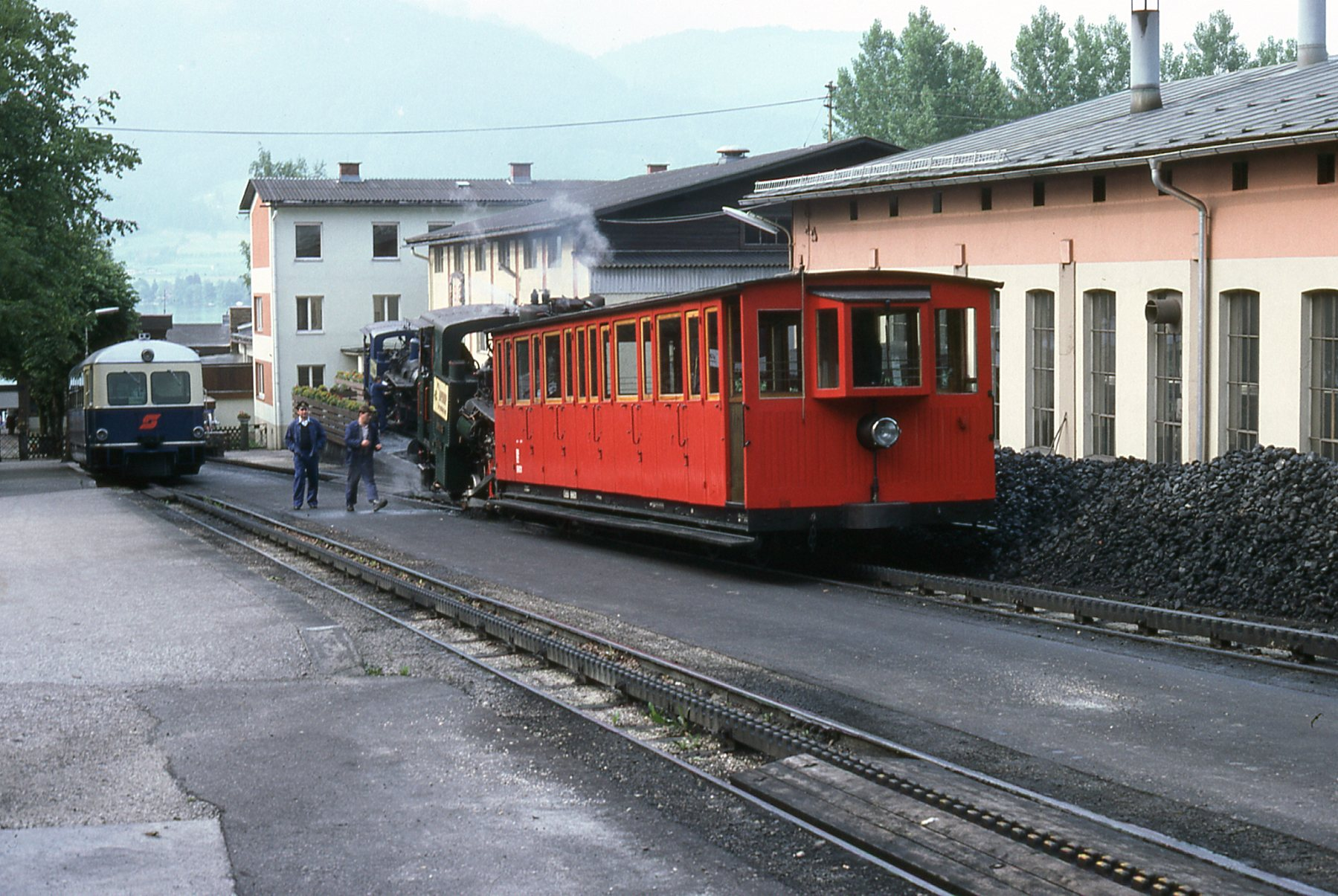
A 5099 railcar (ÖBB) and a steam train at St. Wolfgang station

- Gunter Mackinger: Schafbergbahn und Wolfgangseeschiffe. Verlag Kenning, Nordhorn, 2008 - ISBN 978-3-933613-92-9

== See also ==
- SKGLB Museum
- Eisenbahn-Romantik
- Christmas with Flicka
- List of highest railways in Europe
