= Patricia Birch =

American dancer, choreographer and film director (born 1934)

Patricia Ann Birch (born October 16, 1934) is an American dancer, choreographer, film director, and theatre director.

== Early life ==
Born in Englewood, New Jersey, Birch began her career as a dancer in Broadway musicals, including Brigadoon, Goldilocks, and West Side Story (playing Anybodys). She has directed and choreographed music videos for Cyndi Lauper, The Rolling Stones, and Carly Simon.

She earned Emmy Awards for her direction of the television specials Natalie Cole: Unforgettable and Celebrating Gershwin and, in collaboration with Michael Tilson Thomas, she staged the concert version of On the Town performed by both the London Symphony Orchestra and the San Francisco Symphony. She spent six years staging numbers for Saturday Night Live. In the 1960s, she taught dance at the Juilliard School's pre-college division in New York City. She performed as a soloist with Martha Graham and Agnes de Mille.

== Work ==
=== Film ===
- The Electric Company (1971)
- Savages (1973)
- The Wild Party (1975)
- Roseland (1977)
- A Little Night Music (1977)
- Grease (1978)
- Grease 2 (1982) also director
- Christmas with Flicka (1987)
- Big (1988)
- Elvira: Mistress of the Dark (1988)
- The Orchestra (fr. L'orchestre, 1989)
- Stella (1990)
- Billy Bathgate (1991)
- Sleeping with the Enemy (1991)
- This Is My Life (1992)
- Used People (1992)
- North (1994)
- The First Wives Club (1996)
- The Human Stain (2003)
- The Stepford Wives (2004)

=== Stage productions (selected) ===
All credits as choreographer unless otherwise noted

- West Side Story (1960 Broadway) (performer)
- The Me Nobody Knows (1970) (Musical Staging)
- You're a Good Man, Charlie Brown (1971 Broadway musical)
- Grease (1972 Broadway musical)
- A Little Night Music (1973 Broadway musical)
- Over Here! (1974 Broadway musical)
- Pacific Overtures (1976 Broadway musical)
- They're Playing Our Song (1979 Broadway musical)
- Zoot Suit (1981 Broadway play)
- Raggedy Ann (1986 Broadway musical also director)
- Anna Karenina (1992 Broadway musical)
- Band In Berlin (1999 Broadway musical)
- Candide (1997 Broadway musical)
- Parade (1998 Broadway musical)
- Lovemusik (2007 Broadway musical)

== Awards and nominations ==
Awards

- 1972 Drama Desk Award – Grease
- 1974 Drama Desk Award – Candide
- 2009 Induction into the American Theater Hall of Fame

Nominations

- 1972 Tony Award – Grease
- 1974 Tony Award – Over Here!
- 1976 Drama Desk Award – Pacific Overtures
- 1976 Tony Award – Pacific Overtures
- 1977 Drama Desk Award – Music Is
- 1977 Tony Award – Music Is
- 1999 Drama Desk Award – Parade
- 1999 Tony Award – Parade
- 2007 Drama Desk Award – LoveMusik
