= St. Wolfgang im Salzkammergut =

- Municipality
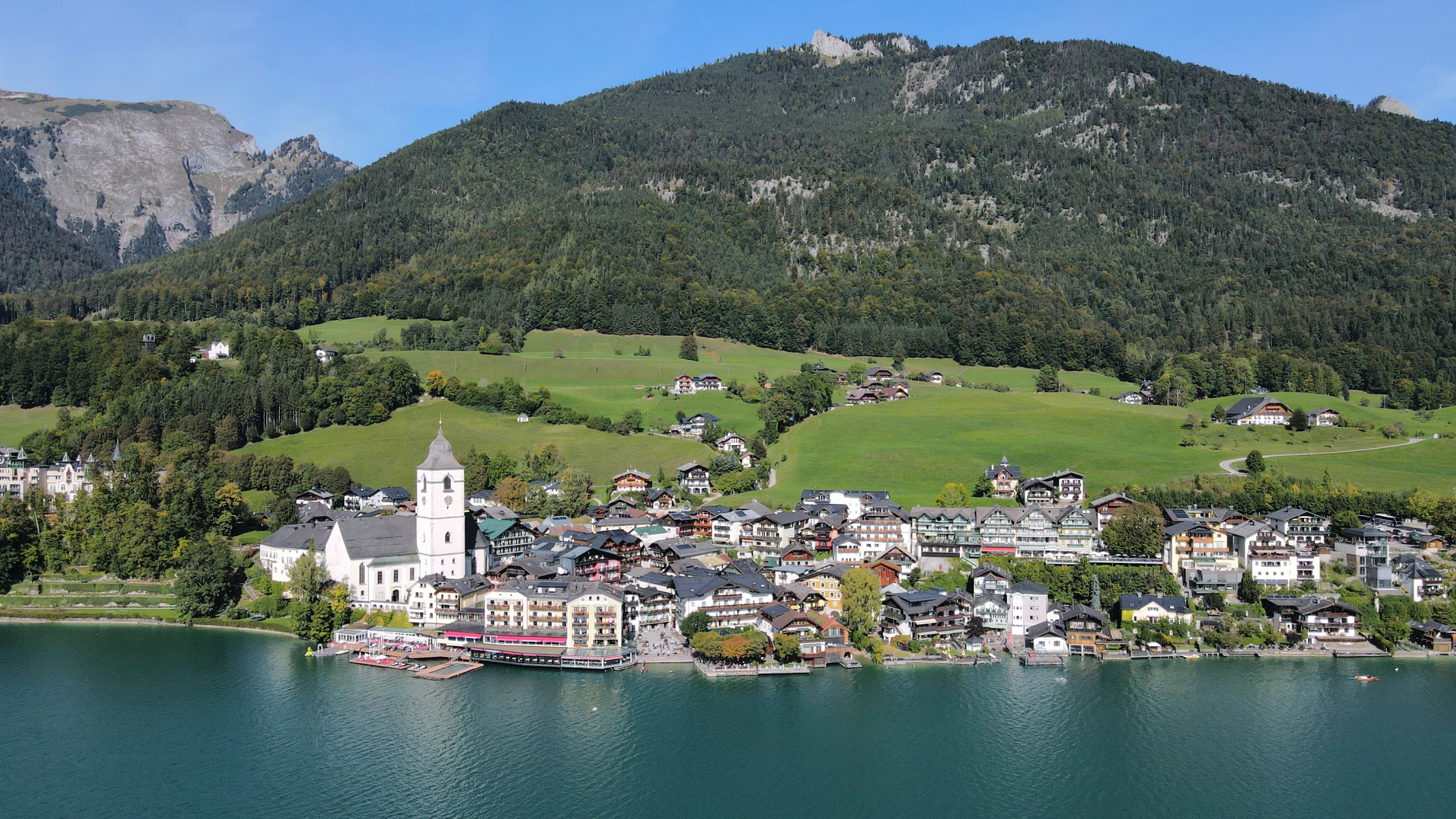
- Southwest view of St. Wolfgang im Salzkammergut

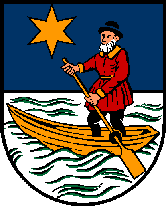
- Coat of arms

- Location within Austria
- Coordinates: 47°44′18″N 13°26′53″E
- Country: Austria
- State: Upper Austria
- District: Gmunden

Government
  - Mayor: Eisl Franz (ÖVP)

Area
  - Total: 56.57 km^{2} (21.84 sq mi)
- Elevation: 548 m (1,798 ft)

Population (2018-01-01)
  - Total: 2,770
  - Density: 49.0/km^{2} (127/sq mi)
- Time zone: UTC+1 (CET)
  - Summer (DST): UTC+2 (CEST)
- Postal code: 5360
- Area code: 06138
- Vehicle registration: GM
- Website: www.st-wolfgang.ooe.gv.at

St. Wolfgang im Salzkammergut is a market town in central Austria, in the Salzkammergut region of Upper Austria, named after Saint Wolfgang of Regensburg.

== Geography ==
The town is located in central Austria. It is on the northern shore of the Wolfgangsee lake (close to the towns of Strobl and St. Gilgen, both in the State of Salzburg) at the foot of the Schafberg mountain.

=== Populated places ===
The municipality of St. Wolfgang in Salzkammergut consists of the following cadastral communities: St. Wolfgang (2,337.24 ha) and Wolfgangthal (3,319.61 ha); while further subdivided into twelve populated places (with population in brackets as of 1 January 2024).

- Aschau (34)
- Au (378)
- Bürglstein (3)
- Graben (183)
- Markt (598)
- Mönichsreith (95)
- Radau (338)
- Rußbach (321)
- Schwarzenbach (213)
- Weinbach (339)
- Windhag (214)
- Wirling (181)

== Culture ==
St. Wolfgang's tourist attractions include the Schafbergbahn (a rack railway that runs up the Schafberg), the Hotel Weißes Rössl (the setting of the play The White Horse Inn and the 1930 operetta based on the play) and a pilgrimage church with a late Gothic altarpiece by Michael Pacher. The railway and the church are among the many St. Wolfgang locations featured in Christmas with Flicka, a 1987 American-Austrian television film starring the operatic mezzo-soprano Frederica von Stade, which was shot entirely in the town and its environs. (As well as being shown on America's PBS, the film was released on VHS, Laserdisc and DVD.)

A destination spa, St. Wolfgang is also a popular winter skiing resort.

== History ==
Saint Wolfgang erected the first church at the shore of the Wolfgangsee after he withdrew to the nearby Mondsee Abbey in 976. According to legend he threw an axe down the mountain to find the site and even persuaded the Devil to contribute to the building by promising him the soul of the first living being ever to enter the church. However Satan was disappointed as the first creature over the doorstep was a wolf. After Wolfgang's canonization in 1052, the church became a major pilgrimage site, as it was first mentioned in an 1183 deed by Pope Lucius III. In 1481 it was furnished with the famous Pacher polyptych. There had been several places for lodging around the church since medieval times, while the Weißes Rössl hotel was not built until 1878.

During World War II, a subcamp of the Dachau concentration camp was located here.

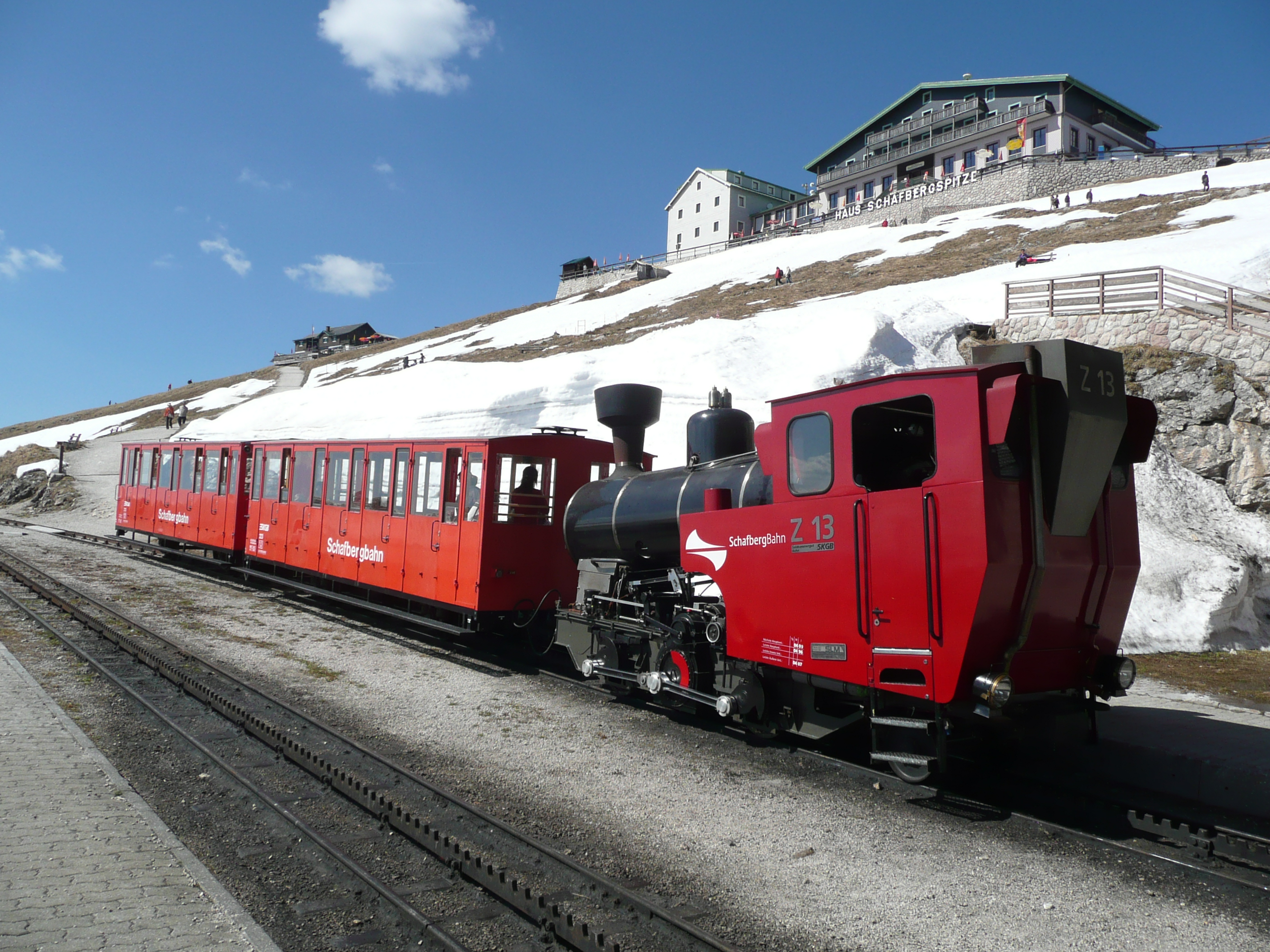
Schafbergbahn

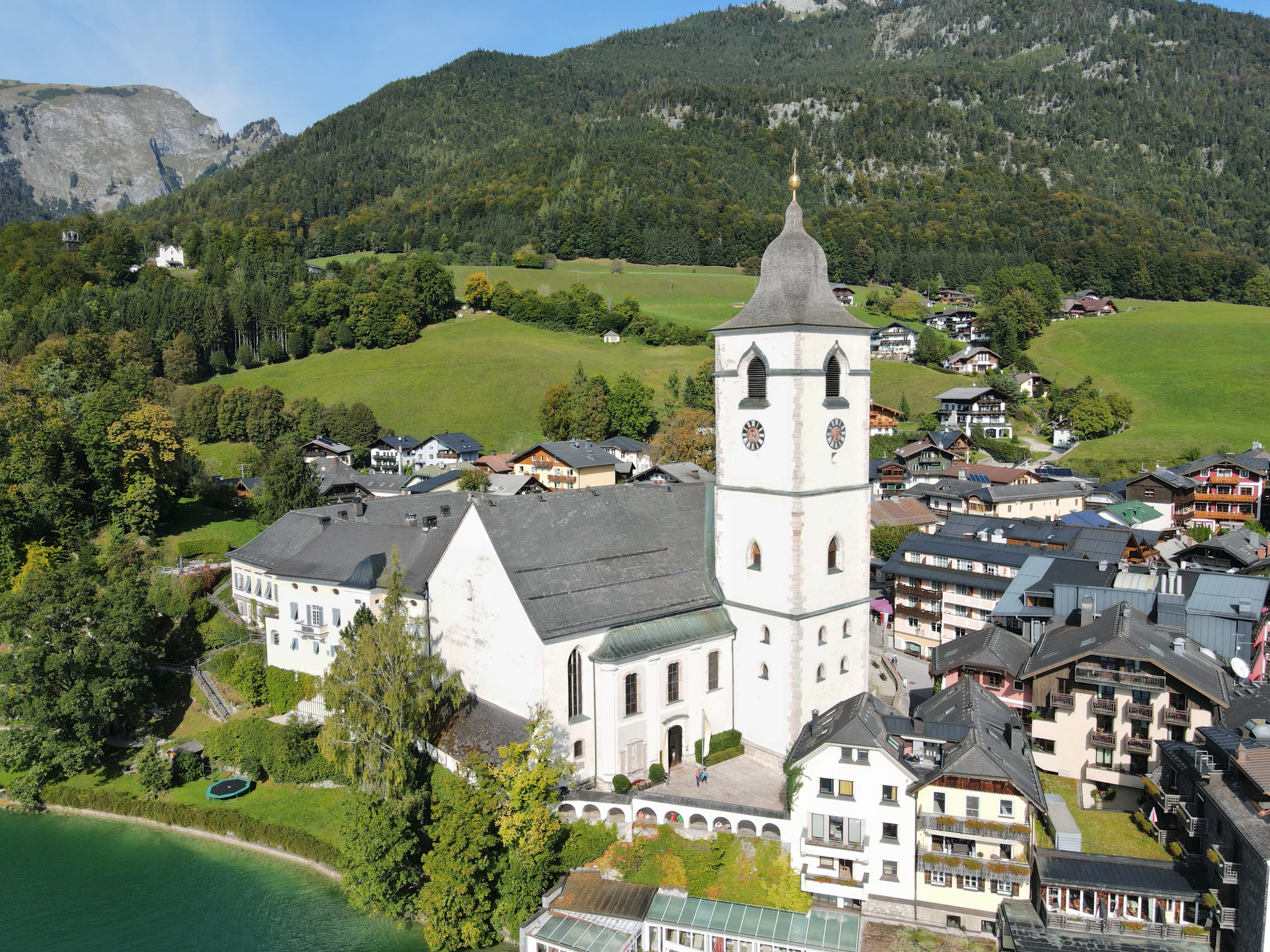
Parish church St. Wolfgang

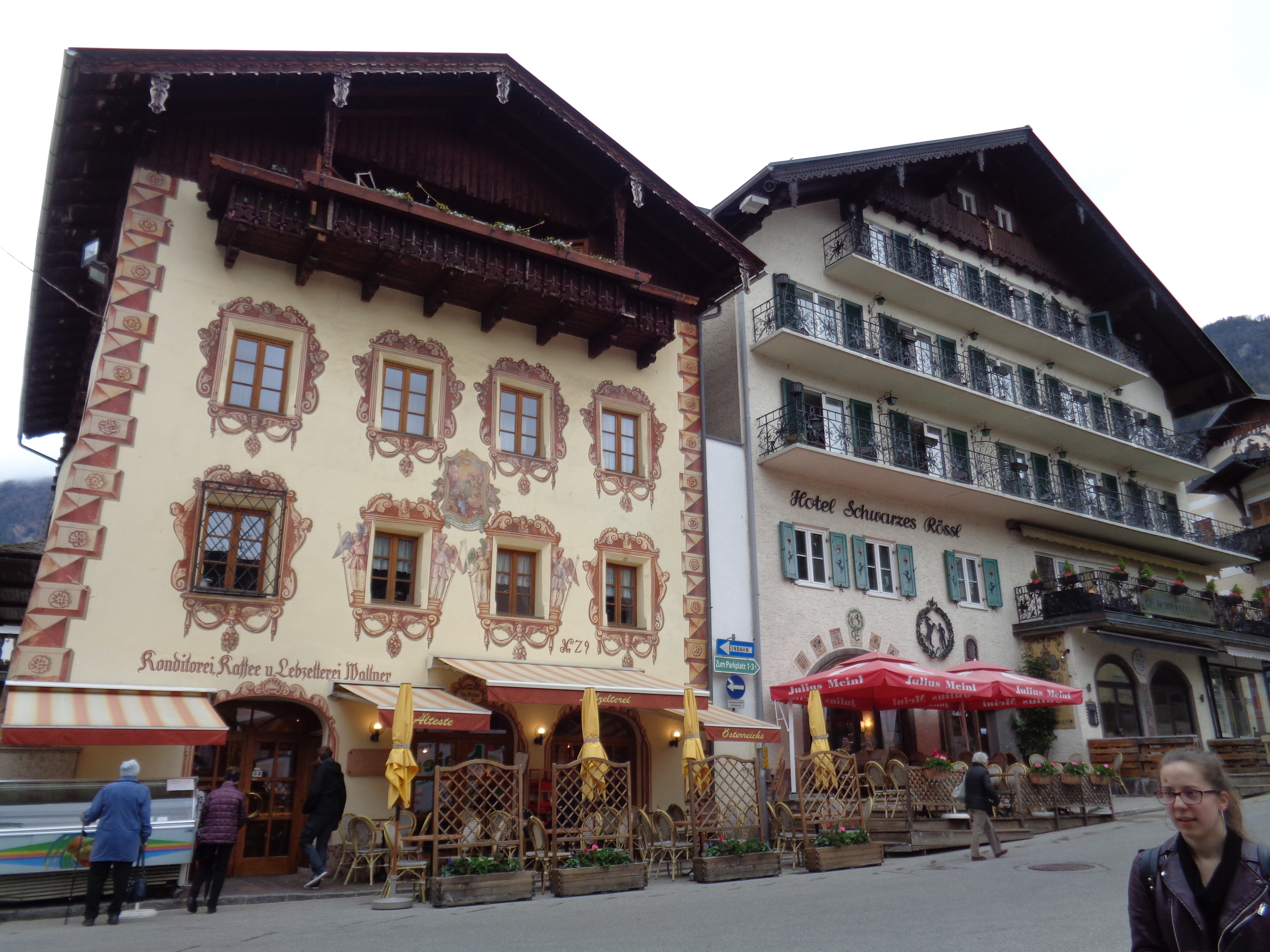
Buildings in the town centre

== Transport ==
St. Wolfgang can be reached via a branch of the B 158 Wolfgangsee Straße federal highway (Bundesstraße), running from the city of Salzburg to Bad Ischl.

== See also ==
- Schafbergbahn
- Schafberg
- Wolfgangsee
- Christmas with Flicka
