= The Orchestra (film) =

The Orchestra (Polish: Orkiestra) is a 1990 film directed by Zbigniew Rybczyński.

It is a phantasmagoric work, filled with symbols and cultural references. It presents the fate of a man whose life and death constitute an inseparable and coherent whole: in the opening and closing scenes of the film, a hearse appears. According to Tadeusz Sobolewski: "The way of presenting the fate of a man as a whole, in one image, brings to mind medieval or Renaissance allegories." The film also contains references to communist systems and the inevitable fall of each of them.

The entire Orchestra consists of six smoothly successive sequences, each of which takes place in a different place and is illustrated by one of the famous compositions, respectively:

Mozart's Piano Concerto No. 21, Fryderyk Chopin's Funeral March, Tomaso Albinoni's Adagio, Rossini's The Thieving Magpie, Franz Schubert's Ave Maria, Maurice Ravel's Boléro.

The film was produced in the HDTV system, in the director's own studio, Zbig Vision Studio in Hoboken near New York. Thanks to the devices that Rybczyński himself constructed, he was able to obtain the effect of flowing, rotating spaces. The choreography was authored by Patricia Birch.

For the needs of the Orchestra, in addition to those in the studio, shots were taken in the Louvre, Chartres Cathedral and the Garnier Opera.

== Awards ==
- 1990 – Emmy Award for Outstanding Achievement in Special Effects
- 1990, Palermo – Prix Italia for Arts
- 1990, Tokyo-Montreux – IECF, Special Award
- 1990, Tokyo – Hi Vision Award
- 1991, Tokyo – A.V.A. Festival, Grand Prix
