= Julius Rudel =

American opera and orchestra conductor

External audio
- You may hear Julius Rudel with Jorge Bolet and the Lewisohn Stadium Symphony Orchestra of New York in: Rachmaninoff's Piano Concerto No. 3 in D minor, Op. 30; Mozart's Symphony No. 35 in D major K. 385 ("The Hoffner"); Modest Mussorgsky's Pictures at an Exhibition in 1957; Here on wnyc.org

Julius Rudel (6 March 1921 – 26 June 2014) was an Austrian-born American opera and orchestra conductor. He was born in Vienna and was a student at the city's Academy of Music. He immigrated to the United States at the age of 17 in 1938 after the country was annexed by Germany.

He studied conducting at the Mannes College of Music in New York City. After completing his music studies, he joined the New York City Opera. He died on 26 June 2014 at the age of 93.

== Career ==
After 1944, Rudel began a 35-year career with the New York City Opera that continued until 1979. After rising to principal conductor and general director in 1957, he brought the company international acclaim with his innovative programming (including three seasons of all-American operas in 1958, 1959, and 1960), and formed a partnership with Beverly Sills, who became the leading soprano of the NYCO. He led the company to its new home at the New York State Theater in Lincoln Center, where it opened in February 1966 with Alberto Ginastera's Don Rodrigo, in which he cast an unknown 25-year-old tenor, Plácido Domingo.

In 1953, he conducted the Naumburg Orchestral Concerts, in the Naumburg Bandshell, Central Park, in the summer series.

Rudel was a National Patron of Delta Omicron, an international professional music fraternity.

In 1979, Julius Rudel became the music director of the Buffalo Philharmonic Orchestra. Though faced with many financial constraints, Rudel's tenure was marked with emphasis on the classical repertoire as well as gala performances with Beverly Sills and Plácido Domingo. Rudel also took the BPO on a West Coast tour and made a commemorative recording with CBS Masterworks of music for the holiday season.

In 2009 he was honored by the US National Endowment for the Arts for his many contributions to opera. He died in Manhattan on 26 June 2014.

== Recordings ==
Audio

- Floyd: The Sojourner and Mollie Sinclair (Neway, Treigle; 1963) [live] VAI
- Handel: Giulio Cesare (Sills, Wolff, Forrester, Treigle; 1967) RCA Victor
- Ginastera: Bomarzo (Novoa; 1967) Columbia Records
- Massenet: Manon (Sills, Gedda, Souzay, Bacquier; 1970) Westminster
- Offenbach: Les contes d'Hoffmann (Sills, Marsee, Burrows, Treigle; 1972) Westminster
- Donizetti: Anna Bolena (Sills, Verrett, Burrows, Plishka; 1972) Westminster
- Bellini: I puritani (Sills, Gedda, L.Quilico, Plishka; 1973) Westminster
- Boito: Mefistofele (Caballé, Domingo, Treigle; 1973) EMI
- Massenet: Thaïs (Moffo, Carreras, Bacquier, Díaz; 1974) RCA
- Charpentier: Louise (Sills, Gedda, van Dam; 1977) EMI
- Lehár: Die lustige Witwe: excerpts (Sills, H.Price, Titus; 1978) EMI
- Massenet: Cendrillon (Welting, von Stade, Gedda; 1978) CBS
- Verdi: Rigoletto (Sills, Kraus, Milnes, Ramey; 1978) EMI
- Weill: Der Silbersee (Grey; 1980) Nonesuch

Video

- Donizetti: Roberto Devereux (Sills, Marsee, J.Alexander, Fredricks; Capobianco, 1975) [live] VAI
- Verdi: La traviata (Sills, H.Price, Fredricks; Capobianco, 1976) [live] VAI
- Massenet: Manon (Sills, H.Price, Fredricks, Ramey; Capobianco, 1977) [live] Paramount
- Saint-Saëns: Samson et Dalila (Verrett, Domingo, Brendel; Joël, 1981) [live] Kultur
- Giordano: Andrea Chénier (Tomowa-Sintow, Domingo, Zancanaro; Hampe, 1985) [live] Kultur

== See also ==
- Massenet: Cendrillon (Julius Rudel recording)
- Christmas with Flicka (television movie)

Cultural offices
Preceded by Walter Hendl	Music Director, Caramoor Festival; 1962–1976	Succeeded by John Nelson
Preceded by Michael Tilson Thomas	Music Director, Buffalo Philharmonic; 1979–1985	Succeeded by Semyon Bychkov
