= Schafberg (Salzkammergut) =

Mountain in Salzburg, Austria

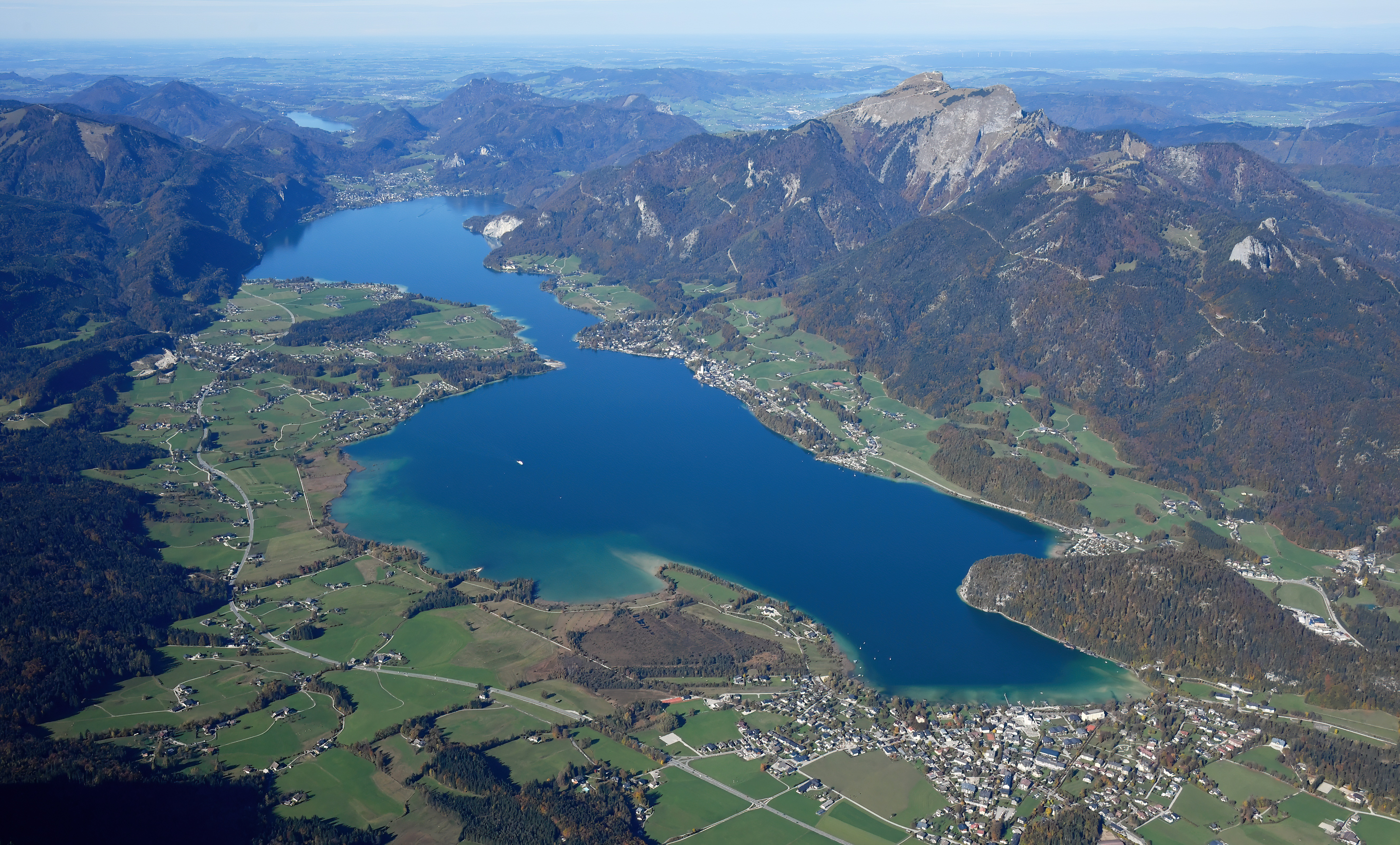
- Schafberg and Wolfgangsee

Highest point
- Elevation: 1,783 m (5,850 ft)
- Prominence: 1,178 m (3,865 ft)
- Coordinates: 47°46′35″N 13°26′02″E

Geography
- Location within Alps
- Location: Salzburg, Austria
- Parent range: Salzkammergut Mountains

Schafberg (1,783 m) is a mountain in the Austrian state of Salzburg. Situated within the Salzkammergut Mountains range of the Northern Limestone Alps, the Schafberg rises at the shore of Wolfgangsee Lake.

== Tourism ==
During the summer, the Schafbergbahn, a rack railway that opened in 1893, runs from the small town of St. Wolfgang im Salzkammergut on the shores of the Wolfgangsee to the summit. The peak offers a panoramic view of the Salzkammergut mountains and its lakes and is also the site of a hotel called Schafbergspitze, established in 1862.

== Gallery ==
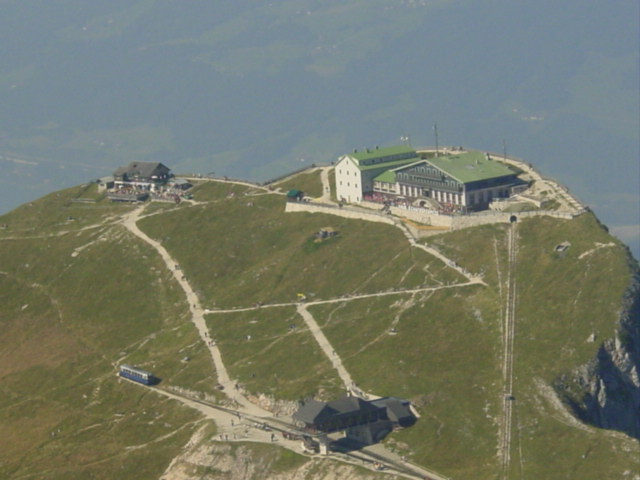
Schafbergspitze

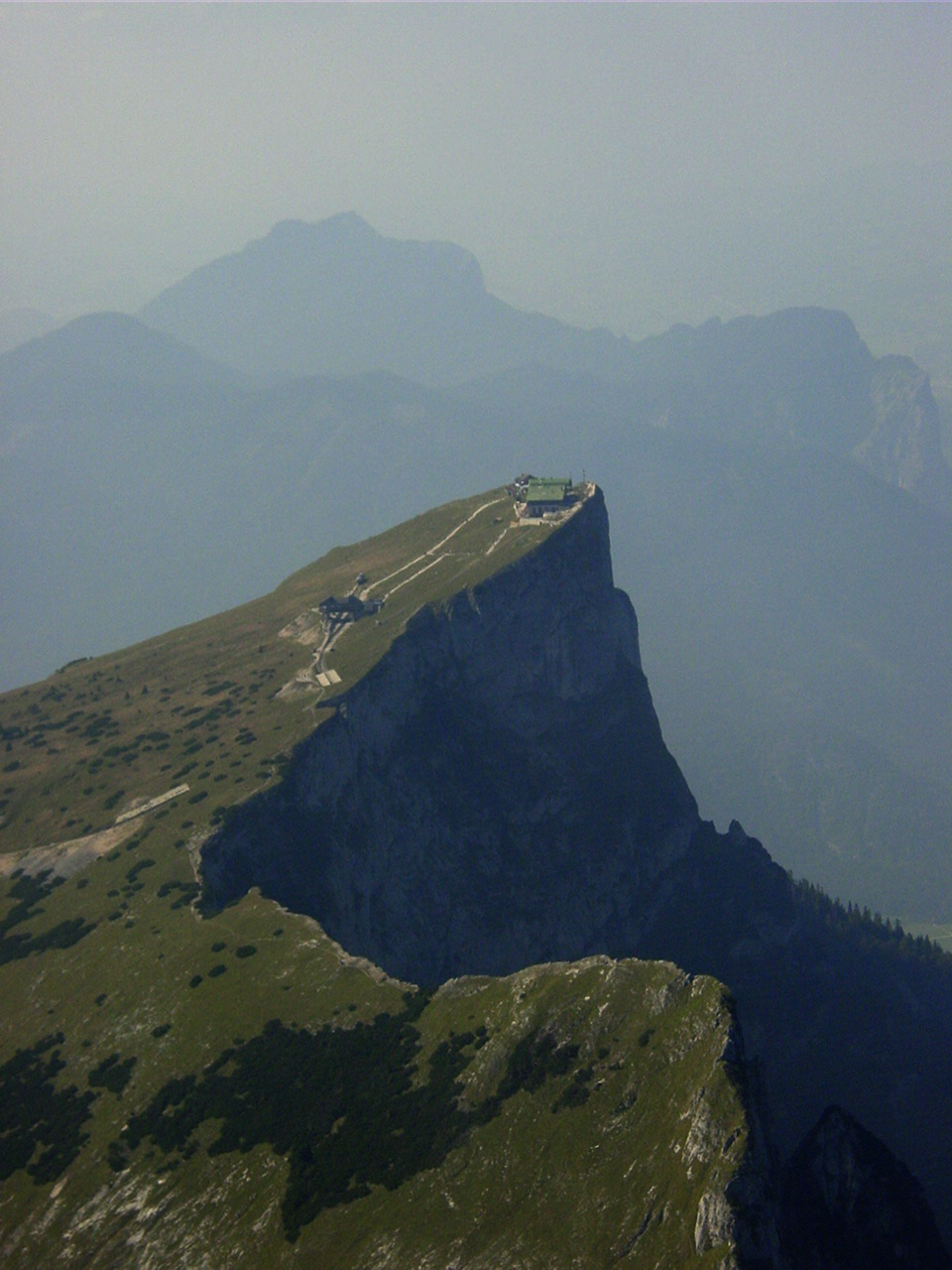
Aerial view of the summit

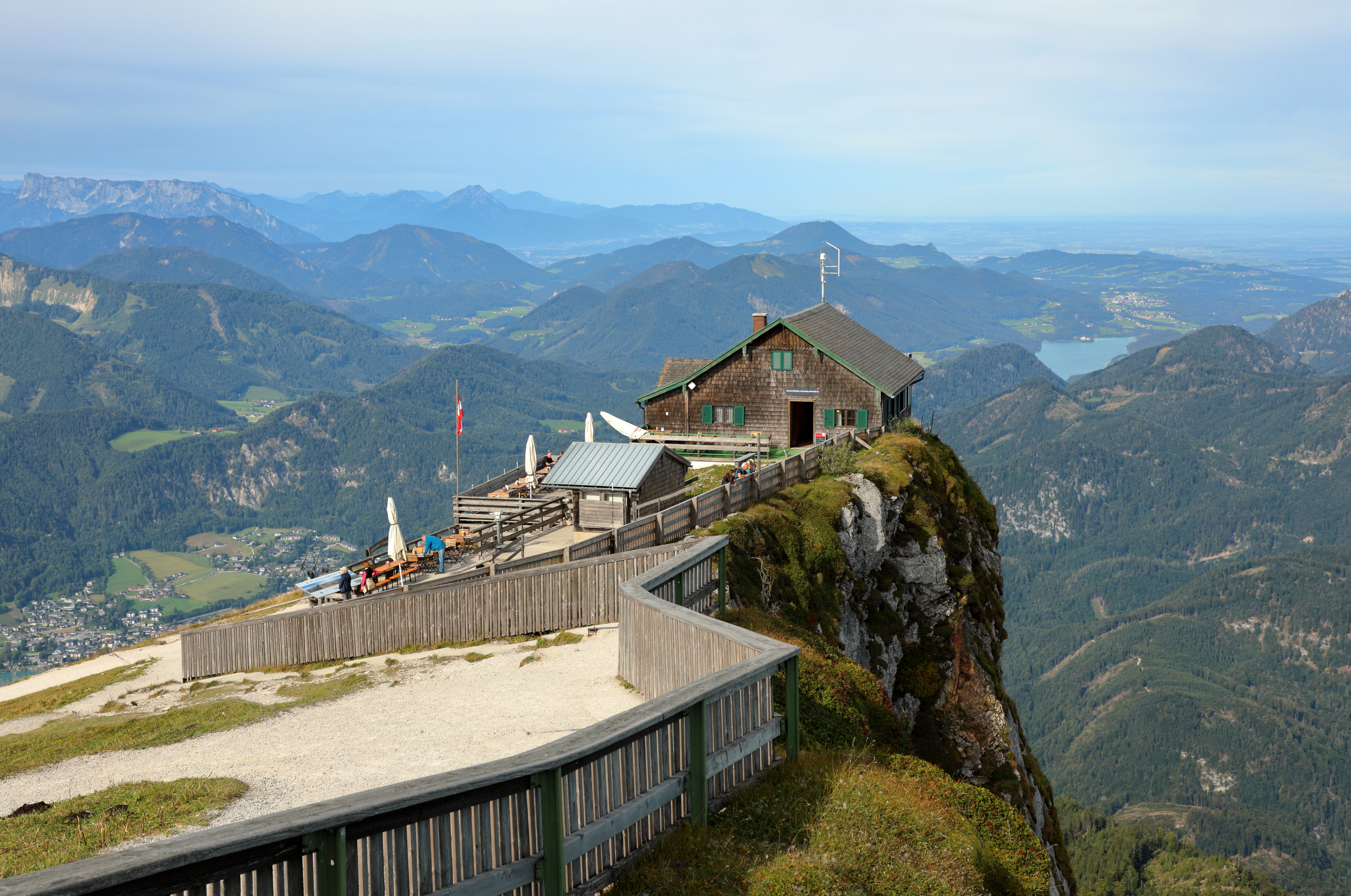
Tavern at the summit
