= Brunetti =

Brunetti is a surname and may refer to:

== People ==
- Antonio Brunetti (1744–1786), Italian violinist
- Argentina Brunetti (1907–2005), Argentine actress and writer
- August Brunetti-Pisano (1870–1943), Austrian composer
- Dana Brunetti (born 1973), co-founder and Chief Content Officer of Cavalry Media
- Dominic Brunetti (born 1977), American politician
- Enrico Brunetti (1862–1927), British musician and entomologist
- Erik Brunetti (born 1967), American designer and founder of the clothing brand FUCT
- Federica Brunetti (born 1988), Italian professional basketball player
- Gaetano Brunetti (1744–1798), prolific Italian composer
- Gianluca Brunetti (born 1962), Italian Secretary General of the European Economic and Social Committee
- Giovan Gualberto Brunetti (1706–1787), Italian composer
- Ivan Brunetti (born 1967), Italian-American cartoonist
- Lodovico Brunetti (1813–1899), Italian inventor of the first modern crematory (1873)
- Mara Brunetti (born 1976), Italian former synchronized swimmer
- Melvin T. Brunetti (1933–2009), U.S. judge, Court of Appeals for the Ninth Circuit
- Octavio Brunetti (1975–2014), Argentine pianist
- Orazio Brunetti (XVII century), Italian engraver and painter, active mainly in Rome
- Rita Brunetti (1890–1942), Italian physicist
- Sebastiano Brunetti (died 1649), Italian painter active in his native Bologna
- Susana Brunetti (1941–1974), Argentine actress
- Therese Brunetti née Frey (1782–1864), Czech stage actor and ballet dancer

== Fictional entities ==
- Commissario Guido Brunetti, protagonist of Donna Leon's series of crime novels set in Venice, Italy and his family

== See also ==
- Bruni (disambiguation)
- Iancu v. Brunetti, pending U.S. Supreme Court case on the registration of trademarks
