= Bruno =

Bruno may refer to:

== People and fictional characters ==
- Bruno (name), including lists of people and fictional characters with either the given name or surname
- Bruno, Duke of Saxony (died 880)
- Bruno the Great (925–965), Archbishop of Cologne, Duke of Lotharingia and saint
- Bruno (bishop of Verden) (920–976), German Roman Catholic bishop
- Pope Gregory V (c. 972–999), born Bruno of Carinthia
- Bruno of Querfurt (c. 974–1009), Christian missionary bishop, martyr and saint
- Bruno of Augsburg (c. 992–1029), Bishop of Augsburg
- Bruno (bishop of Würzburg) (1005–1045), German Roman Catholic bishop
- Pope Leo IX (1002–1054), born Bruno of Egisheim-Dagsburg
- Bruno II (1024–1057), Frisian count or margrave
- Bruno the Saxon (fl. 2nd half of the 11th century), historian
- Saint Bruno of Cologne (d. 1101), founder of the Carthusians
- Bruno (bishop of Segni) (c. 1045–1123), Italian Roman Catholic bishop and saint
- Bruno (archbishop of Trier) (died 1124), German Roman Catholic bishop
- Bruno II of Berg (c. 1100–1137), Archbishop of Cologne and chips
- Bruno (footballer, born 1970), full name Bruno Alexandre Vaza Ferreira, Portuguese former footballer
- Bruno (footballer, born 1980), full name Bruno Saltor Grau, Spanish former footballer
- Bruno (footballer, born 1984), full name Bruno Fernandes das Dores de Souza, Brazilian footballer and convicted murderer
- Bruno (footballer, born 1999), full name Bruno Moreira Soares, Brazilian footballer, playing in Colombia
- Bruno Barbosa (born 1985), full name Bruno Barbosa da Encarnação, Brazilian footballer
- Bruno Barbosa (footballer, born 1994), full name Bruno Nogueira Barbosa, Brazilian footballer
- Bruno (adult performer), Cuban-American model and gay adult film actor
- Giordano Bruno (1548–1600), Italian philosopher
- Bruno the Bear - Bear actor
- Bruno the Bloodhound - Italian sniffer police dog

=== United States ===
- Bruno, Arkansas, an unincorporated community
- Bruno, Minnesota, a city
- Bruno, Nebraska, a village
- Bruno, West Virginia, an unincorporated census-designated place
- Bruno Township, Butler County, Kansas
- Bruno Township, Pine County, Minnesota

=== Elsewhere ===
- Bruno, Saskatchewan, Canada, a town
- Bruno, Indonesia, a subdistrict in Purworejo Regency of Central Java
- Bruno, Piedmont, Italy, a comune (municipality) in the Province of Asti

== Entertainment ==
- Brüno, a 2009 feature film starring Sacha Baron Cohen
- Bruno (2000 film), a 2000 American film directed by and starring Shirley MacLaine
- Bruno (1988 film), a 1988 Filipino film starring Max Laurel
- Bruno (webcomic), written and drawn by Christopher Baldwin
- It's Bruno!, 2019 TV series about a puggle named Bruno
- Bruno the Kid, a 1996 animated TV series

== Other uses ==
- Bruno's, a grocery store chain based in Birmingham, Alabama
- Bruno (software), the first commercial WYSIWYG presentation program
- PC Bruno, a World War II Polish-French intelligence station outside Paris

== See also ==
- Bruno the bear (disambiguation), several fictional and nonfictional bears
- Bruneau (disambiguation)
- Bruni (disambiguation)
- San Bruno (disambiguation)
- Brno, the second largest city in the Czech Republic
- Bruno Jura Hound, a hunting dog
