= List of fatal dog attacks in Italy =

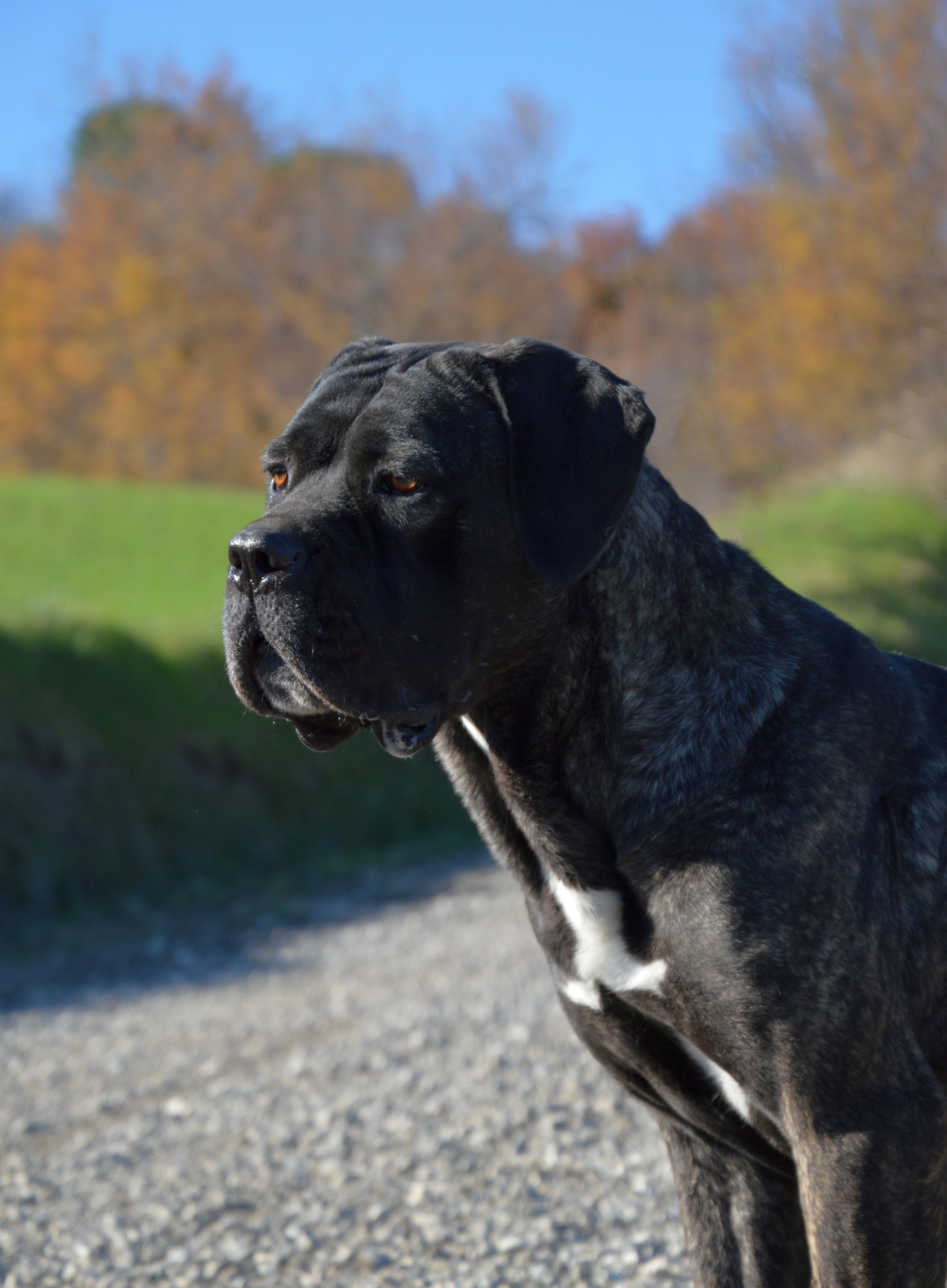
A Cane Corso is an Italian breed of mastiff.

This is a list of human deaths caused by dogs, which became publicly known in the form of reports, cause of death statistics, scientific papers, or other sources. For more information on causes of death and studies related to dog bite-related fatalities, see Fatal dog attacks.

Deaths from or after dog bites are very rare, they count as preventable deaths. According to an evaluation of the number of deaths in the period from 2009 to 2025, a total of 54 deaths were recorded throughout Italy.

A 2025 study showed that the average number of fatalities increased from 1.28 to 3.18 per year, with a noticeable rise in the recent years.

== Summary counts of fatalities by year ==
Deaths per year (1984–2008) (2009–2025):

- 1984: 1, 1985: 1, 1986: 0, 1987: 2, 1988: 2, 1989: 1
- 1990: 1, 1991: 1, 1992: 1, 1993: 2, 1994: 0, 1995: 0, 1996: 1, 1974: 1, 1998: 0, 1999: 2
- 2000: 1, 2001: 2, 2002: 3, 2003: 1, 2004: 1, 2005: 0, 2006: 1, 2007: 2, 2008: 3, 2009: 4
- 2010: 2, 2011: 3, 2012: 5, 2013: 3, 2014: 1, 2015: 2, 2016: 4, 2017: 3, 2018: 3, 2019: 3
- 2020: 3, 2021: 4, 2022: 2, 2023: 2, 2024: 5, 2025: 5 (6*)

*according to this list.

== Fatalities ==
Date	Victim	Dog type (Number)	Circumstances
March 22, 2025	Erina Licari, 62, female	Large mixed breed	Sicily, Petrosino, Trapani — The woman went into her garage to feed the family dog and was attacked.
February 17, 2025	Salvatore Maggiore, 84, male	Cane Corso (2)	Sicily, Bagheria, Palermo — He went outside to pick flowers and was attacked by his neighbors loose dogs. The dogs were seized by authorities.
February 15, 2025	Giulia Loffredo, <1, female	Pit bull, mixed breed	Campania, Acerra — The 9-month-old was attacked by her parents' dog named Tyler while sleeping in their bed. She died in the hospital. The father initially told authorities that she had been attacked by a stray dog.
January 19, 2025	Patrizio Donati, 72, male	German Mastiff (2)	Lombardy, Cerro Maggiore — Family members found the dog breeder in his garden after he was attacked by 2 of his 12 dogs.
January 13, 2025	Patricia Masithela, 27 or 29, female	Pit bull (2)	Lazio, Latina — She was attacked by at least 2 dogs at a friend's house. The house was half-abandoned and the dogs were not well cared for. There were 5 dogs at the property.
July 16, 2024 February 2025 †	Margherita Villante, 74, female	Pit bull	Abruzzo, l'Aquila — She and her sister were attacked by their neighbor's dog. Her sister was also severely injured. Both of the victim's arms had to be amputated and she died several months later in hospital.
June 6, 2024 June 10, 2024 †	Maria Concetta Petruzzi, 97, female	Cane Corso	Apulia, Lecce, Alessano — A nearby police officer heard the woman scream and rushed to the scene. He had to shoot the dog to help the woman. She died a few days later in hospital. The dog belonged to the family.
May 17, 2024	Michele, <1, male	Pit bull	Piedmont, Palazzolo Vercellese — The 5-month-old boy was attacked by his parents' 8-year-old dog named Nero. At the time of the attack he was in the care of his grandmother, while his parents were outside.
April 22, 2024	Francesco Pio D'Amaro, 1, male	Pit bull (2)	Campania, Eboli, Campolongo — The 13-month-old boy was in his uncle's or mother's arms (reports vary) when the dogs attacked him. The boy's mother and another uncle tried to free the child from the dogs' grip, but were also attacked by the dogs and suffered wounds to their hands and legs. According to the family, the dogs have not been aggressive in the past. In May 2024 Salerno prosecutors ordered not to euthanize the dogs. They will be trained and given back to their owners. If the owners don't want to pay for their treatment, the dogs named Totò and Pablo will be placed in foster care afterwards.
February 29, 2024	Gianna Canova, 80, female	Central Asian Ovcharka	Pesaro Urbino, Mercato Conca – She was on her porch when she was attacked by the family dog named Tigre. She died at the scene. There had been previous incidents involving the dog. The dog was rehomed after he received training.
February 11, 2024	Paolo Pasqualini, 39, male	Rottweiler (3)	Lazio, Manziana — The man was out for a walk as he often did when he was attacked by 3 loose dogs. A nearby farmer became aware of the attack and tried to scare the dogs away. Since they then attacked the farmer, he retreated into his car and called for help. The victim had serious injuries to his face, neck, and arms and died at the scene. When emergency services arrived, the dogs fled to the nearby recreation park. The park was evacuated and a search for the dogs began. The dogs were found, sedated, and taken to a kennel.
October 20, 2023	Enrica Bensi, 86, female	Pit bull	Lombardy, Pavia, Corana — The victim was out walking near her home when the dog named "Demon" escaped into the street and attacked her.
April 8, 2023	Patrizia La Marca, 53, female	Rottweiler	Liguria, Ventimiglia — The victim was feeding her brother's dog and was attacked.
December, 2022	Iolanda Besutti, 68, female	Rottweiler (2)	Emilia-Romagna, Modena, Concordia — The woman was attacked in her home by her family dogs.
June 19, 2022	66, male	Pit bull (2)	Apulia, Foggiano, Cerignola — The man was attacked near a rural farmhouse. The owner of the dogs was also injured while trying to help the victim.
October 12, 2021	Carmen Gorzanelli, 89, female	American Staffordshire Terrier (2)	Emilia-Romagna, Sassuolo, Modena — The victim wandered into the neighbors garden and was attacked by the two dogs "Zeus" and "Kira".
August 26, 2021	Simona Cavallaro, 20, female	Pack of livestock guarding dogs (10+) including Maremmano-Abruzzese Sheepdog (1+)	Calabria, Satriano — The young woman and her friend were exploring the area to find a good picnic spot in the pine forest at Mount Fiorino when a herd of sheep arrived, accompanied by their guarding dogs. The herd was not supposed to be in this area. Initially, the pack of dogs seemed friendly and calm. The young man even took a video of Cavallaro with the dogs. However, at one point, one dog started to bark at her, and the other dogs in the pack began to surround and attack her. The young man was able to hide in a nearby building.
August 24, 2021	Lorenza Pioletti, 63, female	American Staffordshire Terrier or Staffordshire Bull Terrier	Piedmont, Pieve Vergonte, Megolo — She was attacked by her dog in her home and died at the scene. The dog has already shown aggressive behavior toward her brother.
April 14, 2021	Americo Tullio, 80, male	Pit bull (2)	Lazio, between Morolo and Ferentino — He was out to collect wild asparagus. He was found dead with the dogs around.
December 20, 2020	Mariangela Zaffino, 74, female	Czechoslovakian Wolfdog (5)	Piedmont, Grugliasco — She was attacked by her five pet dogs in her flat.
April 11, 2020	Cristian, <1, male	Cane Corso	Apulia, Tricase — The 8-month-old was killed by the family dog.
February 5, 2020	Leonarda Piga, 64 or 63, female	German Mastiff (2)	Lombardy, Zeme, San Giorgio di Lomellina, Cascina Liberata — The woman was found dead on a farm where she went to care for eight dogs. Two female dogs attacked her. The owner of the dogs is a breeder.
December, 2019	Massimo Sartori, 49, male	Rottweiler (2)	Veneto, Pozzonovo — The victim was found injured by a 9-year-old female named Kyra and a 2-year-old male named Colt. The dogs belonged to his partner. The bites were not fatal, but he suffered medical issues.
October 25, 2019	Avellino Corazza, 74, male	American Staffordshire Terrier (2)	Friuli-Venezia Giulia, Pordenone — He went to feed his sister-in-law's dogs, which he knew well, and was attacked. His wife tried to help him and was also injured. His son shot one of the dogs.
March 21 or 24, 2019	Gianluca Romagnoli, 43, male	Cane Corso	Lazio, Roma, Borghesiana— He was walking his dog Thiago and was fatally injured by him not far from his home.
October 26, 2018 October 31 †	Giovanni Camasso, 62, male	Pit bull (2)	Apulia, Barletta Andria-Trani, San Ferdinando di Puglia — Camasso was attacked while he was on his way to collect vegetables. A male and a female dog escaped their property and attacked the man on his bike.
September 9, 2018	Giovanni Marcone, 60, male	German Shepherd	Lazio, Latina, Fondi — The victim visited a property he wanted to buy and was attacked by the owner's dog.
January 2, 2018	Agatino Zuccaro, 55, male	Cane Corso (3)	Sicily, Pagliarello, Portopalo di Capo Passero, Syracuse — Zuccaro delivered a package to guests of a property and was attacked by three dogs.
September 17, 2017	Victoria Zikaj, 1, female	Pit bull (2)	Lombardy, Brescia, Flero — The one-year-old was attacked by her grandfather's two dogs.
July 2017	Vincenza Mei, 88, female	Mastiff (molossoid)	Lazio, Rieti, Poggio Catino — The woman was found dead by her daughter. She had severe injuries caused by a molossoid dog she recently adopted.
April 19, 2017	Vito Zaccaria, 77, male	Pit bull (2) Mixed breed (1)	Apulia, Francavilla Fontana, Capitolo — Zaccaria went out to throw garbage in his bins and was attacked by 3 escaped dogs. The dog's owners were convicted of manslaughter in 2023. The conviction was upheld on appeal in 2025.
November 7, 2016	Pasquale Malafronte, 78, male	Cane Corso (2)	Campania, Battipaglia — He went to feed his two male dogs and was attacked. He had a very small dog with him which he might tried to protect from being attacked.
October 19, 2016	Ferdinando Di Rocco, 1, male	Cane Corso	Abruzzo, Pescara — A 19-month-old child was killed by the family's two-year-old female dog named Giulia.
August 15, 2016	Giorgio, 1, male	Dogo Argentino	Sicily, Mascalucia, Catania — The child was playing unattended in a small pool when it was attacked by one of the family's two dogs. Both dogs were kept in the house and raised as companion dogs and have played with the child before. They were not trained as guard dogs, according to the family.
June 2016	Maria Rosa Pozzi, 76, female	American Staffordshire Terrier (2)	Lombardy, Milan, Inveruno — She was in her backyard when she was attacked by her son's dogs named Muk and Nera. The dogs were 7 and 9 years old. Neighbors heard the screams and alerted emergency services. She later died at Niguarda hospital.
October 29, 2015	Vincenzo Zibella, 61, male	Cane Corso (2)	Campania, Caserta, Formis, Sant’Angelo, Tifatini Mountains —The dogs escaped a nearby property and attacked the man.
May 25, 2015	Astrid Guarini, 3, female	Belgian Shepherd	Friuli-Venezia Giulia, San Martino al Tagliamento — She was visiting her uncle and was attacked by his dog.
April 15, 2002	Vincenzo Ramis, 60, and Salvatore Rizzello, 62, male	Pit bull (2)	Salento, San Pietro Vernotico — A dog owner was sentenced in October 2010 for double manslaughter after his dogs escaped his property and killed two men in 2002.

== Literature ==
- Iarussi, Fabrizio, Francesco Sessa, Serena Piccirillo, Martina Francaviglia, Alessandra Recchia, Antonella Colella, Matteo Bolcato, Monica Salerno, Angelo Peli, and Cristoforo Pomara. 2025. "Fatal Dog Attacks in Italy (2009–2025): The Urgent Need for a National Risk Registry" Animals 15, no. 24: 3523.
- Ciceroni, C.; Gostinicchi, S. Aggressivitá Canina: Indagine Epidemiologica Sulle Aggressioni ad Esito Letale in Italia Negli Anni 1984–2009. (Aggressive dogs: epidemiological survey on fatal attacks in Italy over the years 1984–2009) Vet. Ital. 2009, 45, 67–72.

== See also ==
- Bruno (dog) – killing of an Italian sniffer dog
- List of fatal alligator attacks in the United States
- List of fatal bear attacks in North America
- List of fatal cougar attacks in North America
- Lists of fatal shark attacks
- List of fatal snake bites in the United States
- List of fatal snake bites in Australia
- List of wolf attacks
- Dog bite
