= Abersee =

Coordinates: 47°44′N 13°25′E

Abersee is a name given to the western end of the Wolfgangsee, a lake in Austria that lies mostly within the state of Salzburg and which is one of the best known lakes in the Salzkammergut resort region. The name is also associated with the south-western part of the municipality of St. Gilgen.

The name derives from the local dialect word "aper", which means snowless, as the western part of the Wolfgangsee does not freeze in winter.

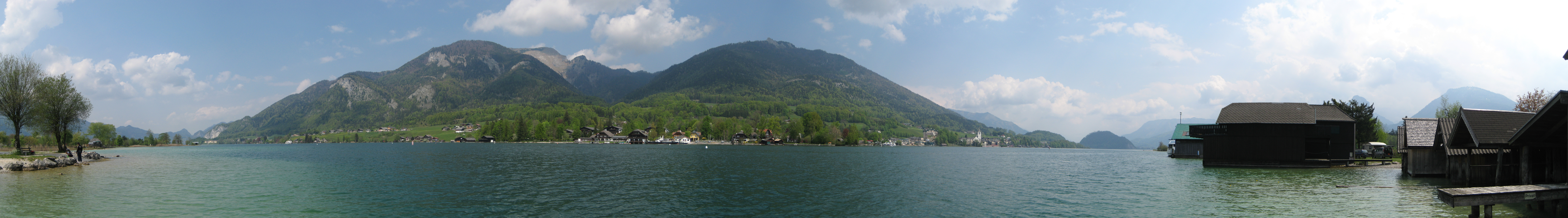
View of Wolfgangsee from Abersee
