= Lake Wolfgang =

Lake in Austria

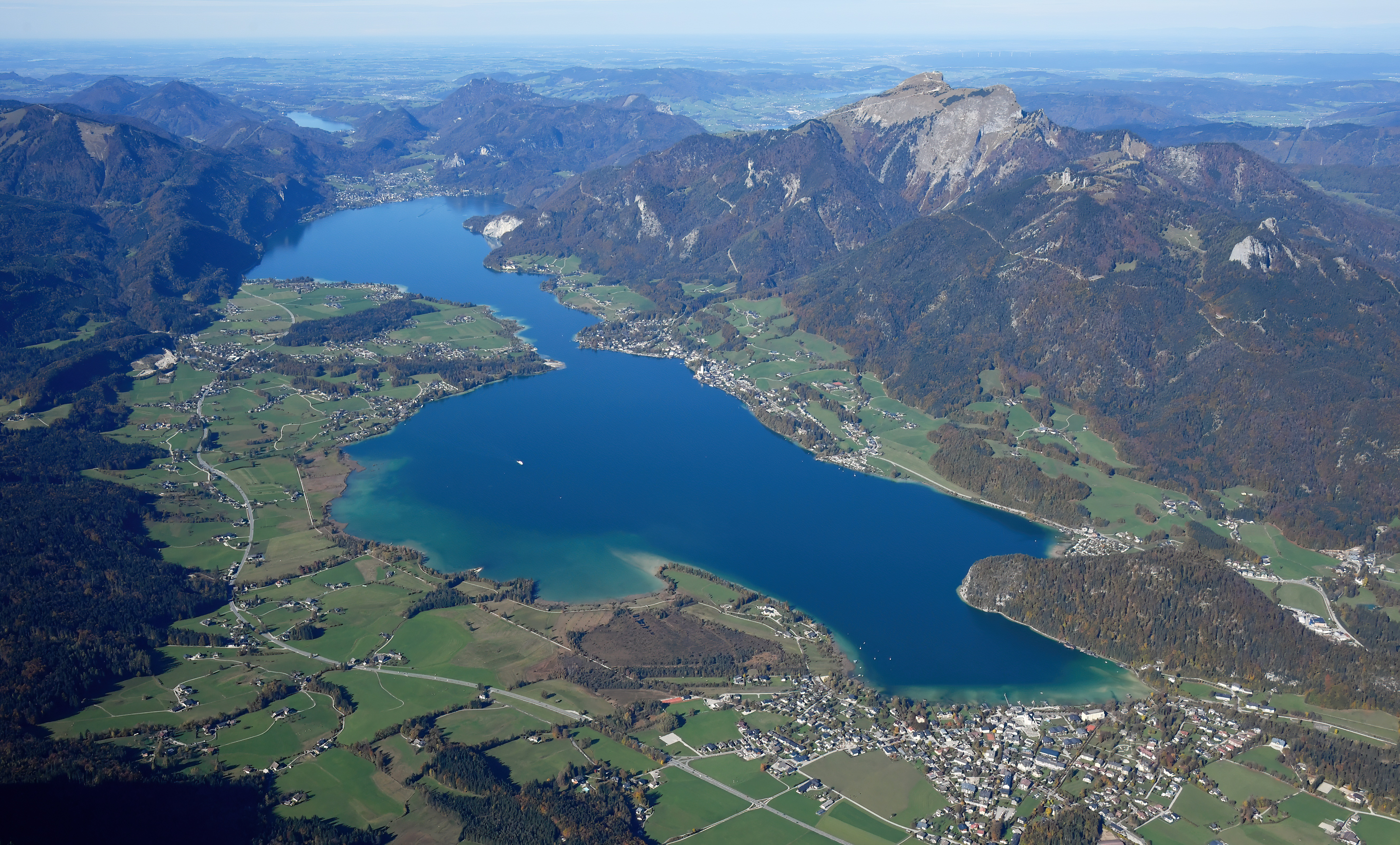
- Lake Wolfgang and Schafberg

- Location within Austria
- Location: Salzburg, Upper Austria
- Coordinates: 47°45′N 13°24′E
- Type: Glacial lake
- Basin countries: Austria
- Surface area: 13 km^{2} (5.0 sq mi)
- Max. depth: 114 m (374 ft)
- Water volume: 667.07 million cubic metres (540,800 acre⋅ft)
- Surface elevation: 538 m (1,765 ft)
- Settlements: Strobl, St. Gilgen, Abersee, Ried, St. Wolfgang

Lake Wolfgang (German: Wolfgangsee) is a lake in Austria that lies mostly within the state of Salzburg and is one of the best-known lakes in the Salzkammergut resort region. The municipalities on its shore are Strobl, St Gilgen, the villages of Abersee and Ried and the market town of St Wolfgang in the state of Upper Austria. The town and the lake are named after Saint Wolfgang of Regensburg, who according to legend built the first church here in the late 10th century.

== Overview ==
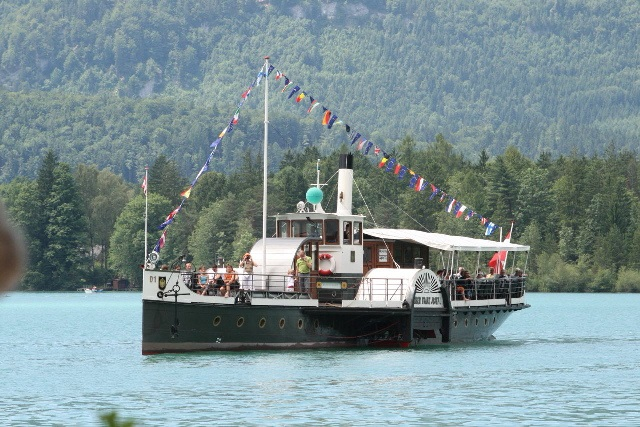
Paddle steamer Franz Josef I.

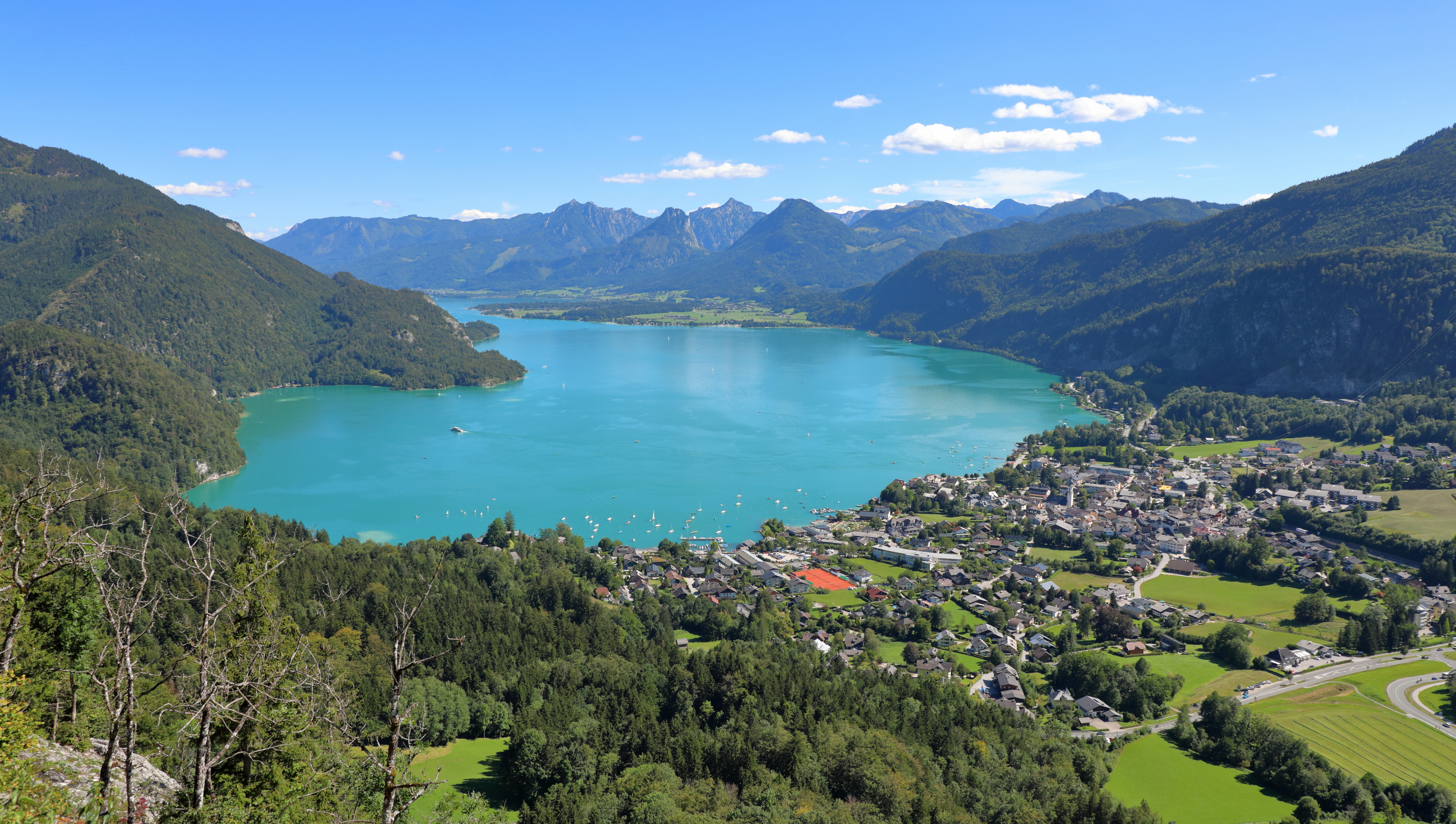
Abersee and St. Gilgen

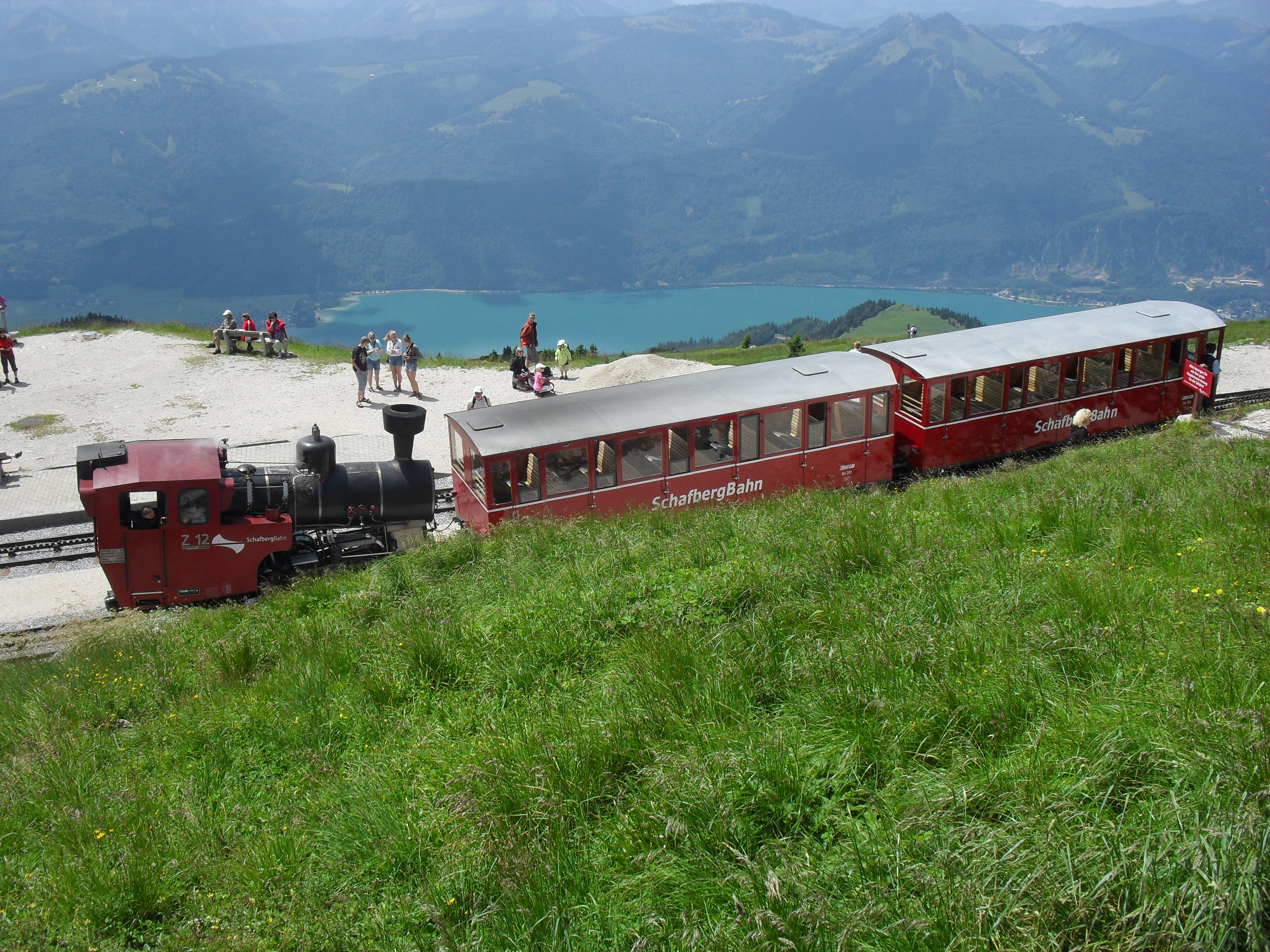
Schafberg Railway

Lake Wolfgang stretches about 10.5 kilometres from northwest to southeast. It is divided into two parts by a peninsula, called die Enge (the Narrow), roughly in the middle of its southern shore opposite St Wolfgang, where it is no more than 200 metres wide. The western portion of the lake at St Gilgen is known as the Abersee.

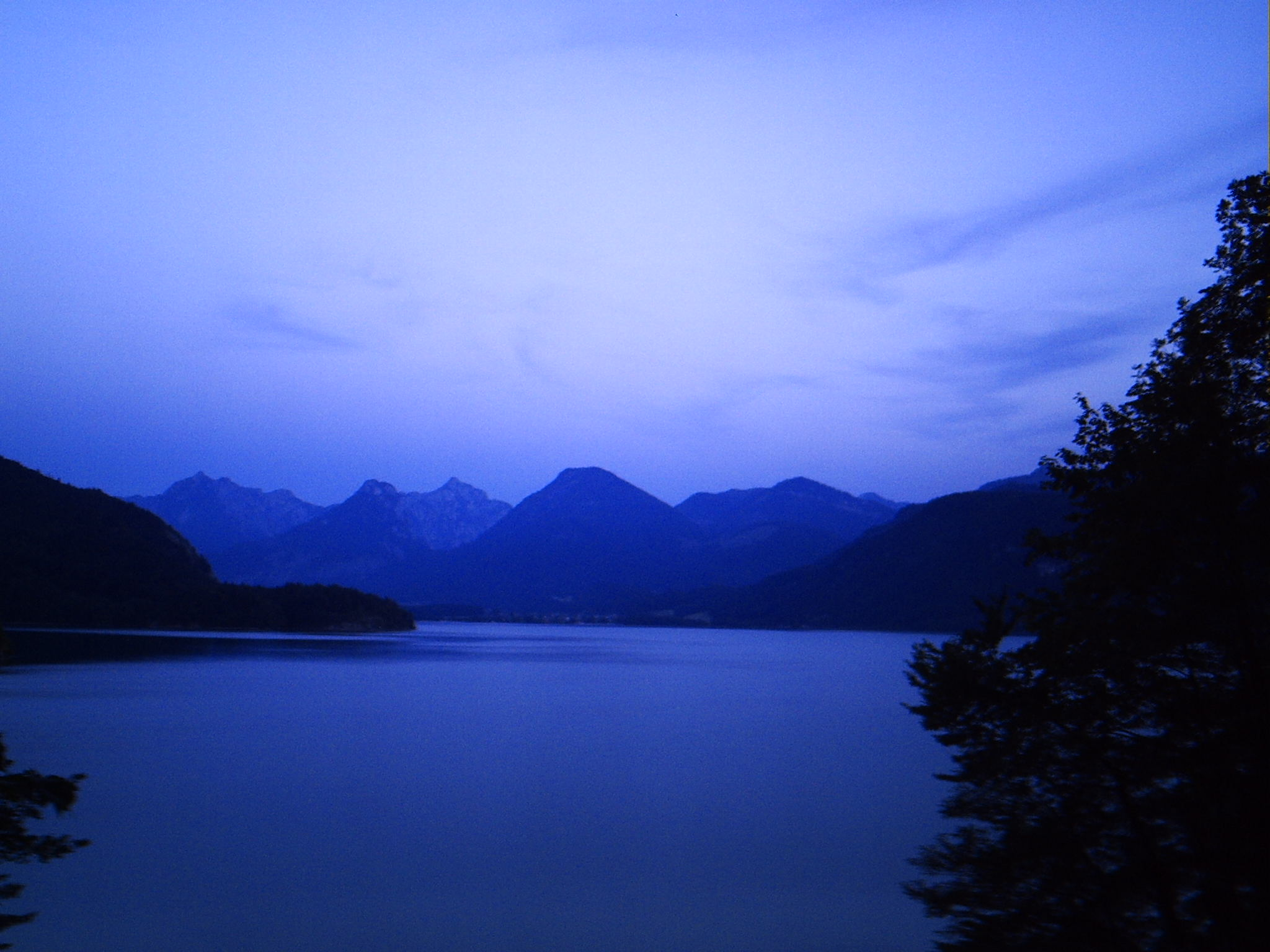
The lake in the evening

The lake has an area of about 12.9 to 13.1 km^{2} and is surrounded by the Salzkammergut mountain range. On the northern side is the Schafberg. A rack railway, the Schafbergbahn, leads up to the summit at 1,782 m. Owing to the steep shore at its foot only a footpath connects St Wolfgang and the village of Ried with St Gilgen along the Falkensteinwand, the set of the Bergpsalmen ("mountain psalms") lyric anthology written by Joseph Viktor von Scheffel in 1870. In the south and southwest of Lake Wolfgang lies the Osterhorngruppe, with heights up to 1,800 metres. Directly south of St Gilgen rises the Zwölferhorn (1,522 m), which can be visited by cable car.

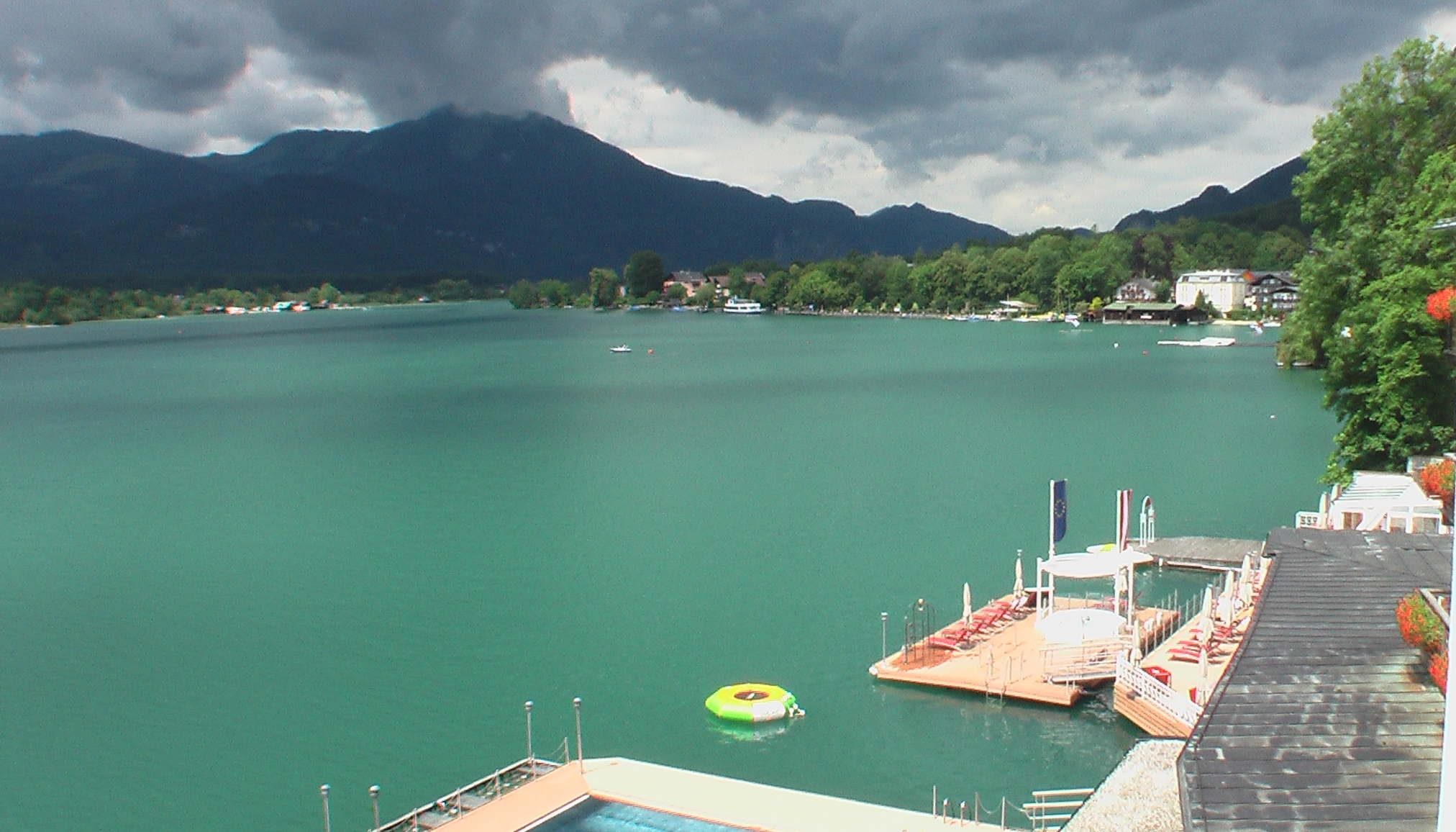
Lake Wolfgang seen from Gasthaus Weißes Rössl at St. Wolfgang

The settlements around the lake, especially St Wolfgang and St Gilgen are popular resort towns, mainly in summer. The Gasthaus Weißes Rössl at St Wolfgang is the set of the famous 1897 play The White Horse Inn by Oscar Blumenthal and Gustav Kadelburg. The play, popular internationally, was adapted into a successful operetta in 1930 by Ralph Benatzky. Both works have been performed throughout the world and filmed several times. The area around the lake has also been the location of several Heimatfilm films, suggesting an untouched alpine idyll. Because former German chancellor Helmut Kohl had a holiday home by the lake for many years, the film director Christoph Schlingensief made the lake a site of his Chance 2000 project of 1998 when he invited "Germany's four million unemployed" to bathe in the lake and flood Kohl's residence.

== Transport ==
The Bundesstraße B158 from Bad Ischl to Salzburg runs along the southern shore of Lake Wolfgang. In St Gilgen the B154 highway branches off, leading to the A1 Westautobahn motorway (European route E55 and E60). The former Salzkammergut-Lokalbahn narrow-gauge railway to Salzburg went out of service in 1957. Ship transport on the lake is provided by the Salzburg AG public utility company, which runs six vessels. St Gilgen is easily accessible by public bus 150, which runs between Salzburg and Bad Ischl every half hour. It is free for tourists with a QR code provided by their hotel.

== See also ==
- Salzburg
- Salzburgerland
- Schafbergbahn
- Brunnwinkl
