= Bruneau =

Bruneau may refer to:

== Places ==
- Bruneau, Idaho, a town in the United States
- Bruneau Dunes State Park, Idaho
- Bruneau River, in Idaho

== Other uses ==
- Bruneau (surname)
- Bruneau Restaurant, a Michelin-starred restaurant in Brussels

== See also ==
- Bruno (disambiguation)
