= Bruneau (surname) =

Bruneau is a French surname meaning "the brown or dark [haired / skinned] one". It is the (western) variant form of the French surnames Brunel, Burnel, Busnel, Bunel- See: An Bru’, Bruno, Bruff, Brown; (often anglicized as Brunell, Burnell). Notable people with the surname include:

- Alfred Bruneau, French composer
- Anne Bruneau, Canadian botanist
- Carol Bruneau, Canadian writer
- Peppi Bruneau, American lawyer and politician
- Pierre Bruneau (disambiguation)
- Romane Bruneau (born 1996), French footballer
- Sharon Bruneau, bodybuilder and fitness competitor
