= St. Hubert Jura Hound =

Bruno du Jura Hound
- Other names: Jura Laufhund St. Hubert
- Origin: Switzerland
- Breed status: Not recognised as a breed by any major kennel club.
Traits
- Height: 46–59 cm (18–23 in)
- Weight: 15–20 kg (33–44 lb)
- Coat: Short
- Colour: Black and tan

The St. Hubert Jura Hound is a breed of scenthound originating in the Jura Mountains on the French-Swiss border.

== Overview ==
The St. Hubert Jura Hound is a medium-sized hound; it is black and tan in colour with no white at all. The St. Hubert Jura Hound closely resembles the slightly smaller Bruno Jura Hound, to which it is closely related, although it has distinctly more pendulous flews and dewlaps.

Both the St. Hubert Jura and Bruno Jura Hounds are closely related to nearby French hounds; all are believed to have descended from the St. Hubert Hound, which the St. Hubert Jura Hound closely resembles.

The St. Hubert Jura Hound is used by hunters to pursue quarry that is hunted on foot in the Jura Mountains on the Swiss side of the French-Swiss border; it is said to possess incredible scenting prowess and surprising speed and agility when hunting.

== See also ==
- List of dog breeds
