= Strobl =

- Municipality
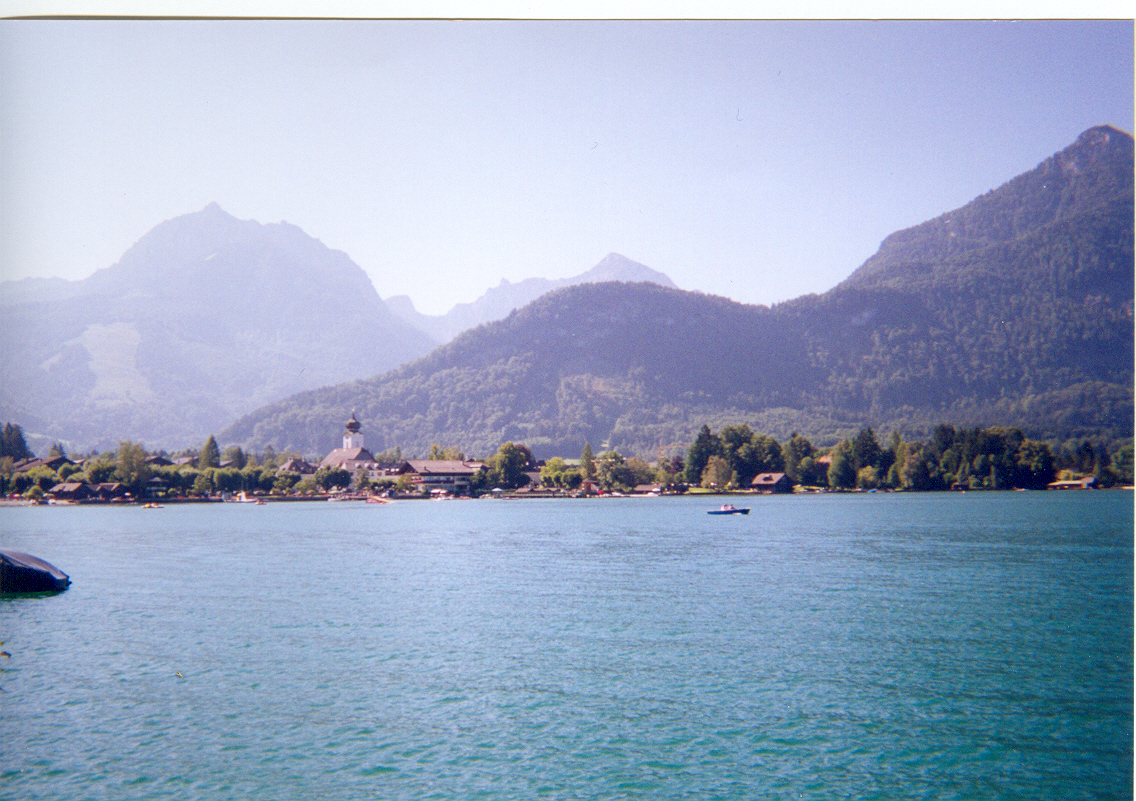
- Strobl from the Wolfgangsee, with Mt. Rettenkogel (1780 m) (left) and Sparber (1502 m) (right) in the background. The smaller, nearer wooded hill is the "Hirsl", obscuring all but the summit of Rinnkogel (1823 m)

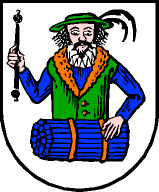
- Coat of arms

- Location within Austria
- Coordinates: 47°43′00″N 13°28′00″E
- Country: Austria
- State: Salzburg
- District: Salzburg-Umgebung

Government
  - Mayor: Josef Weikinger (ÖVP)

Area
  - Total: 93.88 km^{2} (36.25 sq mi)
- Elevation: 542 m (1,778 ft)

Population (2018-01-01)
  - Total: 3,645
  - Density: 38.83/km^{2} (100.6/sq mi)
- Time zone: UTC+1 (CET)
  - Summer (DST): UTC+2 (CEST)
- Postal code: 5350
- Area code: 06137
- Vehicle registration: SL
- Website: www.strobl.salzburg.at

Strobl (or Strobl am Wolfgangsee) is a municipality of the Salzburg-Umgebung District (Flachgau), in the northeastern portion of the Austrian state of Salzburg, right on the border with Upper Austria. It comprises the Katastralgemeinden of Aigen, Gschwendt, Strobl, and Weißenbach.

== Geography ==
It lies on the eastern side of lake Wolfgangsee in the Salzkammergut resort region, close to Sankt Gilgen and the Upper Austrian municipalities of St. Wolfgang and Bad Ischl. The town has a population of 3,453 (2001) and an area of 93.89 km^{2}.

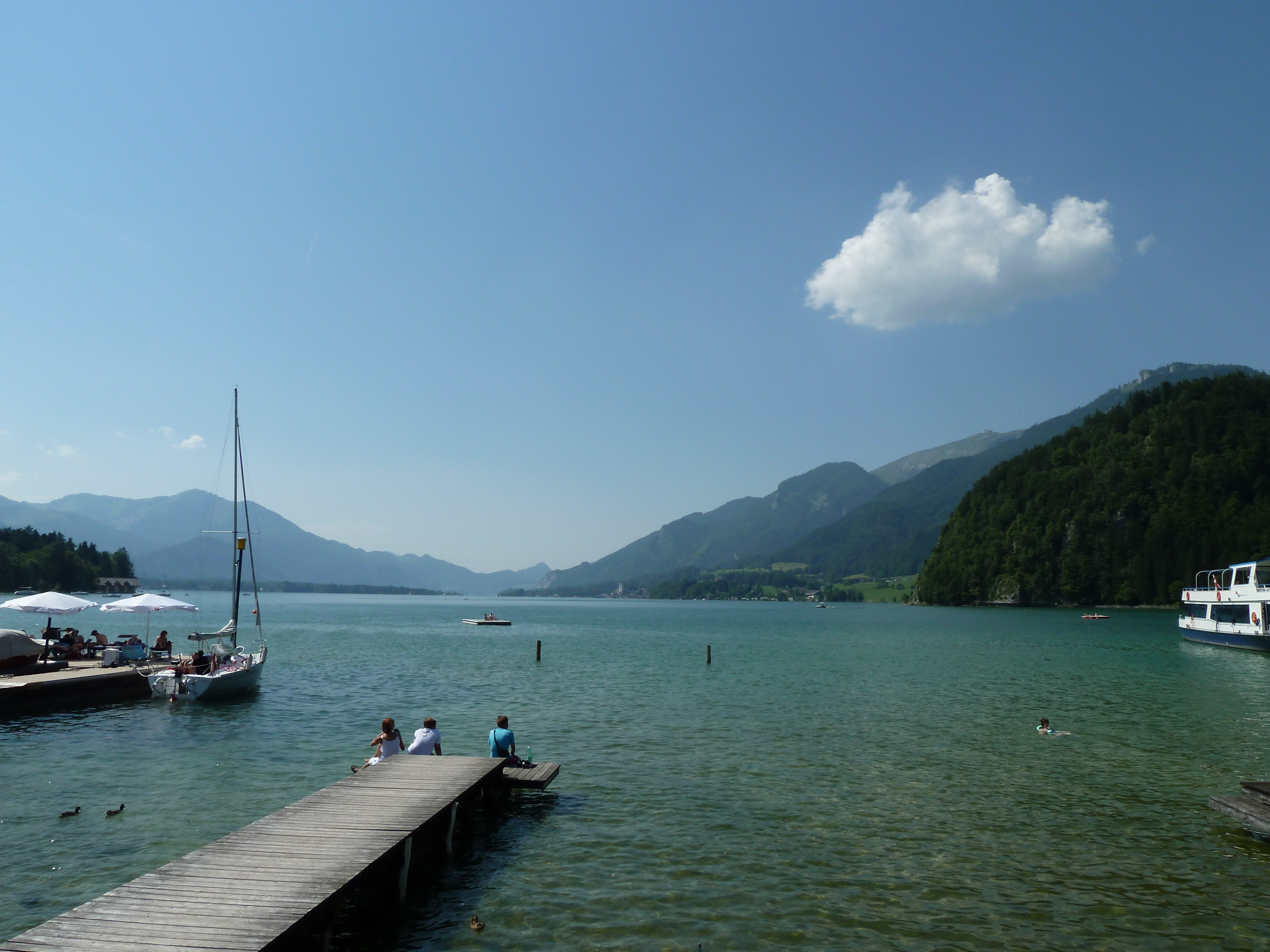
Lakeside

== History ==
The town was in the US zone of Allied-occupied Austria after the war, where the villa of the Viennese banking family Deutsch (expropriated by the Nazis in 1938) served as an officers' club. Strobl was the site of a Displaced Persons camp.

== St. Sigismund Parish Church ==
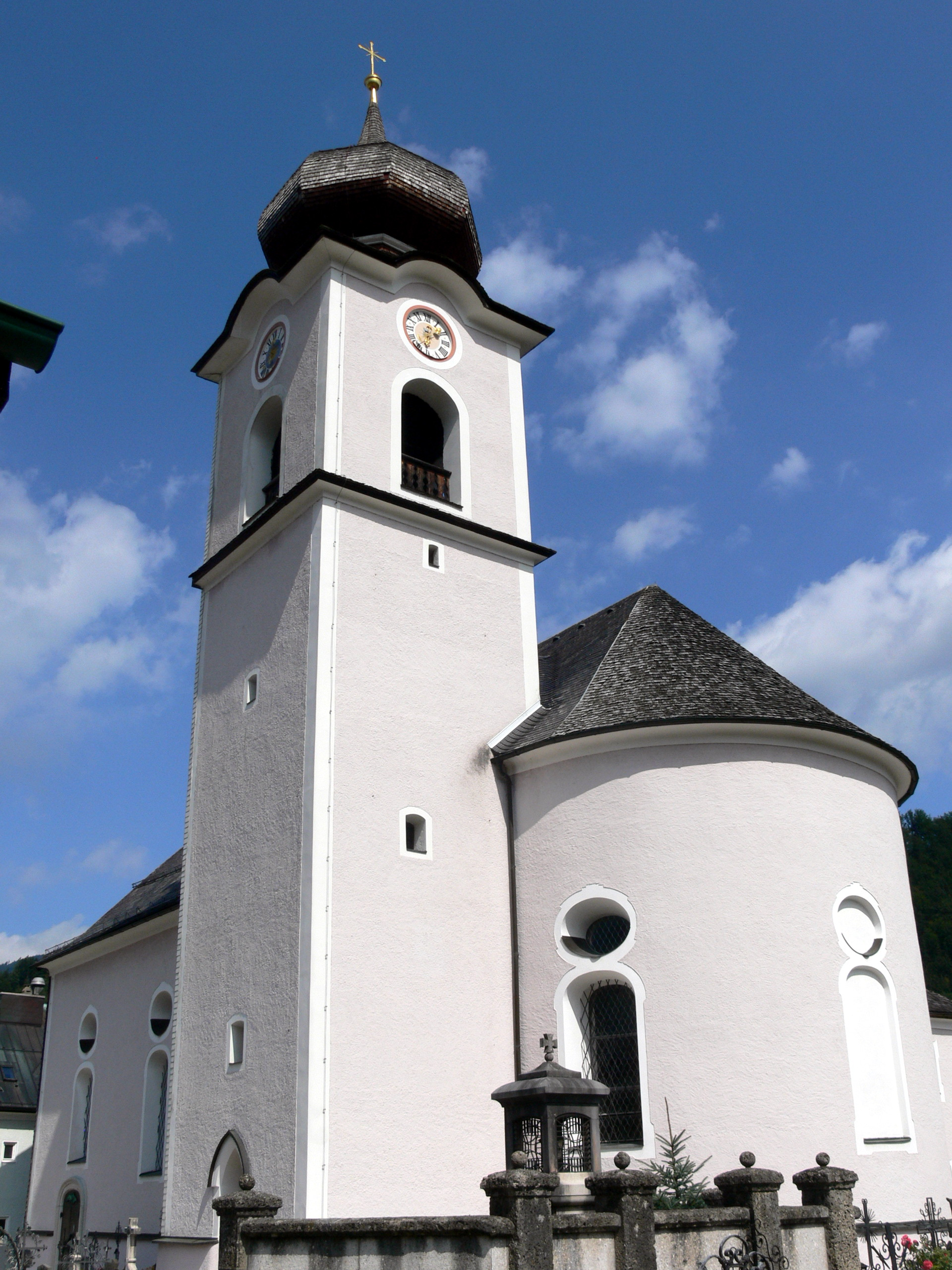
St. Sigismund parish church

Strobl has a church (de:Pfarrkirche St. Sigismund (Strobl)), where Prince Tassilo von Fürstenberg (de:Tassilo von Fürstenberg) is buried.

In 1758 the archbishop Sigismund III (Christoph von Schrattenbach) commissioned Kassian Singer, master builder from Kitzbühel, to build a church in the village. Singer died before the completion of the project, which was given to Palier Andrä Huber of St. Gilgen. The church was dedicated to the archbishop's patron saint on May 3, 1761.

The building's original late Baroque appearance is maintained in virtually pristine condition. The high altar painting, by Johann Benedikt Werkstätter (de:Benedikt Werkstätter), depicts St. Sigmund along with the Holy Trinity. There are also statues of St. Christopher and St. Joseph by Sebastian Eberl. The high altar and tabernacle were made by Lorenz Hörmbler. On the left side-altar is depicted Our Lady of Good Counsel, and on the right, St. Francis de Sales, painted by Peter Anton Lorenzoni.

A new organ (built by Orgelbau Felsberg) was dedicated in 2003.

== Politics ==
Seats in the municipal assembly (Gemeinderat) as of 2009 elections:

- Austrian People's Party (ÖVP): 13
- Social Democratic Party of Austria (SPÖ): 6
- Freedom Party of Austria (FPÖ): 2

== Notable residents ==
- Hugo von Hofmannsthal chose Strobl as his favorite retreat.
- Strobl was the summer home of the actor Emil Jannings from 1929, and his primary residence after 1945, where he died in 1950.
- After the deposition of the Nazi officials in May 1945, the actor Theo Lingen served a few days as de facto mayor of the town.
- In spring 1945 King Leopold III of Belgium was interned held as a prisoner of war with his family by 200 men of the Waffen-SS until he was released by the 106th Cavalry Group of the US Army in May 1945.
- In 1973 Hildegard Knef lived at the Hubertushof hunting lodge of Prince Fürstenberg.
- Helene Thimig actress and wife of theatre director Max Reinhardt, lived more than 20 years in Strobl. She is memorialized by a bust on the Promenade.
