= St. Gilgen =

Sankt Gilgen Sankt Gieng
- Municipality
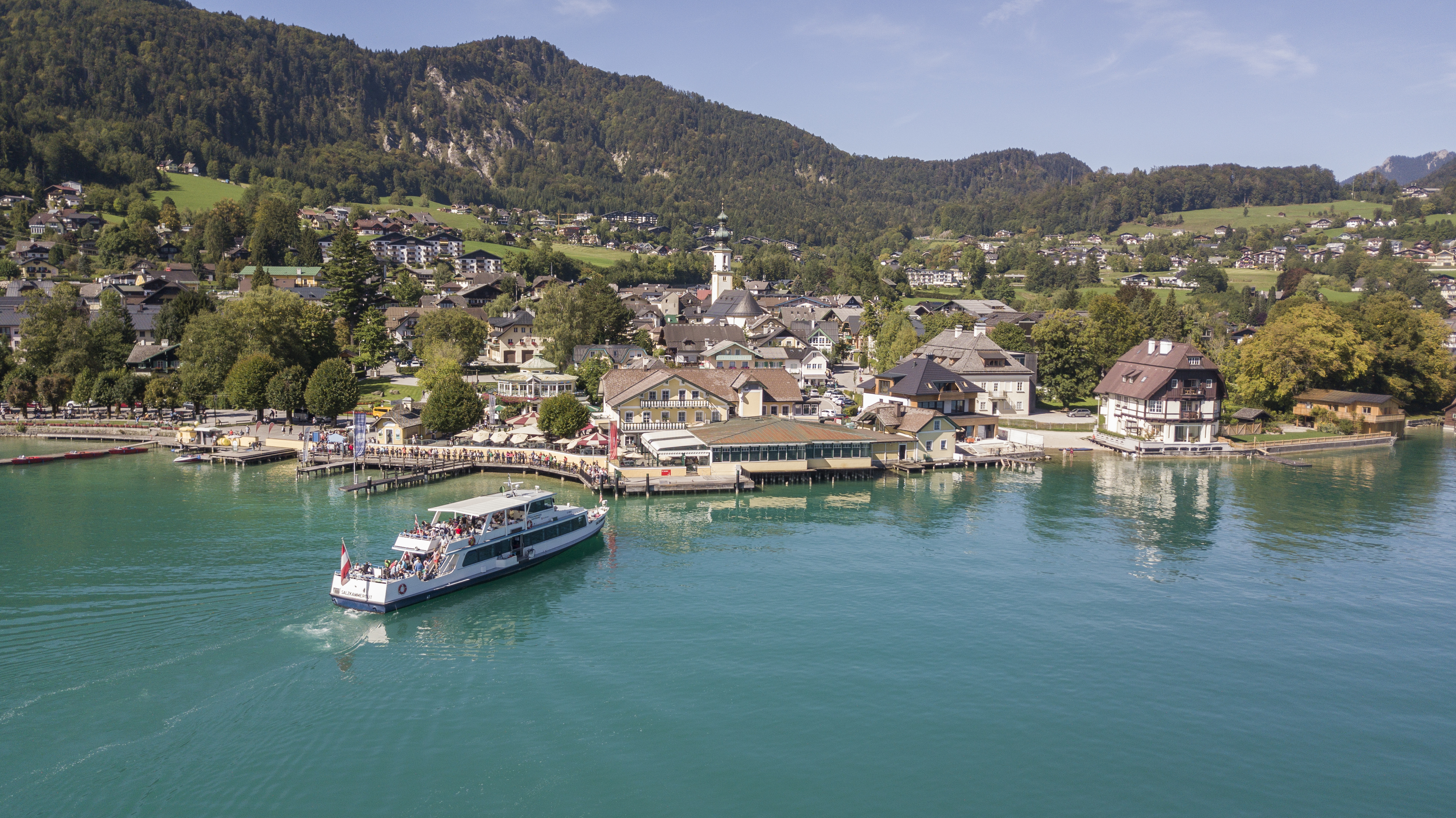

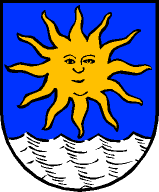
- Coat of arms

- Location within Salzburg State Location within Austria
- Coordinates: 47°46′00″N 13°22′00″E
- Country: Austria
- State: Salzburg
- District: Salzburg-Umgebung

Government
  - Mayor: Otto Kloiber (ÖVP)

Area
  - Total: 98.72 km^{2} (38.12 sq mi)
- Elevation: 545 m (1,788 ft)

Population (2018-01-01)
  - Total: 3,915
  - Density: 39.66/km^{2} (102.7/sq mi)
- Time zone: UTC+1 (CET)
  - Summer (DST): UTC+2 (CEST)
- Postal code: 5340
- Area code: +43 6227
- Vehicle registration: SL
- Website: www.gemgilgen.at

Sankt Gilgen (Central Bavarian: Sankt Gieng; also St. Gilgen) is a village by Lake Wolfgang in the Austrian state of Salzburg, in the Salzkammergut region.

== History ==
Named after Saint Giles, Sankt Gilgen was first mentioned in documents in 1376. In 1863, shipping on Lake Wolfgang started and brought attention to the little village. The construction of the Salzkammergut-Lokalbahn in 1893 led to another increase in tourism. Rich Viennese, such as the surgeon Theodor Billroth, started to build summer residences there.

== Geography ==
Sankt Gilgen is situated in the north-western shore of the lake Wolfgangsee, close to Strobl and to the Upper Austrian municipality of St. Wolfgang. It has 3,784 inhabitants, lies 545 metres above sea level and covers an area of 98.67 square kilometres.

== Overview ==
The parish church is dedicated to Saint Aegidius (Latin), in English Saint Giles, which is reflected in the name of the town, Sankt Gilgen.

St. Gilgen is a well-known travel destination. Boats from St. Gilgen sail around the Wolfgangsee, providing transport and views of the surrounding mountains. The hermitage of the original St. Gilgen may be seen, behind a chapel, in the Falkenstein cliffs west of St. Wolfgang and east of Fürberg.

In 2005 St. Gilgen was promoted as the "Mozart Village" by the Wolfgangsee Tourist Board. Although Wolfgang Amadeus Mozart never visited St. Gilgen (as he had intended to), his grandfather worked in the town, his mother was born in St. Gilgen, a cousin of his had an apple stand in the town square, and his sister Nannerl moved there after her marriage. The village now boasts a first-class international school, the St. Gilgen International School.

The Gut Aich Priory (Benedictine) was founded in St. Gilgen in 1993.

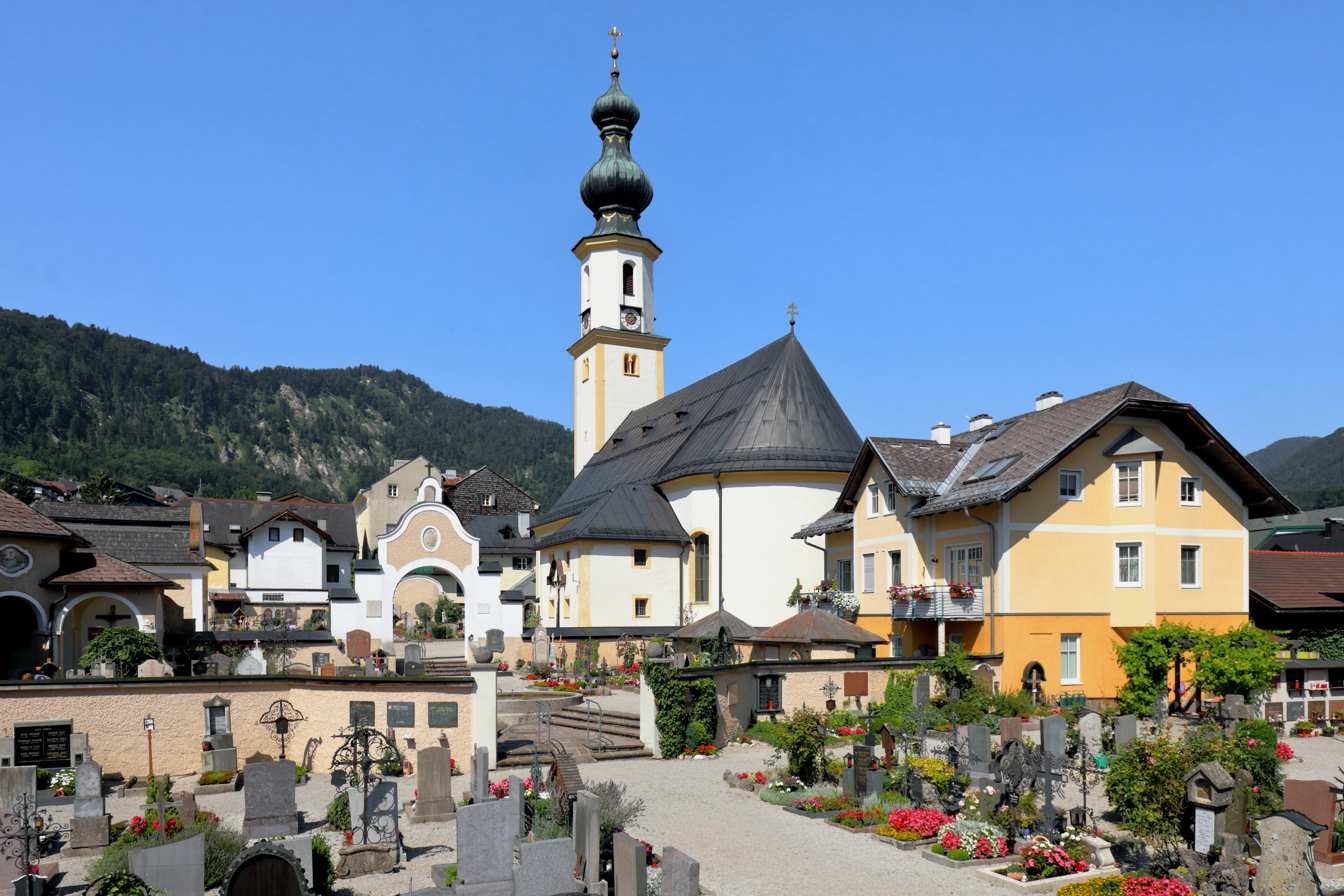
Parish church and cemetery in the center of Sankt Gilgen

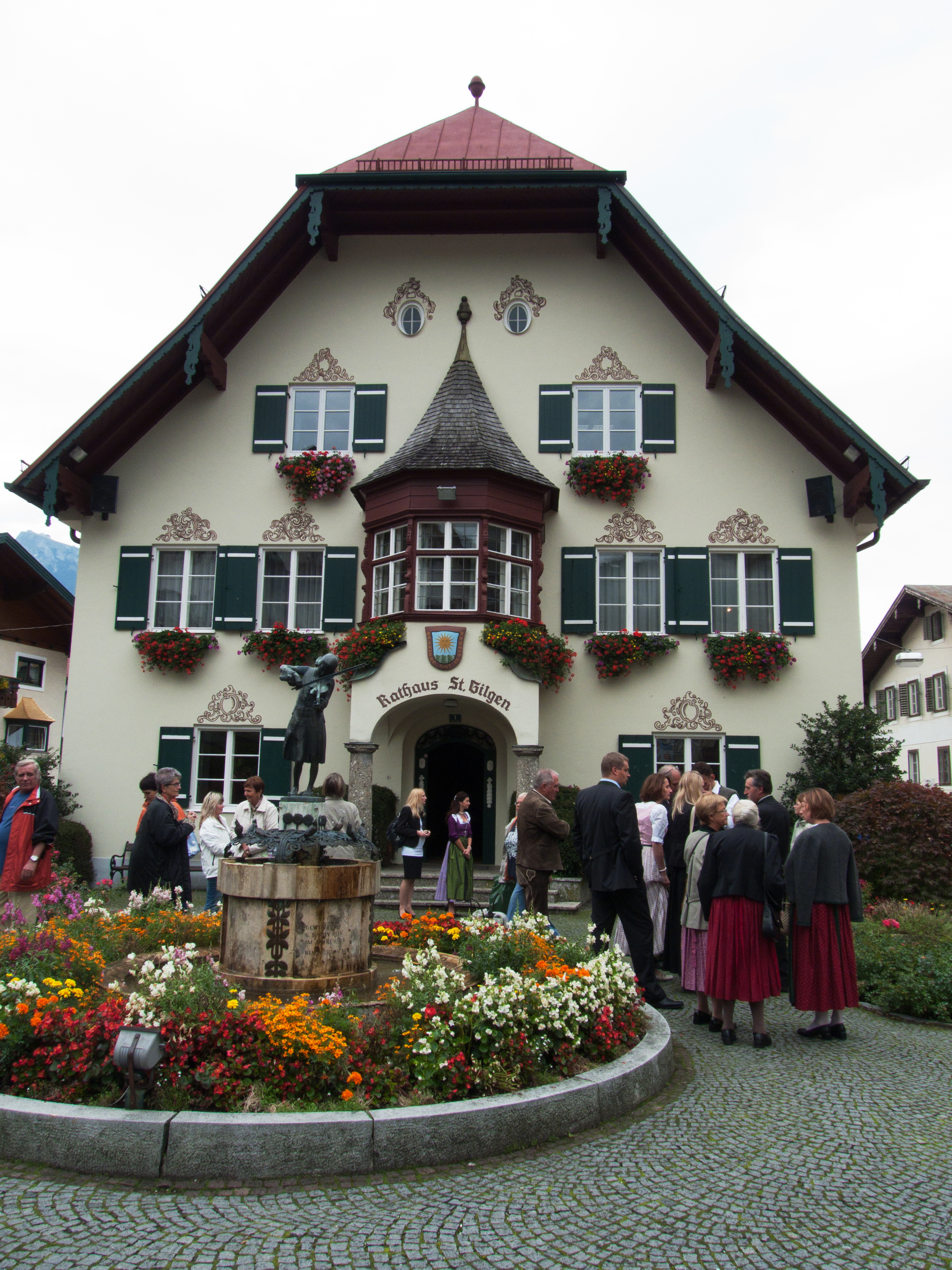
Town hall of Sankt Gilgen

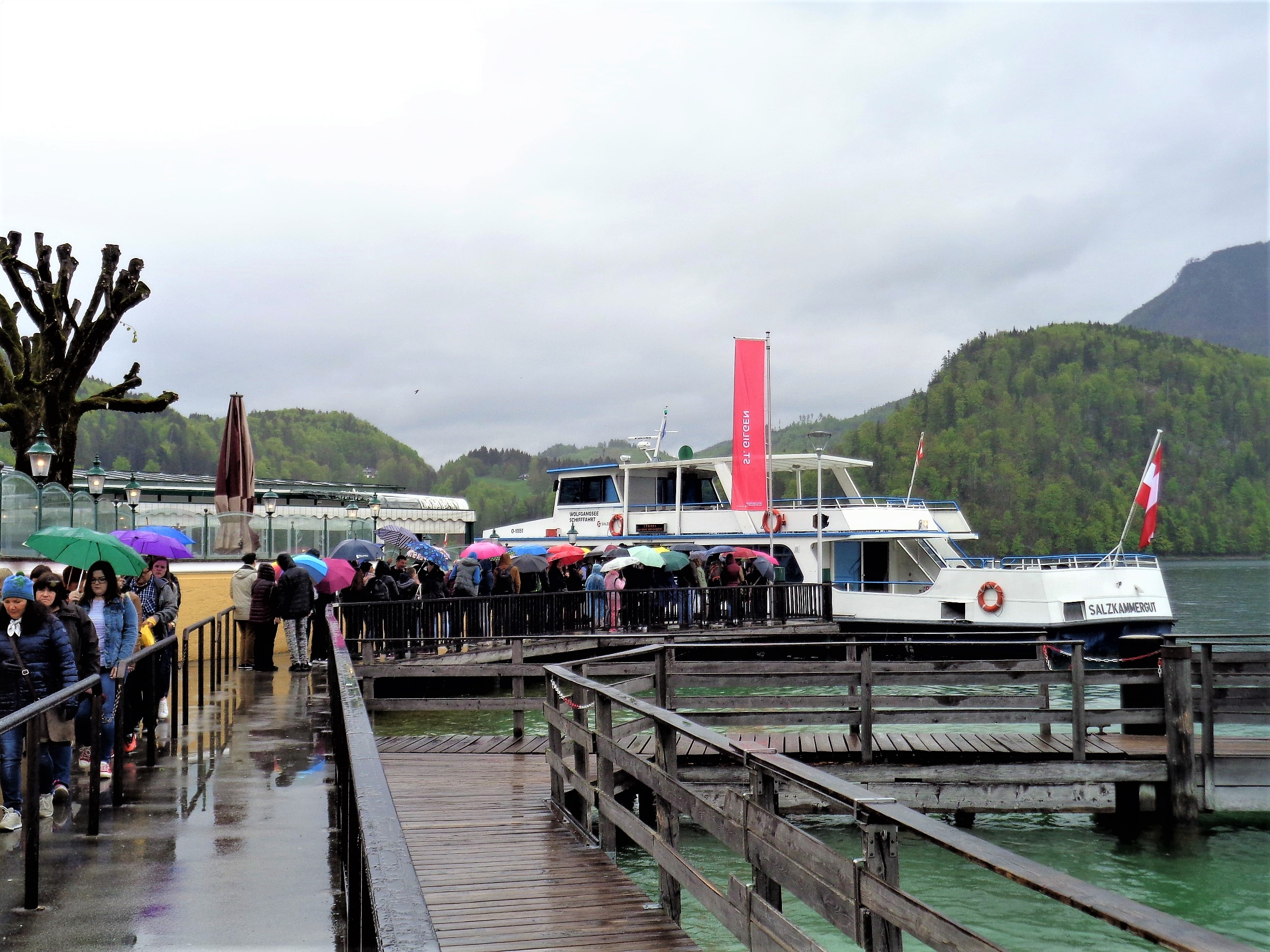
Quay on Lake Wolfgang

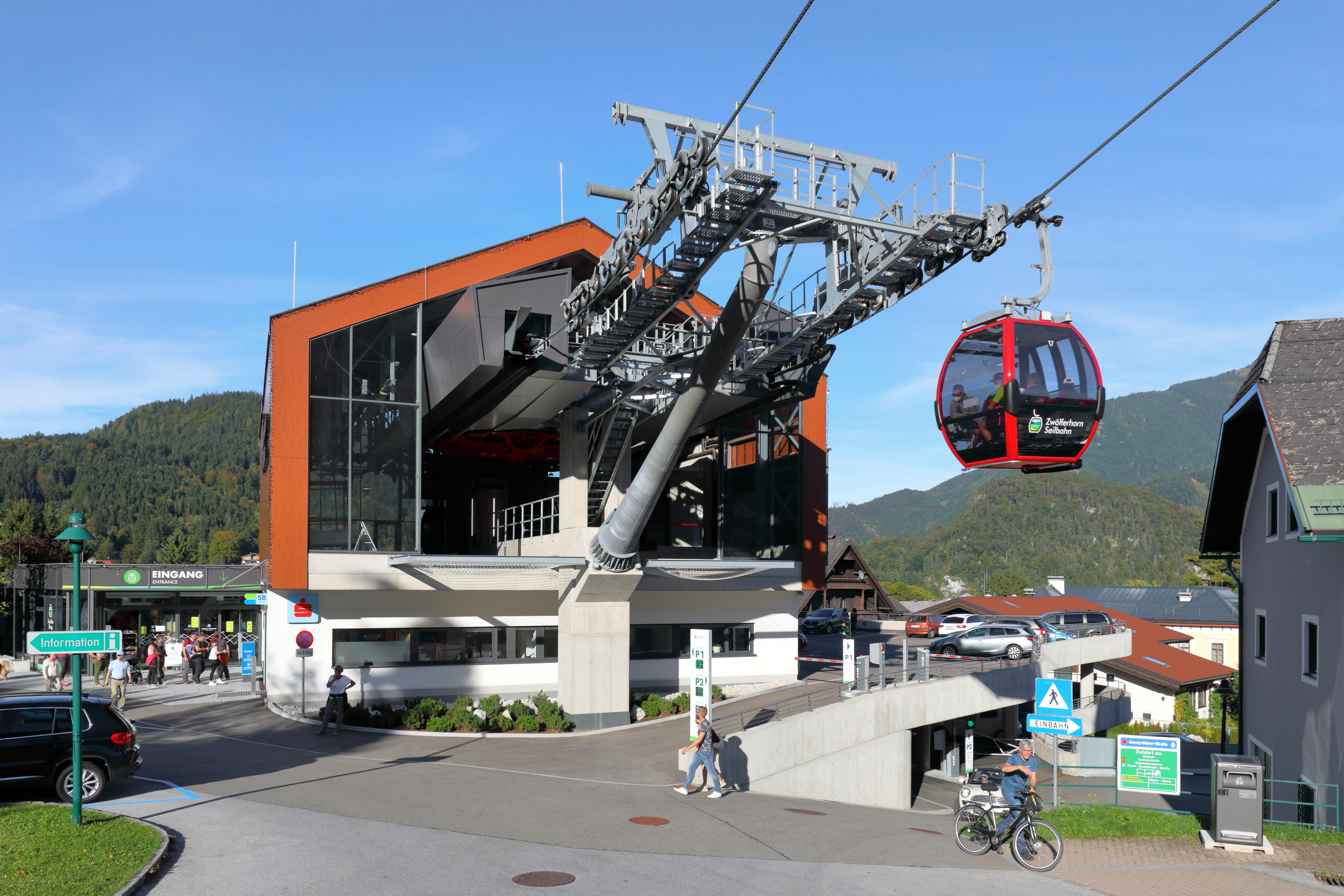
Valley station of the Zwölferhorn cableway

== Notable people ==
- Anna Maria Walburga Pertl (1720–1778), mother of Wolfgang Amadeus Mozart
- August Brunetti-Pisano (1870–1943), composer
- Brother David Steindl-Rast (1926–present), Benedictine monk and interfaith lecturer on peace and gratitude
- Michael Jeannée (born 1943), journalist
- Miguel Herz-Kestranek (born 1948), actor
- Hubert Raudaschl (1942–2025), Olympic sailor and sailboat manufacturer
- Helmut Kohl (1930–2017), the German chancellor used to reside in the town during summer

== See also ==
- Salzkammergut
- Wolfgangsee
- Salzkammergut-Lokalbahn
- Schafberg
- Schafbergbahn
- Brunnwinkl
