= Brunnwinkl =

- Hamlet
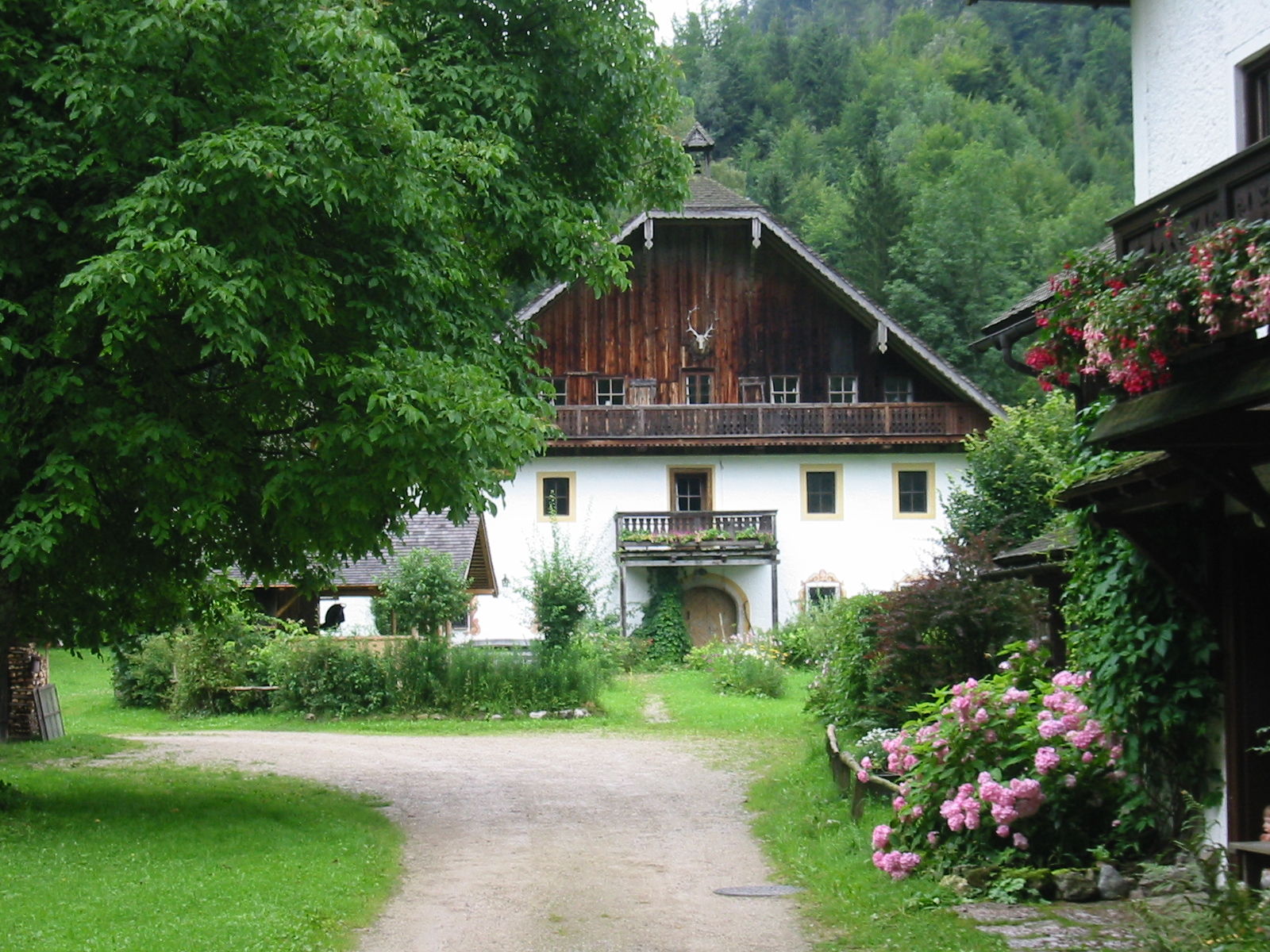
- Mill in Brunnwinkl

- Location within Austria
- Coordinates: 47°46′27″N 13°22′35″E
- Country: Austria
- State: Salzburg
- District: Salzburg-Umgebung

Population
  - Total: 0
- Time zone: UTC+1 (CET)
  - Summer (DST): UTC+2 (CEST)

Brunnwinkl is a hamlet at the edge of Wolfgangsee close to St. Gilgen in Salzkammergut, Austria. It is perhaps best known as the place where ethologist Karl von Frisch decoded the waggle dance of honey bees.
