= St. Gilgen International School =

Coordinates: 47.7671°N 13.3669°E

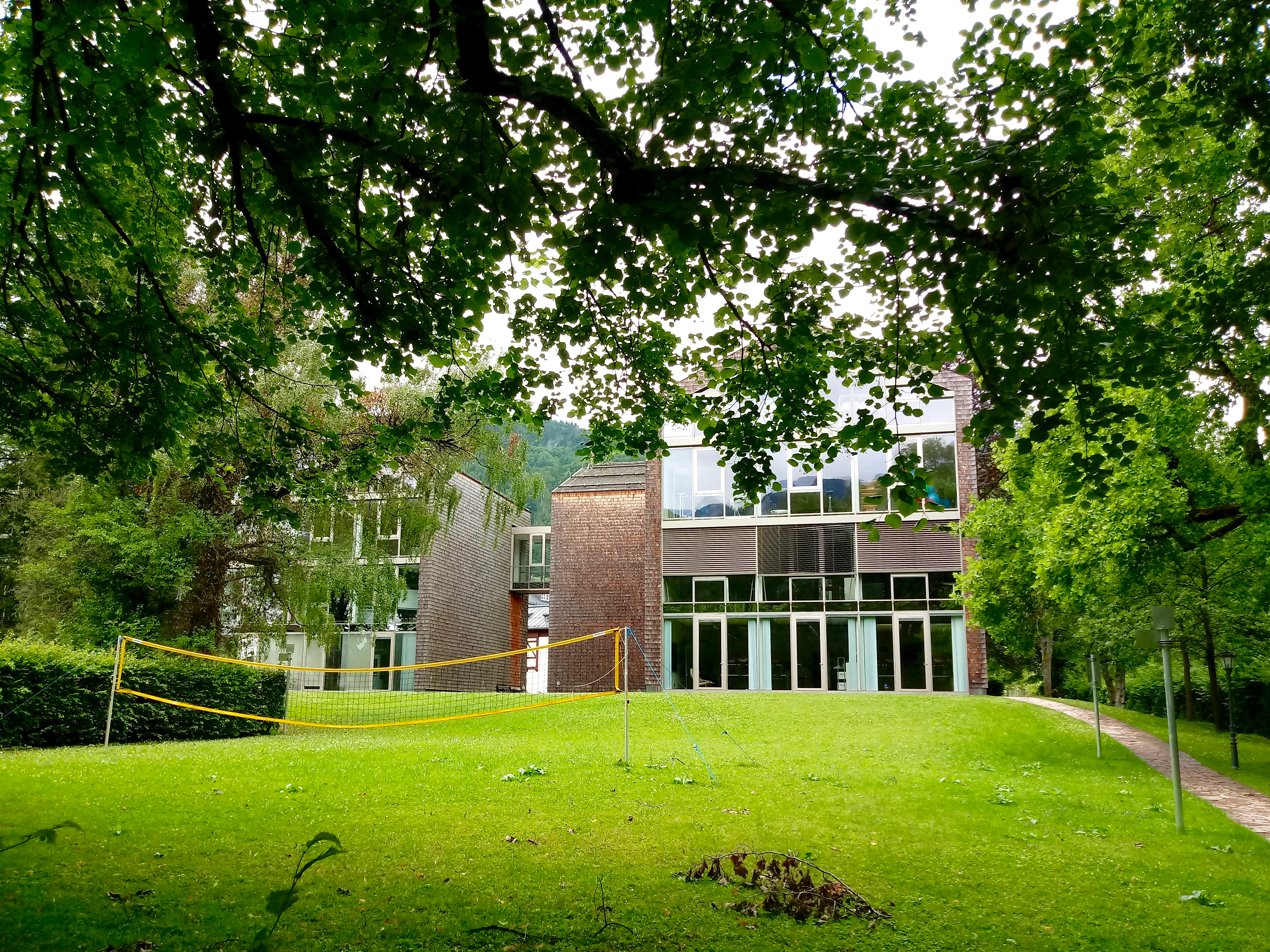
- St. Gilgen, Salzburg; Austria

Information
- Type: Private
- Motto: "Every child has a talent and we will develop it."
- Established: 2008
- Principal: Martina Moetz
- Enrollment: 225
- Campus: Village
- Color: Blue/Yellow
- Website: http://www.stgis.at

St. Gilgen International School (StGIS) is a co-educational boarding and day school for students between the ages of 9 and 18. The school offers a primary and middle school curriculum leading to the highly regarded International Baccalaureate Diploma Programme qualification in the final two years. The language of instruction is English.

StGIS is a member of:

- the Council of International Schools,
- Educational Collaborative of International Schools (ECIS),
- the Swiss Group of International Schools (SGIS)
- and is a registered Cambridge international center(CIC)

== History ==
St. Gilgen International School was founded in 2008 by the Austrian architect and entrepreneur Alexander Serda and since then has grown steadily to the current enrolment of 225. The current capacity is 250. In 2013 the school was taken over by the British-American investment firm HIG Capital who also acquired the Italian International Schools of Europe Group. After a short period of self managed administration proceedings in April 2016, and brief negotiations with the nearby energy drinks company Red Bull, the school was taken over by the newly founded St. Gilgen International School Privatstiftung on May 15, 2016, a non profit foundation which was founded by parents and has since then been managed by the board members Gert Fahrnberger, Christian Dreyer and Andrea von Baumbach. The purpose of the foundation is to support and further develop the school.

Since April 2017 the school maintains a cooperation with the pre-college programme of the Mozarteum University of Salzburg.

The school was built on a site beside Lake Wolfgang which previously contained green fields and some derelict villas. The villas were renovated and five teaching buildings were constructed over 12 months during 2007 and 2008.

In 2026, St. Gilgen International School (StGIS) became part of the Cognita international schools group.

== Location ==
The school is located in St. Gilgen on Lake Wolfgang 30 minutes' drive from Salzburg, Austria

== Campus ==
The school's campus is in a lakefront park with renovated historic and newly built academic and boarding facilities, in the centre of the village of St. Gilgen.

There are three boarding houses for students situated in different locations around the village. The boarding houses were all originally hotels.

== Academics ==
Academic courses are taught in English. StGIS offers a Primary School programme which spans Grades 4-6 and a Middle School programme which includes Grades 7-10. Grade 10 students study the Pre-IB curriculum. The International Baccalaureate Diploma (IB) programme is taught in Grades 11 and 12.

Primary School and Middle School students study a range of courses including English language and literature, German, World Studies, Sciences, Mathematics, the Arts, Music, and Movement & Wellbeing. Middle School students also study an additional modern language.

Currently, St. Gilgen International School offers the International Baccalaureate (IB) Diploma Programme, which consists of six subjects (three at Higher Level and three at Standard Level), the Extended Essay (EE), Theory of Knowledge (TOK), and Creativity, Activity and Service (CAS).

The following subjects are offered:

- Group 1: Language and Literature: English A Language and Literature; German A Language and Literature
- Group 2: Language Acquisition: English; French; German; Spanish; self-taught languages (for example Italian, Russian and Mandarin Chinese)
- Group 3: Individuals and Societies: Economics; Geography; Global Politics; History; Psychology
- Group 4: Experimental Sciences: Biology; Chemistry; Design Technology; Physics
- Group 5: Mathematics: Mathematics: Applications and Interpretation; Mathematics: Analysis and Approaches
- Group 6: The Arts and additional options: Music; Visual Arts; Theatre; additional subjects from Groups 3 or 4

Theory of Knowledge (TOK), the Extended Essay (EE) and Creativity, Activity and Service (CAS) are compulsory components of the diploma programme.

== Co-curricular activities ==
In addition to the academic programme, StGIS has a wide variety of outdoor and cultural activities as a part of the curriculum. Outdoor activities include alpine skiing, archery, canoeing and kayaking, cliff jumping, climbing, glacier hiking, ice skating, mountaineering, mountain biking, sledding, ski touring, snowshoeing, stand up paddle boarding, water skiing, cross-country skiing, badminton, basketball, golf, gym, horse riding, football, rowing, ski fitness, squash, swimming, tennis, trail running, volleyball and yoga.

Cultural activities such as musical theatre, drama, art & design, music instruction, photography, classical dancing and stage production are all available to students. Throughout the academic year, the Arts Faculty take students on educational trips with a creative focus to museums and galleries in cities across Europe.

St. Gilgen International School also runs a programme of expeditions. These have included trekking the Silk Road in China, climbing Mont Blanc to the summit, working at an orphanage in Tanzania, kayaking in the Croatian islands and climbing volcanoes in Nicaragua.

== International Community ==
There are about 227 students (2025/26), coming from more than 35 different nations around the world. About 47% of the student body originates from Austria and Germany. The other largest groups of students are from the UK, USA and Eastern Europe. Additionally, there are smaller numbers of students from the Middle East, Africa, and Asia.

Faculty and staff are also international and mostly native speakers of the English language.
