= Bruni =

Bruni can refer to:

- Bruni (surname)
- Bruni, Texas
- Bruni (horse), an Irish-bred Thoroughbred racehorse
- Bruni Olympic .380 BBM blank firing revolver
- a character from Frozen 2

== See also ==
- Brunei
- Bruno (disambiguation)
