= Pierre Bruneau =

Pierre Bruneau may refer to:

- Pierre Bruneau (journalist) (born 1952), Canadian journalist and news anchor
- Pierre Bruneau (politician) (1761–1820), merchant and political figure in Lower Canada
- Pierre Bruneau (racing driver) (born 1961), in events such as the 2010 24 Hours of Le Mans
