= Bruno Jura Hound =

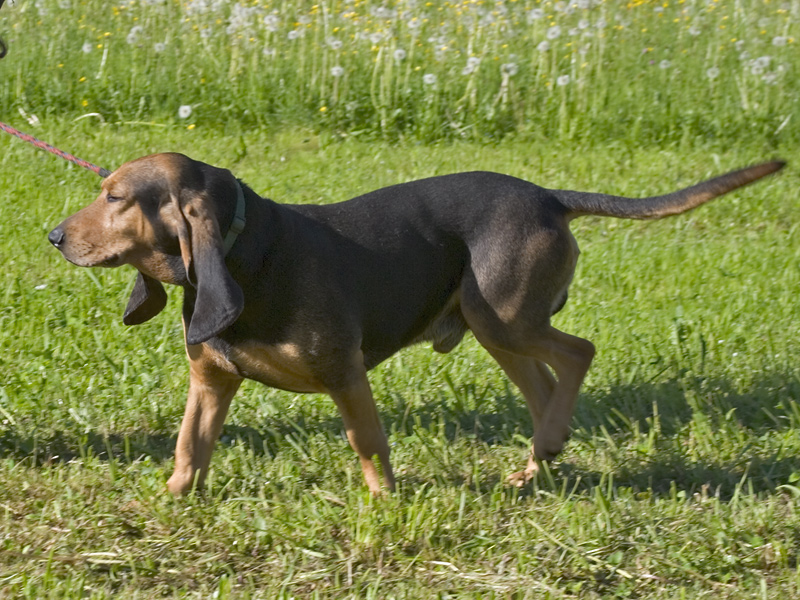
- A black and tan Bruno Jura Hound
- Other names: Bruno Jura Laufhund
- Origin: Switzerland
- Breed status: Not recognised as a breed by any major kennel club.
Traits
- Height: 43–59 cm (17–23 in)
- Weight: 15–20 kg (33–44 lb)
- Coat: Short
- Colour: Black and tan Two-tone brown

The Bruno Jura Hound is a breed of scenthound from the Jura Mountains on the French-Swiss border.

== Overview ==
The Bruno Jura Hound is a medium-sized hound; it is usually black and tan or two-tone brown in colour with no white at all. The Bruno Jura Hound closely resembles the larger St. Hubert Jura Hound, to which it is closely related, although it has less pendulous dewlaps.

Both the Bruno Jura and St. Hubert Jura Hounds are closely related to nearby French hounds; all are believed to have descended from the St. Hubert Hound. The breed is found on both sides of the French-Swiss border; some writers believe it is French in origin, but most describe it as Swiss.

The Bruno Jura Hound is used by hunters in the Jura Mountains on the Swiss side of the French-Swiss border to hunt fox, hare and small deer; it is said to be a very capable follower of faint scents, making it highly valued by local hunters when hunting in the arduous terrain in the area.

== See also ==
- List of dog breeds
