= Therese Brunetti =

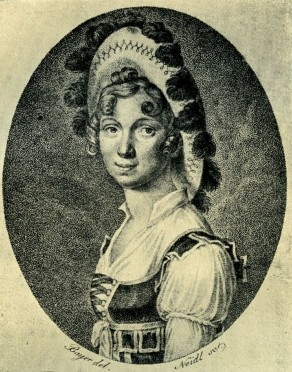
Brunetti, Therese

Therese Brunetti née Frey (25 December 1782- 20 May 1864) was a stage actress and ballet dancer.

She was engaged at the Estates Theatre in Prague in 1798-1833, where she belonged to the theatre's star attractions, noted for her grace and roles as heroine and tragedienne, and referred to by critics as the best actress in Prague (1807).

She was married to Giacomo Brunetti and known for her relationship to Carl Maria von Weber.
