= Bruno, West Virginia =

- Census-designated place
- Location within West Virginia Location within the United States
- Coordinates: 37°41′26″N 81°52′08″W
- Country: United States
- State: West Virginia
- County: Logan

Area
  - Total: 1.323 sq mi (3.43 km^{2})
  - Land: 1.299 sq mi (3.36 km^{2})
  - Water: 0.024 sq mi (0.062 km^{2})
- Elevation: 755 ft (230 m)

Population (2020)
  - Total: 483
  - Density: 372/sq mi (144/km^{2})
- Time zone: UTC-5 (Eastern (EST))
  - Summer (DST): UTC-4 (EDT)
- ZIP code: 25611
- Area codes: 304 & 681
- GNIS feature ID: 1553999

Bruno is a census-designated place (CDP) in Logan County, West Virginia, United States. Bruno is located on the west bank of the Guyandotte River, 3.5 miles (5.6 km) south of Man. Bruno has a post office with ZIP code 25611. As of the 2020 census, its population was 483 (down from 544 at the 2010 census).
