= Bruno the bear =

Bruno the bear may refer to:

- Bear JJ1, a European brown bear who made the news in 2006
- Bruno (bear actor), a trained American black bear who played Gentle Ben
- Name of the Brown Bears, mascot of Brown University
- A character on the TV series Edward and Friends
- A character in the cartoon Big Top Bunny
- A character in the game "Toon Blast"
