= Federica Brunetti =

Italian professional basketball player (born 1988)

Federica Brunetti (born October 6, 1988) is an Italian professional basketball player.

She is a power forward and she has played in CUS Cagliari Pallacanestro, in A1 league.
