= August Brunetti-Pisano =

Austrian composer

August Brunetti-Pisano (24 October 1870 - 1 September 1943), was an Austrian composer.

Brunetti-Pisano was born in St. Gilgen. He was Georg Trakl's piano teacher. He was for a long time the president of the "Kunstgesellschaft Pan" (Society of Arts Pan) in Salzburg. In 1926 the "Brunetti-Gesellschaft" (Brunetti Society) was founded in Vienna.

As a Late Romantic he struggled all his life for recognition, but with little success. Since 2005 he has been rediscovered, especially in Salzburg, where he died.

== Works ==
- Präludium for the drama Die versunkene Glocke by Gerhart Hauptmann (1897)
- Venezianische Symphonie (1904, won an award)
- Peter Schlemihl (opera based on the fairy tale Peter Schlemihls wundersame Geschichte by Adelbert von Chamisso, was presented on stage in 1908 at Ludwigsburg)
- Das klagende Lied (1908, opera based on the fairy tale Der singende Knochen from the Brothers Grimm's collection; not to be confused with the cantata Das klagende Lied by Gustav Mahler which is another adaptation based on the same fairy tale)
- Liebesopfer (opera)
- Djenaneh (opera)
- Österreichischer Bundesmarsch (Austrian Federal March)
- Intermezzo for violin and organ (1926)
- Dem Vaterland for male choir (1927, dedicated to the Austrian National Library)
- Romanze for violin and piano (1928, Brunetti-Gesellschaft, Salzburg/Vienna)
- Dithyrambe for choir (1928, text by Klopstock)
- Symphony in D Major
