= Bruno (dog) =

Italian sniffer dog (died 2025)

- Species: Canis lupus familiaris (dog)
- Breed: bloodhound
- Sex: male
- Died: 4 July 2025 (aged 7)
- Cause of death: Canicide
- Nation from: Italian
- Occupation: Police dog

Bruno (born 2017 or 2018; died 4 July 2025) was a bloodhound who was hailed as a hero for finding nine missing people during his career as a police sniffer dog, and was once honoured by Italy's prime minister. Bruno was found dead on 4 July 2025 after being fed a sausage filled with nails.

== Police service ==
Over the course of Bruno's life, he received multiple awards for his service. He was best known for finding missing children and patients with Alzheimer's disease. On 15 July, 2024 Giorgia Meloni, Italy's prime minister, awarded Bruno for his work

== Death ==
Bruno was found dead on 4 July 2025 after being fed a sausage filled with nails. In an interview with the Associated Press, the dog's trainer, Arcangelo Caressa, hypothesized that the killing was revenge for his work rescuing animals from dog-fighting rings.

On 5 July 2025, Meloni wrote a post on X expressing her sadness about his passing, calling the culprit of his murder 'vile', 'cowardly', and 'unacceptable.' Journalist Caterina Iannaci for Corriere di Siena wrote that violence against dogs had been on the rise in Italy in the years leading up to Bruno's killing. A 2025 law spearheaded by and named after legislator Michela Vittoria Brambilla increased criminal penalties for animal cruelty in Italy, and prosecutors investigated its applicability in Bruno's case.
