= SKGLB Museum =

Railway museum in Austria

Coordinates: 47.830669°N 13.350228°E

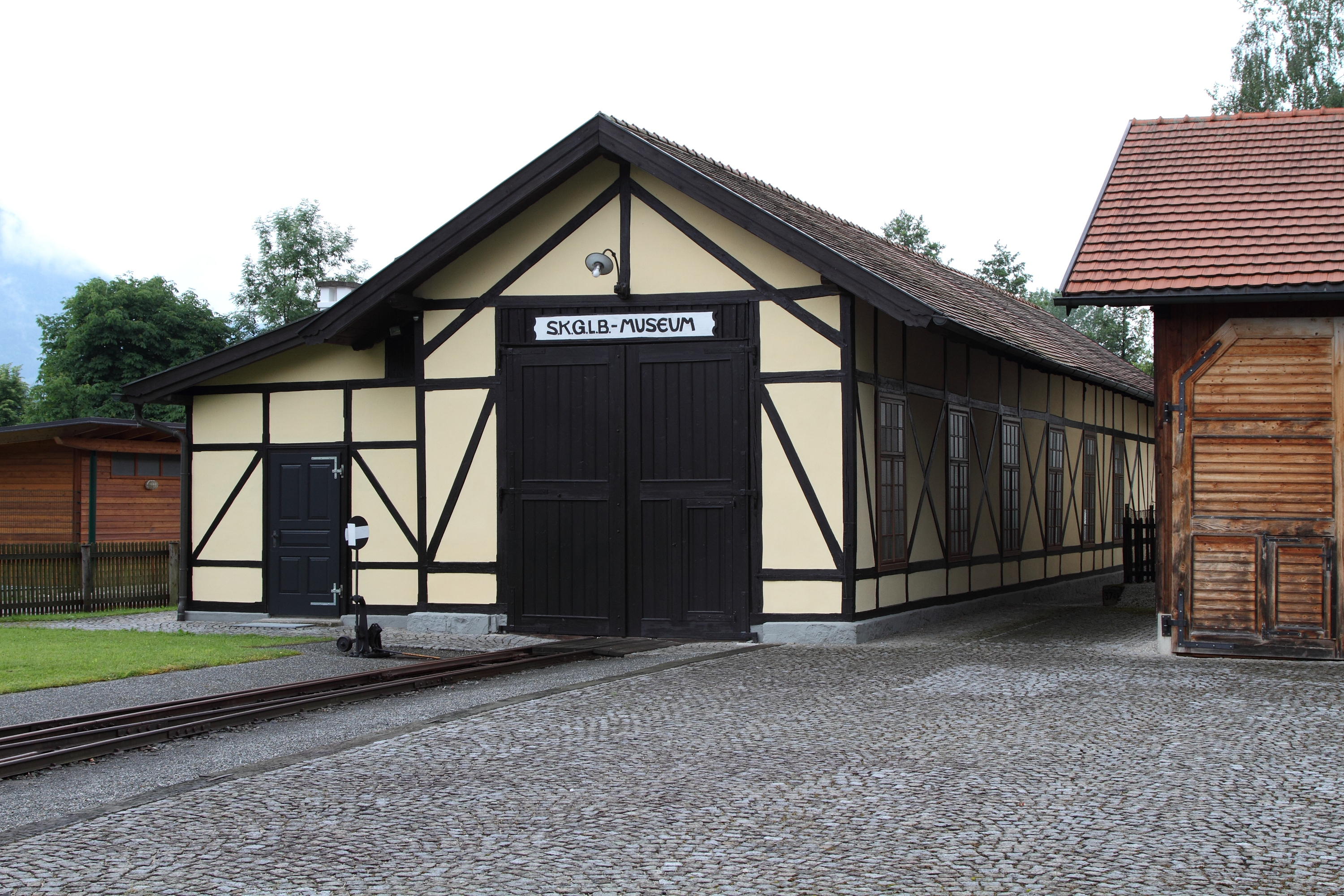
Historic engine shed at Mondsee, today the home of the SKGLB museum.

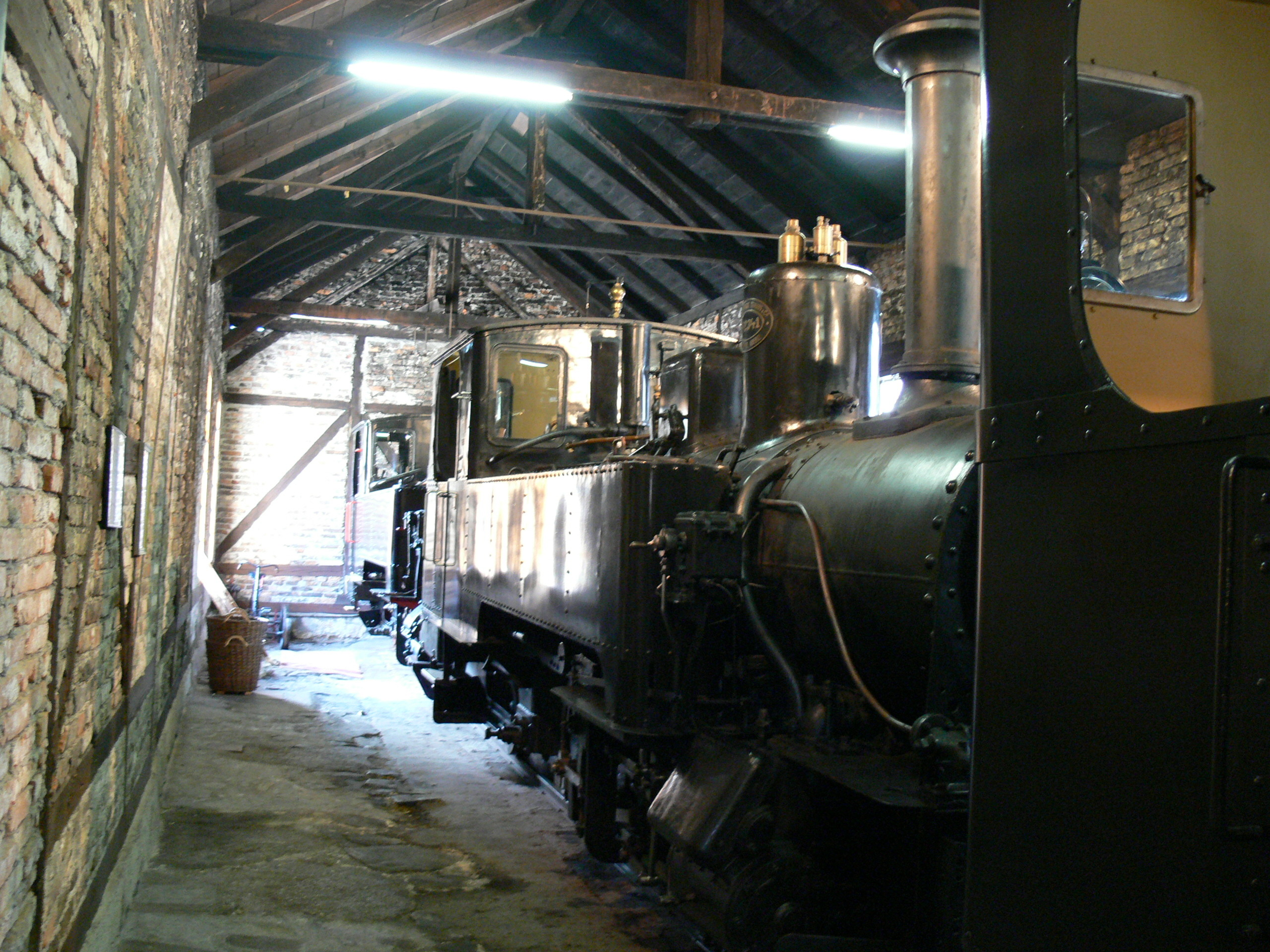
Steam locomotives in the shed

The SKGLB-museum is a railway museum in Mondsee in Upper Austria. It shows relics of the 1957 closed Salzkammergut-Lokalbahn (abbreviation: SKGLB) that was a railway line in 760 mm (2 ft 5 15/16 in) gauge track from Salzburg to Bad Ischl with a branch to Mondsee - a town located at the lake Mondsee. The engine shed of the terminal station at Mondsee is the only preserved engine shed of this line. It has been converted to a museum about the line and its history and contains a collection of original vehicles, photographs and a model layout of the SKGLB's Mondsee branch. The line was privately owned firstly by the Bavarian company "Lokalbahn Aktiengesellschaft" known as LAG. This company owned the cog railway from St. Wolfgang to the Schafberg too which is still in operation.

== History of the Salzkammergut Lokalbahn ==
Opening dates:

- 08/05/1890 Ischl - Strobl (9 km or 5.6 mi)
- 07/28/1891 Salzburg - St. Lorenz - Mondsee (32 km or 20 mi)
- 06/20/1893 Strobl - St. Lorenz (22 km or 14 mi)
- 07/03/1897 Ischl Lokalbahnhof - Staatsbahnhof

closed 1957
