= Mont Blanc massif =

Mountain range in the Alps

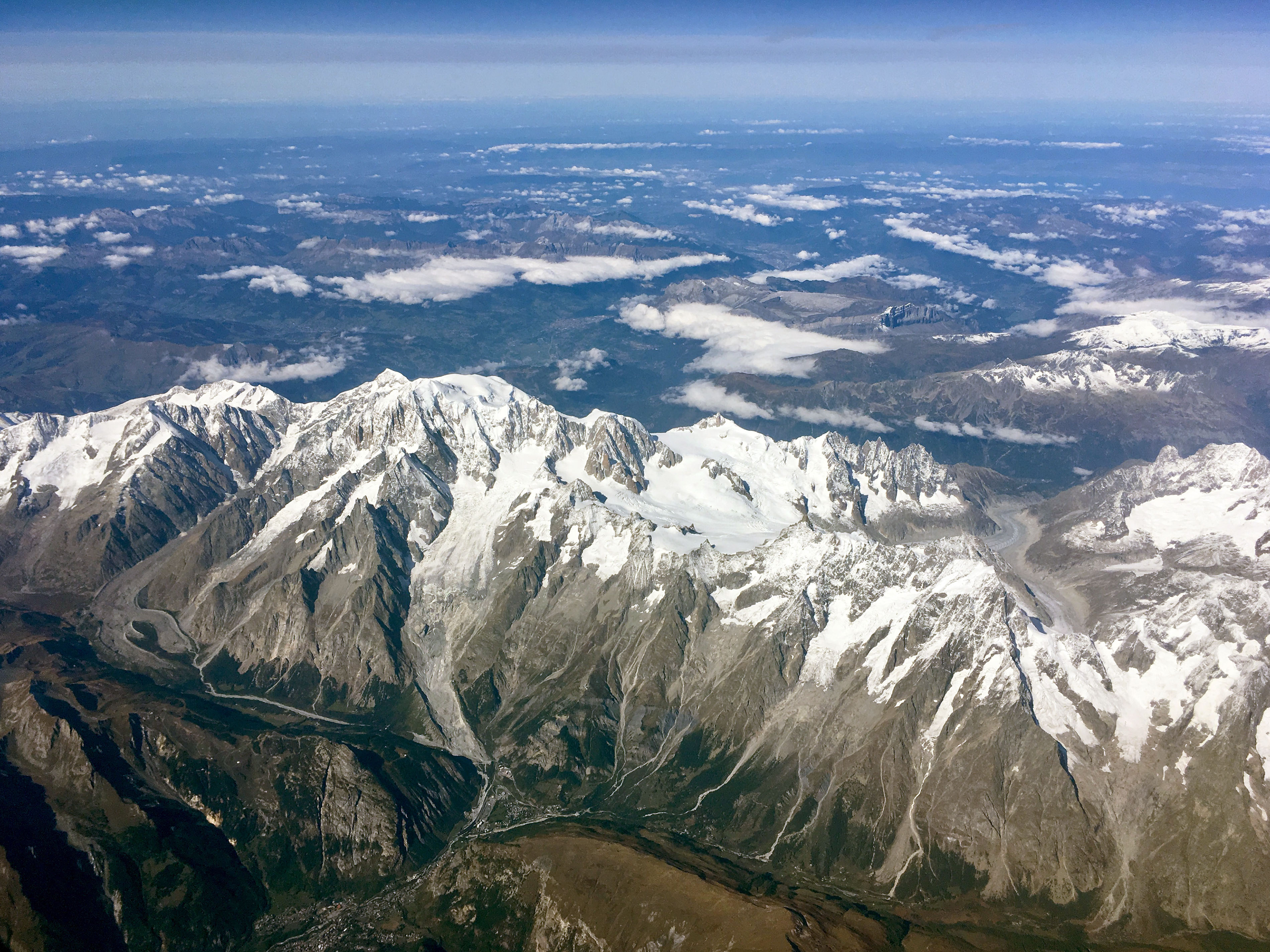
- Aerial view of western half of the Mont Blanc massif, seen from the Italian side.

Highest point
- Peak: Mont Blanc (Italian: Monte Bianco)
- Elevation: 4,808.73 metres (15,776.7 ft)
- Coordinates: 45°50′01″N 06°51′54″E

Dimensions
- Length: 46 km (29 mi)
- Width: 20 km (12 mi)

Geography
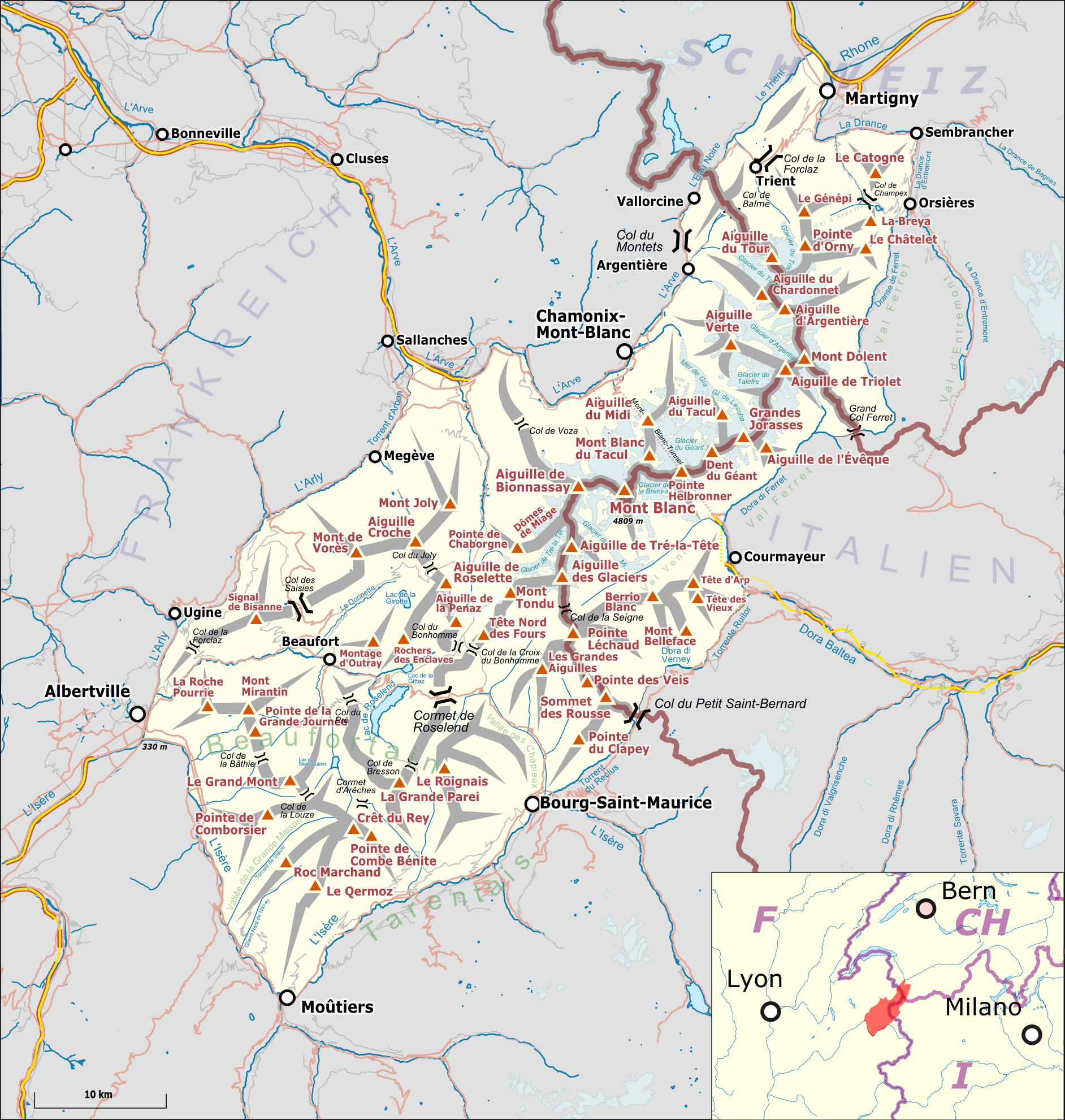
- Map of Mont Blanc massif and its location (red)
- Countries: France; Italy; Switzerland
- Parent range: Alps

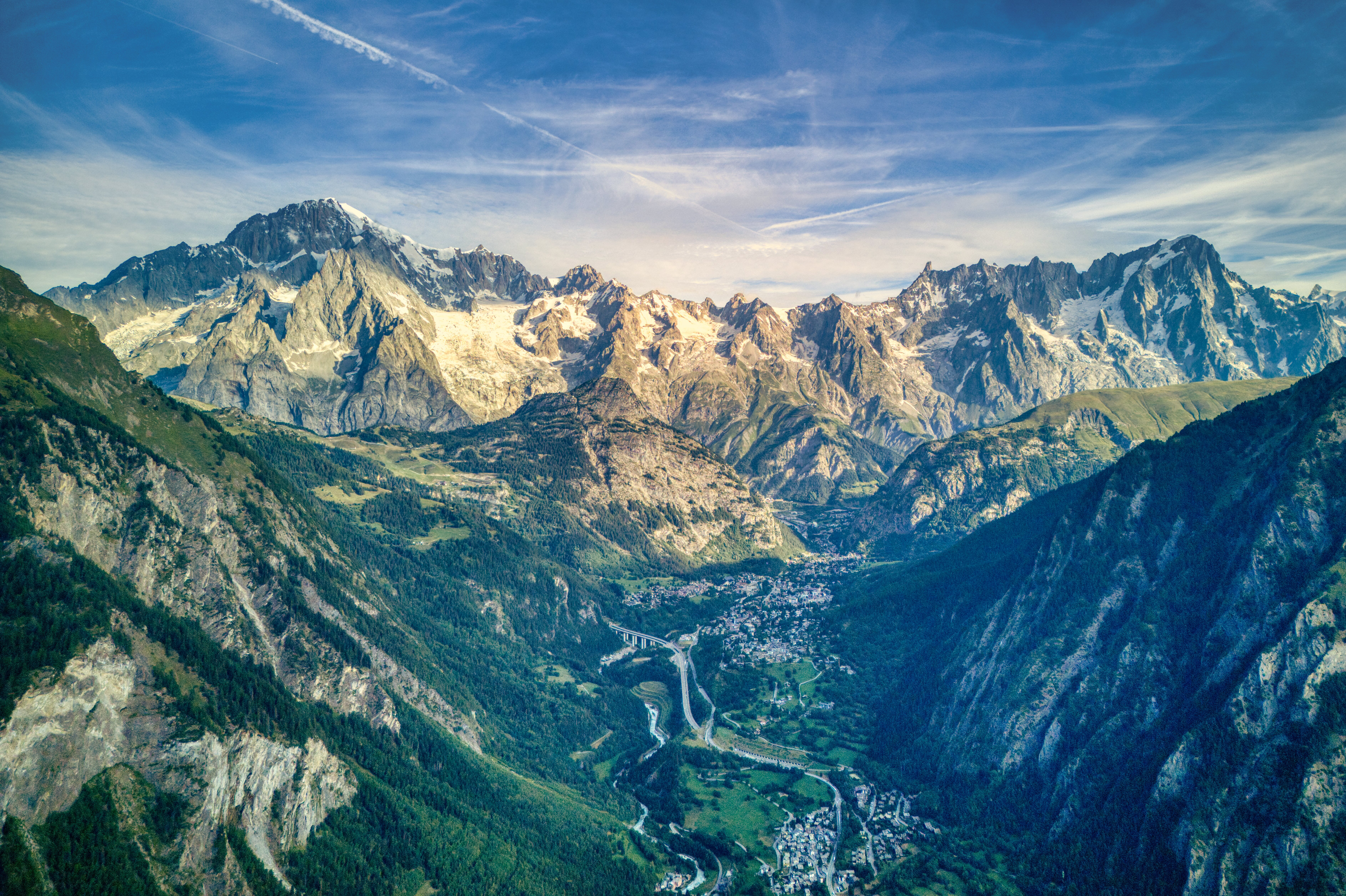
View of the massif from Colle San Carlo

Aerial view from the south

The Mont Blanc massif (French: Massif du Mont-Blanc [masif dy mɔ̃ blɑ̃]; Italian: Massiccio del Monte Bianco) is a mountain range in the Alps, located mostly in France and Italy, but also straddling Switzerland at its northeastern end. It contains eleven major independent summits, each over 4,000 metres (13,123 ft) in height. It is named after Mont Blanc (4,808 metres (15,774 ft)), the highest point in western Europe and the European Union. Because of its considerable overall altitude, a large proportion of the massif is covered by glaciers, which include the Mer de Glace and the Miage Glacier – the longest glaciers in France and Italy, respectively.

The massif forms a watershed between the vast catchments of the rivers Rhône and Po, and a tripoint between France, Italy and Switzerland; it also marks the border between two climate regions by separating the northern and western Alps from the southern Alps. The mountains of the massif consist mostly of granite and gneiss rocks and at high altitudes the vegetation is an arctic-alpine flora.

The valleys that delimit the massif were used as communication routes by the Romans until they left around the 5th century AD. The region remained of some military importance through to the mid-20th century. A peasant farming economy operated within these valleys for many centuries until the glaciers and mountains were "discovered" by the outside world in the 18th century. Word of these impressive sights began to spread, and Mont Blanc was first climbed in 1786, marking the start of the sport of mountaineering. The region is now a major tourist destination, drawing in over six million visitors per year. It provides a wide range of opportunities for outdoor recreation and activities such as sight-seeing, hiking, rock climbing, mountaineering and skiing. Around one hundred people a year die across its mountains and, occasionally, bodies have been lost and entombed in its glaciers for decades.

Access into the mountains is facilitated by cable cars, mountain railways and mountain huts which offer overnight refuge to climbers and skiers. The long-distance Tour du Mont Blanc hiking trail circumnavigates the whole massif in an 11-day trek of 170 kilometres (110 mi). The Mont Blanc Tunnel connects the French town of Chamonix on the northern side with the Italian town of Courmayeur in the south. The high mountains have provided many opportunities for scientific research, including neutrino measurements within the tunnel and impact of climate change on its highest slopes. Recent rises in average temperatures have led to significant glacial retreat across the massif and an awareness of the need for better environmental protection, including a call for World Heritage Site status.

== Geography ==
The region of the Mont Blanc massif between Martigny (top), Chamonix (left), and Courmayeur (bottom left). The international tripoint lies at the centre of the map.

The Mont Blanc massif is 46 kilometres (29 mi) long and lies in a southwest to northeasterly direction across the borders of France (Haute-Savoie and Savoie), Italy (Aosta Valley) and Switzerland (western Valais). At its widest point the massif is 20 km (12 mi) across. (Note: Distance measured from valley bottom to valley bottom, from French IGN online map.) The northwestern side of the massif lies mostly within France, and is bounded by the valley of the Arve, containing the towns of Argentière, Chamonix and Les Houches. To the west it is bounded by the Val Montjoie, containing Les Contamines-Montjoie and the river Le Bon Nant which flows northwards to a confluence with the Arve near Saint-Gervais-les-Bains, and onwards to the Rhône. (Note: geographic detail also on French IGN mapping portal)

The southern side of the massif lies mostly within Italy and is bounded by the Val Veny and Val Ferret whose watercourses meet just above Courmayeur. From Courmayeur these waters flow southwards as the Dora Baltea towards Aosta, eventually joining the Po. However, the extreme western end of the southern side of the massif does lie within France and is bounded by the Vallée des Glaciers (which connects to the Val Veny over the watershed of the col de la Seigne), and its waters flow southwards towards the Isère and onwards to the Rhône.

The northernmost section of the massif falls within Switzerland, and is bounded to the east by a separate valley, confusingly also called Val Ferret, and which separates it from the Pennine Alps. Its watercourse, la Dranse de Ferret, flows northwards to join the Rhône at Martigny. The west side of the northern end of the massif is drained by the Trient, also joining the Rhône near Martigny.

The borders of all three countries converge at a tripoint near the summit of Mont Dolent at an altitude of 3,820 metres (12,533 ft). From here the French – Italian border runs southwestwards along a ridge of high summits on the southern side of the massif, many of which are over 4,000 metres (13,123 ft) in height, including the Grandes Jorasses, Rochefort Ridge, Dent du Géant, Mont Maudit, Mont Blanc and its western satellite, the Aiguille de Bionnassay. From here the border turns southwards over the Dômes de Miage and Aiguille de Tré la Tête before dropping down to the Col de la Seigne. North of Mont Dolent the border between France and Switzerland meanders roughly north-northwestwards along a ridge-line of slightly lower peaks, including the Aiguille d'Argentière, the Aiguille du Chardonnet and the Aiguille du Tour, before dropping down to the Col de Balme. The Swiss – Italian border runs southwest from Mont Dolent, down to the twin passes of Col Ferret.

The massif contains 11 main summits over 4,000 metres (13,123 ft) in altitude, as well as numerous subsidiary points above this height. Crowning the massif is Mont Blanc (4,808 metres (15,774 ft)), the highest mountain in the Alps and in western Europe. From the summit of Mont Blanc to the Arve near Chamonix there is a 3,800 metres (12,500 ft) drop in altitude over a distance of just 8 kilometres (5.0 mi). Because of its great elevation, much of the massif is snow- and ice-covered, and has been deeply dissected by glaciers. The Mer de Glace is the longest glacier in the range as well as the longest in France and the second longest in the Alps. The debris-covered Miage Glacier on the southern side of the massif is the longest in Italy. The summit of Mont Blanc is an ice cap whose thickness varies from year to year.

The entire massif can be circumnavigated by the Tour du Mont Blanc, a walking route of approximately 170 kilometres (110 mi). It usually takes around 11 days to complete, but is also used for an annual mountain ultramarathon, with top competitors expected to complete the whole route in less than 21 hours.

The main mountain passes, or cols, that connect different valleys and towns around the Mont Blanc massif are:

- Col du Bonhomme 2,329 m (7,641 ft) (path, links Contamines – Beaufort – Les Chapieux)
- Col de la Seigne 2,516 m (8,255 ft) (path, links Bourg Saint Maurice – Les Chapieux – Courmayeur)
- Col Ferret 2,490 m (8,169 ft) (path, links Courmayeur – Orsières)
- Col de Champex 1,497 m (4,911 ft) and La Forclaz, or Fenêtre d'Arpette 2,655 m (8,711 ft) (path and road, links Orsières - Trient Valley)
- Col de Balme 2,191 m (7,188 ft) (path, links Trient Valley – Chamonix)
- Col de la Forclaz 1,527 m (5,010 ft) (major road, links Chamonix – Martigny)
Main peaks and ridges of the Mont Blanc massif

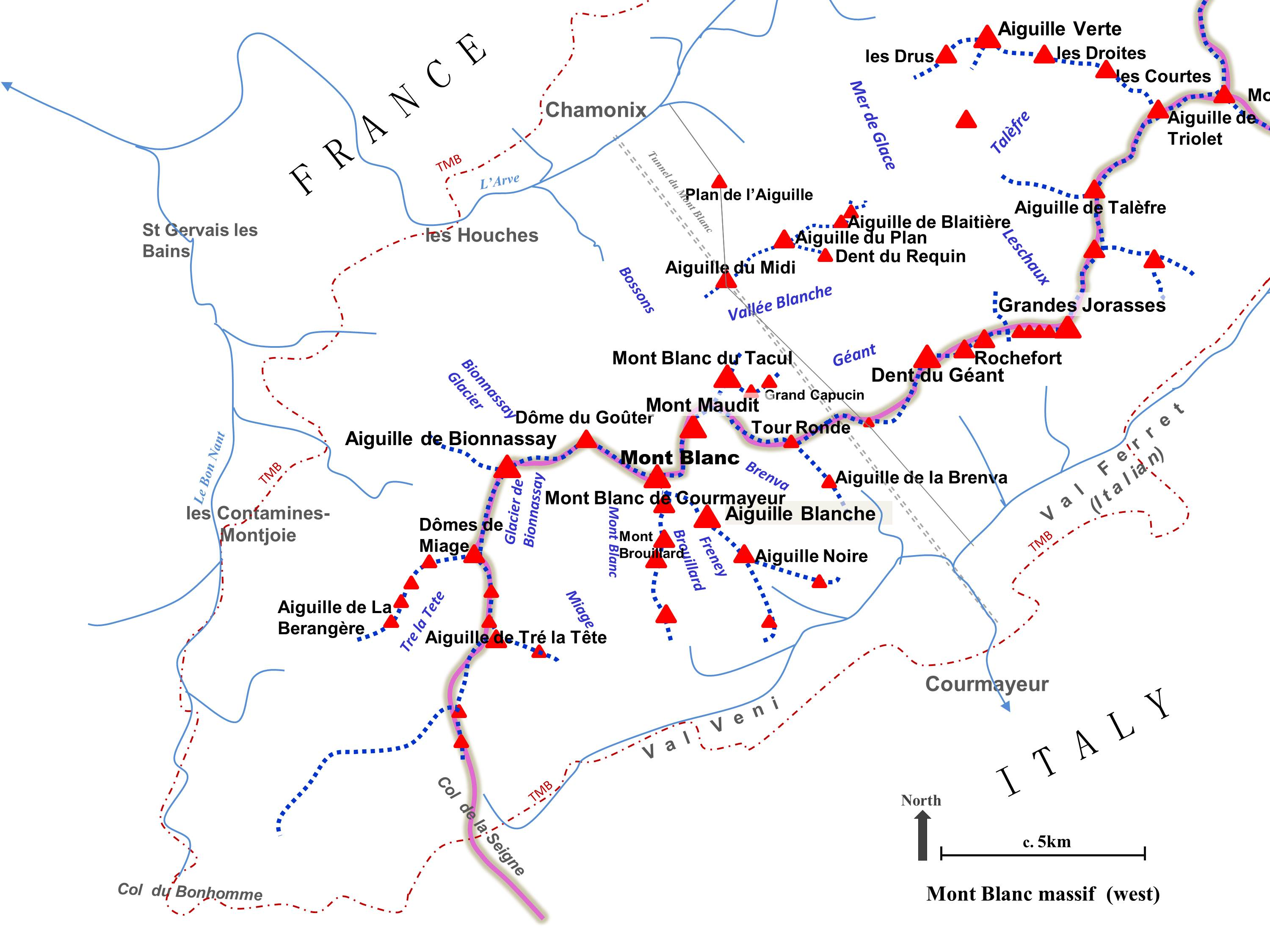
Mont Blanc massif (west)

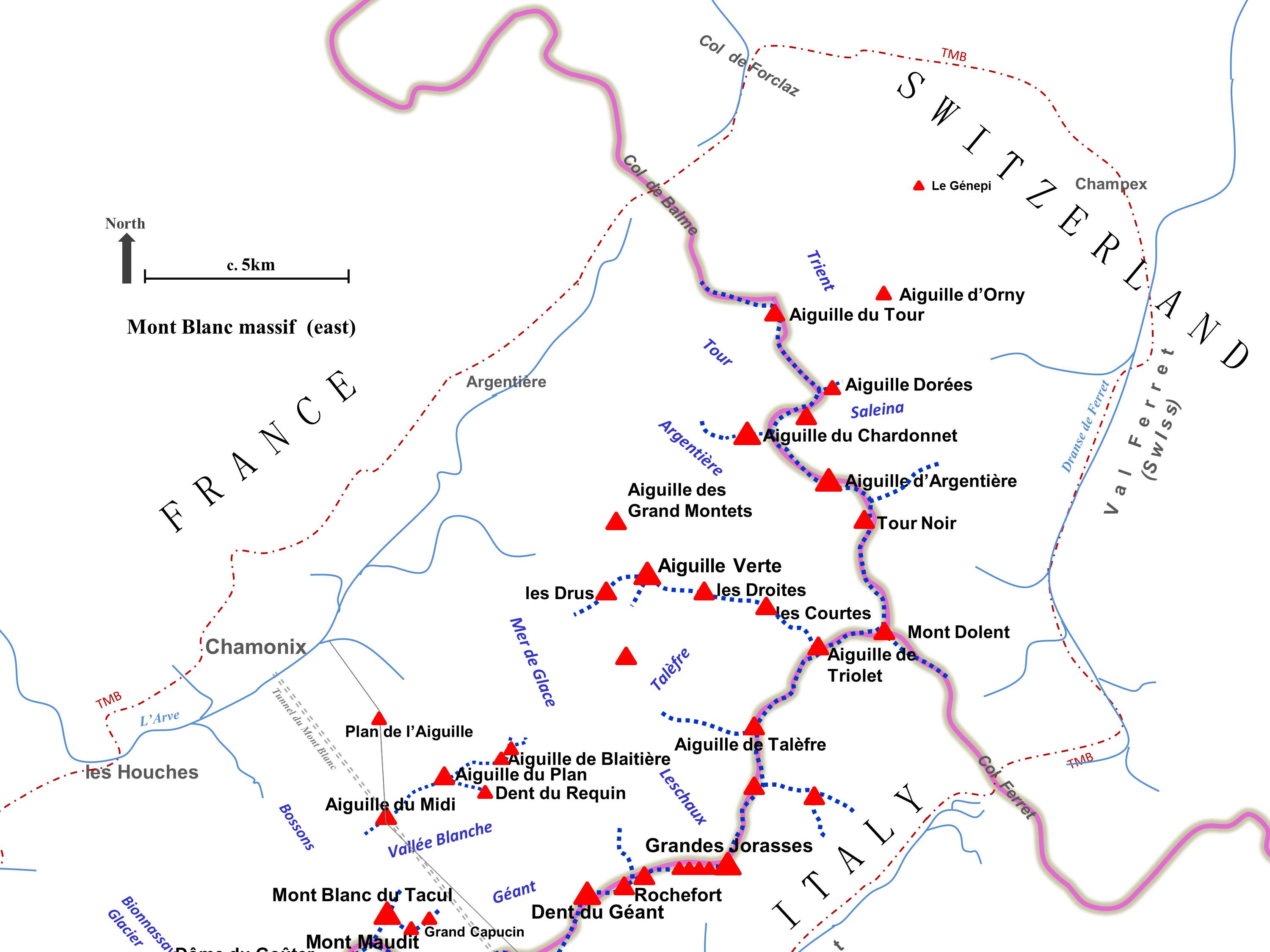
Mont Blanc massif (east)

(National boundaries are shown as broad pink line; the Tour du Mont Blanc route is shown finely dotted in red.)

=== Summits ===
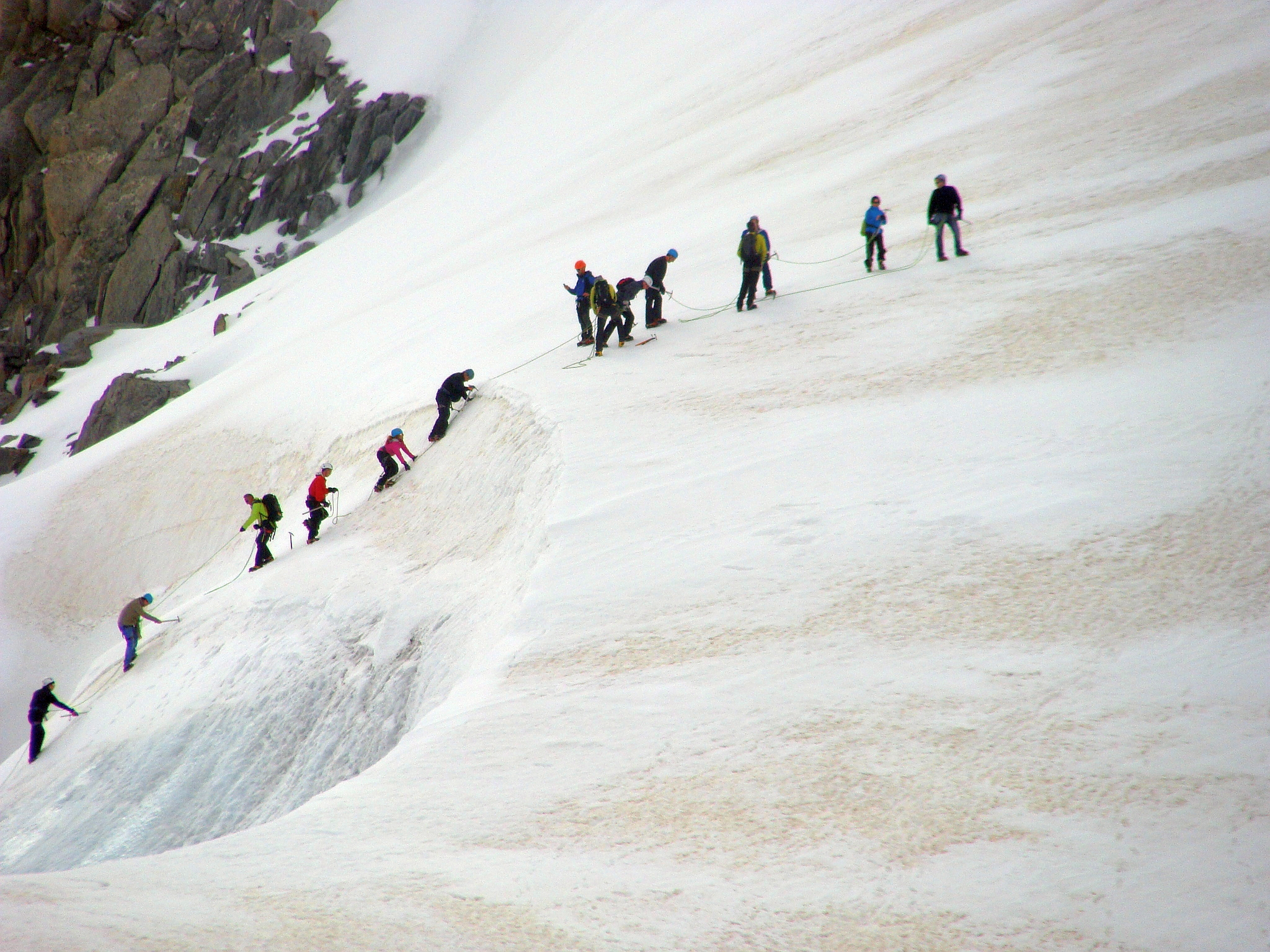
Glacier travel – beginners learning the ropes on the Aiguille des Grands Montets

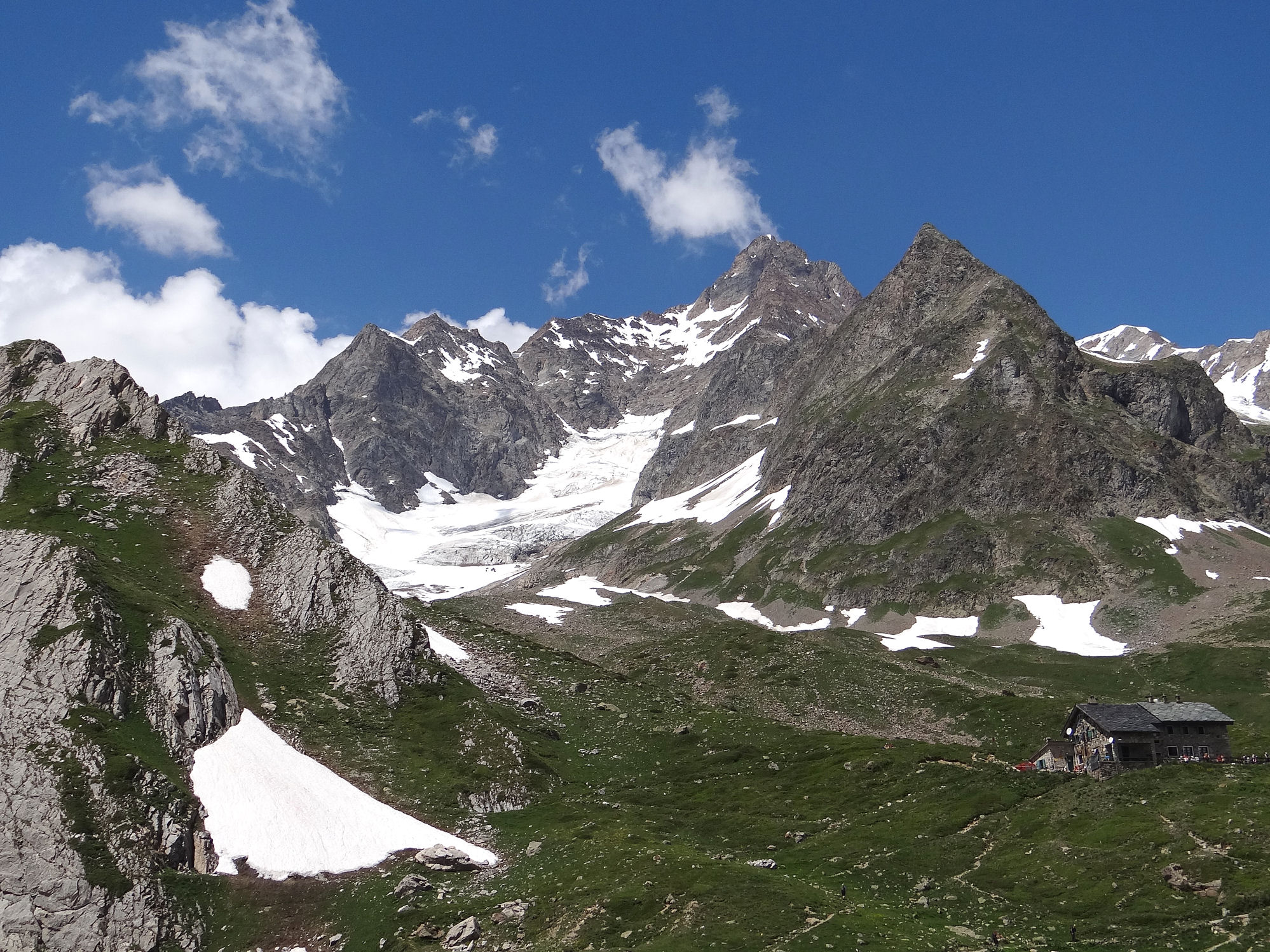
Aiguille des Glaciers summit (3,816 metres (12,520 ft)) bordering Italy and France, the watershed between the rivers Arve, Isère and Dora Baltea, and the site of a fatal plane crash in 1946

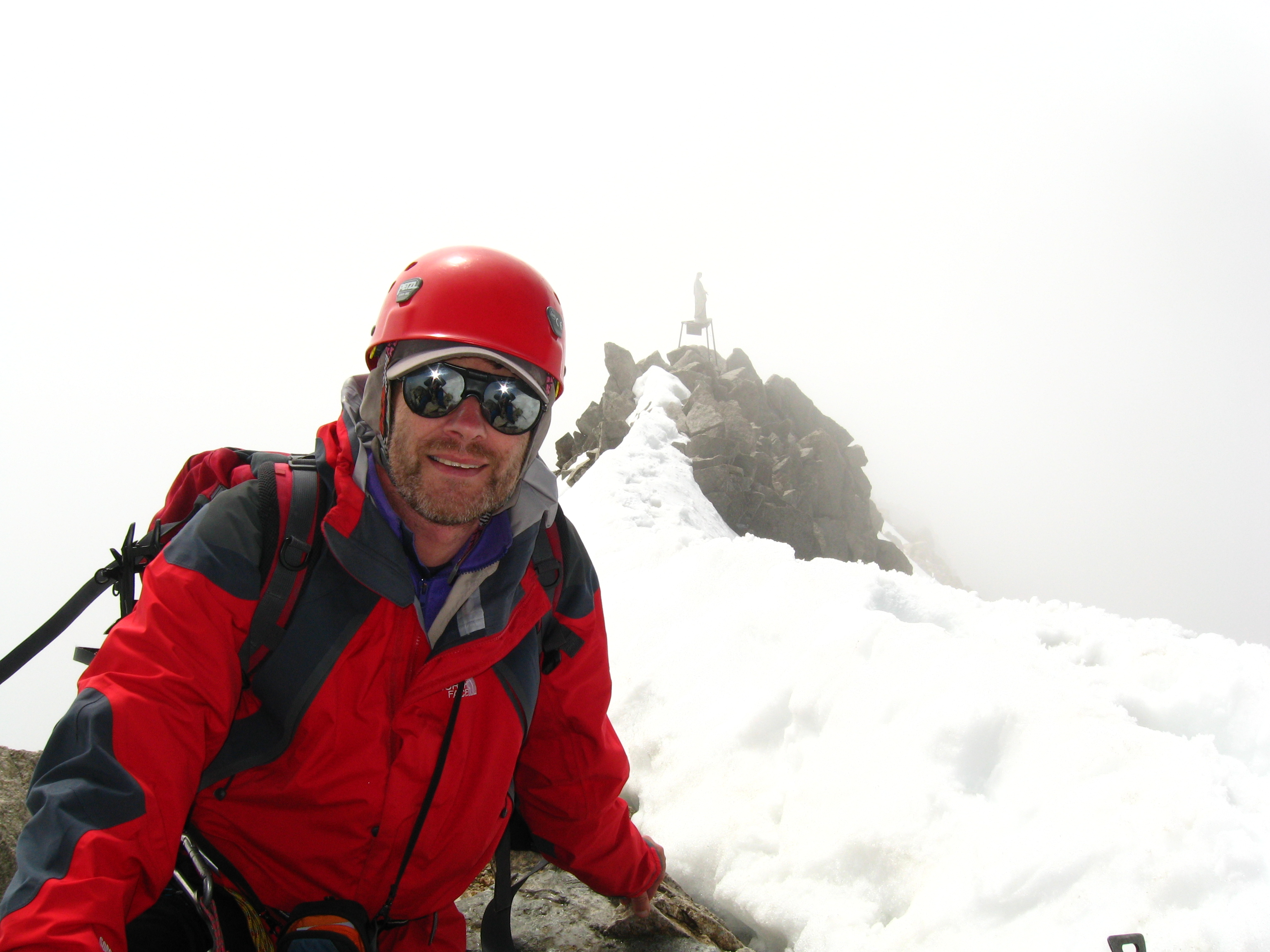
Alpinist on Mont Dolent summit (3,823 metres (12,543 ft)), a tripoint on the border between Italy, Switzerland and France

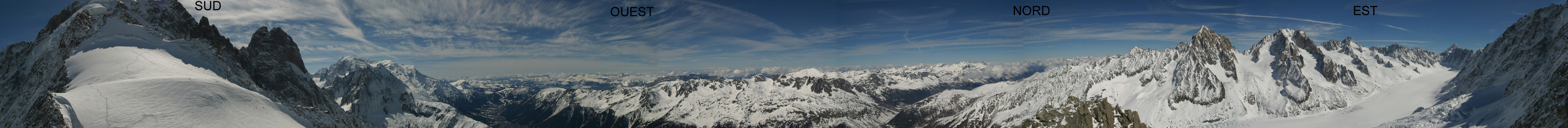
Panorama of the Mont Blanc massif from near the Aiguille des Grands Montets

The Mont Blanc massif includes eleven independent and six subsidiary summits over 4,000 metres (13,123 ft) in height. These (including Mont Blanc) are shared between Italy and France only, the highest in Switzerland being the Aiguille d'Argentière. The massif is amongst the three major subranges of the Alps having the highest concentration of four-thousanders, together with the Pennine Alps and the Bernese Alps.

The first ascent of Mont Blanc in 1786 by Jacques Balmat and Michel Paccard initiated the sport of alpine mountaineering, and it was during the golden age of alpinism (1854–65) and the silver age of alpinism (1865–82) that the majority of the main summits of the massif were first attained. Members of the England-based Alpine Club were instrumental in many of the first ascents, usually accompanied by guides from Chamonix or Courmayeur, such as Michel Croz, Michel Payot and Émile Rey, as well as the Swiss guide, Christian Almer. Across the massif there are now more than two thousand different mountaineering routes to the summits, ranging greatly in both length and difficulty. These attract climbers from all over the world who, unlike the early ascensionists, now have access to numerous climbing guidebooks, modern safety equipment, good information on climbing routes and technical difficulty, as well as weather forecasts and mountain accommodation and food.

Main summits of the Mont Blanc massif. Independent peaks over 4,000 metres are shown in bold. (Note: Summits and heights identified from French IGN online mapping portal)
Name	Height (metres)	Height (feet)
**Mont Blanc**	4,808.73	15,776.7
Mont Blanc de Courmayeur	4,748	15,577
**Mont Maudit**	4,465	14,649
Picco Luigi Amedeo	4,469	14,630
**Dôme du Goûter**	4,304	14,121
**Mont Blanc du Tacul**	4,248	13,937
Grand Pilier d'Angle	4,243	13,921
**Grandes Jorasses**	4,208	13,806
**Aiguille Verte**	4,122	13,524
**Aiguille Blanche de Peuterey**	4,112	13,491
Mont Brouillard	4,069	13,350
**Aiguille de Bionnassay**	4,052	13,294
Pic Eccles	4,041	13,258
**Dôme de Rochefort**	4,015	13,173
**Dent du Géant**	4,013	13,166
Aiguille de Rochefort	4,001	13,127
**Les Droites**	4,000	13,123
Aiguille de Tré la Tête	3,930	12,894
Aiguille d'Argentière	3,898	12,799
Aiguille de Triolet	3,870	12,697
Aiguille du Midi	3,842	12,605
Tour Noir	3,836	12,585
Aiguille du Chardonnet	3,824	12,546
Mont Dolent	3,823	12,543
Aiguille des Glaciers	3,816	12,520

Name	Height (metres)	Height (feet)
Tour Ronde	3,792	12,441
Aiguille Noire de Peuterey	3,773	12,379
Aiguille du Dru	3,754	12,316
Dômes de Miage	3,673	12,051
Aiguille du Plan	3,673	12,051
Aiguilles d'Entrèves	3,600	11,800
Aiguille du Tour	3,540	11,614
Aiguilles Marbrées	3,535	11,598
Aiguilles Dorées	3,514	11,529
Grand Darray	3,514	11,529
Grande Lui	3,509	11,512
Petit Darray	3,508	11,512
Aiguille du Grépon	3,482	11,424
Aiguille des Grands Charmoz	3,445	11,302
Petit Grépillon	3,358	11,017
Le Portalet	3,344	10,971
Pointe d'Orny	3,271	10,732
Mont Tondu	3,196	10,486
Petite Pointe d'Orny	3,187	10,456
Grande Pointe des Planereuses	3,151	10,338
Pointe des Grands	3,101	10,174
Pointe des Plines	3,052	10,013
Pointe des Berons	2,954	9,692
Lancebranlette	2,936	9,633
Le Génépi	2,884	9,462
Pointe des Ecandies	2,873	9,426
Pointe Ronde	2,655	8,711
Catogne	2,598	8,524
La Breya	2,374	7,789

=== Glaciers ===
The Brenva glacier, which descends low down into the Val Veny, Italy

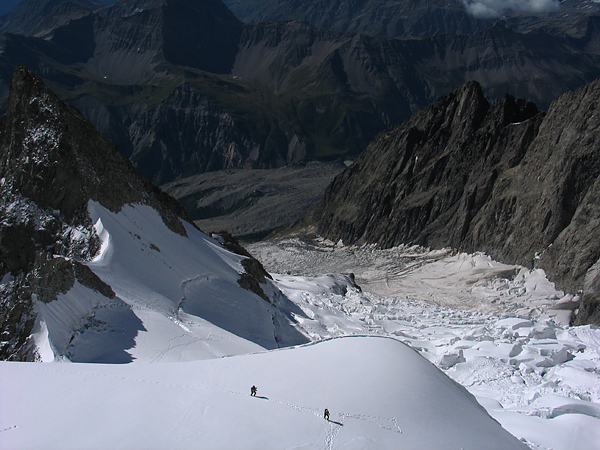
Climbers on Brouillard Glacier, Italy

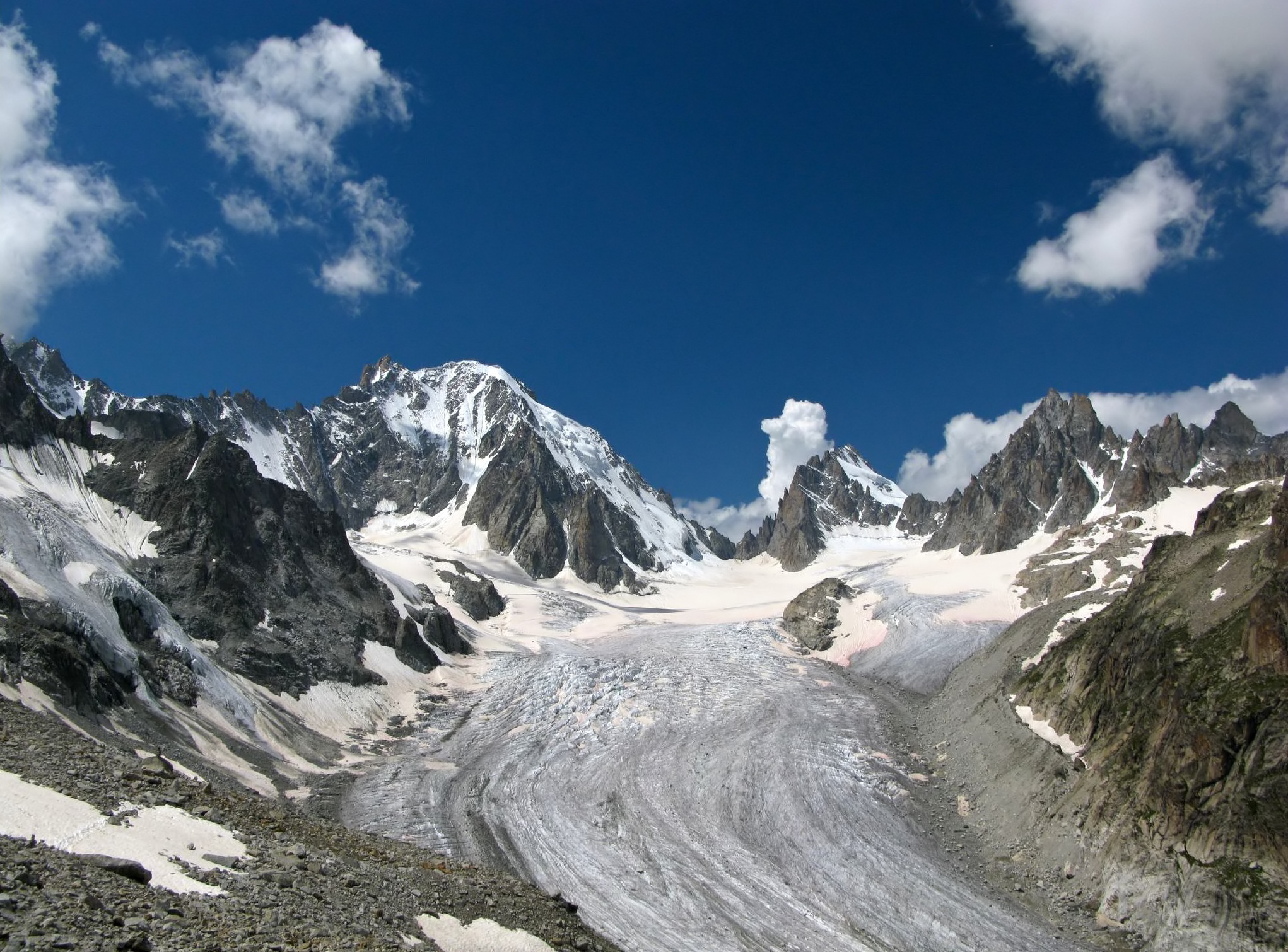
Saleina glacier and the Aiguille d'Argentière on the Swiss side

Aerial view of Glacier du Brouillard (left) and Glacier de Frêney (center)

A wide range of glaciers and glacial structures can be found across the Mont Blanc massif, all of which can be easily reached or viewed. Glaciers cover 170 square kilometres (66 mi^{2}) of the massif, of which 110 km^{2} (42 mi^{2}) fall within France. The Mer de Glace is the largest glacier in the western Alps, and the second largest in Europe. It has a total length of 12 km (7.5 mi) from highest snowfield to terminus and an area of 35–40 km^{2} (14–15 sq mi).

At around 10 km (6 mi) in length, the Miage Glacier is Italy's longest glacier and also the largest debris-covered glacier in Europe. Other large glaciers include the Argentière Glacier (9 km (5.6 mi)), the Saleina Glacier (6 km (3.7 mi)), Trient Glacier (4 km (2.5 mi)), the Bossons Glacier (c. 4 km (2.5 mi)) and the Brenva Glacier. Whilst these glaciers appear to show similar fluctuations in length, research shows that each glacier of the Mont Blanc massif has its own individual and distinctive response time to changes in snowfall and climate. The Bossons Glacier is known to respond first, then the Argentière and the Trient Glaciers respond four to seven years later, with the Mer de Glace reacting last —between eleven and fifteen years after changes are first observed in the movement of ice in the Bossons Glacier.

Even the smallest glaciers can have a significant impact on the environment and on human activity. In 1892, a large body of water which had accumulated under the surface of the Tête Rousse Glacier, burst suddenly on the night of 11 July. It released 200,000 cubic metres (7,100,000 ft^{3}) of water and ice which flowed down the mountainside, killing 175 people in Saint-Gervais. The recent rediscovery of a further build-up of water deep within the glacier is now a cause of serious concern.

The inexorable downward movement and melting of glaciers can result in objects lost within them reappearing many years later. The first recorded account of a body reappearing from a glacier in the Mont Blanc range was made by Viscount Edmond de Catelin in 1861. It concerned three alpine guides who were buried in a crevasse during an avalanche on 20 August 1820 near the Rocher Rouges, high up on Mont Blanc, during an expedition organised by Joseph Hamel. Forty years later the remains of two of them were discovered, re-exposed within fissures in the Bossons glacier. They were 3,000 metres (9,800 ft) lower down from the point where they were lost; the corpse of the third guide was discovered the following year. In 2014, a group of climbers found a body on the Glacier du Talèfre, close to the Couvercle Hut. It was identified as that of a young Chamonix guide who had been caught in a winter storm during a solo ascent of the Nant Blanc face of the Aiguille Verte in 1982 and was assumed to have fallen into a crevasse. In 2013, a box of valuable gemstones was found by a climber on the Bossons Glacier. It had re-emerged, having been carried 3,048 metres (10,000 ft) downhill from the site of one of two Air India plane crashes. These occurred at almost identical locations high up near the summit of Mont Blanc: one in 1950 (Air India Flight 245), and one in 1966 (Air India Flight 101). Debris from these crashes is still commonly found on the glacier below.

Glaciers of the Mont Blanc massif, listed by country and from north to south. Those over 3 km (1.9 mi) in length are indicated in bold type. (Note: Glaciers and accompanying observations derived from French IGN online mapping portal)
Glacier Name	Country	Observations
**Glacier du Tour**	France	
**Glacier d'Argentière**	France	Fed by Glacier du Chardonnet, Glacier du Milieu, Glacier des Améthistes, Glacier du Tour Noir, Glacier des Rognons
Glacier des Grands Montets	France	descends from the Aiguille des Grands Montets, along with Glacier de la Pendent and Glacier de Lognan
Glacier du Nant Blanc	France	
Glacier des Drus	France	
Glacier de la Charpoua	France	
**Mer de Glace**	France	longest glacier in the massif
Glacier des Courtes	France	
**Glacier de Talèfre**	France	
**Glacier de Leschaux**	France	fed by Glacier du Mont Mallet and Glacier de Pierre Joseph, then merges with Glacier du Tacul to form Mer de Glace.
Glacier du Capucin	France	
Glacier du Tacul	France	from Plateau du Géant; merges with Glacier de Leschaux
Glacier des Périades	France	feeds into Glacier du Tacul
Glacier la Noire	France	feeds into Glacier des Périades
Glacier de la Thendia	France	
Glacier de Trelaporte	France	
Glacier des Nantillons	France	
Glacier de Blaitière	France	
Glacier de Envers de Blaitière	France	
Glacier de Envers du Plan	France	
Glacier des Pélerins	France	between Aiguille du Midi and Aiguille du Plan
Glacier Rond	France	
**Bossons Glacier**	France	descends from summit of Mont Blanc
**Géant Glacier**	France	feeds into la Vallee Blanche and then Glacier du Tacul
**Glacier de Taconnaz**	France	
Glacier du Bourgeat	France	
Glacier de la Griaz	France	
Glacier de Tête Rousse	France	
**Glacier de Bionnassay**	France	
Glacier de Tricot	France	
Glacier de Miage	France	not to be confused with Glacier du Miage on the Italian side
Glacier de Covagnet	France	
**Glacier de Tré la Tête**	France	
Glacier du Mont Tondu	France	
Glacier des Lanchettes	France	
Glacier d'Enclave	France	
Glacier des Glaciers	France	
**Glacier de Pré de Bar**	Italy	Italian: **Ghiacciaio di Pré de Bar**
Glacier de Triolet	Italy	Italian: Ghiacciaio del Triolet
Glacier de Gruetta	Italy	Italian: Ghiacciaio di Gruevetta
Glacier de Frébouze	Italy	Italian: Ghiacciaio di Frèbouze
Glacier de Tronchey	Italy	
Glacier de Pra Sec	Italy	
Glacier des Grandes Jorasses	Italy	
Glacier de Planpincieux	Italy	
Glacier de Mt Frety	Italy	Italian: Ghiacciaio di Crety
Glacier de Toule	Italy	Italian: Ghiacciaio di Toula
Glacier de Entreves	Italy	
**Brenva Glacier**	Italy	
**Glacier de Frêney**	Italy	Italian: **Ghiacciaio del Freney**
Glacier du Chatelet	Italy	
Glacier du Brouillard	Italy	
Glacier du Mont Blanc	Italy	Feeds into the Miage Glacier
**Glacier du Dôme**	Italy	Feeds into the Miage Glacier
Glacier de Bionnassay Italien	Italy	Feeds into the Miage Glacier
**Miage Glacier**	Italy	The largest glacier within Italy. (Not to be confused with Glacier de Miage on the French side)
Glacier de Petit Mont Blanc	Italy	
**Glacier de la Lée Blanche**	Italy	
Glacier d'Estelette	Italy	Italian: Ghiacciaio d'Estelette
Glacier des Grands	Switzerland	
**Glacier du Trient**	Switzerland	
**Glacier d'Orny**	Switzerland	
Glacier des Ravines Rousses	Switzerland	
Glacier des Plines	Switzerland	
**Glacier de Saleina**	Switzerland	
Glacier des Planereuses	Switzerland	
Glacier du Darrey	Switzerland	
Glacier de Treutse Bô	Switzerland	
Glacier de l'A Neuve	Switzerland	
Glacier du Dolent	Switzerland	

== Geology ==
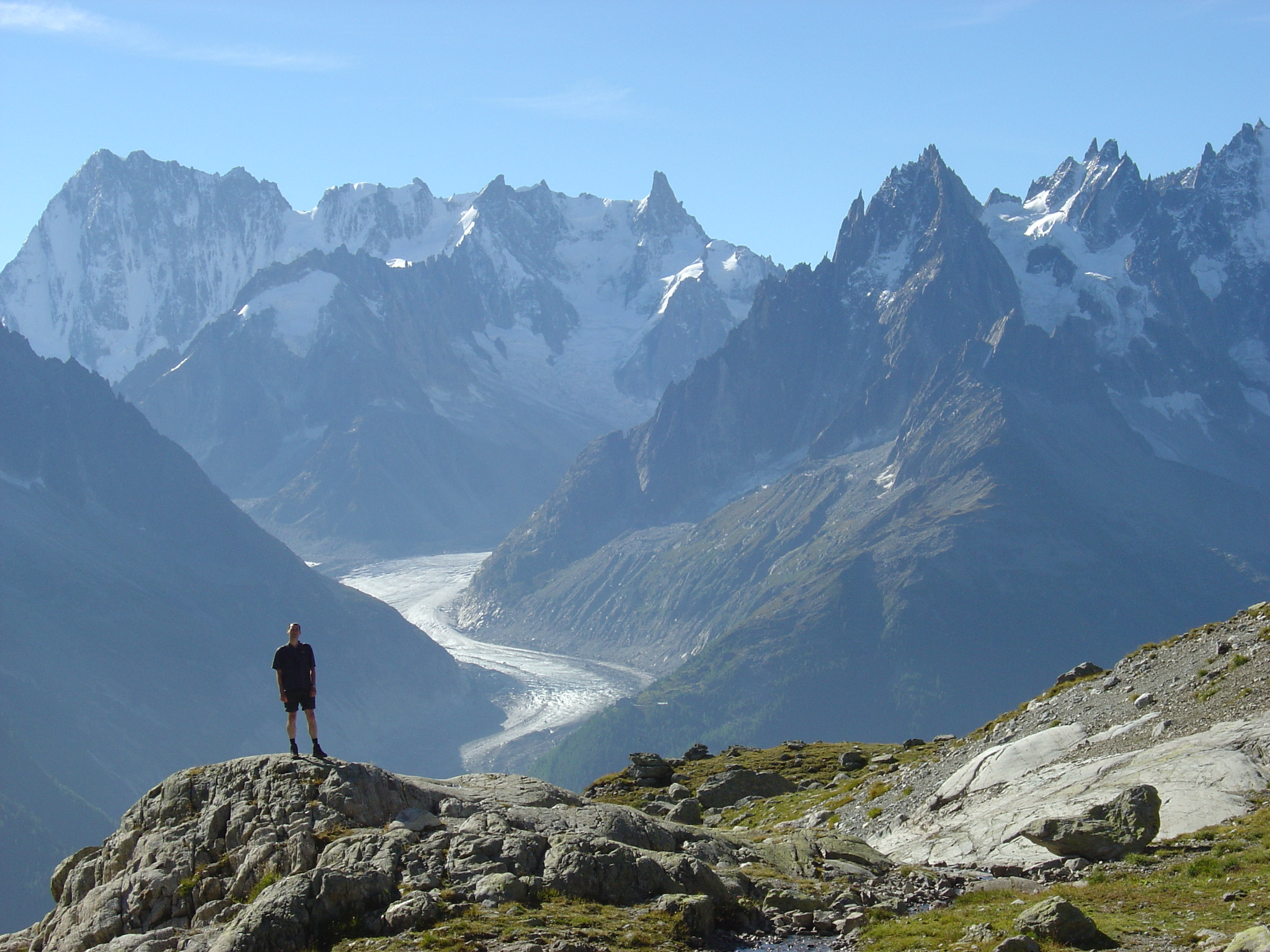
The Grandes Jorasses, Dent du Géant and the Mer de Glace

The Mont Blanc massif consists predominantly of ancient granite rocks. The Alps have their origins 770 million years ago when upheaval of the earth's crust lifted up schist, gneiss and limestone rocks. These were destined to form the base of the Alps range, and this period of upheaval ended 300 million years ago. Granite intrusions and associated metamorphic rocks formed the base of the mountains we now call the Mont Blanc massif as well as the nearby Aiguilles Rouges. But these rocks were then heavily eroded away, eventually being ground down and inundated by the sea, so allowing sedimentary rocks to form. Then, once again, this part of the Earth's crust was uplifted as a result of the collision of continental plates. The huge mountain ranges of today's Alps began to form. This happened towards the end of the Tertiary period, 15 million years ago. Finally, came the Quaternary era, when successive ice ages saw vast glaciers advance, retreat, and then advance again. Their movement across the landscape ground down and shaped the mountains and the valleys as seen today.

Both the Mont Blanc massif, and the Aiguilles Rouges range to its north, now form part of the external zone of the Alps, effectively being the outermost layers of rock. The central granites make up Mont Blanc, the steep slopes of the Drus, the Grandes Jorasses and the Dent du Géant, and at the highest points are topped by schists, which are visible in places such as Grands Montets and near Mont Blanc's summit.

The granite mountains around Chamonix have been eroded into steep needle-shaped peaks (known as aiguilles). Known locally as protogine, these rocks are lower in the mineral biotite mica and richer in quartz than the granites commonly found elsewhere.

A large part of the massif is covered by ice fields and is cut by numerous glaciers, mostly flowing northwestwards on the French side; southeastwards on the Italian side and eastwards on the Swiss side. With much steeper slopes on the Italian side, many glaciers drop very sharply and some, such as the Miage Glacier and the Brenva Glacier, are very heavily covered in rock debris. The massif is itself defined by broad valleys which formed along fault lines and which have subsequently been shaped by ice during the last glacial period of the ice age.

During the mid-19th century the granite of the Mont Blanc massif was an important source of stone for buildings; one hundred Italian stonemasons were brought to the Chamonix valley by Charles Albert of Sardinia for reconstructing the towns of Sallanches and Cluses, both of which had at that time just been destroyed by fires.

=== Minerals ===
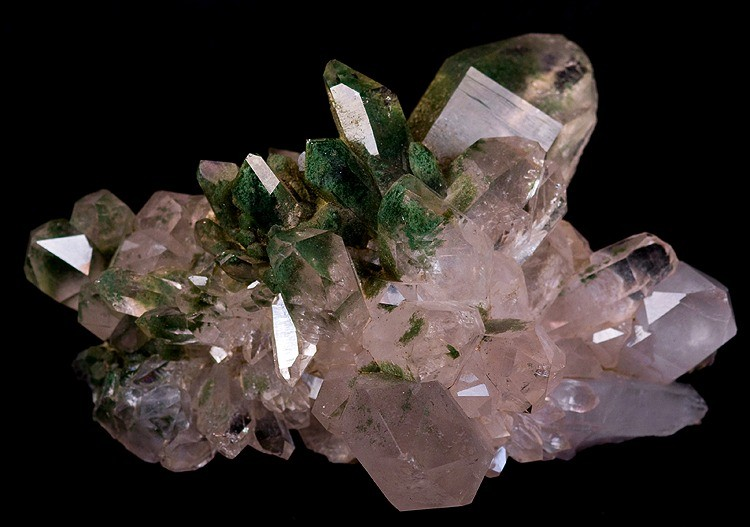
Quartz crystals with chlorite, Lex Blanche glacier, Val Veny, Italy

The massif has been an important source of mineral specimens for crystal-hunters for over 250 years. The mountaineer and explorer, Edward Whymper, noted that the basin of the Glacier de Talèfre was "considered good hunting-ground for crystals", and that the slopes below les Courtes had yielded many large specimens. He recounted that in 1745 a guide had stated he had collected over 300 pounds (136 kg) of specimens there in just three hours. The first systematic account of the minerals of the Mont Blanc area was published in 1873 by Venance Payot. His list, entitled "Statistique minéralogique des environs du Mt-Blanc", catalogued 90 mineral types although it also included those present only as very small components of rocks. If these are excluded, it is known today that at least 68 separate mineral species occur across the whole range of the Mont Blanc massif.

In order to preserve the mineralogical heritage of Mont Blanc, in 2008 the commune of Chamonix banned all mineral-hunting activities and collection of specimens without a prior permit being issued by the mayor's office. Use of explosives, heavy machinery or helicopters for removing material were also banned, and a code of practice put in place which requires an annual declaration of all finds to be made. It also gives a right for the Chamonix crystal museum (Musée des Cristaux) to have first option to acquire specimens of significance for its collections. To further protect the scientific value of material collected, all specimens offered for sale must be labelled with details of where they were found. The crystal museum opened to the public in 2006 and tells the story of the early crystal-hunters (known as cristalliers). Many specimens collected from across the massif are displayed there.

== Climate ==
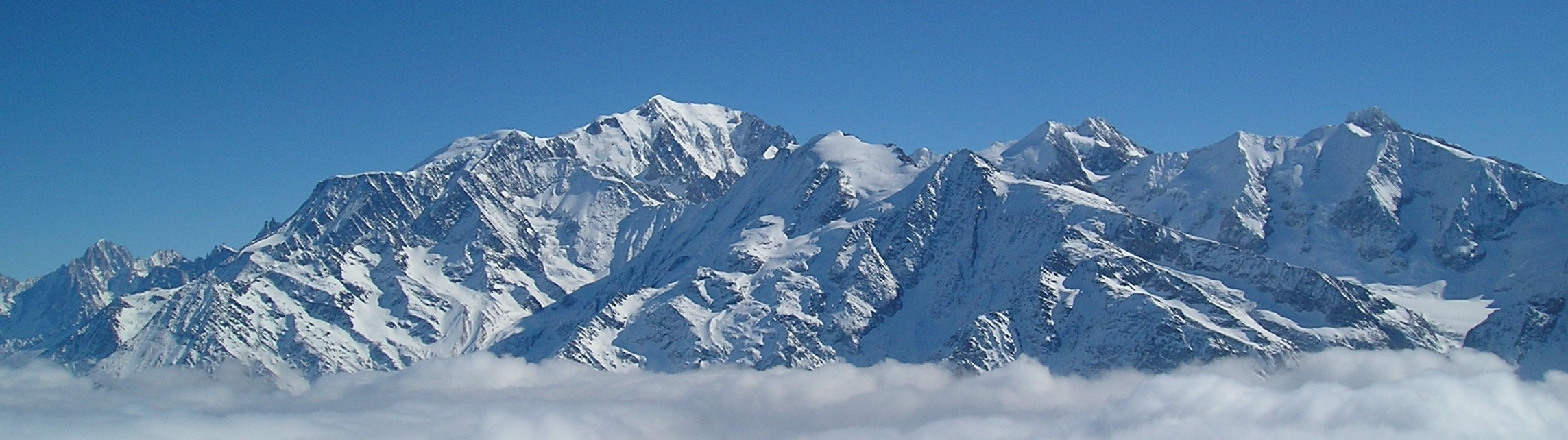
Mont Blanc massif in winter, seen from above Les Contamines-Montjoie

Located on the watershed between the Rhône and the Po, the Mont Blanc massif is also situated between the two different climatic regions of the northern and western Alps and that of the southern Alps. Climatic conditions on the Mer de Glace are similar to those found on the northern side of the Swiss Alps.

The climate of the Mont Blanc massif is cold and temperate (Köppen climate classification Cfb), and is greatly influenced by altitude. The main valley settlements around the perimeter of the massif are at an altitude ranging between 600 and 1,200 metres (2,000 and 3,900 ft). Daytime valley temperatures in July and August may range up to 25 °C (77 °F), sometimes reaching 30 °C (86 °F). The greatest snowfall occurs between the months of November and April.

The best weather for mountaineering or hiking occurs between late June to early October but, being the highest part of the Alps, the Mont Blanc massif can create its own weather patterns. Temperatures drop as the mountains gain in height, and the summit of Mont Blanc is a permanent ice cap, with temperatures around −20 °C (−4 °F). The summit is also prone to strong winds and sudden weather changes. Because of the massif's great overall height, a considerable proportion is permanently glaciated or snow-covered and is exposed to extremely cold conditions. Even on the high passes of the Tour du Mont Blanc, around 2,000 to 2,500 m (6,600 to 8,200 ft), summer temperatures can be between 5 and 15 °C (41 and 59 °F), but feeling much colder because of wind chill in windy or wet conditions.

Weather for two main valley towns
feature:	Chamonix	Courmayeur
Elevation	1,030 m (3,380 ft)	1,260 m (4,130 ft)
Average rainfall	1,055 mm (41.5 in)	1,139 mm (44.8 in)
Coldest month	January	January
Driest month	April	April
Warmest month	July	July
Mean annual temperature	7.3 °C (45.1 °F)	6.3 °C (43.3 °F)
Average January temperature	between −2.1 and −2.8 °C (28.2 and 27.0 °F)	
Average July temperature	between 15.3 and 16.2 °C (59.5 and 61.2 °F)	

Precipitation is distributed fairly evenly over all months of the year, and mostly originates from a westerly airflow. There is, however, significant variation in precipitation with altitude. For example, Chamonix has an elevation of approximately 1,030 metres (3,380 ft) and receives around 1,020 mm (40 in) of annual precipitation, whilst the Col du Midi, which is at 3,500 metres (11,500 ft) above sea level, receives significantly more, totalling 3,100 mm (122 in). However, at an even higher altitude (near to the summit of Mont Blanc) precipitation is considerably less, with only around 1,100 mm (43 in) recorded, despite the latter measurements being taken at a height of 4,300 metres (14,100 ft).

In the mountains further south of the Mont Blanc range, annual precipitation is significantly less than at equivalent altitudes within the massif. For example, the valleys in the Pelvoux massif at around 1,000 metres (3,300 ft) receive only around 600 to 700 mm (24 to 28 in) of precipitation per year, which is significantly less than that in either Courmayeur or Chamonix.

Climate data for Chamonix (1,054 metres (3,458 ft)) for historic period 1934–1962
Month	Jan	Feb	Mar	Apr	May	Jun	Jul	Aug	Sep	Oct	Nov	Dec	Year
Daily mean °C (°F)	−4.3 (24.3)	−2.2 (28.0)	2.4 (36.3)	6.9 (44.4)	10.1 (50.2)	13.6 (56.5)	15.6 (60.1)	14.8 (58.6)	12.2 (54.0)	7.7 (45.9)	1.4 (34.5)	−3.0 (26.6)	6.6 (43.9)
Average precipitation mm (inches)	116 (4.6)	109 (4.3)	74 (2.9)	76 (3.0)	91 (3.6)	130 (5.1)	119 (4.7)	134 (5.3)	105 (4.1)	82 (3.2)	114 (4.5)	112 (4.4)	1,262 (49.7)
Average snowfall mm (inches)	68.5 (2.70)	60.7 (2.39)	29.0 (1.14)	15.2 (0.60)	3.5 (0.14)	0 (0)	0 (0)	0 (0)	0 (0)	6.1 (0.24)	30.7 (1.21)	67.2 (2.65)	280.9 (11.07)
Source: Chamonix meteorological office

== Ecology ==
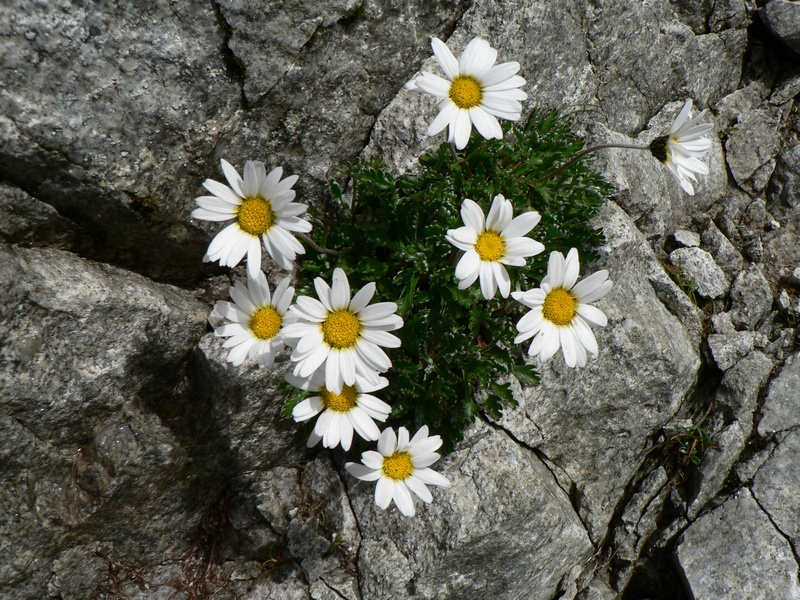
Alpine chrysanthemum (Leucanthemopsis alpina)

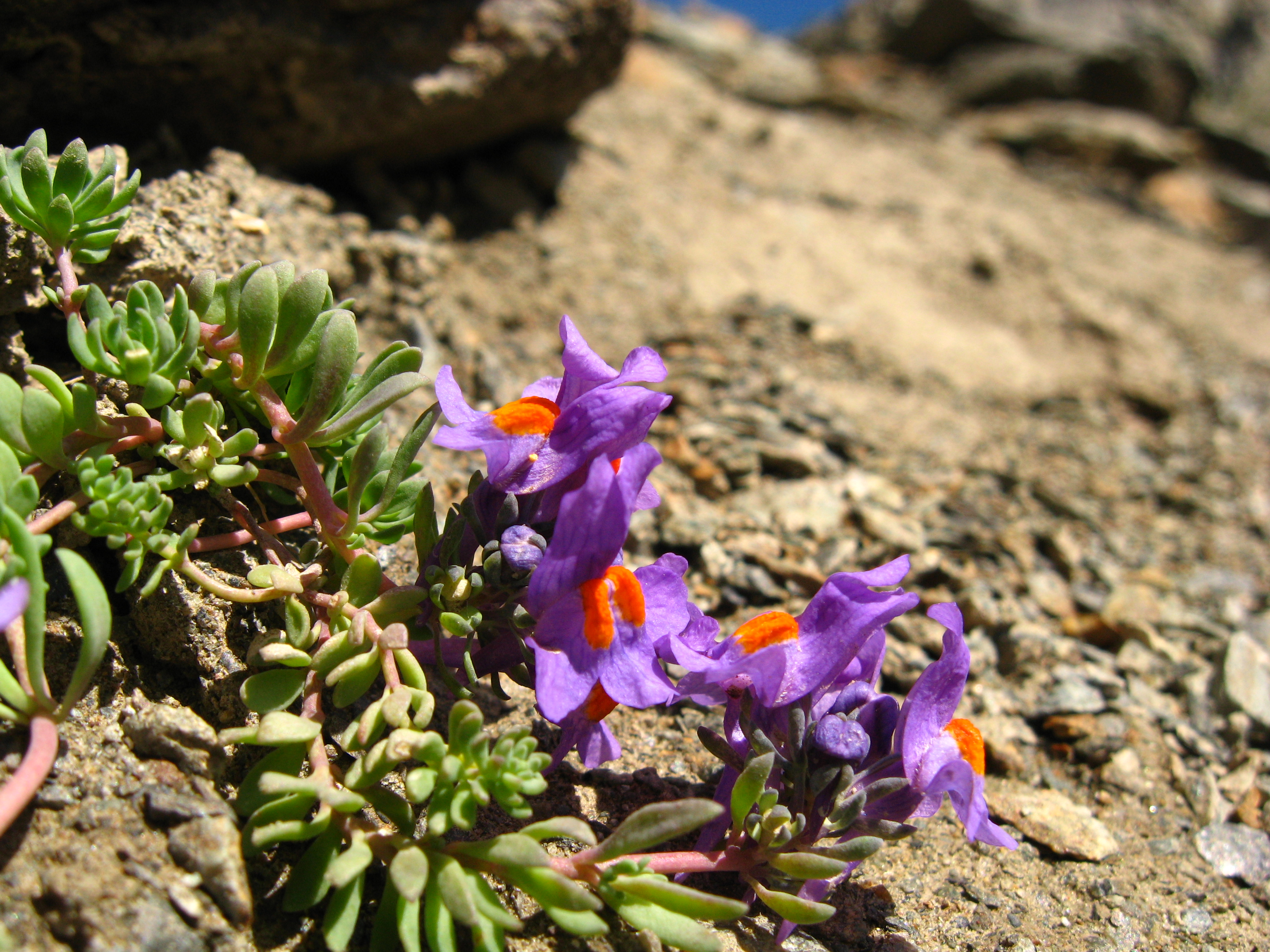
Alpine toadflax (Linaria alpina), Mont Blanc massif, Italy

The massif contains a very rich variety of biodiversity as a result of the huge height range and different habitats found between the valleys and the highest summits. Mild temperatures occur at altitudes between 600 and 1,000 metres (2,000 and 3,300 ft), whereas arctic conditions occur from 2,500 metres (8,200 ft) up to the highest point at 4,808 metres (15,774 ft).

Whilst the Mont Blanc massif does not contain any species that are endemic to it, there are many rare and legally protected species found within its four major habitat zones. These are the: montane forests, sub-alpine, alpine and nival zones. The major habitats are coniferous forests, moors, rock and talus slopes, plus glacial moraines. The biological richness is further influenced by the different aspects of the faces, by the geology, and by the influence of man on the lower and middle slopes where forest clearance has created open grassland. The native forest habitats are essential for the survival of many species, with the key conifer species including larch, pine, stone pine and red pine.

=== Flora ===
Over a thousand plant species have been recorded across the massif, from the valley bottoms right up to 3,800 m (12,500 ft) where the alpine chrysanthemum (Leucanthemopsis alpina) can be found at a record-breaking height.

Early explorers, such as Alexander von Humboldt in 1807, observed a number of notable species in the mountains around Mont Blanc at altitudes above 3,100 metres (10,200 feet). This was well above the permanent snow line, but on rocks that were so steep that little snow could rest. These arctic-alpine species included: Androsace carnea; Androsace chamaejasme; Arabis caerulea; Cardamine bellidifolia; Draba hirta; Saxifraga androsacea and Silene acaulis (occurring down to 1,500 m (4,900 ft)). Between 2,500 and 3,100 m (8,200 and 10,200 ft), Humboldt noted the following species of flowering plants amongst rocky debris around permanent snow fields and the highest alpine glaciers: Achillea nana; Achillea atrata; Gentiana nivalis; Juncus trifidus; Ranunculus glacialis; Saxifraga biflora and Saxifraga oppositifolia.

In the mid-1800s, Venance Payot, a Chamonix naturalist, published a number of articles on the flora around the Mont Blanc area, including a list of the flowering plants, ferns mosses and lichens found at les Grands Mulets and elsewhere in the massif around Chamonix and the Aosta Valley.

High up in the middle of the Glacier de Talèfre, completely surrounded by ice, and due south of Les Droites, lies a large triangular region of steep mountainside containing an unusual mixture of high-alpine vegetation. Known as the Jardin de Talèfre, its name derives from the rich assemblage of plants which occur at great altitude there (between 2,650 and 3,000 m (8,690 and 9,840 ft)). Described as "one of the loftiest patches of vegetation in Europe upon an islet of rock in the midst of a wilderness of snow and ice", it is higher than the adjacent ground by tens of metres and, as a result, was spared glacial scouring and subsequent loss of its vegetation during the Little Ice Age (between 1300 and 1850). Nevertheless, it would at that time still have been surrounded by ice on all three sides, as evidenced by the three glacial moraines found there today. Species recorded there include: Achillea nana; Alchemilla pentaphylla; Arenaria biflora; Arenaria serpyllifolia; Cardamine alpina; Draba frigida; Empetrum nigrum; Epilobium alpinum; Helictotrichon versicolor; Homogyne alpina; Jacobaea incana; Juncus trifidus; Kalmia procumbens; Poa laxa; Potentilla frigida; Ranunculus glacialis; Ranunculus pyrenaeus; Saxifraga aspera; Saxifraga bryoides; Saxifraga oppositifolia; Sedum alpestre; Sibbaldia procumbens and Trifolium alpinum.

The Saussurea Alpine Botanical Garden above Courmayeur is located at 2,173 m (7,129 ft) above sea level, and is the highest botanical garden in Europe. It contains around 800 plant species and covers an area of 7,000 square metres (75,000 sq ft). It was originally created in 1987 just as a tourist attraction but, with the subsequent designation of the adjacent Pavillon du Mont Frety as a protected area, it has since increased in scientific importance. It can be reached either from the mid-way station of the Skyway Monte Bianco, or on foot from La Palud within two hours and an ascent of 800 m (2,600 ft). The botanical garden derives its name from the genus of mountain flowers, Saussurea (Saw-worts) which itself was named after Horace-Bénédict de Saussure, whose enthusiasm for scientific research in the mountains led to the first ascent of Mont Blanc in 1786.

=== Fauna ===
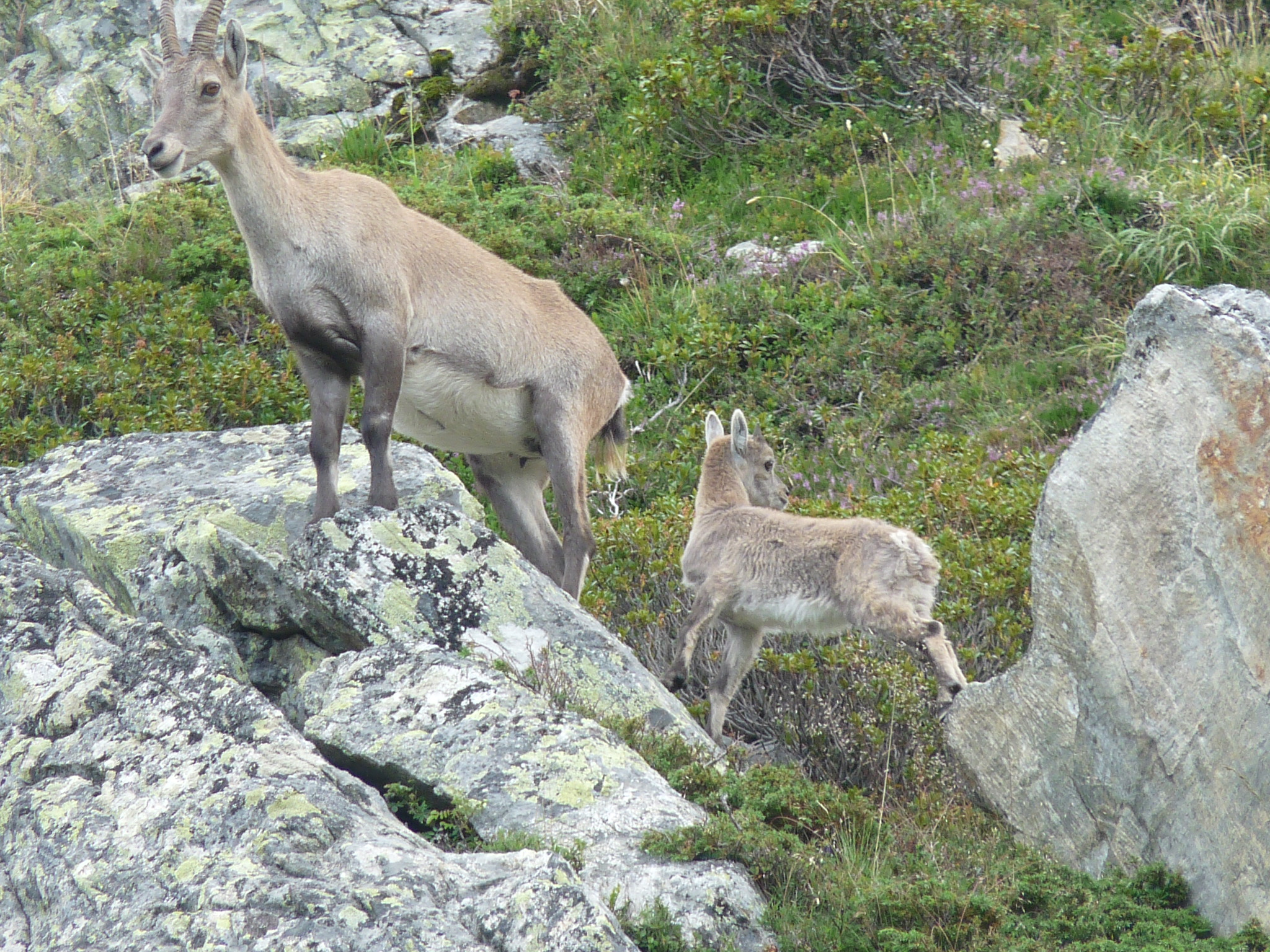
Female alpine ibex with kid, near Tré la Tête glacier

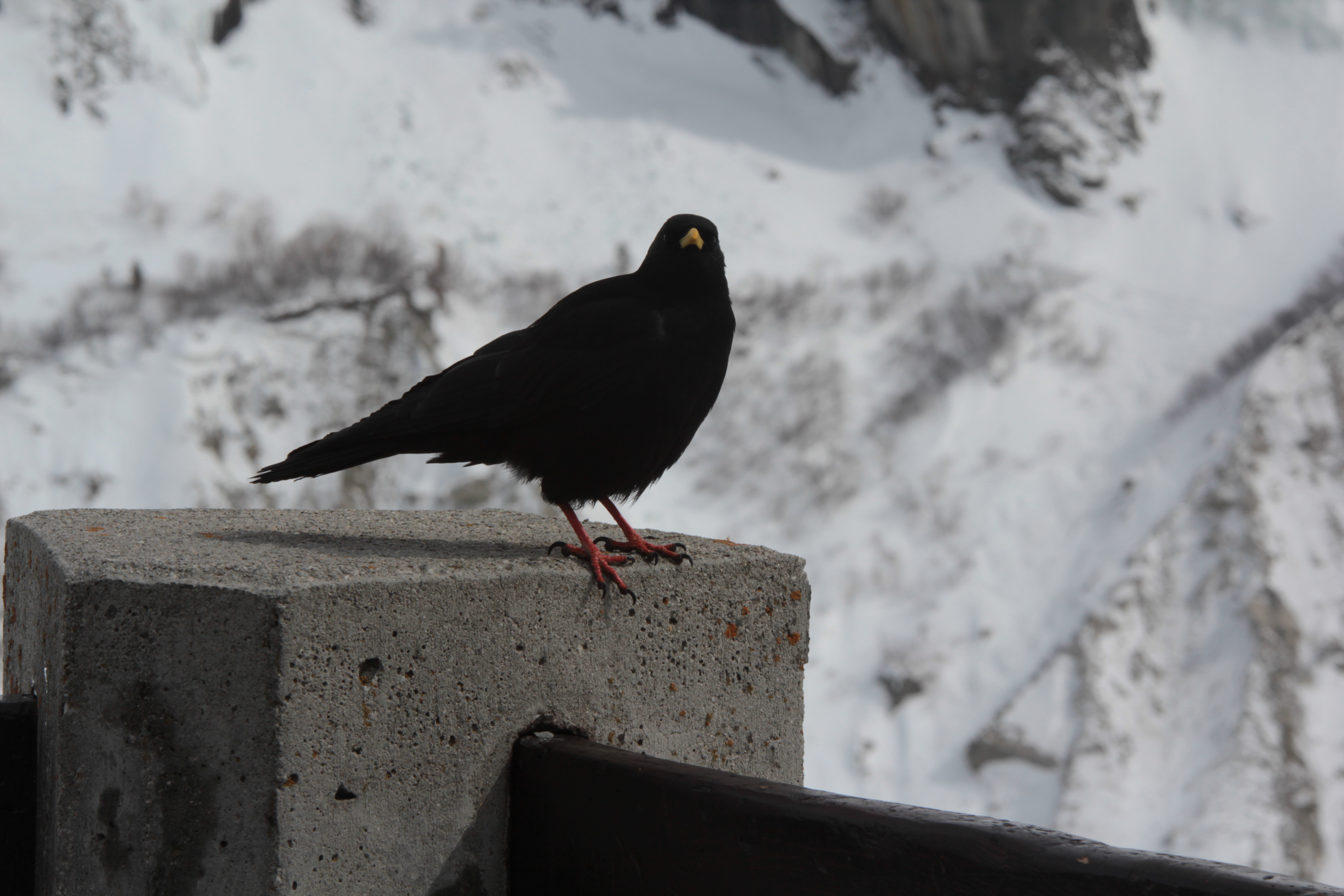
Alpine chough, (Pyrrhocorax graculus), Mer de Glace.

The mountains around Mont Blanc are home to many mammal species, including ibex, chamois, deer, mountain hare and alpine marmot (including a small population of albino marmots within Val Ferret). Eurasian lynx have been reintroduced into the French Alps and, although present around the Mont Blanc massif, are extremely unlikely to be encountered.

Over 80 different bird species have been recorded on the Italian side of the massif from within Val Ferret, including 63 nesting species and nine regional or national rarities. The following birds have been recorded in different habitats right across the Mont Blanc massif:

- Valleys and lower pastures: Blackbird; carrion crow; chaffinch; goldfinch; great tit; house martin; house sparrow; nuthatch; robin; swallow; song thrush; whinchat; yellowhammer.
- Rivers: Dipper; wagtails.
- Forests: Coal tit; crested tit; jay; marsh tit; mistle thrush; nutcracker; willow tit.
- Above tree line: Alpine accentor; alpine chough; bearded vulture (rare); black redstart; citril finch; meadow pipit; ptarmigan; common redstart; snowfinch; wallcreeper; wheatear.
- Raptors: Buzzard; golden eagle; honey buzzard; kestrel; peregrine falcon; sparrowhawk.

Seven of the massif's largest indigenous mammal species are housed in the Merlet Animal Park near Les Houches, including ibex, chamois, marmot, fallow and roe deer. Located 600 metres (2,000 ft) above the village, the park was founded in 1968 and contains eighty animal species from mountain habitats around the world.

== Human history ==
=== Early history ===
The region in which the Mont Blanc massif is located has been occupied by humans for at least 70,000 years, although, as now—and because of the great height and glaciated nature of the mountains—only the lower parts of the valleys around its perimeter would have been inhabited or used as routes of communication.

The Romans, who occupied the region 2,000 years ago, used the main valleys around the massif for military purposes. They gave the name Alpes Penninae, or Poeninae, to the highest parts of the Alps—which extended from Mont Blanc to Monte Rosa. They took over Aosta from the Salassi Celtic tribe in 25 AD and engineered roads which extended northwards into Europe via the Great St Bernard Pass and the Little St Bernard Pass. Courmayeur, on the southern side of the massif, began to develop as a stop-off along their trans-alpine trading routes between Italy and France. Parts of the modern Tour du Mont Blanc walking trail still follow the route of a Roman road along the Col du Bonhomme and the Col de la Seigne.

The Romans occupied Martigny to the north of the massif, and their influence spread out well beyond the Alps into much of northern Europe. As a result of aggressive pressure from tribes in the north, the imperial forces of Rome were gradually withdrawn from the alpine regions until, by the 5th century AD, they had left completely. The areas left behind were occupied in the western part by the Burgundian tribes from what is today France, whilst the Alemanni tribes from Germany moved into eastern parts, resulting in the linguistic divide found today across the Alps.

For many centuries thereafter, the settlements around the Mont Blanc massif comprised a rural population of peasant mountain farmers, living off animal husbandry, supplemented with a meagre harvest of rye and oats. Some farmers in the valley of Chamonix joined their counterparts from the neighbouring valleys of Maurienne, Beaufortain and Tarentaise and crossed the Alps into southern Germany, Austria and northern Italy to sell their products and bring back goods for sale in local markets.

=== Tourist beginnings ===
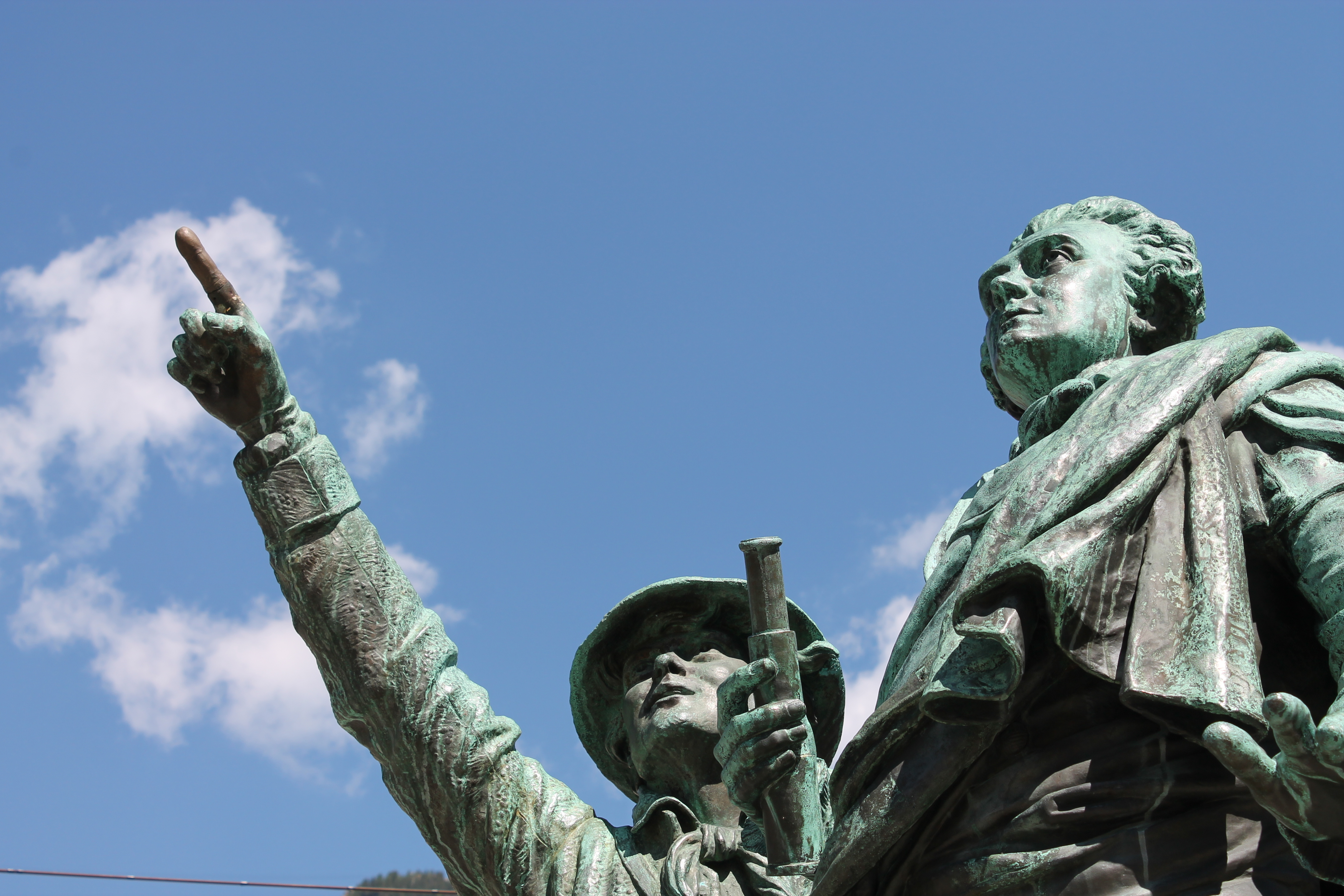
Statue of Jacques Balmat and Horace-Bénédict de Saussure in a monument erected at Chamonix in 1887.

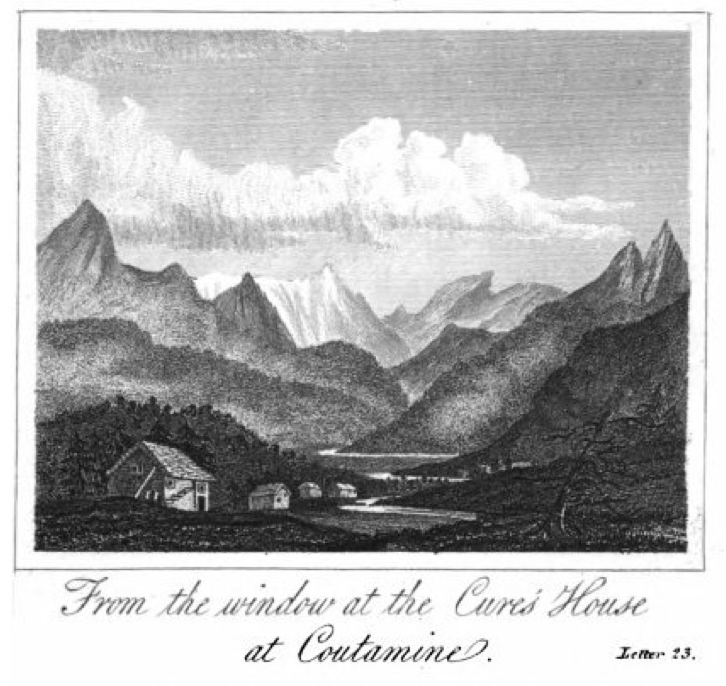
View from Contamines-Montjoie. From A Tour to Great St Bernards and round Mont Blanc, W.Rose. 1827 (written for young people aged 10 to 14)

In 1741, the Chamouny valley and its glaciers on the north side of the massif were discovered and written about by two aristocratic travelling Englishmen, named William Windham and Richard Pococke. The descriptions of their exploits were published across Europe, bringing the mountains of the Mont Blanc range to the attention of a wide audience for the first time. In 1760, Horace-Bénédict de Saussure offered a large financial prize to the first people who successfully ascended Mont Blanc. The summit was finally attained on 8 August 1786 by two Chamonix men, the guide Jacques Balmat and Dr. Michel Paccard. The decades that followed saw the gradual opening up of Chamonix to the world, as well as the rest of the Mont Blanc massif. The many published accounts of climbs and impressive sights amongst or around the mountain range attracted numerous wealthy and notable visitors, for whom a visit to marvel at the Sea of Ice (the Mer de Glace) became a fashionable thing to experience.

In July 1816, Mary Shelley and Percy Bysshe Shelley toured the Alps and visited Chamouni (as it was then known), as well as the Mer de Glace and the Bossons Glacier. They jointly published their accounts and letters in a work entitled: History of a Six Weeks' Tour through a part of France, Switzerland, Germany, and Holland; with Letters Descriptive of a Sail Round the Lake of Geneva and of the Glaciers of Chamouni. The book concludes with Mont Blanc, a 144-line poem by Percy Shelley, written whilst in Chamonix and which was inspired by the river Arve, the snow-covered summits, the chaotic glaciers and the forests that he experienced during their visit.

Far, far above, piercing the infinite sky,
Mont Blanc appears—still, snowy, and serene—
Its subject mountains their unearthly forms
Pile around it, ice and rock; broad vales between
Of frozen floods, unfathomable deeps,
Blue as the overhanging heaven, that spread
And wind among the accumulated steeps;

— Percy Bysshe Shelley, Mont Blanc: Lines Written in the Vale of Chamouni

Amongst many other notable visitors were: Goethe (1779); Chateaubriand (1805); Madame de Staël; Victor Hugo; Louis Pasteur and Franz Liszt (1836), plus two successive wives of Napoleon Bonaparte: Joséphine de Beauharnais (1810) and Marie Louise of Austria (1814). In 1849, John Ruskin spent a month in Chamonix, from where he painted some of the massif's mountains before undertaking the Tour of Mont Blanc. When Savoy was eventually annexed to France in 1860, Napoleon III and Empress Eugénie visited the region to mark the event and undertook to enhance road access leading to the end of the Arve valley.

The 19th century saw considerable economic development which turned the small agricultural town of Chamonix into a base for tourists, with luxurious hotels and mountain lodges being built to accommodate them. A trade in selling local items to visiting foreigners soon developed. Crystals collected from across the massif were much in demand, as were locally produced goods such as horn trinkets and honey.

In just 50 years the Mont Blanc massif, and Chamonix and Courmayeur in particular, had become a popular destination for many travellers, and its economy changed from 80% agriculture to 80% tourism. It saw the emergence and spread of the sport of alpine mountaineering, and visitor numbers increased significantly. By the end of the 18th century, Chamonix was home to around 1,500 summer visitors. By 1850 it was welcoming 5,000 visitors, and by 1892 those numbers had risen to 24,000 a year. In 1906, the eleventh edition of a guidebook written by Edward Whymper about Chamonix and the Mont Blanc range estimated that 130,000 visitors had gone there during the previous season. It also reported that the railway service to Chamonix, which had previously been suspended in winter, was now running throughout the year. The tourist boom to the mountains had started. In 1924, a Winter Sports Week was held in Chamonix, with patronage from the International Olympic Committee. It attracted over 10,000 paying visitors and was retrospectively named as the first Winter Olympic Games.

=== Modern tourism ===
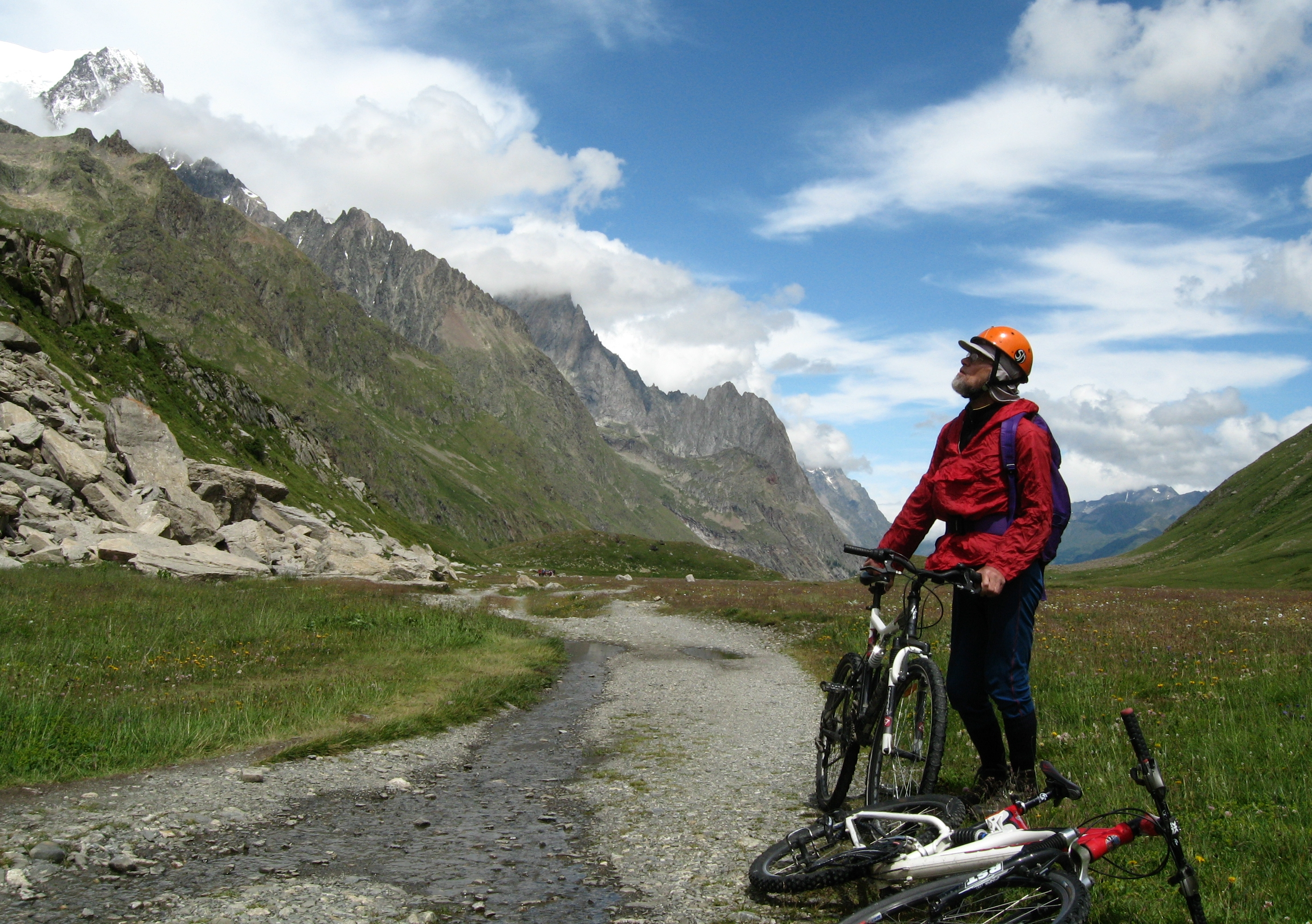
Val Veny, near Col de la Seigne, Italy. Route of the Tour du Mont Blanc, parts of which are accessible by mountain bike.

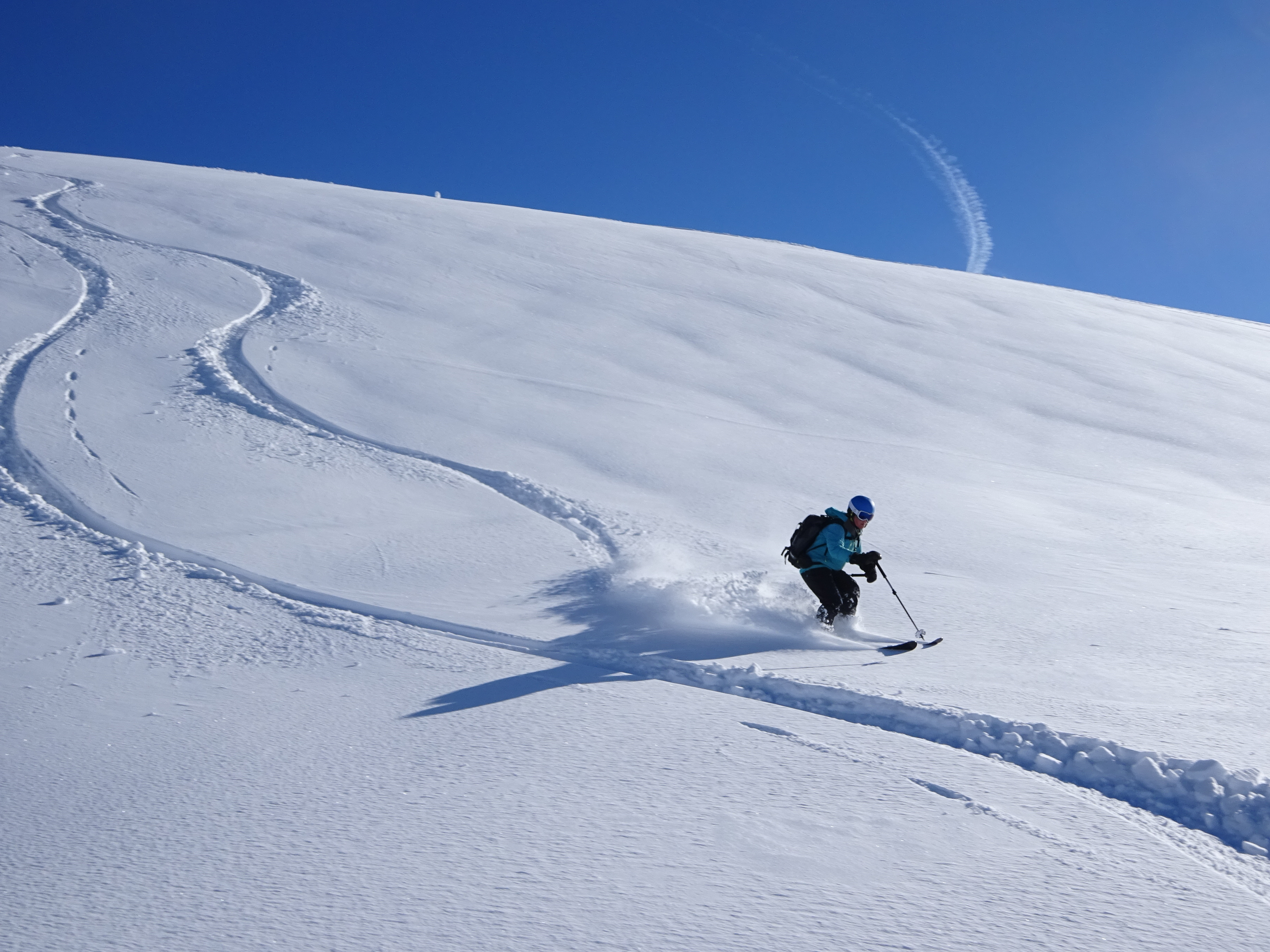
Powder skiing in Chamonix Mont Blanc

The Mont Blanc massif is now a significant tourist destination. The region attracts over six million people per annum, with around one in five gaining access to its slopes by means of mechanical infrastructure (cable cars or funicular railways). Some surveys have shown that tourists mostly come to the Mont Blanc massif and its environs for winter sports such as skiing as well as summer outdoor activities like hiking, climbing and cycling.

The Aiguille du Midi Cable Car in Chamonix attracts 500,000 people each year and gives views over much of the massif, and up towards Mont Blanc itself. From Chamonix it rises to the summit of the Aiguille du Midi at 3,842 metres (12,605 ft), and holds the world record for the highest vertical ascent of any cable car (2,807 m (9,209 ft)).

The building of the new Skyway Monte Bianco cable car on the Italian side of the massif is expected to increase visitor numbers to Courmayeur from 100,000 to 300,000 per annum, following complete replacement of an earlier cable car system in 2015. It takes tourists from La Palud up to the Torino Hut at its top on Pointe Helbronner. Costing over €105 million, the Skyway Monte Bianco is regarded as the world's most expensive cable car installation.

Other recent enhancements to tourist infrastructure across the massif have included construction of a new, and ultra-modern Goûter Hut to accommodate the increasing numbers of mountaineers attempting the popular Goûter Route to the summit of Mont Blanc, and investment of €500 million in Les Grands Montets and other ski areas over a six-year period from 2014 onwards.

Increasing numbers of mountain tourists, ease of access into the high mountain environment, plus promotion and encouragement by tour companies offering ascents of Mont Blanc to people with little or no previous alpine experience, have led to an increase in mountain accidents and even inappropriate demands to be rescued. With up to 30,000 climbing parties now attempting to ascend Mont Blanc each year, it has gained the reputation of being one of the world's deadliest mountains. Deaths from mountaineering-related accidents across the Mont Blanc massif average almost 100 a year, with the majority occurring on Mont Blanc itself. There have also been various stunts, some of which the local authorities have called reckless or stupid. In recent years, guards have been placed on the most popular route of ascent to Mont Blanc's summit at peak periods in order to ensure that those entering the mountain environment are adequately equipped and skilled. This has led to calls to limit access to the most popular summits and for the mountains to be treated with greater respect.

=== Scientific research ===
The Mont Blanc massif has provided numerous opportunities for academic research, dating back to the very first ascent of Mont Blanc in 1786 during which Michel Paccard carried scientific equipment to confirm it as the highest summit. In 1820, an ill-fated expedition led by Dr Hamel included pigeons intended for release at varying altitudes to measure the impact of reduced air density on their ability to fly. In 1890, Joseph Vallot built a small meteorological observatory at approximately 4,350 m (14,272 ft) between the Dôme du Goûter and Mont Blanc's summit from where numerous measurements and scientific experiments were conducted. One study involved taking simultaneous temperature measurements made over many months at Chamonix, the Grands Mulets and at the observatory itself. In 1893, Pierre Janssen constructed an astronomical observatory on the top of Mont Blanc, partially buried within the summit ice to hold it in place. A 33 cm (13 in) telescope and a spectrograph for measuring the oxygen content of the sun were installed. The observatory was removed when it started to collapse around 1906.
Three examples of modern-day uses of the high mountains for scientific research include neutrino detection, uranium pollution monitoring and climate change:

- A neutrino detector was installed deep inside the Mont Blanc Tunnel in the early‑1980s in order to take advantage of the shielding from background radiation provided by the 4,800 meter water equivalent (m.w.e.) of solid rock surrounding it in every direction. In February 1987, the underground neutrino observatory reported the detection of a neutrino event, believed to have originated from the explosion of the SN 1987A supernova.
- In 2005, the technique of remote laser-scanning (LiDAR) was used for the first time in any mountain environment to research the impact of climate change on rock face stability. Seven sites in the Mont Blanc massif were selected, with the Tour Ronde being the first to be analysed. An area of its east face of 67,400 m^{2} (725,000 sq ft) was laser-scanned from a distance of 800 metres (2,625 feet). This revealed that over a twelve-month period the face had lost 536 m^{3} (18,900 cu ft) of rock. The project concluded that the high rockfall rate on the Tour Ronde and elsewhere in the massif was linked to the degradation of permafrost. This would formerly have held the mountain together more effectively, but it is now exposed to greater weathering through the freeze-thaw cycle of water, with maximum occurrence during warm summers. In 2015, climbers captured video footage of a huge rockfall on the Tour Ronde's east face, which suggests that instability continues in this area.
- In 2001, researchers from France, Italy and Korea published the results of a study into uranium contamination of the wider environment by wind-borne particles. They analysed an ice core that had been drilled to a depth of 140 m (459 ft) on the Dôme du Goûter, and at an altitude of 4,250 m (13,944 ft). It produced an accurate timeline of contamination levels going back 200 years and was the first published uranium concentration data for any alpine or polar icefield. Ice that pre-dated 1940 was shown to contain fairly uniform and low levels of uranium, consistent with natural background contamination. In contrast, ice that had been laid down after World War II showed large excesses. These were attributed to aerial transport of uranium dust, produced by extensive mining and milling operations that occurred in East Germany (and also in France to a lesser extent) between 1965 and the end of the 1980s. No evidence was found that either the 1986 Chernobyl disaster or other nuclear power plants had caused the high levels of observed uranium contamination.

=== Modern military history ===
French alpine troops (Chasseurs Alpins) ascend to the summit of Mont Blanc. Illustration from Le Petit Journal, 1901.

A troop garrison, known as the Casermetta, was active for many years at the Col de la Seigne, on the border between France and Italy. In the 1930s, during a period of increased international tension, the Mont Blanc massif was used by both countries wanting to demonstrate their military might, and large drills and troop exercises were undertaken at high altitude. During World War II, at a time when the French army had already been defeated by Nazi Germany, France found itself under attack again, but this time by Italian soldiers in many alpine locations including the area around the Col de la Seigne. Evidence of past fortifications and old firing points are still visible throughout the area

Towards the end of World War II, the highest engagement of the entire war occurred on the glaciers above Chamonix. With the Germans nearly defeated, and their garrison in Chamonix surrounded by the liberating forces, a contingent of Austro-German soldier—who were based around the Torino Hut on the Italian side of the massif—launched a dawn bombardment on Chamonix from positions adjacent to the cable car station on the Col du Midi. Their attack was met with fierce opposition from French resistance fighters, and took place at an altitude of 3,500 metres (11,500 feet). Nine of the attacking soldiers were killed, including their commander.

By 1932 France had established the École de Haute Montagne in Chamonix to train mountain troops, but in 1945 it was reconstituted to provide specialised mountaineering training, skiing and tactical skills to the entire army. It was later renamed as the École Militaire de Haute Montagne (EMHM) and it continues to fulfil that role to this day, training approximately 1,500 troops every year.

=== Incidents and tragedies ===
A number of noteworthy incidents have occurred across the massif over the last two centuries which stand out from the routine toll of mountain-related deaths, of which there are now approximately 100 per annum.

- 1820: First recorded deaths on Mont Blanc. Three Chamoniards die in a climbing group led by Dr Hamel.
- 1892: 175 people are killed in St Gervais and nearby settlements from the sudden release of meltwater from the Tête Rousse Glacier.
- 1895: Italian mountain guide, Émile Rey, dies during simple descent from Dent du Geant.
- 1946: A B-17 Flying Fortress crashes into the Aiguille des Glaciers. All eight crew are killed.
- 1950: Air India Flight 245 crashes close to summit of Mont Blanc. All 48 passengers and crew are killed.
- 1961: French jet fighter plane severs cable on Vallée Blanche Cable Car, killing six tourists and leaving 59 trapped.
- 1966 Air India Flight 101 crashes close to summit of Mont Blanc. All 106 passengers and 11 crew are killed.
- 1997: British mountain guide is successfully sued by six-year-old boy over father's death in a climbing accident on the Tour Ronde in 1990.
- 1999: Avalanche kills 12 people and destroys 17 houses in villages of Le Tour and Montroc - the worst incident in Chamonix for 90 years.
- 1999: A lorry fire in the Mont Blanc Tunnel kills 39 people.
- 2012: Ice fall triggers avalanche on Mont Maudit, affecting 28 climbers. Nine climbers killed, nine others injured.

== Access ==
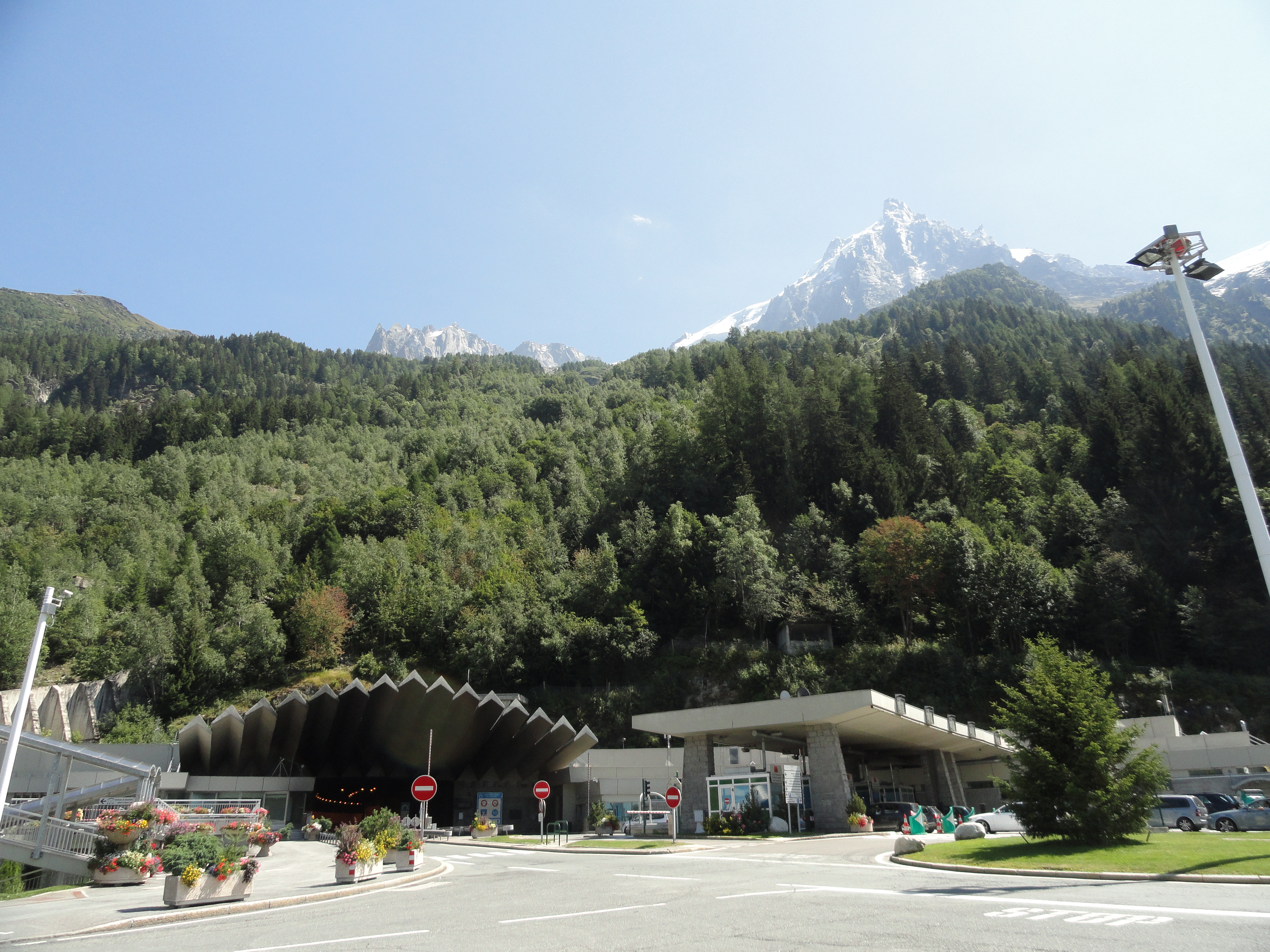
Chamonix-Mont Blanc Tunnel Entrance

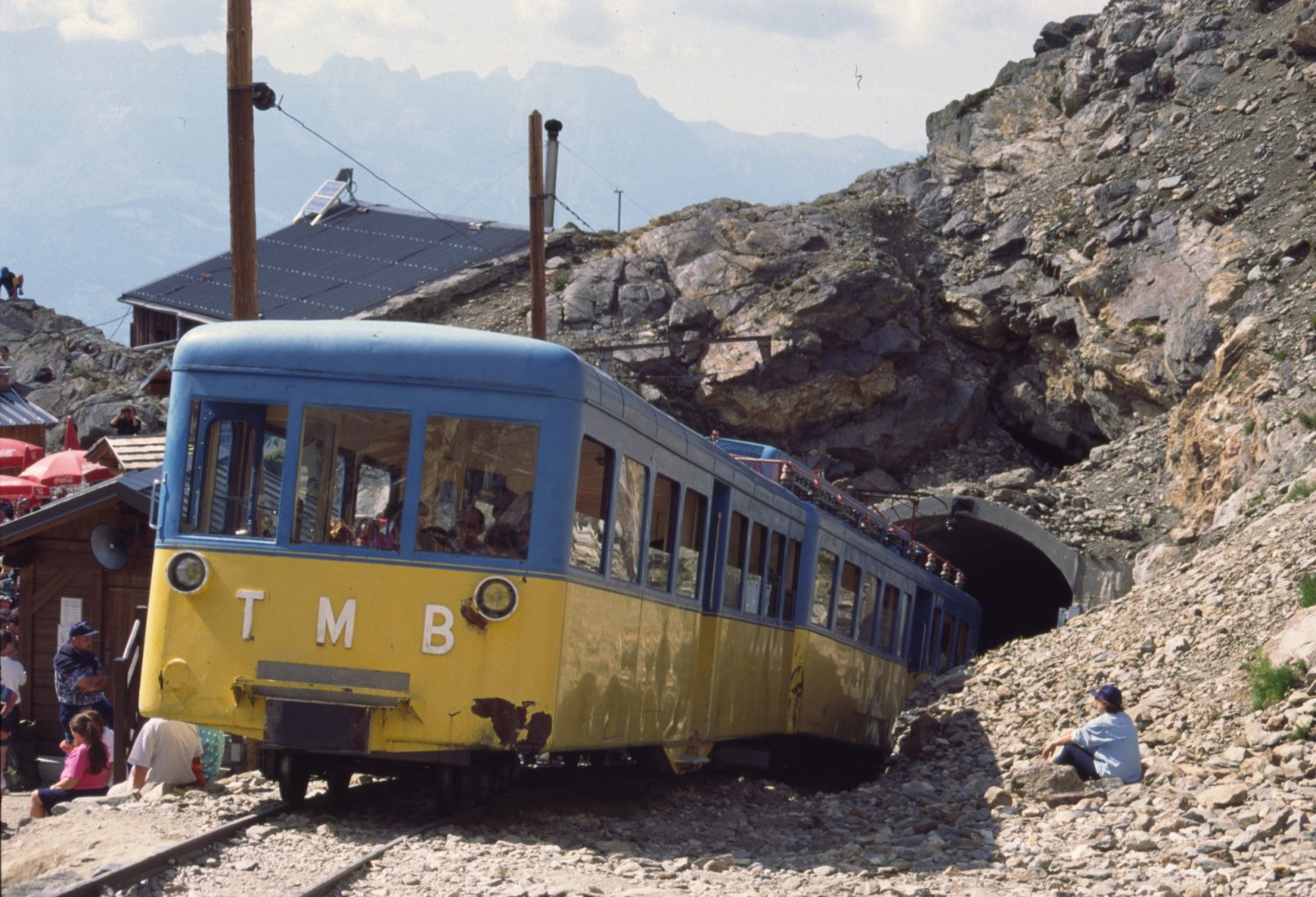
Mont Blanc Tramway (TMB) at the Nid d'Aigle in 1996.

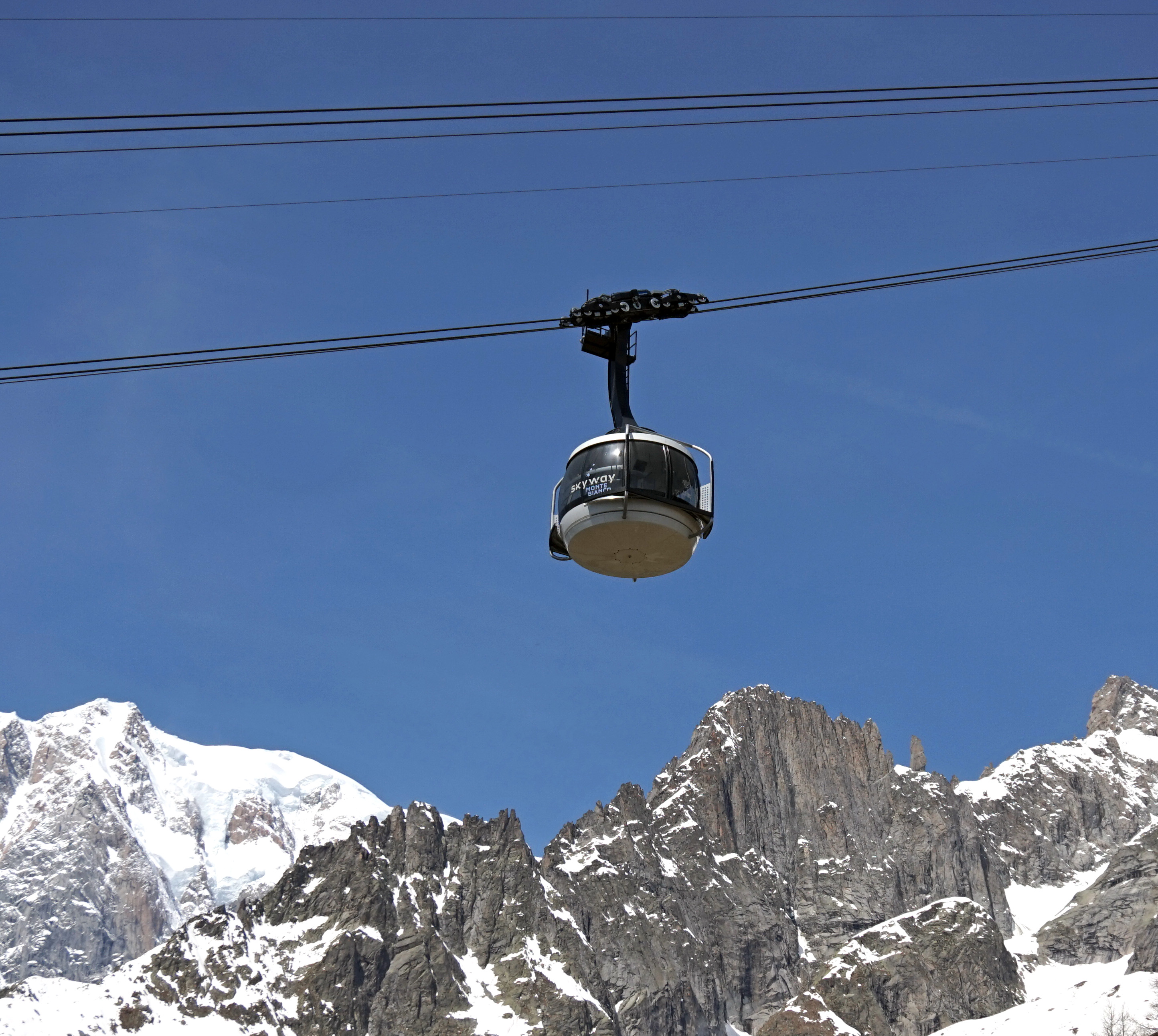
Rotating cabin on the Skyway Monte Bianco, Courmayeur

The Mont Blanc massif is accessible by road from within France via the A40–E25, or from Switzerland via Martigny and the Forclaz pass (1,527 m (5,010 ft)), or via Orsières to reach the Swiss Val Ferret. From within Italy the A40 from Aosta leads to Courmayeur, as does the higher mountain route from Bourg-Saint-Maurice via the Col du Petit St. Bernard (2,188 m (7,178 ft)).

The French and Swiss sides of the massif are linked since 1908 with a narrow-gauge railway running from Saint-Gervais to Martigny, via Chamonix and Finhaut. It is constituted by the Saint-Gervais–Vallorcine section and the Martigny–Châtelard section. Trains running on the line are called Mont Blanc Express.

The massif can be quickly crossed in a north–south direction by one of two transport routes, one aimed at through-traffic, the other intended solely for tourists:

1. The 11.6 km (7.2 mi) long Tunnel du Mont Blanc connects Chamonix and Courmayeur and permits cars and lorries to quickly reach the opposite valley. It took twenty years to complete and opened to vehicle traffic in 1965. The tunnel is known for an incident in March 1999, when a lorry caught alight inside; the resulting fire lasted 53 hours and killed 39 people. The tunnel was renovated in the aftermath, re-opening three years later. By 2008, 1,600 trucks and 3,200 cars were using the tunnel every day (1.8 million vehicles per year) – a little less than before the 1999 fire.
2. The Vallée Blanche Cable Car is normally used by visitors travelling from one or other of the tourist centres of Chamonix or Courmayeur and gives views over the glaciated regions of the massif. It crosses the massif in a roughly north–south direction and connects the Aiguille du Midi with the Point Helbronner, each of which can themselves be reached by téléphérique from Chamonix and Courmayeur, respectively.

Elsewhere in the massif, the Montenvers Railway connects Chamonix to Montenvers near the foot of the Mer de Glace, whilst the Téléphérique du Lognan connects Argentière with Aiguille des Grands Montets, where Les Grand Montets is an important winter skiing area in the region. At 3,300 m (10,827 ft), the summit station also provides relatively easy access for climbers to the northeastern peaks of the range, including short introductory rock scrambles and a simple ice-face route on the NW face of the Petite Aiguille Verte.

The Mont Blanc Tramway takes tourists and hikers from Saint-Gervais to the Nid d'Aigle, near the Glacier de Bionnassay. It also provides mountaineers with ready access to the first stage of the Goûter Route for an attempt on the most popular route to the summit of Mont Blanc.

From Les Houches, one of two cable cars links to Bellevue plateau (1,800 m (5,906 ft)), giving access to walking paths, mountain bike trails and winter ski-runs as well as to a halt on the Mont Blanc Tramway, A second links the town to the adjacent Prarion plateau (1,900 m (6,234 ft)).

Heli-skiing gives ready access to many remote or off-piste ski routes in the Mont Blanc massif. Because heli-skiing is banned across France for environmental reasons, companies offering this service only operate on the Swiss and Italian sides of the range.

=== Mountain huts ===
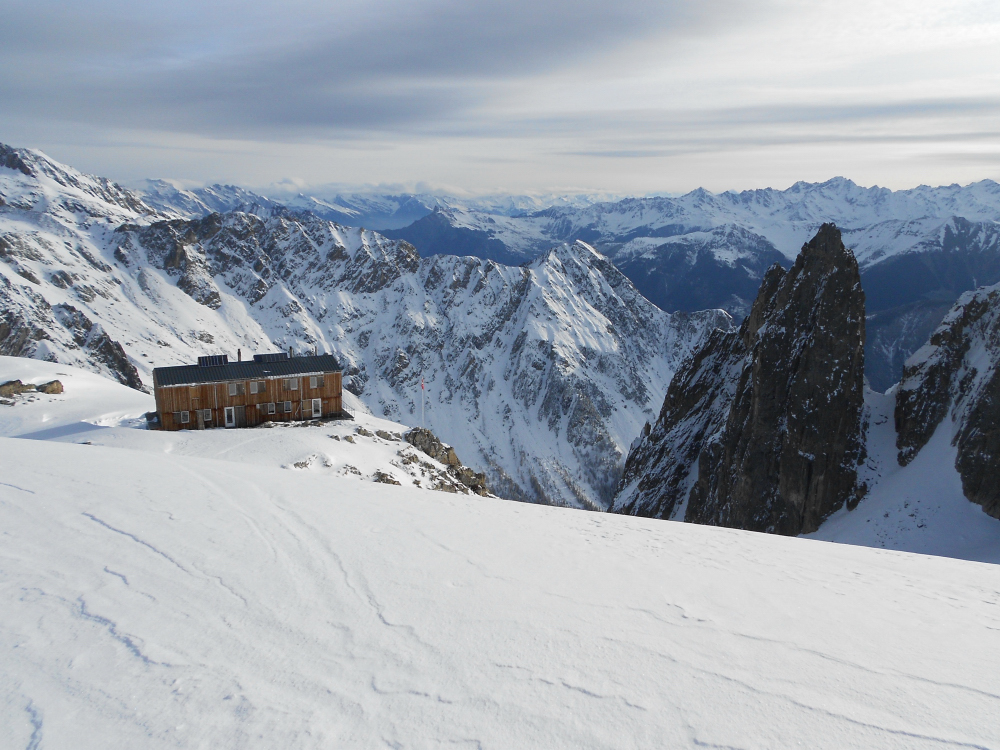
Saleina Hut, Switzerland. Capacity: 48 people, wardened. Photo taken in April.

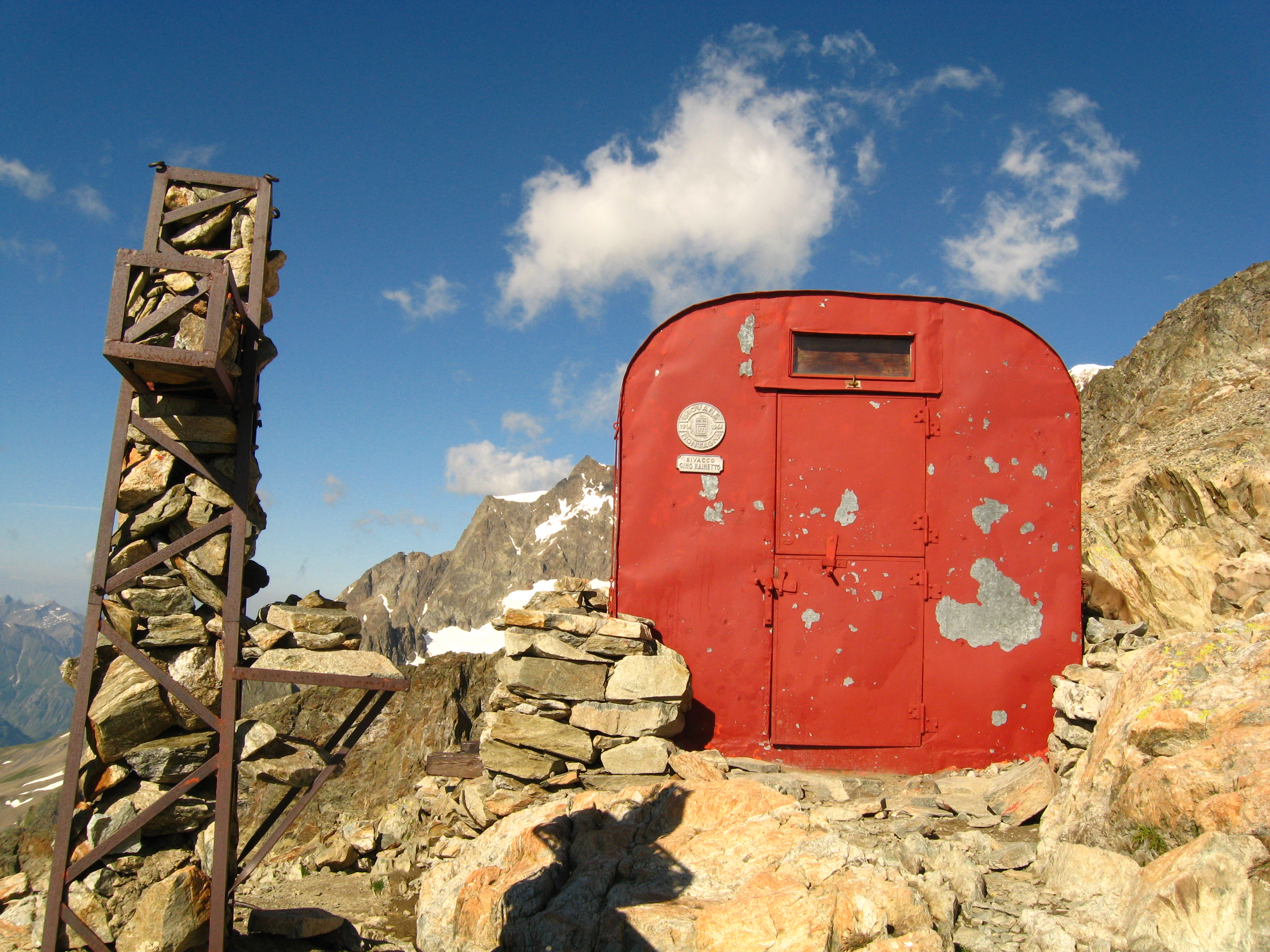
Bivouac du Petit Mont Blanc, Italy. Capacity: 9 people, unwardened.

Since the very early days of alpine mountaineering a number of high-altitude mountain refuges have been positioned strategically across the massif to give climbers easier access to the high summits by permitting an overnight stay. The majority are owned by national mountaineering clubs, and many are wardened during the summer months, although the smaller bivouac huts are unmanned and have very basic facilities.

Those on the most popular routes, such as the Goûter Hut, now require all climbers to pre-book. Some tiny huts, such as the remote Eccles Hut, can also be extremely crowded during good mountaineering weather, and some climbers prefer to bivouac outside.

Mountain huts of the Mont Blanc massif above 2,500 metres, sortable by name, country or altitude. If on a border they are listed by nationality of the owning body.
Mountain Hut name	Altitude (m/ft)	Country
Vallot Emergency Hut	4,362 m (14,311 ft)	France
Goûter Hut	3,817 m (12,523 ft)	France
Cosmiques Hut	3,613 m (11,854 ft)	France
Abri Simond Bivouac (Note: For winter use only. Abri Simond bivouac hut is only available in winter when the Cosmiques Hut is not open)	3,600 m (11,811 ft)	France
Periades Bivouac Hut	3,450 m (11,319 ft)	France
Tête Rousse Hut	3,170 m (10,400 ft)	France
Grands Mulets Hut	3,051 m (10,010 ft)	France
Durier Hut	3,358 m (11,017 ft)	France
Charpoua Hut	2,841 m (9,321 ft)	France
Argentière Hut	2,771 m (9,091 ft)	France
Albert Premier Hut	2,702 m (8,865 ft)	France
Couvercle Hut	2,687 m (8,816 ft)	France
Plan Glacier Hut	2,680 m (8,793 ft)	France
Conscrits Hut	2,602 m (8,537 ft)	France
Requin Hut	2,516 m (8,255 ft)	France
Leschaux Hut (Note: The Leschaux Hut is included in this list because, unlike all other 'hotels' at equivalent altitude on the edges of the massif, it is extremely remote, in the middle of the massif, and requires experience in glacier travel to reach it and gives unique access to certain climbing routes. See French IGN mapping portal)	2,431 m (7,976 ft)	France
Eccles Bivouac Hut	3,850 m (12,631 ft)	Italy
Canzio Bivouac Hut	3,852 m (12,638 ft)	Italy
Dames Anglaises (Craveri) Bivouac Hut	3,490 m (11,450 ft)	Italy
Jacchia Bivouac Hut	3,258 m (10,689 ft)	Italy
Ghiglione Bivouac (removed 1999)	3,690 m (12,106 ft)	Italy
Col de la Fourche Bivouac Hut	3,680 m (12,073 ft)	Italy
Quintino Sella Bivouac Hut	3,396 m (11,142 ft)	Italy
Torino Hut	3,375 m (11,073 ft)	Italy
Brenva Bivouac Hut	3,140 m (10,302 ft)	Italy
Gonella Hut	3,071 m (10,075 ft)	Italy
Petit Mont Blanc Bivouac Hut /Refuge Rainetto	3,047 m (9,997 ft)	Italy
Estelette Bivouac Hut	2,958 m (9,705 ft)	Italy
Gervasutti Bivouac Hut	2,833 m (9,295 ft)	Italy
Boccalette Hut / Refuge des Grandes Jorasses	2,804 m (9,199 ft)	Italy
Robert Blanc Hut	2,750 m (9,022 ft)	Italy
Dolent Bivouac Hut / Fiorio Bivouac	2,724 m (8,937 ft)	Italy
Triolet Hut / Refugio Dalmazzi	2,599 m (8,527 ft)	Italy
Monzino Hut (Private)	2,590 m (8,497 ft)	Italy
Trient Hut	3,170 m (10,400 ft)	Switzerland
Cabane d'Orny Hut	2,831 m (9,288 ft)	Switzerland
A Neuve Hut	2,735 m (8,973 ft)	Switzerland
Saleina Hut	2,691 m (8,829 ft)	Switzerland

== Environmental protection ==
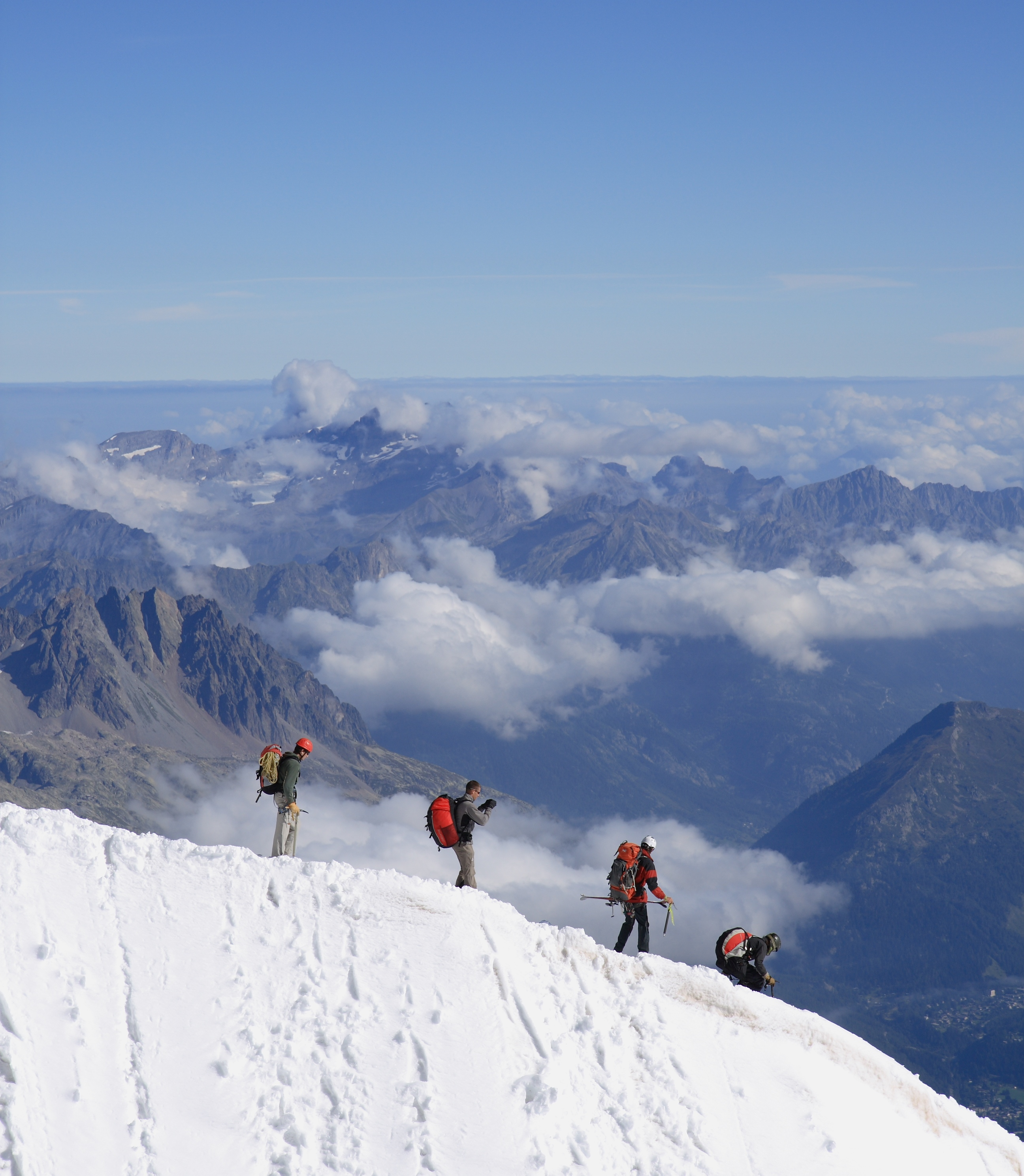
Alpine mountaineers descending from the Aiguille du Midi above Chamonix.

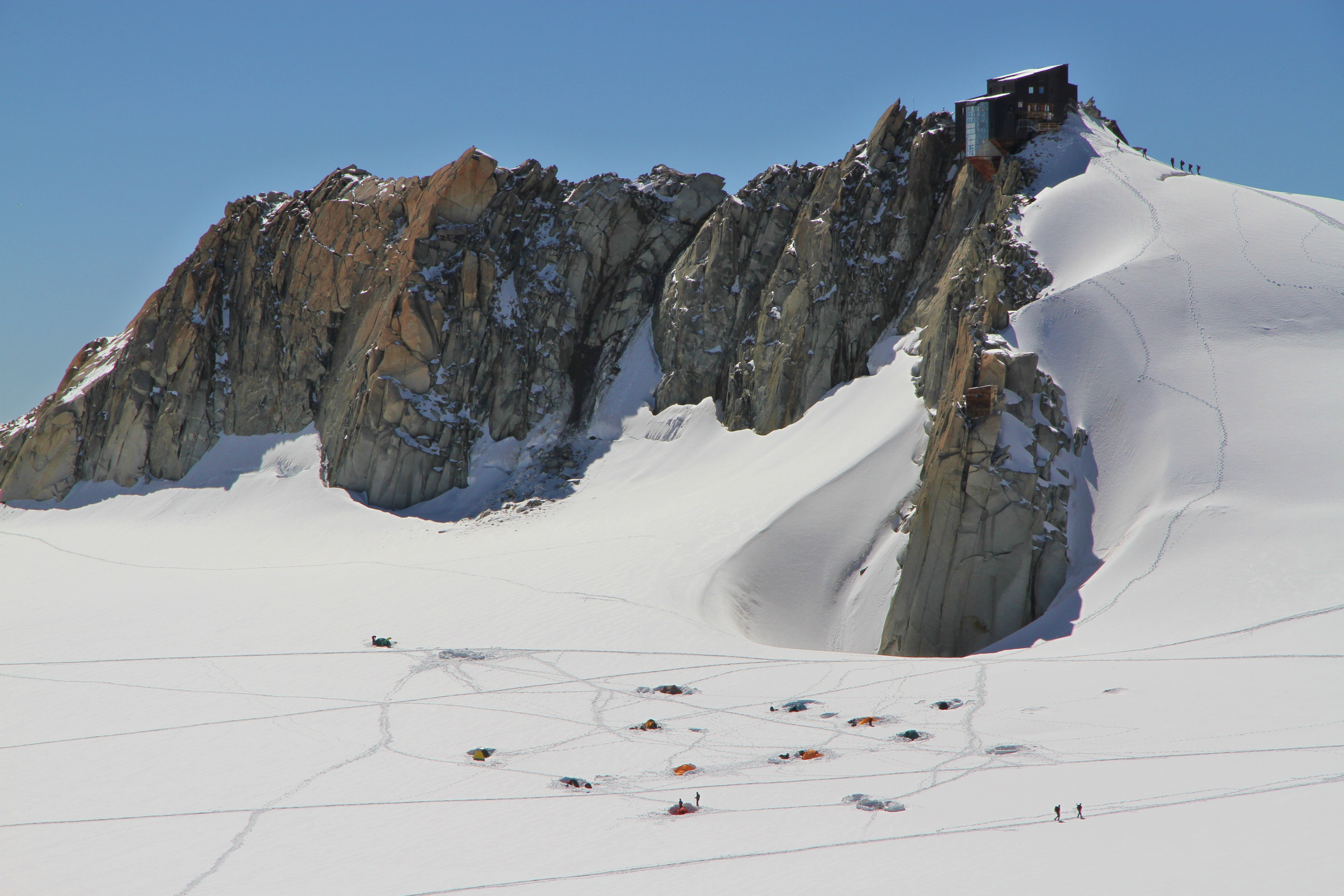
Cosmiques Hut near Aiguille du Midi with climbers camping illegally on the glacier below it. July 2010

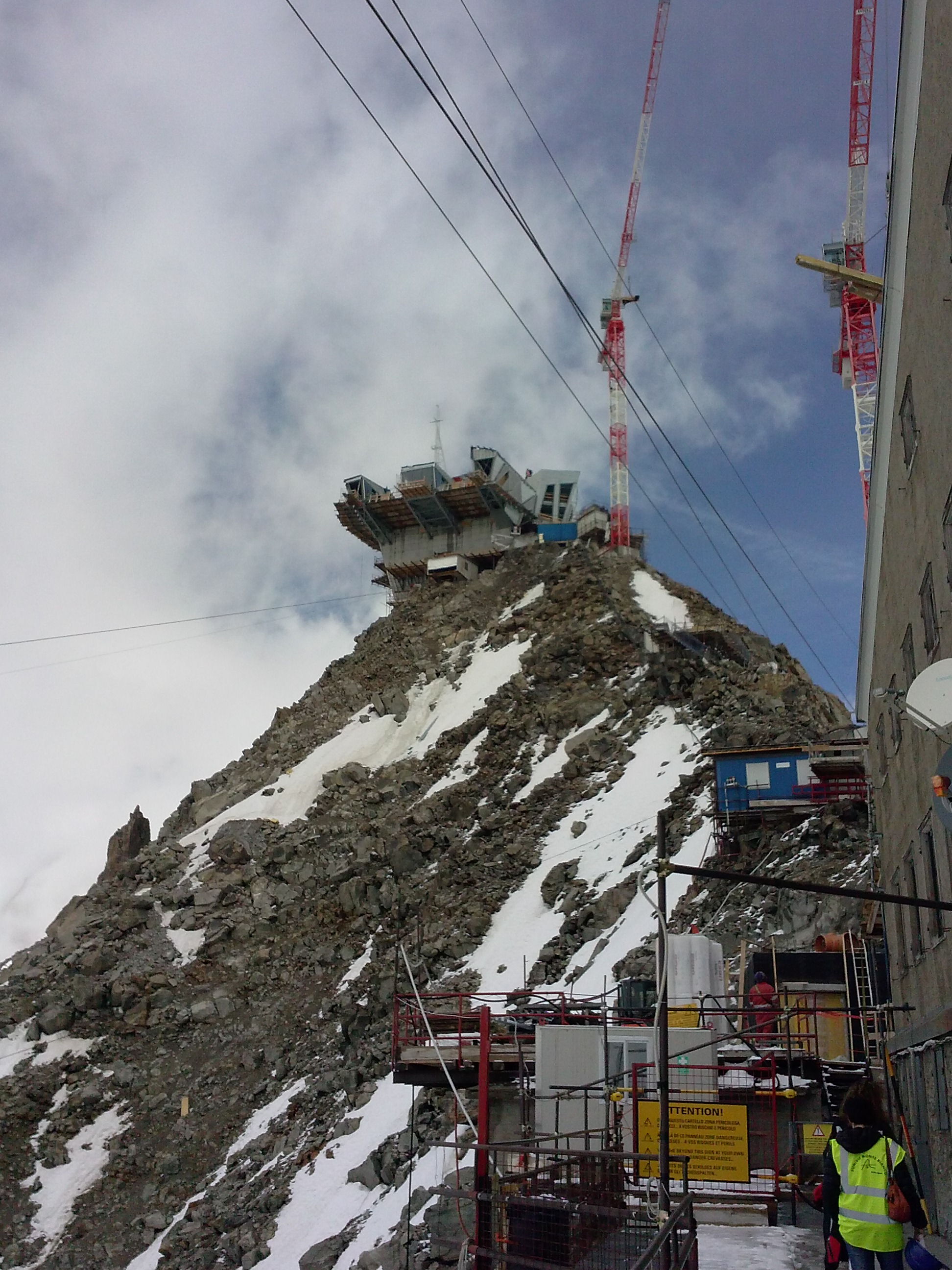
Construction work on the new Skyway Monte Bianco, 2014

Weather records show that since the 1960s there has been a trend of less snow at lower altitudes, whilst since the 1990s average mountain temperatures have increased more than at lower levels. Temperatures in Chamonix have risen by 1.5 °C over the last 75 years, and fresh snow build-up has halved there in the last 40 years, and there has been an increase in the melting and retreat of the massif's glaciers. The Mer de Glace has retreated 2,300 m (7,500 ft) in length since 1820 and, at Montenvers, has reduced in thickness by 150 m (490 ft). In the last 20 years the glacier has been retreating at a rate of around 30 m (98 ft) every year. Since 1994 it has lost 500 m (1,600 ft) in length and 70 m (230 ft) in depth.

To help counter these effects, in 2012 the various Chamonix-Mont Blanc authorities introduced a climate and energy action plan, committing the region to a 22% reduction in its greenhouse gas emissions by 2020. The plan included proposals to improve air quality by banning those lorries from using the Mont Blanc Tunnel which were deemed to be the most polluting and which, at times, had reduced air quality to levels more usually associated with the streets of Paris.

Concerns over the state of the environment around the most popular parts of the Mont Blanc massif, and the need for visitors to better respect it, were reflected in a statement in 2014 by Jean-Marc Peillex, the mayor of Saint-Gervais, who said:

Mont Blanc is a heap of garbage ... a mountain covered with the crap, urine and detritus of the last 50 years. The problems are covered up by a nice, white blanket of snow. But I want to confront people with the reality and to reach those people who abuse the mountain.

Following the construction of the new Goûter Hut used by most climbers ascending Mont Blanc, the authorities now strictly enforce a 'no wild-camping' ban above the level of Tête Rousses Hut. Each high altitude hut faces its own individual challenges, often relating to water and energy supply or waste management, and the provision of services to visitors can sometimes conflict with environmental protection. A range of individual solutions for a selection of huts within the massif and elsewhere in the Alps was identified by a project run by Espace Mont Blanc between 2007 and 2013.

=== Espace Mont Blanc ===
In 1991, the environment ministers for France, Italy and Switzerland came together to agree the formation of Espace Mont Blanc – a partnership of national authorities and local communities to plan for the future development and protection of the Mont Blanc region. In 1998, the group was charged with creating a sustainable development scheme for the region (finally launched in 2005), whilst in 2003 it adopted a plan for safeguarding sensitive environments and landscapes. In 2007, it produced its position statement regarding the classification of Mont Blanc as a UNESCO World Heritage Site, and in 2009 a Transboundary Integrated Plan (PIT) was announced, with the implementation of six regional projects running until 2013. In 2014, the group launched "Strategy for the Future", which is intended to be a strategic tool for ensuring that public policies are consistent across the different territories around the Mont Blanc massif.

=== Protected statuses ===
In 1951 the French portion of the Mont Blanc massif was classified as a Site classé (or 'listed site') and this was extended in 1976 to cover 253.54 km^{2} (97.89 mi^{2}). By 1989 there had been calls for the creation of an International Park for Mont Blanc. In June 2000 France did add the Mont Blanc Massif to UNESCO's Tentative List, which is a first step to formal nomination for World Heritage Site status. This was followed in January 2008 by a cross-border submission from Italy, which included France and Switzerland. However, as of 2016, it had neither a national park designation nor UNESCO World Heritage Site status. As a result of long delays, many environmental groups from France, Italy and Switzerland have worked together under the umbrella organisation, proMONT BLANC, to jointly raise concerns and to put pressure on national governments and the European Union to support and make quicker progress with World Heritage classification. In 2012 the organisation published a detailed assessment and supportive rationale into the state of the Mont Blanc application to be a World Heritage Site. ProMont Blanc also undertakes reviews of a suite of 24 environmental, 24 economic and 10 social indicators across 15 towns around the massif (seven French, five Italian and three Swiss), and monitors and reports on the effectiveness of measures intended to deliver sustainable development across the region.

In October 2017 representatives from all three nations finally signed a joint declaration of intent as the first formal step towards submitting a bid for the Mont Blanc massif to be a candidate for inclusion on UNESCO's World Heritage Site list.

All the French parts of the Mont Blanc massif, plus the neighbouring Aiguille Rouges range, have been listed as a Zone naturelle d'intérêt écologique, faunistique et floristique (ZNIEFF). This does not give regulatory protection, but is a recognition of the outstanding biodiversity of the area, and of its landscape, geomorphological, geological, historical and scientific importance. The 2011 schedule documents list over 150 species of animals and plants for which the massif is important. In Italy, the whole Val Ferret watershed was designated a Special Protection Area (Italian: Zone di Protezione Speciale) in 2003, and this 90.8 km^{2} (35.1 sq mi) area now forms part of the European Union's Natura 2000 network of protected sites.

Despite these individual designations, the Mont Blanc massif as a whole is still regarded by conservationists as representing an important missing link in the wider network of protected areas of the western Alps.

== See also ==
- Compagnie des Guides de Chamonix
- Haute Route
