= Grand Flambeau =

Mountain peak in the Mont Blanc massif

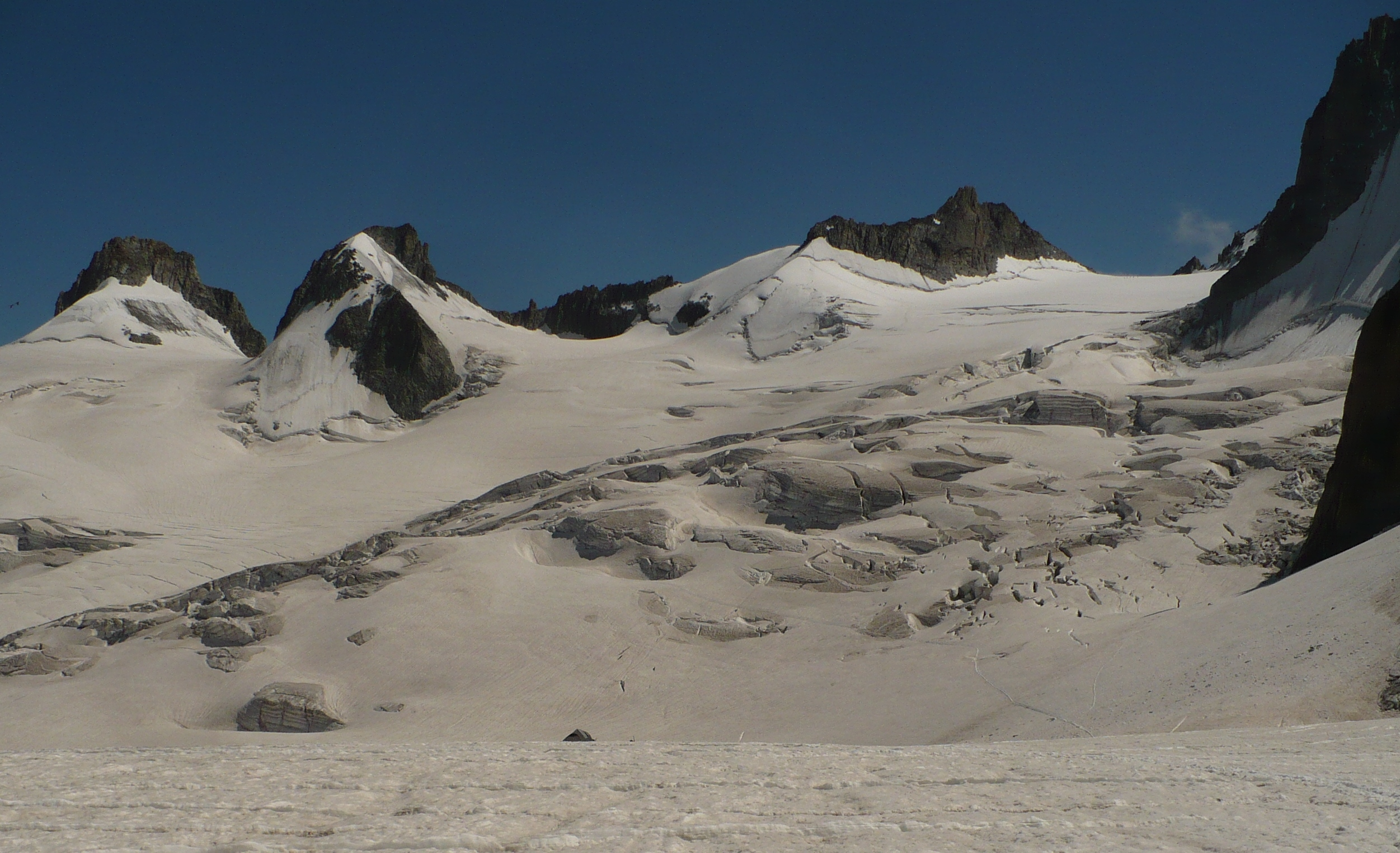
- The Grand Flambeau (left) with the Aiguille de Toule (centre-left) and the Aiguilles d'Entrèves (on the right). North face of Tour Ronde on extreme right.

Highest point
- Elevation: 3,559 m (11,677 ft)
- Prominence: 169 m (554 ft)
- Coordinates: 45°50′51″N 6°55′39″E

Geography
- Location within Alps
- Parent range: Mont Blanc massif

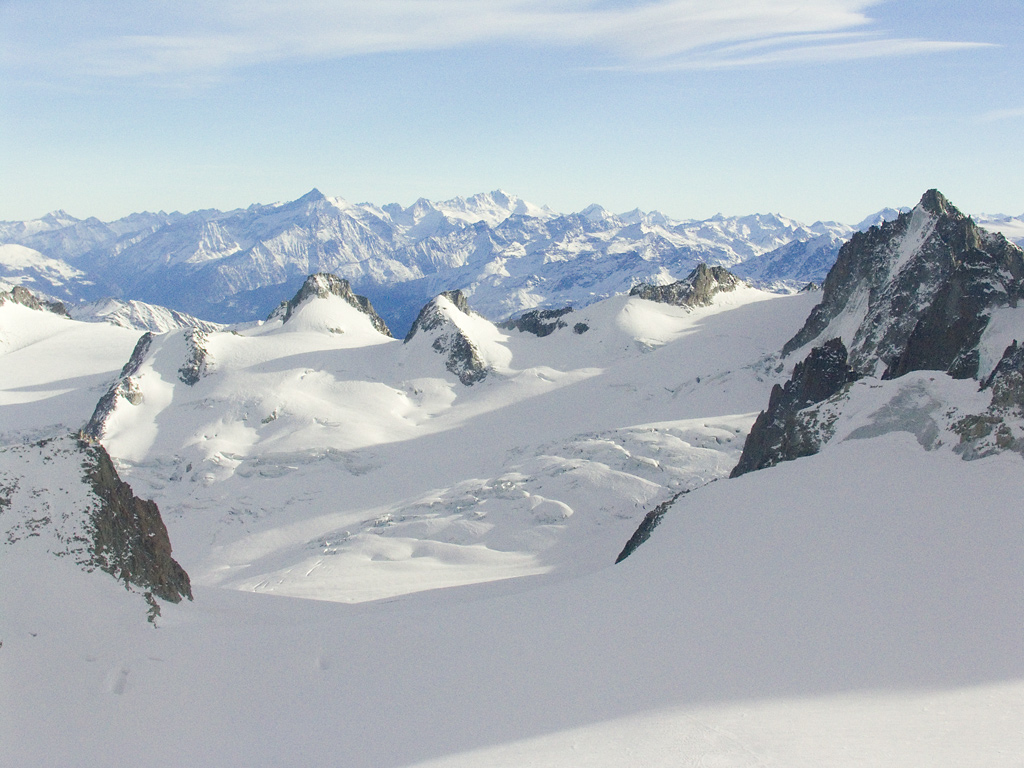
View from the Aiguille du Midi. Left to right: Grand Flambeau, Aiguille de Toule, Aiguilles d'Entrèves and Tour Ronde

The Grand Flambeau (3,559 metres (11,677 ft)) is a mountain peak in the Mont Blanc massif of the Alps. It is situated at the head of the Géant Glacier, approximately 0.5 km (0.31 mi) east of the Aiguille de Toule, between the Col Orientale de Toule and the Col de Saussure.

Its summit is one of a number which form part of the mountainous frontier ridge between France and Italy which runs eastwards from Mont Blanc towards the Grandes Jorasses and Mont Dolent. It can be readily accessed from the Torino Hut/Pointe Helbronner, either by its north or southeast ridges, and provides an excellent viewpoint.

To the north, a satellite peak - the Petit Flambeau (3,440 metres (11,290 ft)) - rises a small distance above the Géant Glacier.

== Climbing ==
The Grand Flambeau was first climbed on 20 July 1876 by Henri Cordier, Jacob Anderegg and Kaspar Maurer by means of the mountain's south-east ridge. This route, following the frontier ridge from the Col du Saussure, remains the easiest way to reach the summit and, on the French adjectival climbing scale, is graded at F+/PD-.
