= Aiguille de Toule =

Mountain peak in the Mont Blanc massif

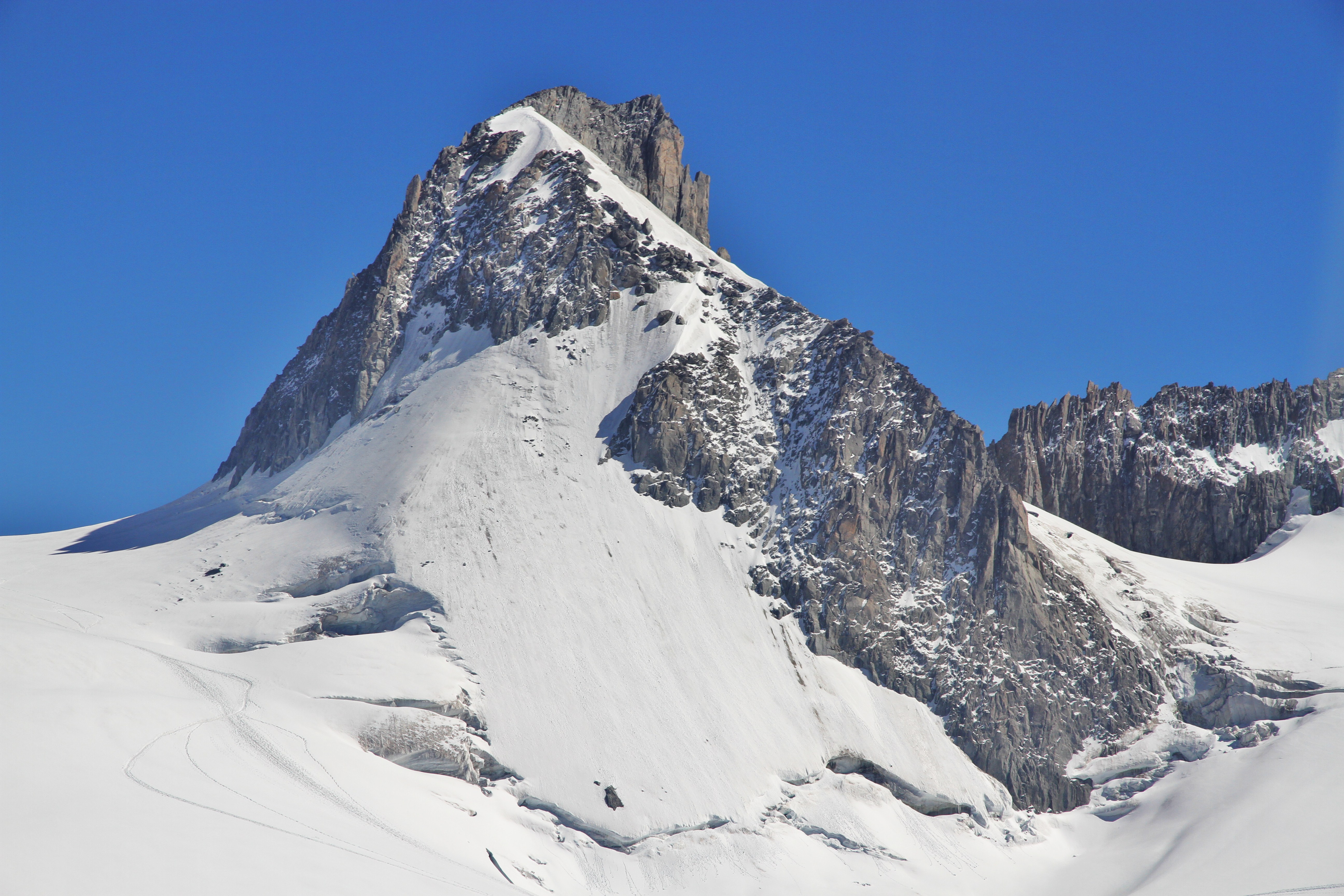

Highest point
- Elevation: 3,534 m (11,594 ft)
- Listing: Mountains of France; Mountains of Italy
- Coordinates: 45°50′53″N 6°55′19″E

Geography
- Location within Alps Location within France Location within Italy
- Parent range: Mont Blanc massif

Climbing
- Access: From Torino Hut

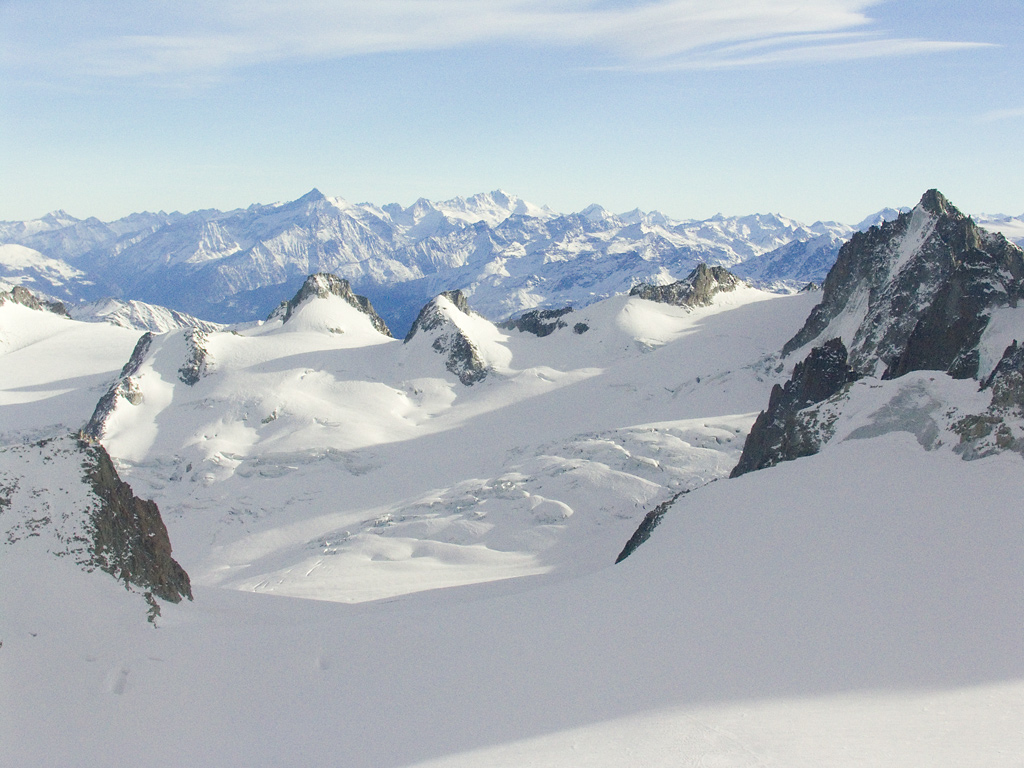
View from the Aiguille du Midi. Left to right: Grand Flambeau, Aiguille de Toule, Aiguilles d'Entrèves and Tour Ronde

The Aiguille de Toule (3,534 metres (11,594 ft)) is a mountain peak in the Mont Blanc massif of the Alps. Its summit is one of a number which form part of the mountainous frontier ridge between France and Italy which descends eastwards from Mont Blanc and continues towards the Grandes Jorasses and Mont Dolent.

It is situated at the head of the Géant Glacier. It lies east of the Aiguilles d'Entrèves (from which it is separated by the Col Orientale de Toule) and west of the Grand Flambeau (from which it is separated by the Col Occidental de Toule.) It is sometimes referred to as the Aiguille de Toula.

== Climbing ==
The mountain was first climbed on 10 August 1895 by Giovanni Bobba, Luigi Vaccarone, Casimiro Thérisod and Pietro Re Fiorentin.

The Aiguille de Toule can be readily accessed from the Torino Hut/Pointe Helbronner. The easiest means of ascent is via the east face, a mixed rock and snow route, graded on the French adjectival climbing scale at F+/PD-.

Other short climbing routes on the mountain include the north and the northeast faces, both graded AD.
