= Aiguilles d'Entrèves =

Mountain peak in the Mont Blanc massif of the Alps

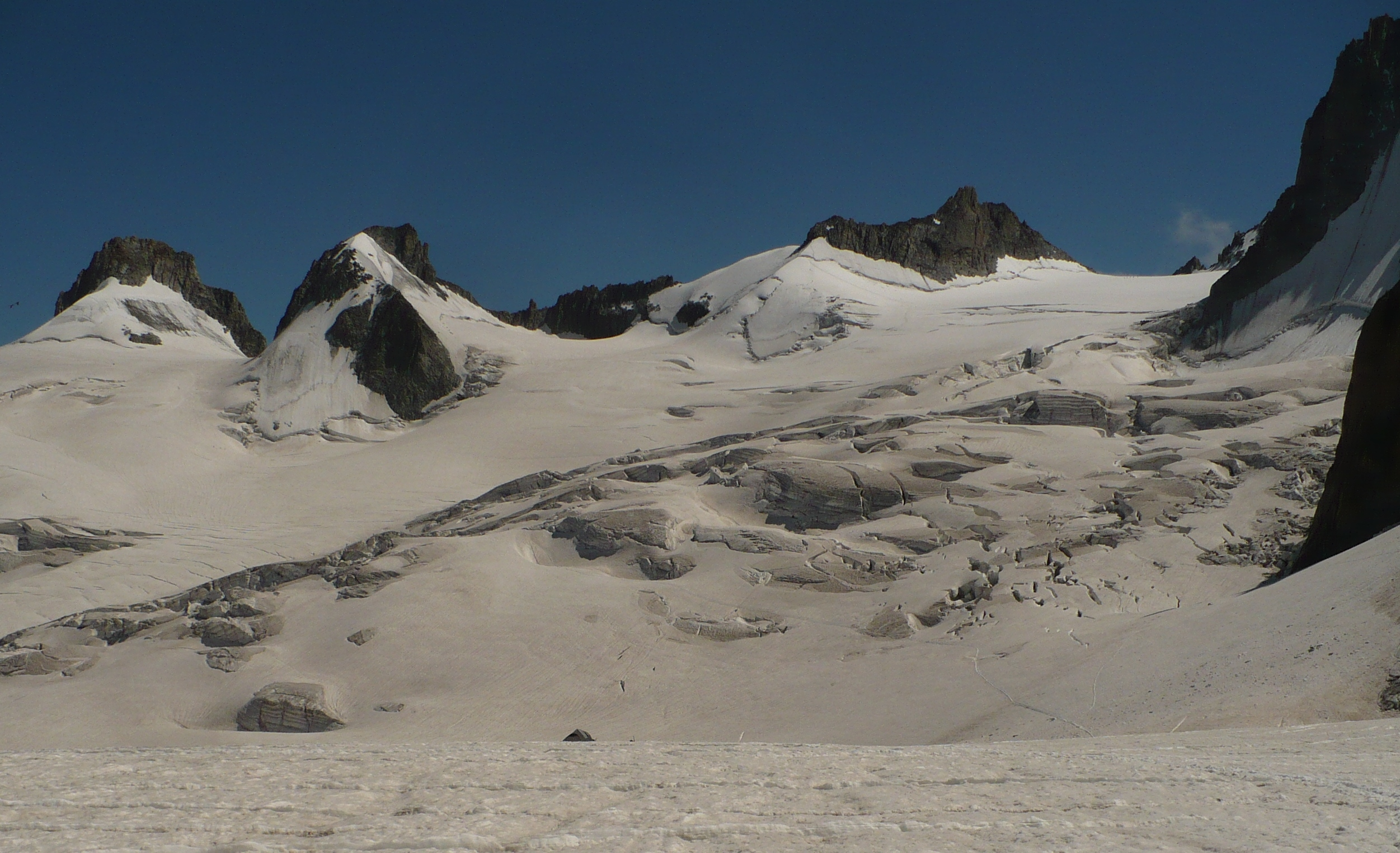
- The Grand Flambeau (left) with the Aiguille de Toule (centre-left) and the Aiguille d'Entrèves (on the right). North face of Tour Ronde on extreme right.

Highest point
- Elevation: 3,600 m (11,800 ft)
- Parent peak: Mont Blanc
- Listing: Mountains of France; Mountains of Italy
- Coordinates: 45°50′38″N 6°54′58″E

Geography
- Location within Alps Location within France Location within Italy
- Countries: France and Italy
- Parent range: Mont Blanc massif

Climbing
- First ascent: 31 August 1897

The Aiguilles d'Entrèves (3,600 m or 11,800 ft) is a mountain peak in the Mont Blanc massif of the Alps. It is situated at the head of the Glacier du Géant, and its rocky summit ridge forms part of the frontier between France and Italy. It lies east of the Tour Ronde, between the Col d'Entrèves and the Col Occidental de Toule. It has a steep, sound face of red granite and can be readily accessed from the Torino Hut/Pointe Helbronner.

== Climbing ==
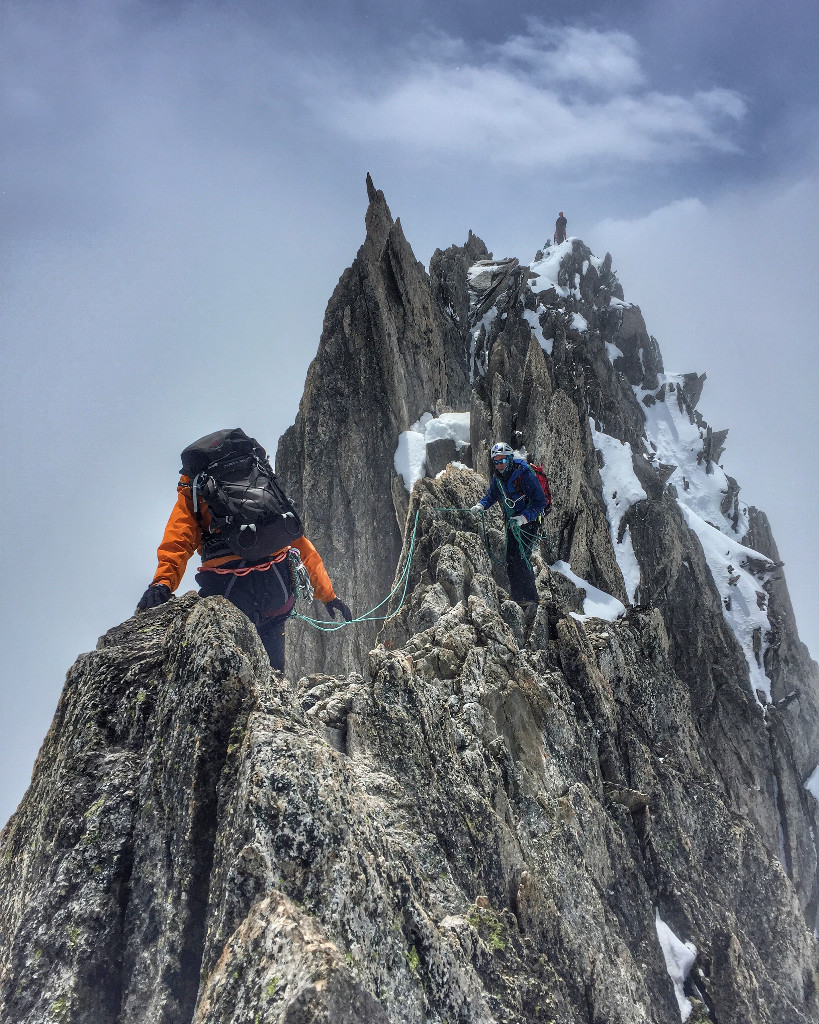
Simul climbing on the traverse of Aiguilles d'Entrèves (AD 4c)

The Aiguilles d'Entrèves was first climbed on 31 August 1897, by Adolfo Hess, Flavio Santi and Julien Proment.

The easiest means of ascent is via the mountain's NE ridge from Col du Toule.

An ascent via the SW ridge from the Col d'Entreves, followed by a traverse of its rocky, pinnacled crest and a descent via the easy NE ridge is a popular outing for many climbers. Grade: AD− (IV 4c)

Other routes: W face Grade IV/V 4 h from Torino hut.
