= Aiguille de la Brenva =

Mountain peak in the Mont Blanc massif

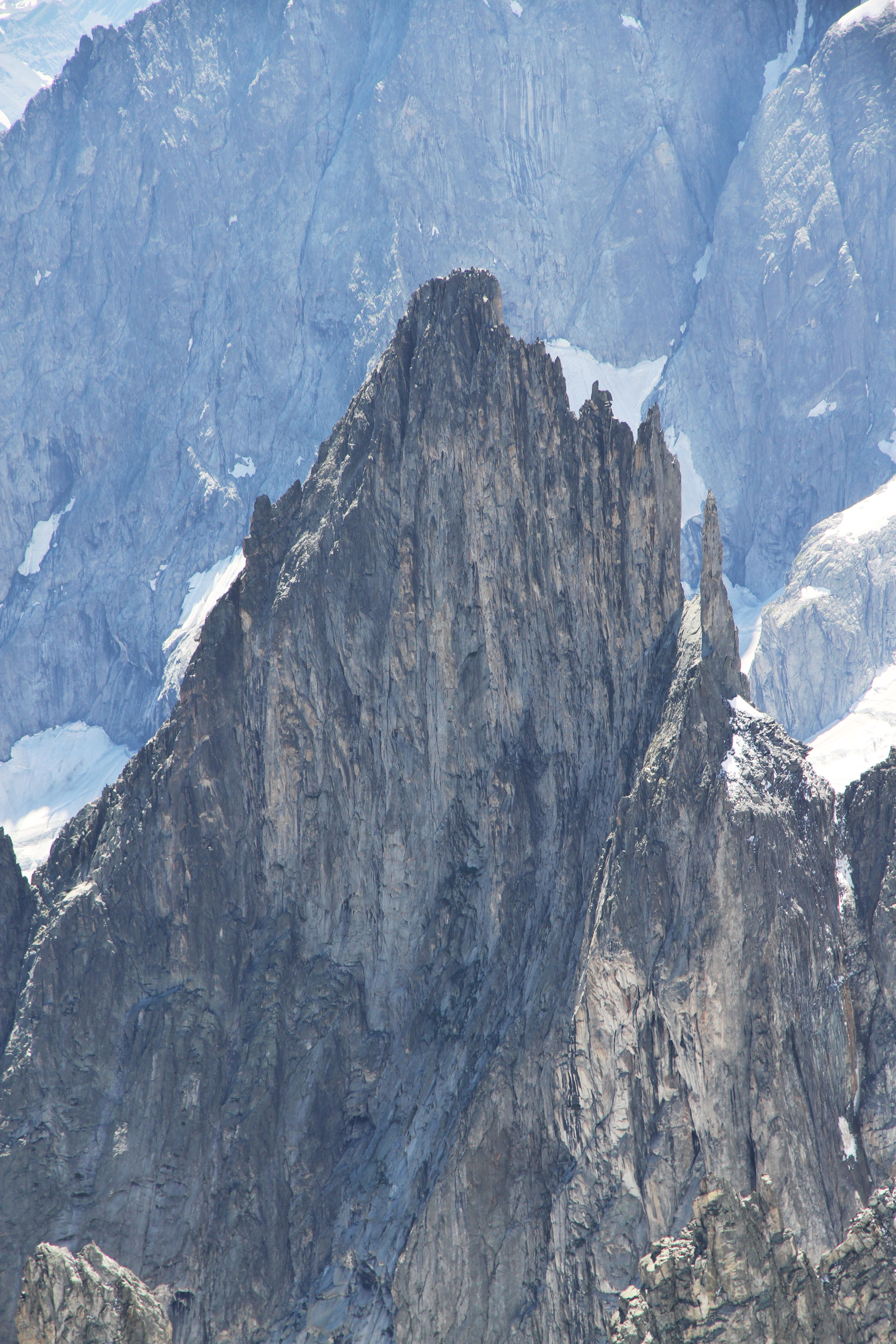
- View of east face. The 60-metre-tall (200 ft) Père Eternel is visible on the right flank, above the Brèche de la Brenva.

Highest point
- Elevation: 3,269 m (10,725 ft)
- Coordinates: 45°50′16″N 6°55′03″E

Geography
- Location within Alps
- Parent range: Mont Blanc massif

Climbing
- Access: From Torino Hut

The Aiguille de la Brenva (3,269 metres (10,725 ft)) is a remote rocky mountain peak in the Mont Blanc massif of the Alps. It lies wholly within Italy on a ridge descending south-east from the Tour Ronde. It has been described as "a spectacular fin with a fine E face". It stands on a ridge separating the Entrèves glacier from the Brenva glacier, yet is somewhat overshadowed by its larger neighbours, such as the Aiguille Blanche and the Aiguille Noire de Peuterey. Nevertheless, it is a distinctive peak, offering a number of very challenging climbs, especially on its east face, which consists of vertical granite flakes and cracks. On its northern side stands a distinctive, slender rock pinnacle about 60 metres high, known as the Père Eternel.

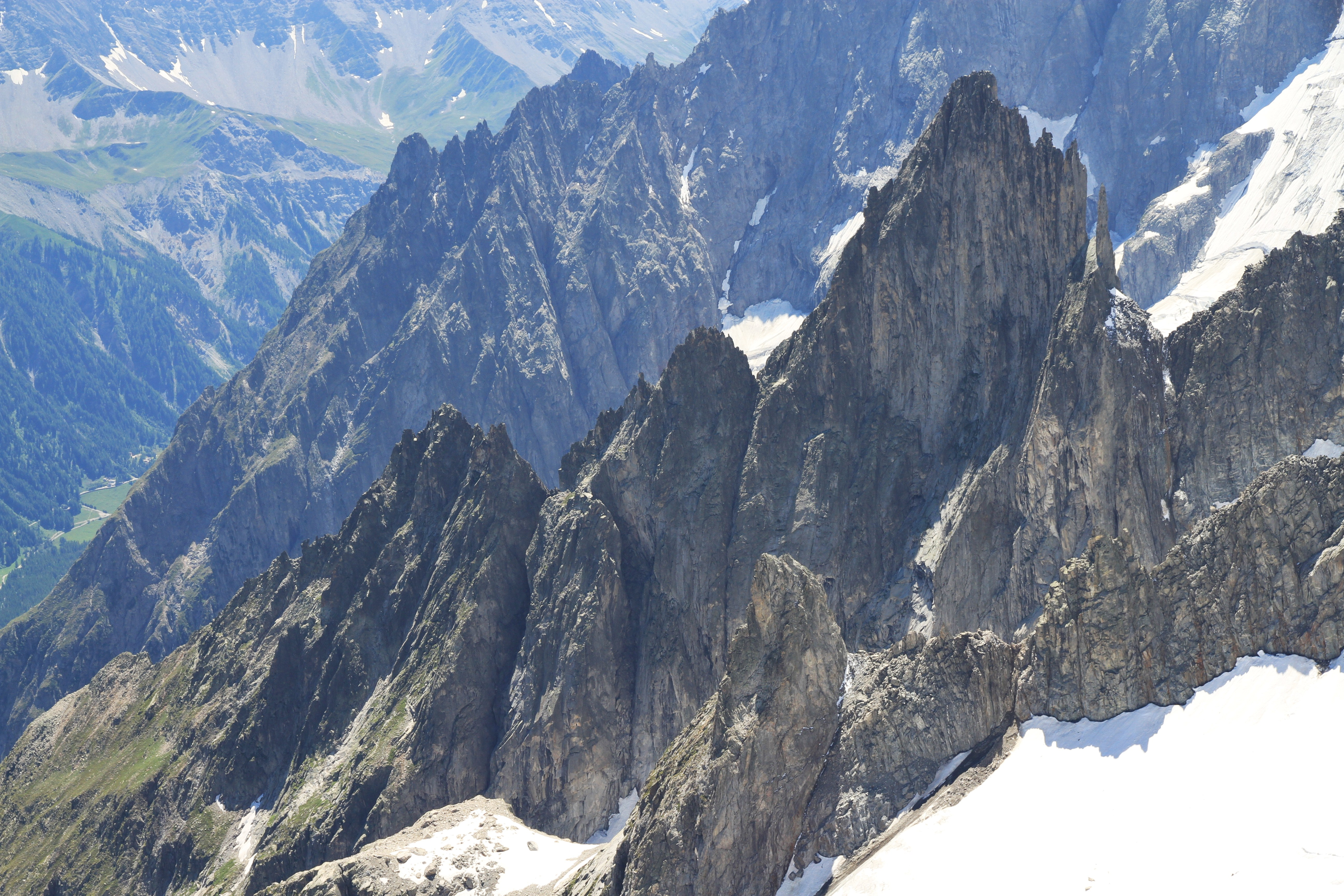
Brenva ridge from Pointe Helbronner. Right to left: Aiguille de la Brenva, Tour de la Brenva, Rocher de la Brenva

.

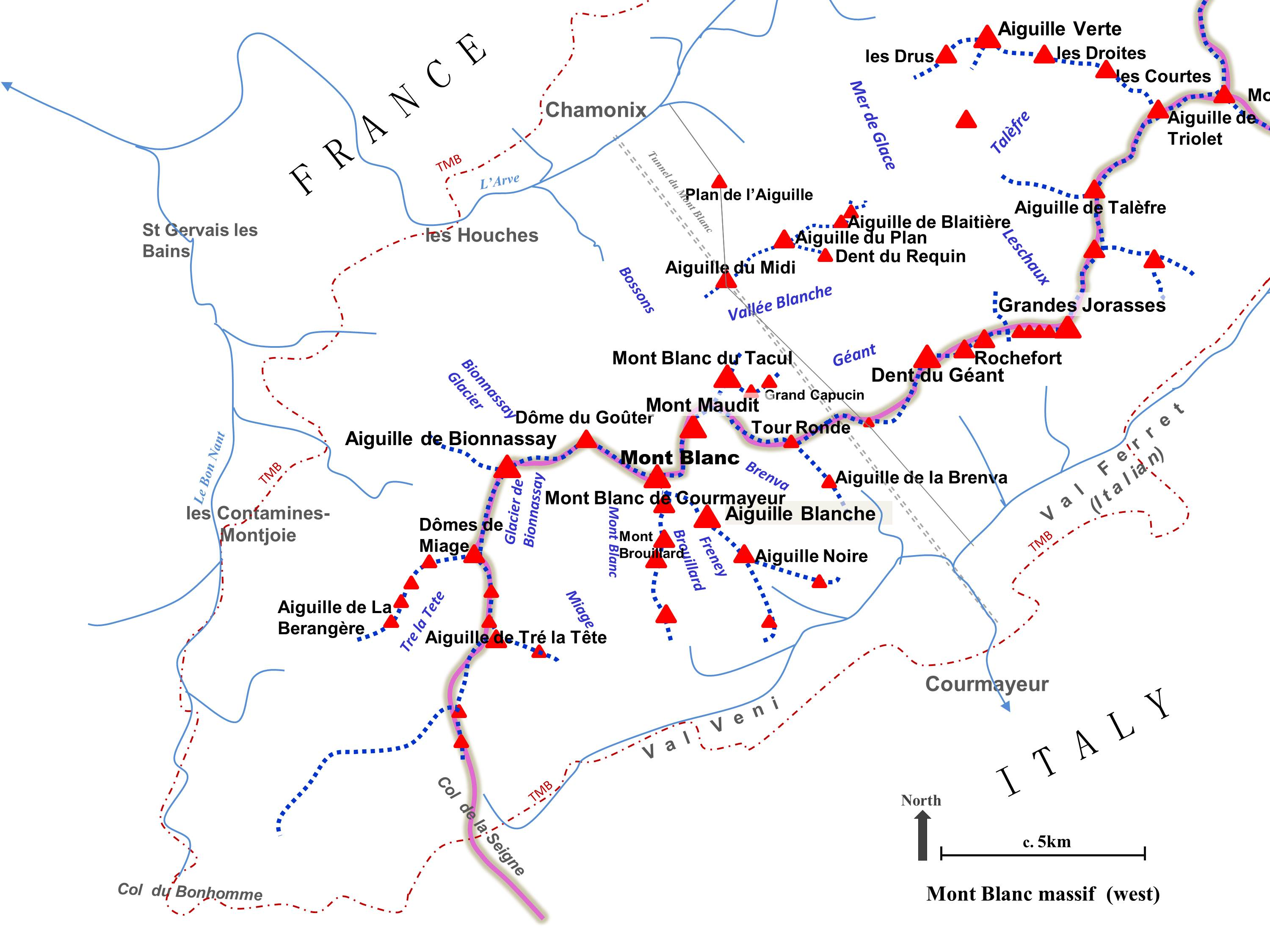
Mont Blanc massif showing location of Aiguille de la Brenva

== Climbing ==
The Aiguille de la Brenva was first ascended on 25 August 1898 by A. Hess, L. Croux and C. Ollier via its south-east ridge. This remains the least difficult means of ascent to this day. (Graded PD on the French adjectival climbing scale).

Nowadays, its east face offers a number of challenging climbing routes: the Donvito Diedre, the Bocallette route (UIAA Grade V/V+) (first established in 1935); the very hard Bertone-Zappelli route, plus the 390 m Rebuffat route (Grade V/V+), dating from 1948. The latter route is placed in 66th position by its first ascensionist, Gaston Rebuffat, in his classic mountaineering book "The Mont Blanc Massif - the 100 finest routes".

The peak's north ridge provides an exposed and strenuous 150 m climb, which is rarely undertaken (Grade V/V+).

The 60-metre-high (200 ft) Père Eternel pinnacle 3,224 metres (10,577 ft) was first climbed in August 1927 by L. Grivel, O. Ortiz and A Pennard. (UIAA Grade V/V+).

== Access ==
The peak can be accessed from the Torino Hut via the Toule glacier to reach the Brèche de la Brenva. It can also be climbed as a "training exercise" in one day, reached direct from Courmayeur by means of a "stiff walk".

== See also ==
- Portal:Alps
