= Col du Géant =

Main pass of the Mont Blanc massif

Coordinates: 45.846°N 6.935°E

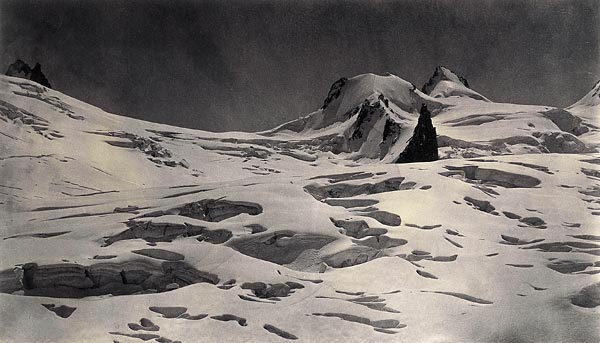
Col du Géant c. 1860

The Col du Géant (French pronunciation: [kɔl dy ʒeɑ̃]; lit. 'Pass of the Giant') at 3,356 m (11,010 ft) is the main passage of the Mont Blanc massif between Courmayeur in the Aosta Valley and Chamonix-Mont Blanc in the Arve Valley. On the French side, to the north is the Géant Glacier which overlooks the Mer de Glace.

== Geography ==
The pass is between the peaks of the Tour Ronde and the Dent du Géant. Near the pass are Pointe Helbronner and the Torino Hut.

There is a border dispute between France and Italy, similar to that which concerns the summit of Mont Blanc. Italian maps depict the border line on the pass, while on the French maps it passes a hundred meters to the south, the pass being entirely on French territory. Openstreetmap shows both variants of the border, and similar situations near the peak and the Dôme du Goûter. This dispute was revived in 2015, following a ban on access to the Giant glacier from the Torino refuge, by the municipality of Chamonix.

== History ==
In 1788, 48 year old scientist Horace Bénédict de Saussure spent 17 days making meteorological observations and physical measurements on the Col du Géant (3,371 m).
