= Aiguilles Marbrées =

Mountain peak in the Mont Blanc massif

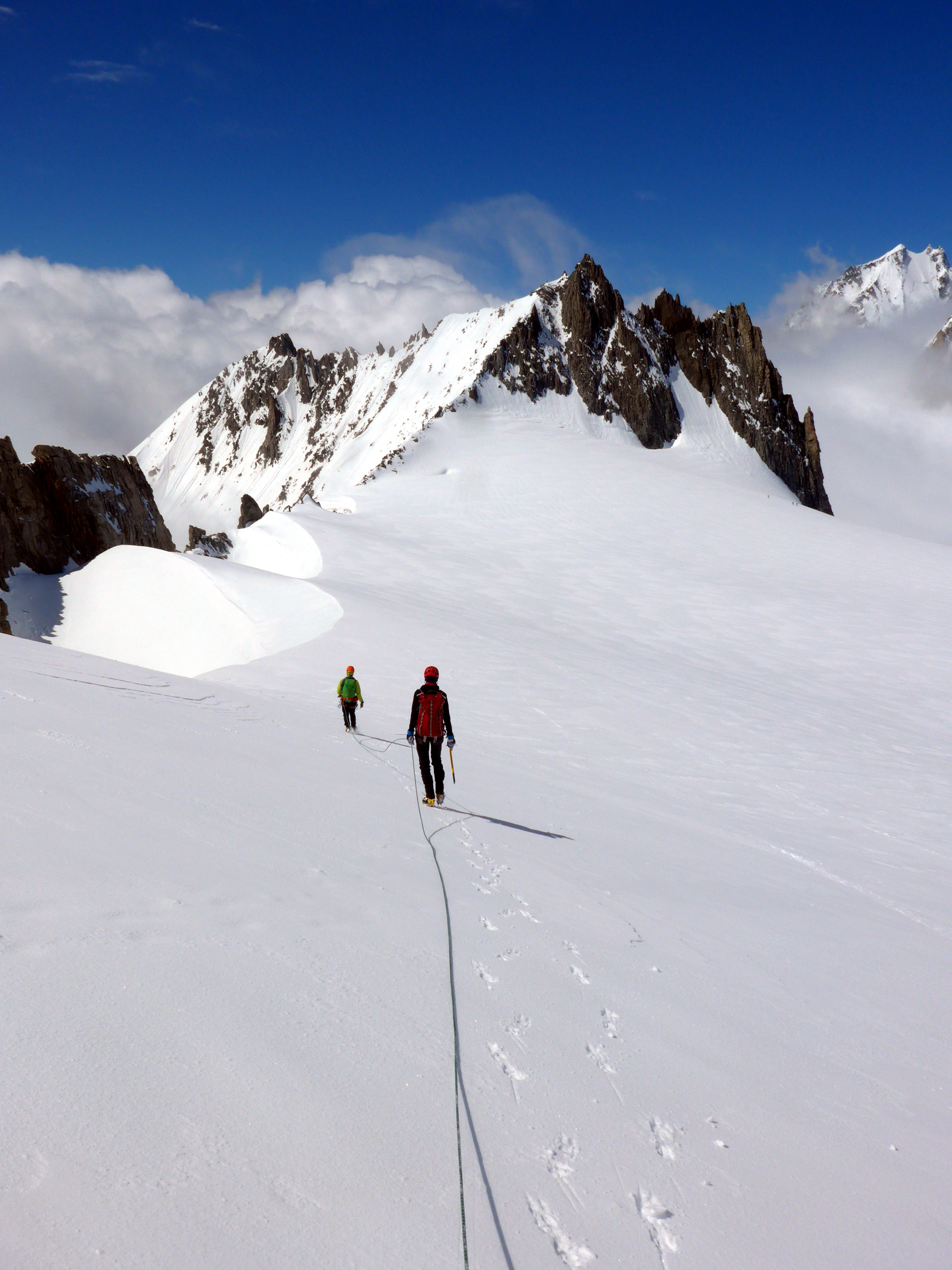

Highest point
- Elevation: 3,535 m (11,598 ft)
- Listing: Mountains of France; Mountains of Italy
- Coordinates: 45°51′05″N 6°56′28″E

Geography
- Location within Alps Location within France Location within Italy
- Countries: France and Italy
- Parent range: Mont Blanc massif

Climbing
- First ascent: 17 August 1876

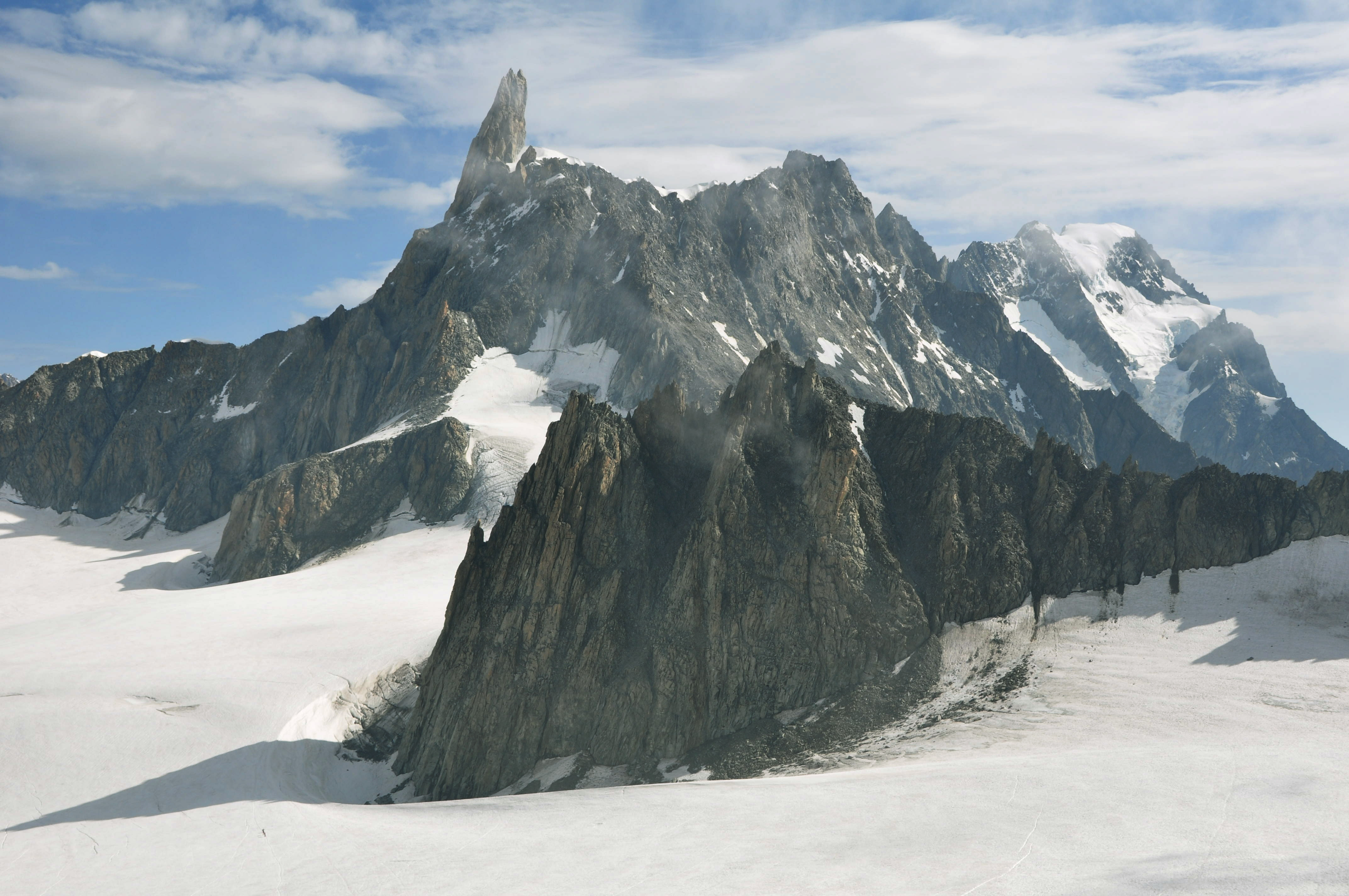
Aiguilles Marbrées (in foreground) viewed from near Torino Hut. In background: Dent du Géant (centre) and Grandes Jorasses (right)

The Aiguilles Marbrées (3,535 metres (11,598 ft)), (French pronunciation: [eɡɥijmaʁbʁe], literally "marbled needles") is a mountain peak in the Mont Blanc massif, above the Glacier du Géant, with its summits forming part of the frontier between France and Italy. It is situated between the Col de Rochefort and the Col du Géant, and is easily accessed from the Torino Hut at Pointe Helbronner.

Seen from the north, the mountain has a triangular appearance. It contains two summits, the northern one being the highest. The lower, southern summit (3,483 metres (11,427 ft)) is separated by a broken rock ridge.

== First ascents ==
The Aiguilles Marbrées was first climbed on 17 August 1876 by Lionel Dècle, Henry Devouassod and Edouard Coupelin, who reached its highest point via the NE slope. The first winter climb was made on 21 January 1907 by G. Carugati, Miss Carugati, Joseph Petigax and Laurent Petigax.

The first ascent of the lower southern summit was made on 22 July 1989 by A. Hess, O. Leitz and Laurent Croux from the Col du Géant and E Arête.

The summit is normally reached by an ascent of its northeastern ridge, from the Col de Rochefort (3,389 metres (11,119 ft)). The route is graded F+/PD- on the adjectival climbing scale.

There are a small number of rock climbing routes on the mountain

- North Summit (North-west ridge) Grade IV, one pitch of V. Height 270 metres, 3.5 hours (first ascent: G. Brignolo, Casteli and Marchiard, 1996)
- North Summit (West spur) 8 pitches, one of grade V. 3 hours (first ascent: H Boisier, J Chaffat, 8 September 1979)

== Geology ==
Geologically speaking, the Aiguille Marbrées is part of the 'Swiss Unit' of Mont Blanc, and consists mostly of medium to coarse grained granites, together with some porphyritic rocks.

== Rockfall research ==
A series of major rock falls occurred on the north side of the Aiguille Marbrées in summer 2007. This led to investment by the local authorities in research and monitoring of the state of the mountain. Both conventional surveying and photogrammetry were employed in order to create a geo-referenced digital elevation model of the mountain. This helped researchers understand the reasons for the initial rockfall, as well as providing a baseline study for comparison with future surveys after subsequent rockfalls.
