= Cyanometer =

Instrument for measuring blueness of the sky

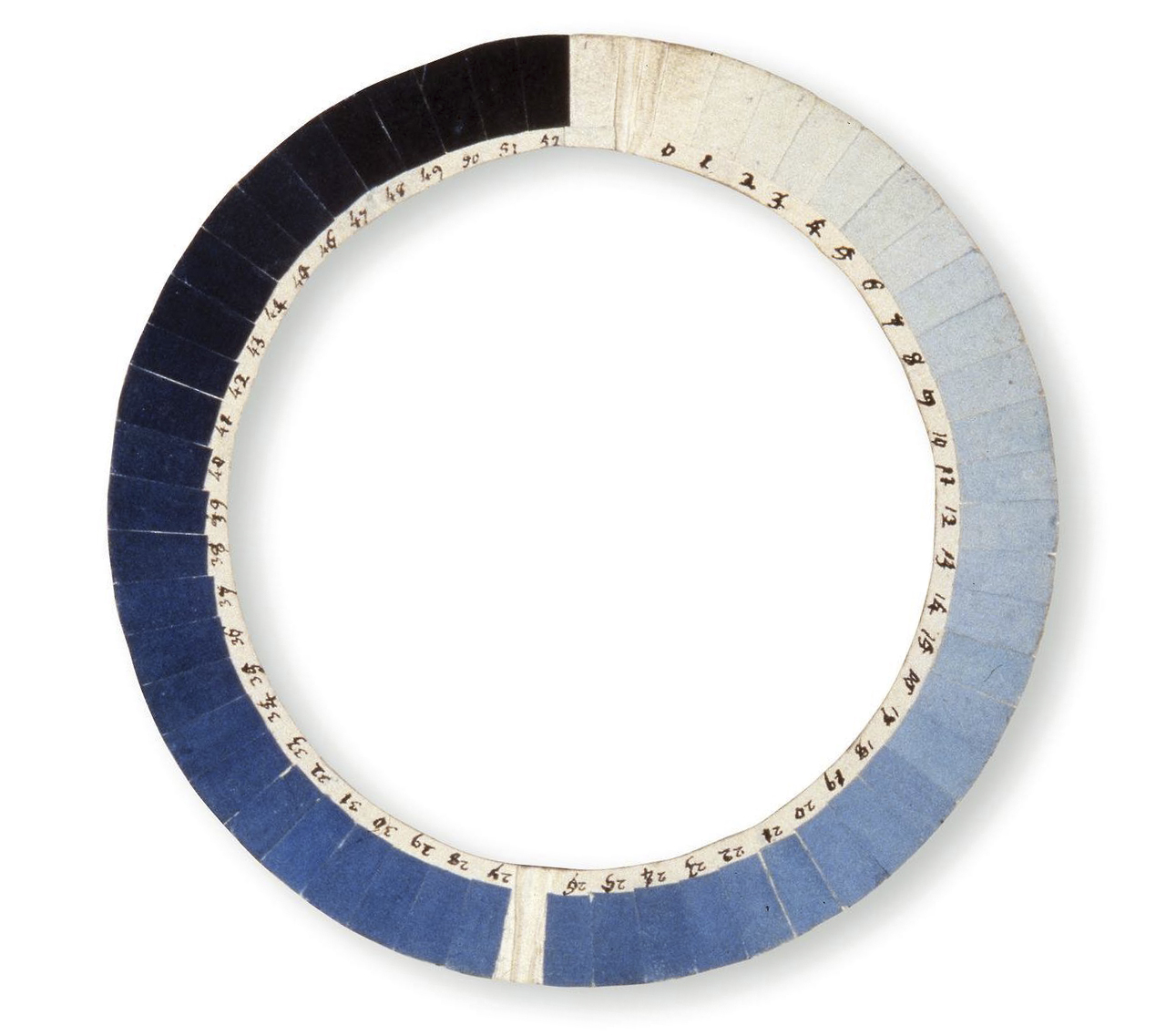
A cyanometer by Horace-Bénédict de Saussure (from the collection of Musée d'histoire des sciences de la Ville de Genève)

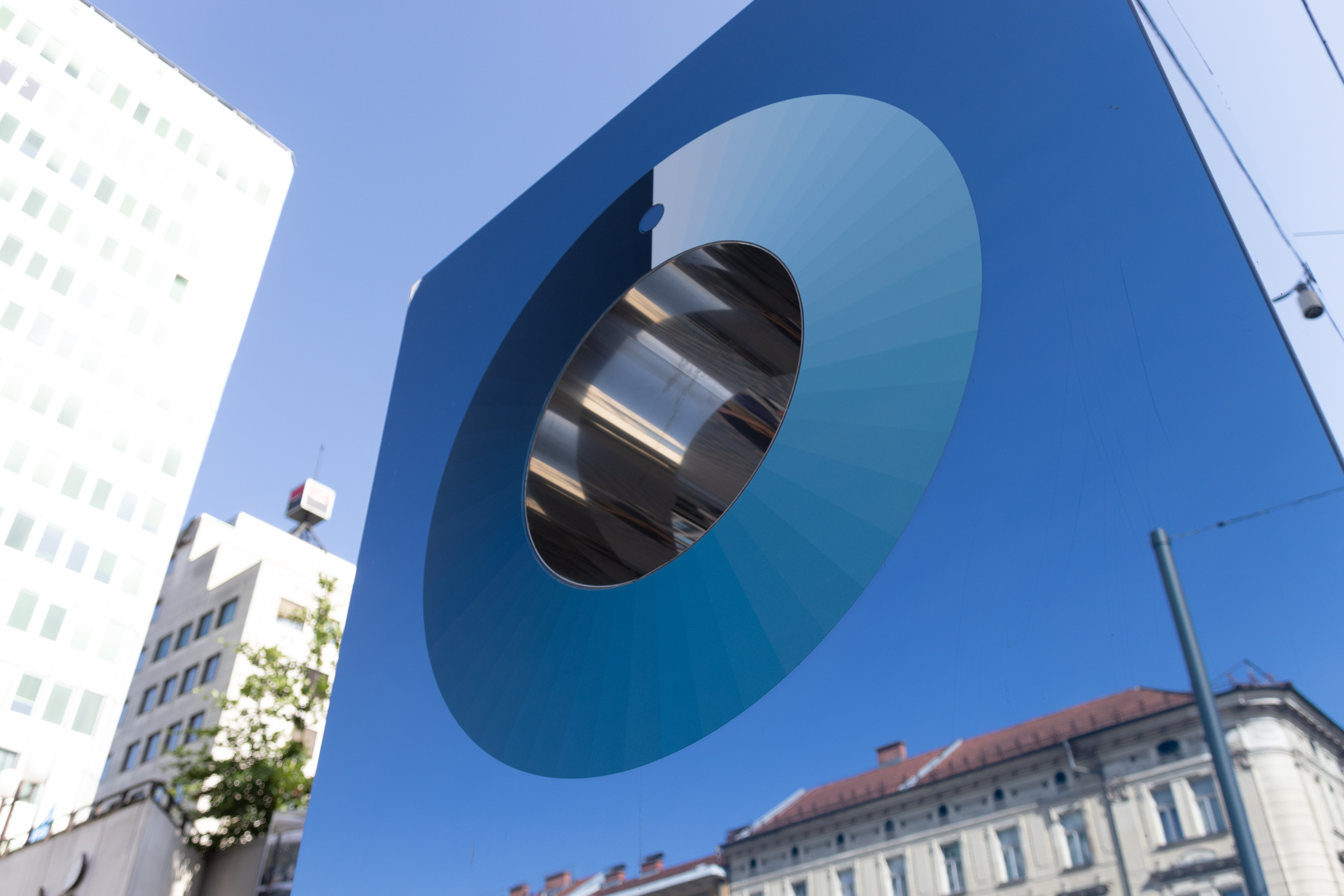
An artwork in Ljubljana, Slovenia, inspired by a cyanometer

A cyanometer (from cyan and -meter) is an instrument for measuring "blueness", specifically the colour intensity of blue sky. It is attributed to Horace-Bénédict de Saussure and Alexander von Humboldt. It consists of squares of paper dyed in graduated shades of blue and arranged in a color circle or square that can be held up and compared to the color of the sky.

== History ==
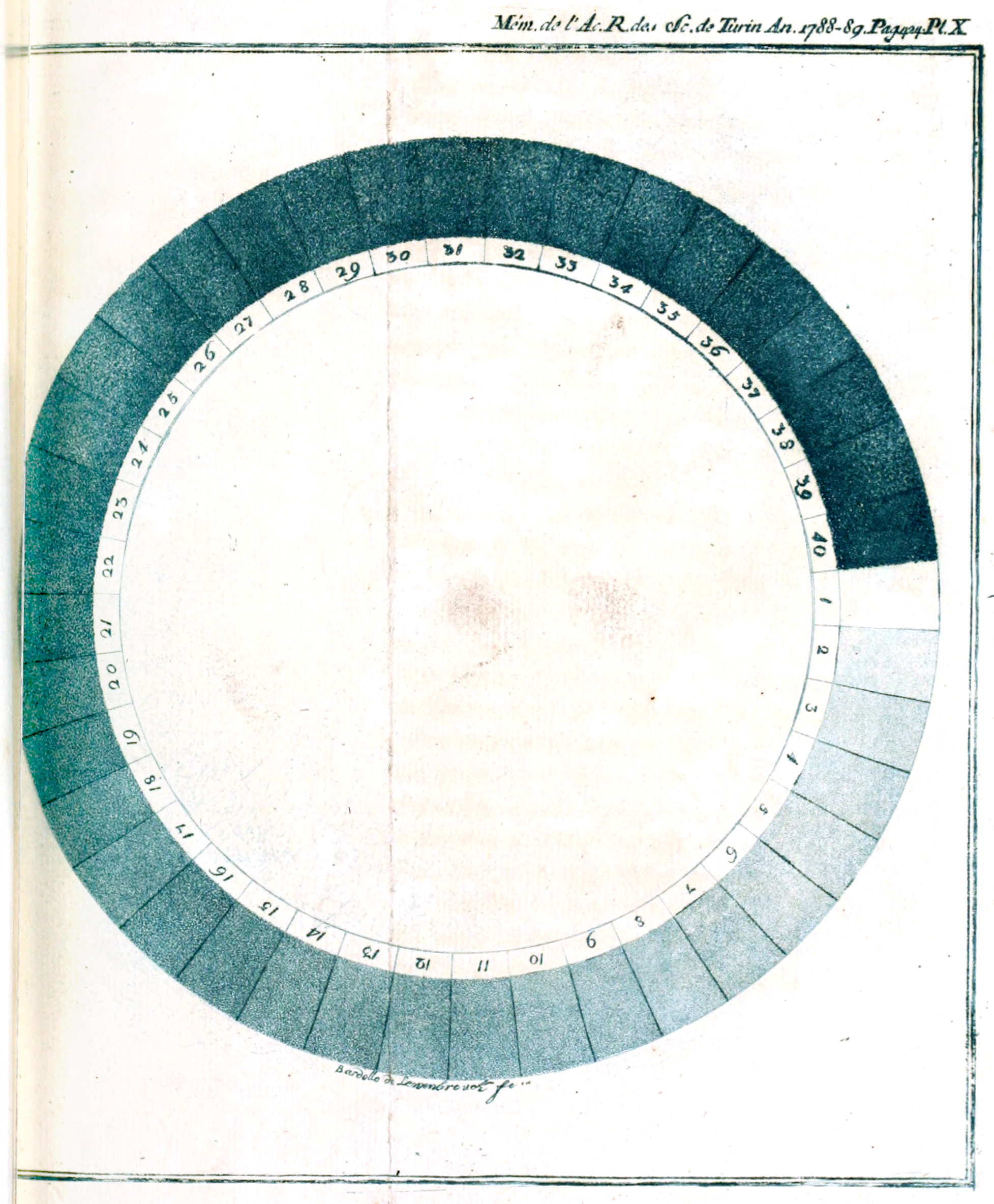
Engraving of de Saussure's cyanometer, merely for illustrative purposes, published in the Memoires de l'Academie Royale des Sciences (1790)

Horace-Bénédict de Saussure, a Swiss physicist and mountain climber, is credited with inventing the cyanometer in the 1760s. De Saussure's cyanometer was divided into colored, numbered sections, ranging from white to gradually darker shades of blue, dyed with Prussian blue and arranged in a circle. The cyanometers were manually produced with a predefined recipe of watercolor concentration for each section, and then distributed to friends and fellow naturalists to gather more observations. In an article from 1790, de Saussure presents an illustration of a wheel with 40 stops, though clarifies that it serves merely to give the reader "an idea of its form"; the actual cyanometer had 53 stops (or "degrees"), starting with white as 0 and black as 52.

De Saussure believed that the color of the sky was dependent on the amount of particles suspended in the atmosphere, (Note: "[...] la couleur du Ciel peut être considérée comme la mesure de la quantité des vapeurs opaques ou des exhalaisons qui sont suspendues dans l'air." ["(...) the colour of the Sky may be considered as a measure of the quantity of opaque vapours or exhalations suspended in the air."]) and that these particles had an opaque color blue (thought to be 34 degrees on the scale). If this were true, then one could estimate the concentration of such particles using the cyanometer.

The tool was meant to be used outside, by holding it up to the sky and finding the closest color to the sky's. Additionally, in an attempt to standardize testing, de Saussure gives a few pointers on how observations should be made. For example:

[...] si on faisoit son observation à la fenêtre ou sur le seuil d'une porte, ces couleurs ne seroient éclairées que par la lumière qui viendroit de l'intérieur de la maison & ainsi elles paroîtroient plus obscures qu'en rase campagne où elles sont éclairées par une grande partie du Ciel.

[(...) if one were to make an observation at the window or at a door, the colors would only be illuminated by the light coming from inside the house, and thus they would appear darker than in the open countryside where they are illuminated by a large part of the Sky.]

— De Saussure (1790)

De Saussure used the device to measure the color of the sky at Geneva, Chamonix, and Mont Blanc (Col du Géant):

Color of the Sky at zenith at different hours
Hours	4 am	6 am	8 am	10 am	Noon	2 pm	4 pm	6 pm	8 pm	Mean
Col du Géant	15.6	27.0	29.2	31.0	31.0	30.6	24.0	18.7	5.5	23.6
Chamonix	14.7	15.1	17.2	18.1	18.9	19.9	19.9	19.8	16.4	17.8
Geneva	—N/a	14.7	21.0	22.6	22.5	20.6	20.4	16.3	—N/a	19.7

Color of the Sky at the horizon at different hours
Hours	4 am	6 am	8 am	10 am	Noon	2 pm	4 pm	6 pm	8 pm	Mean
Col du Géant	4.7	7.5	8.4	9.7	11.5	7.6	5.5	4.7	0.0	6.6
Chamonix	5.5	7.0	8.3	8.6	9.1	9.3	8.8	8.4	5.0	7.8

Alexander von Humboldt (1769–1859) was an eager user of the cyanometer on his voyages and explorations: during his trip across the Atlantic Ocean, he observed 23.5 degrees at noon; at the summit of Teide, a record 41 degrees; and, while climbing to the summit of Chimborazo, on 23 June 1802, Humboldt broke both the record of highest altitude ever reached by humans, but also of observed darkness of the sky, with 46 degrees on the cyanometer.

In his satirical verse epic Don Juan (Canto IV, 112), Lord Byron alludes to this device as an ironical means of measuring the blue of bluestocking ladies, crediting Humboldt for its invention. (Note: Oh! "darkly, deeply, beautifully blue," As some one somewhere sings about the sky, And I, ye learned ladies, say of you; They say your stockings are so (Heaven knows why, I have examined few pair of that hue); Blue as the garters which serely lie Round the Patrician left-legs, which adorn The festal midnight, and the levee morn. [...] Humboldt, "the first of travellers," but not The last, if late accounts be accurate, Invented, by some name I have forgot, As well as the sublime discovery's date, An airy instrument, with which he sought To ascertain the atmospheric state, By measuring "the intensity of blue:" Oh, Lady Daphne! let me measure you! — Lord Byron, Don Juan (1821), Canto IV §§ 110, 112; p.127)

== Theory ==
The blueness of clear air in Earth's atmosphere is due to Rayleigh scattering by nitrogen and oxygen molecules. Dry air is 78% nitrogen and 21% oxygen. Atmospheric water content ranges from 0% to 5%.

When looking through clear air toward the horizon, distant sunlight of all wavelengths (colors) will generally undergo Mie scattering from spherical suspended particles. In an unpolluted sky, these spherical particles will primarily be liquid water condensed onto natural atmospheric dust grains. This is known as "wet haze". Therefore, in an unpolluted clear sky, wet haze adds white sunlight to blue Rayleigh-scattered light. More wet haze in the observer's line of sight results in a brighter and paler blue sky color.

When looking toward the horizon, an observer looks through up to 40 times as much atmosphere compared to looking overhead. Therefore, more Mie scattering is seen when viewing parts of the sky closer to the horizon. A darker blue sky will be observed if less wet haze is in the observer's line of sight. This occurs when looking directly overhead and at a higher altitude.

== See also ==
- Diffuse sky radiation

== Bibliography ==
- Heubner (1840). "Über das Cyanometer". Zeitschrift für Physik und verwandte Wissenschaften. 6: 201.
- Hermann von Schlagintweit, Adolf Schlagintweit (1850). Untersuchungen über die physicalische Geographie der Alpen in ihren Beziehungen zu den Phaenomenen der Gletscher, zur Geologie, Meteorologie und PflanzengeographieBarth. p. 441.
