= Woodroffe-Hedley v Cuthbertson =

English tort law case

Woodroffe-Hedley v Cuthbertson, also known as Hedley v Cuthbertson (Unreported, 20 June 1997) was an English tort law case heard in the Queen's Bench Division of the High Court. The claimant was a six-year-old child whose father had died in a mountaineering accident; the defendant was the victim's mountain guide who was found guilty of negligence.

== Facts ==
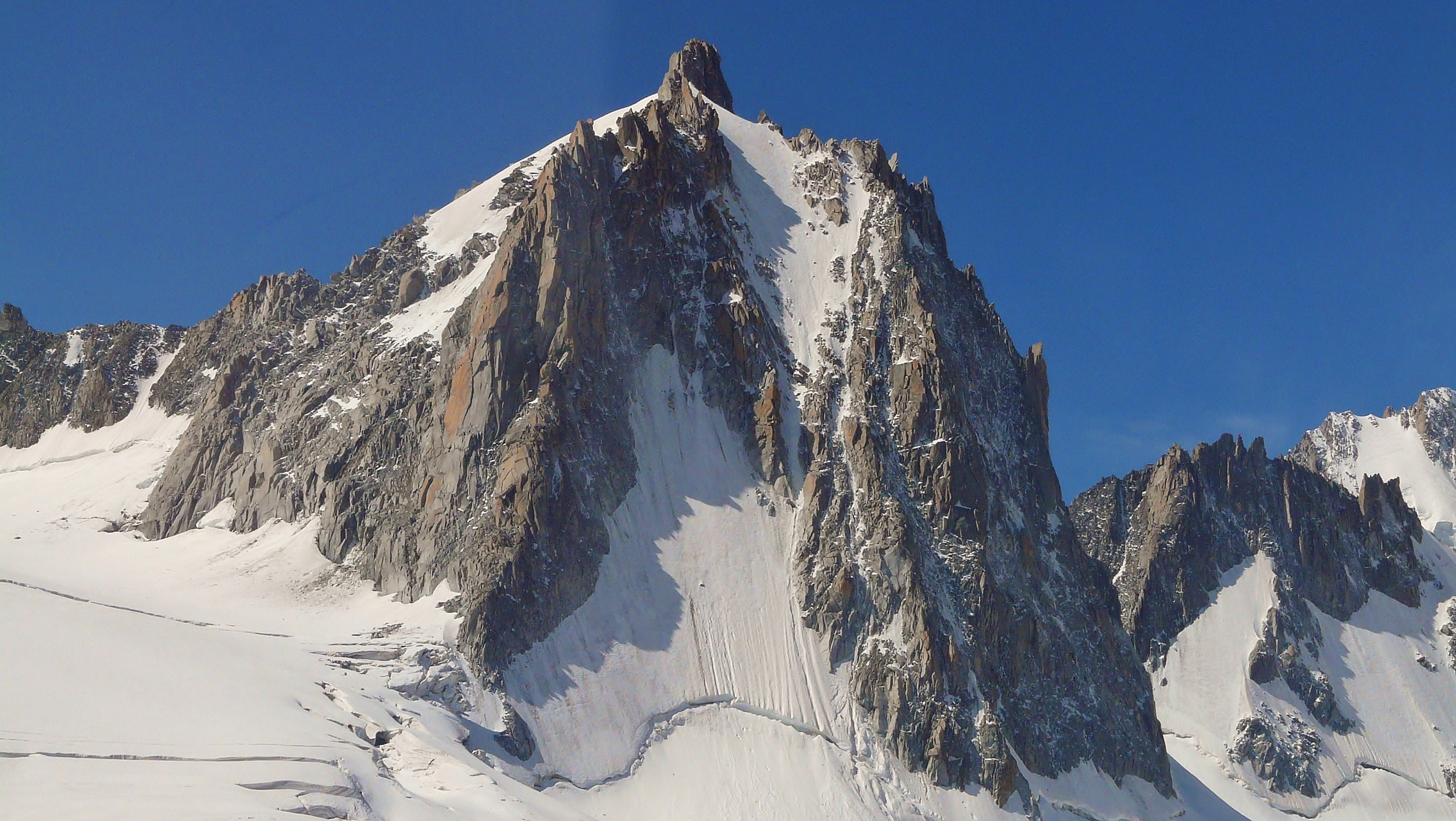
Tour Ronde – North face, showing lower and upper icefields

Gerry Hedley hired David Cuthbertson to guide him to the summit of the Tour Ronde in the French Alps via its steep North face. Hedley was an experienced climber and Cuthbertson was an experienced Alpine guide. Cuthbertson was leading and was concerned about the sun's effect on the snow. He therefore used a single screw belay to save time. Cuthbertson could not remember the accident, but another climber stated that a large sheet of ice broke away from the mountain, wrenching out the screw and killing Hedley instantly. Cuthbertson's knee was fractured in the accident.

== Judgment ==
The victim's six-year-old son, who had not been born at the time of his father's death, was the claimant.

Mr Justice Dyson held that the defendant had been negligent in only using one screw and had fallen below the standard of care owed to the victim. He described the situation as a "serious mistake with tragic consequences." He awarded £150,000 in damages, although he was also critical of the risks that the victim had taken. The damages were paid by the defendant's insurance company.

== Later developments ==
Cuthbertson was the first mountain climber to be sued for negligence following a fatal accident. Hedley's widow expressed sympathy for Cuthberson.

Cuthbertson's actions in the accident were later defended by the professional standards committee of the British Mountain Guides Association, who found he was not at fault.

The case is often used as an example in tort law textbooks, as well as in general sports education.

== Bibliography ==
- Horsley, Kirsty; Rackley, Erika (2013). Tort Law (3rd ed.). Oxford: Oxford University Press. ISBN 978-0199661893.
