= Vallée Blanche Cable Car =

Passenger cable car

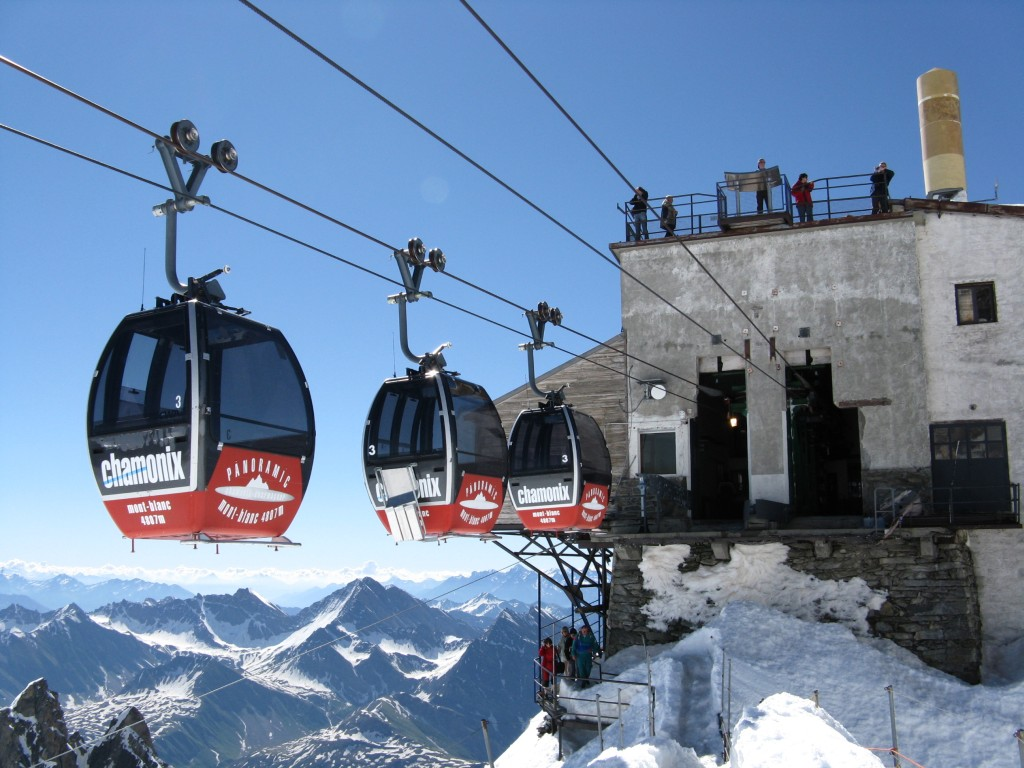
- View at Punta Helbronner from the side of France
- Interactive map of Vallée Blanche Cable Car

Overview
- Status: Operational
- Character: Aerial tramway
- Location: Alps
- No. of stations: 3
- Construction begin: 1954
- Open: 1958
- Website: http://www.compagniedumontblanc.fr/#

Operation
- Operator: Compagnie du Mont-Blanc S.A

The Vallée Blanche Cable Car (Italian: Funivia dei Ghiacciai; French: Télécabine Panoramic Mont-Blanc, previously Télécabine de la Vallée Blanche) is a passenger cable car linking a mountain peak above Courmayeur (Italy) to a peak above Chamonix (France) by passing over the Mont Blanc massif, in the Alps. The engineering was developed by Vittorio Zignoli of Polytechnic University of Turin. No helicopters were used, and all the workers were chosen among locals and alpine guides. After a construction period of four years, it began service in 1958.

The cable car connects the peaks of Aiguille du Midi (3,778 m (12,395 ft) elevation) and Pointe Helbronner (3,466 m (11,371 ft) elevation), over a distance of some 5 km (3.1 mi). The two peaks have their own cable car system connecting them to their nearby villages. The French Téléphérique de l'Aiguille du Midi connects the peak of Aiguille du Midi to the village of Chamonix, while the Italian Skyway Monte Bianco (Funivie Monte Bianco) connects the peak of Pointe Helbronner to the village of La Palud, just north of Courmayeur.

This tourist attraction spans the valleys between the two peaks, high above the Mont Blanc Tunnel, which carries automotive passenger and freight traffic under the two peaks.

== System ==
The Vallée Blanche Cable Car has fixed track cables (one each direction) carrying 12 groups of 3 small cabins each which are pulled by a haulage rope of 10,200 m (33,500 ft) in a single loop.

The cabins take some 30 to 35 minutes for the whole distance, including 5 short stops corresponding the stops of the cabins arriving in the stations at either end.

The cabins run from the Aiguille du Midi station (3,778 m (12,395 ft) elevation) across a span of 1,684 m (5,525 ft) over Vallée Blanche, a glacier and snow valley, to the Gros Rognon station (3,536 m (11,601 ft)). The Gros Rognon station is not a passenger station—it contains the counterweights of the fixed cables and the rails bending the horizontal direction of the cables by some 8° to the right.

Beyond the Gros Rognon, the cabins cross the Géant Glacier and snow valley, a span of 2,831 m (9,288 ft) between supports. Although the cables sag by some 255 m (837 ft), the cabins still have a clearance of some 300 m (980 ft) to the glacier underneath.

Between the rocks of the Large and the Small Flambeau, three 315 m (1,033 ft) long steel cables are installed, which take over the role of the cable support (Pylône suspendu / Suspended Support Pillar). During construction, it was decided to build this unique configuration, because the glacier is unsuitable for high tower construction. Between the anchors of these cables at either side, there is a difference in elevation of 136 m (446 ft), resulting in these cables having a horizontal inclination of some 23° to the direction of the tramway.

From this support the cable car runs 447 m (1,467 ft) to Pointe Helbronner (3,466 m (11,371 ft) elevation).

== Coordinates ==
- Aiguille du Midi: 45°52′41.49″N 6°53′13.73″E
- Gros Rognon Angle Station: 45°52′06.4″N 6°54′15.33″E
- Hanging Support Structure: 45°50′57.14″N 6°55′39.86″E
- Pointe Helbronner: 45°50′46.68″N 6°55′53.61″E

== Incidents ==
On 29 August 1961, the cable car was badly damaged when a Republic F-84F Thunderstreak of the French Armée de l'Air tore its hauling cable. Three cars crashed and six people were killed. Pilot Bernard Ziegler landed his damaged plane safely. The upward cable was undamaged, but 81 riders had to wait many hours for rescue.

On September 8, 2016, 110 people were stranded when the cable cars stopped. They needed to be evacuated by helicopter.
