= Géant Glacier =

Glacier on the French side of the Mont Blanc massif

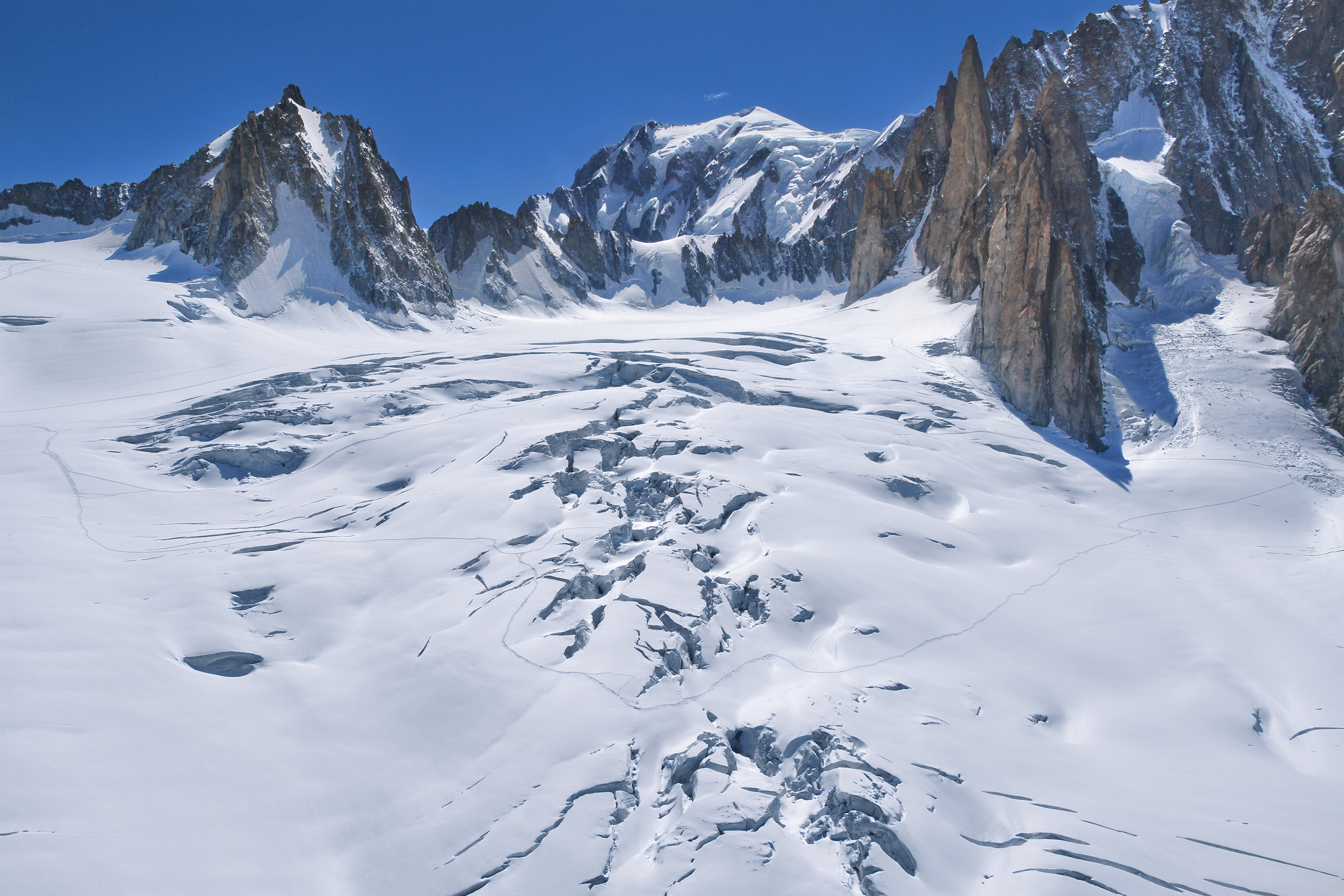
- View looking over the Géant Glacier. The tracks of climbers wend their way between enormous crevasses. Mont Blanc (centre), Tour Ronde (left). July 2010

- Location within Alps
- Location: Auvergne-Rhône-Alpes, France
- Coordinates: 45°51′30″N 06°55′00″E

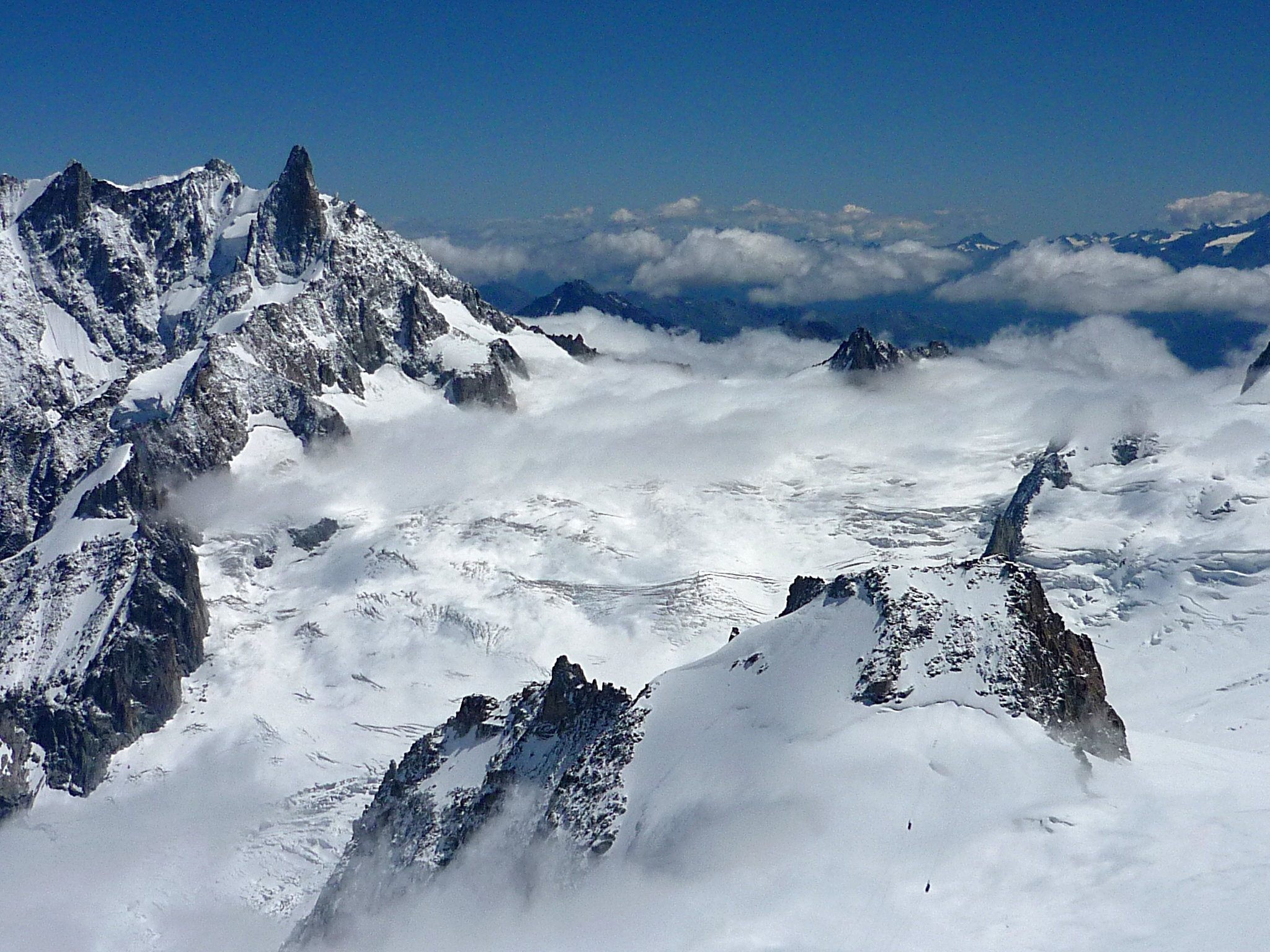
Géant Glacier, Gros Rognon, Dent du Géant and Aiguilles Marbrées seen from Aiguille du Midi, France.

The Géant Glacier (French: Glacier du Géant) is a large glacier on the French side of the Mont Blanc massif in the Alps. It is the main supplier of ice (via the Vallée Blanche) to the Mer de Glace which flows down towards Montenvers. It gets its name from the nearby Dent du Géant.

== Access ==
It is possible to take the Vallée Blanche Cable Car which travels right over the Géant Glacier, from the Aiguille du Midi in France, to Pointe Helbronner on the Italian/French border. Experienced skiers also have an "outstanding attraction" in the challenging run from the Aiguille du Midi telepherique station, down the Vallée Blanche and onto the Géant Glacier then, avoiding the Seracs du Géant, merging onto the Mer de Glace to reach the resort of Montenvers

== Early studies ==
In 1862, the physicist and mountaineer John Tyndall gave a series of lectures to the Royal Institution in which he reported on his studies into heat as a form of motion. By placing lines of stakes upon the ice, he made numerous measurements of ice flow from the Géant Glacier and surrounding glaciers into the Mer de Glace. He subsequently published further accounts in his 'Glaciers of the Alps.

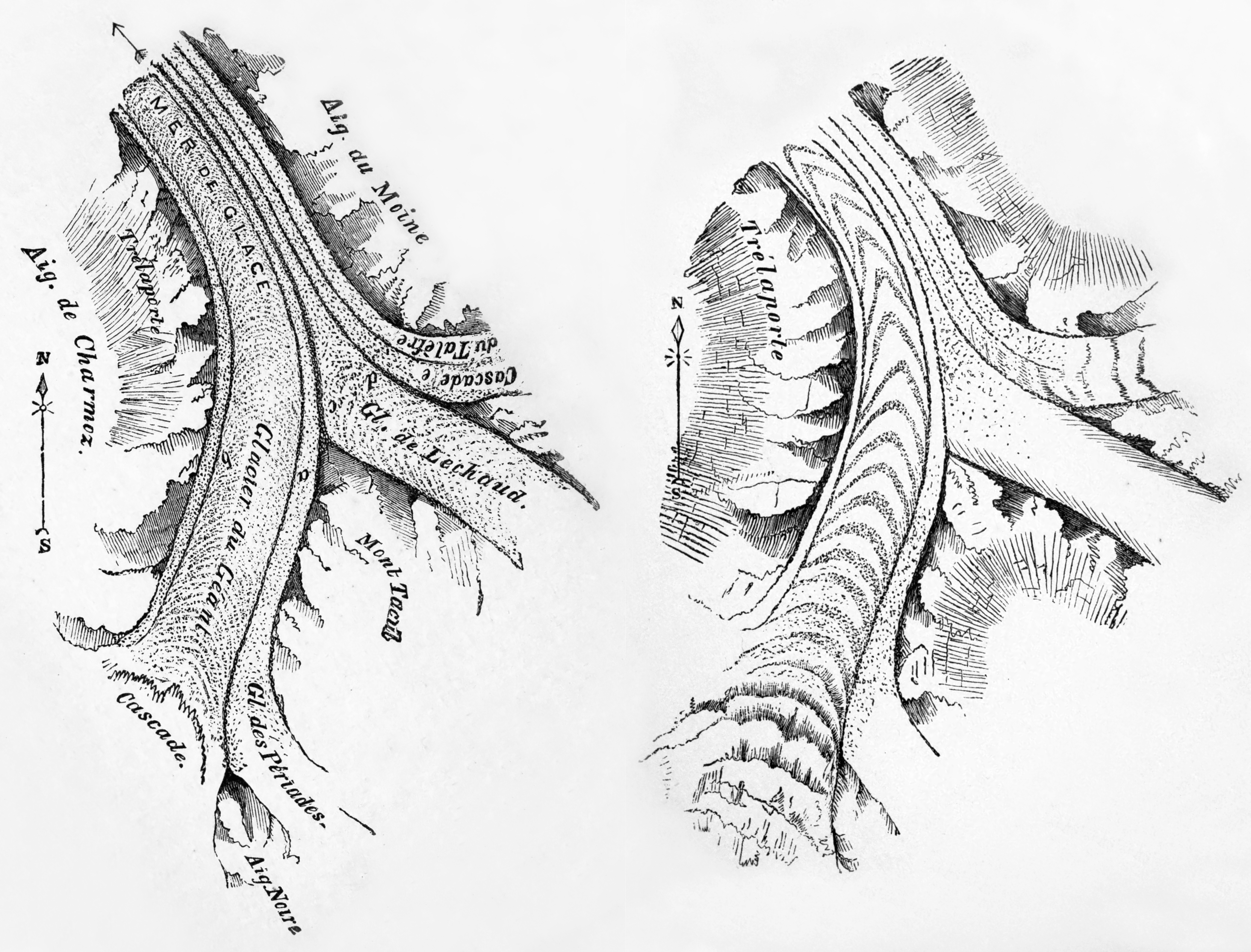
1857 sketchmap by John Tyndall, showing the Geant and other glaciers merging into the Mer de Glace
