= Tour Ronde =

Mountain in the Mont Blanc massif

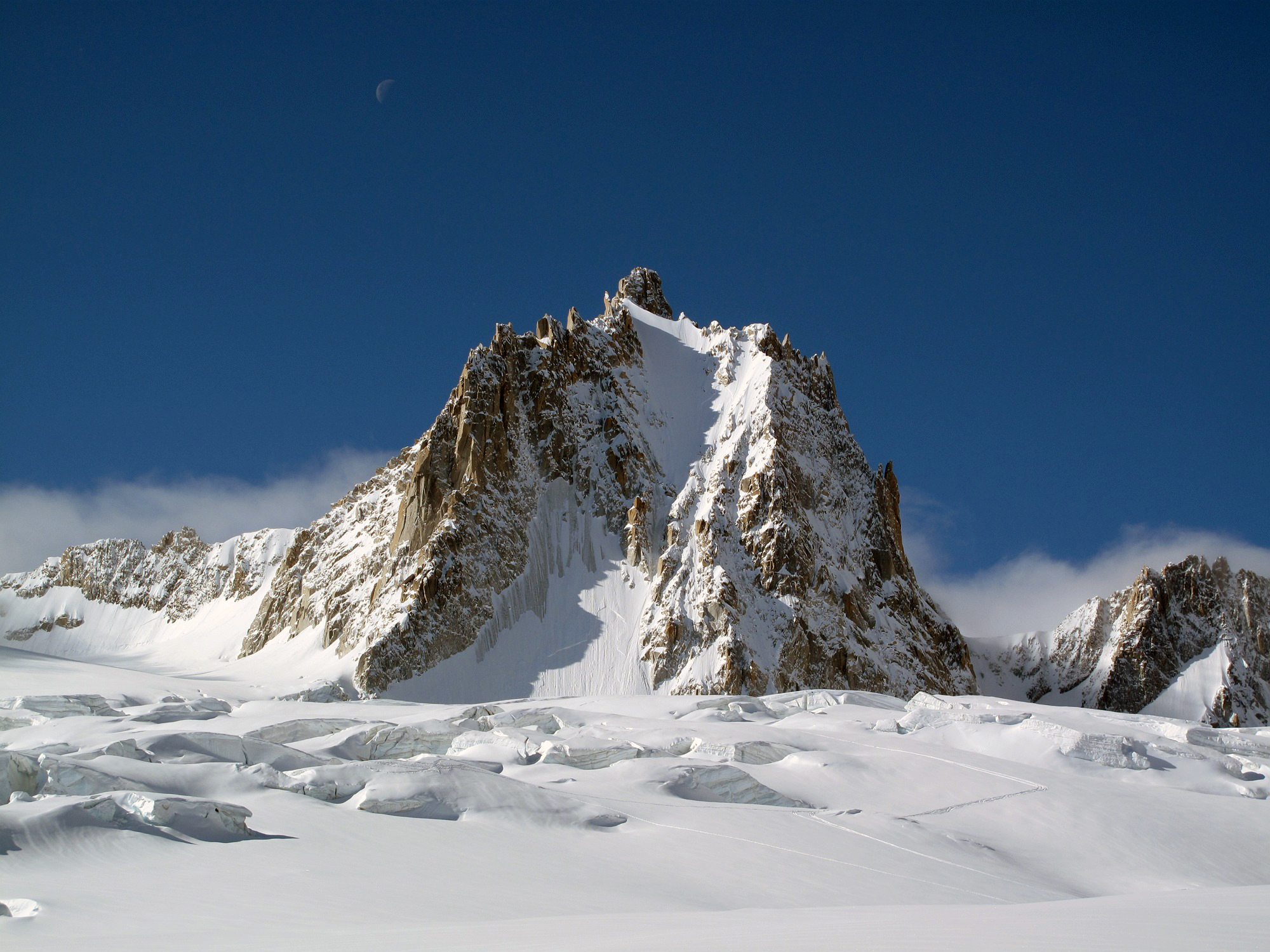
- Tour Ronde and the Géant Glacier

Highest point
- Elevation: 3,792 m (12,441 ft)
- Prominence: 165 m (541 ft)
- Coordinates: 45°50′43″N 6°54′23″E

Geography
- Location within Alps
- Parent range: Mont Blanc massif

Climbing
- First ascent: J.H. Blackhouse, T.H. Carson, Douglas William Freshfield, C.C. Tucker, Daniel Balleys & Michel Payot, 22 July 1867
- Easiest route: South-east Ridge (PD)

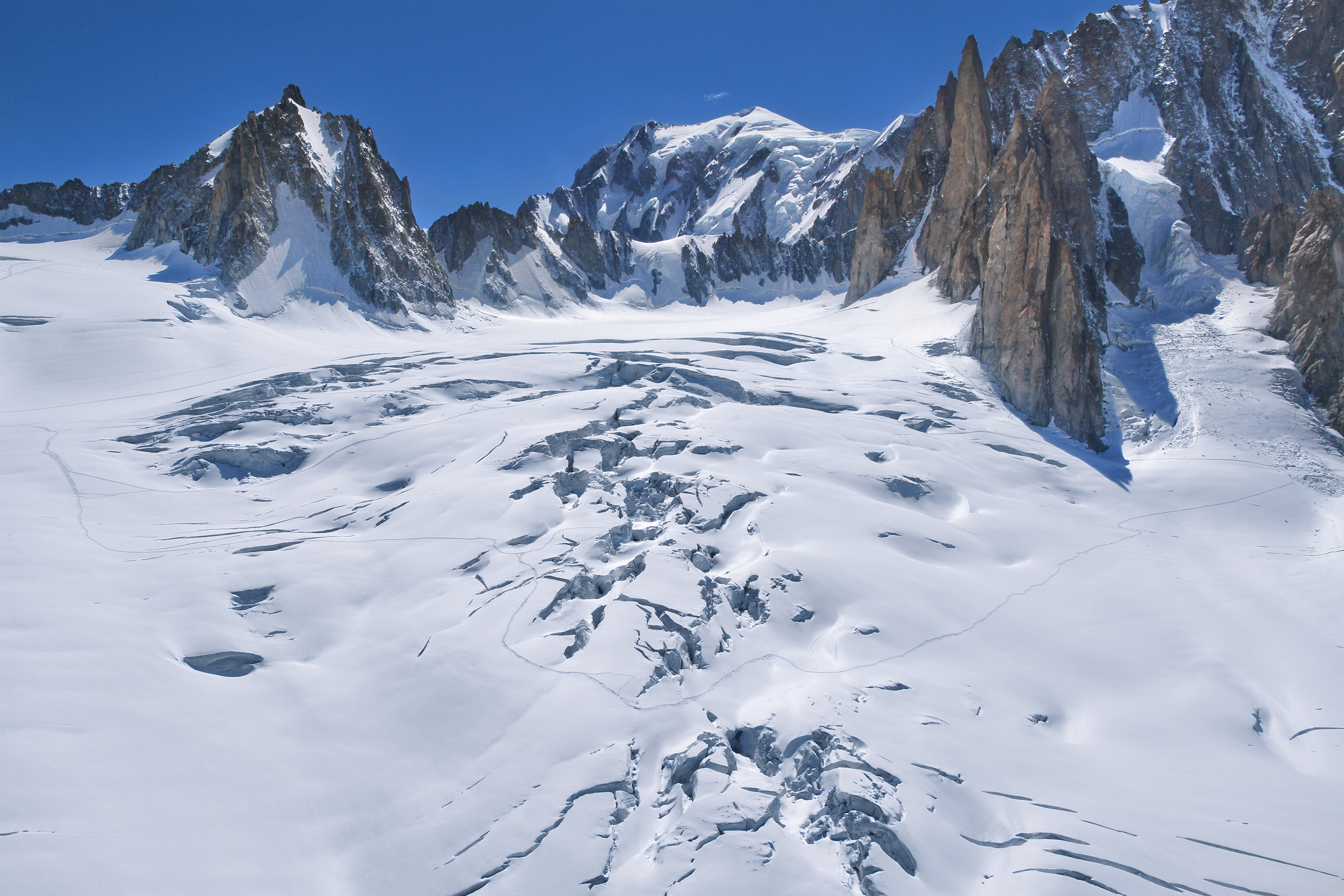
View across crevasse field of the Géant Glacier, looking towards the Tour Ronde and Mont Blanc, July 2010

The Tour Ronde (3,792 metres (12,441 ft)) is a mountain in the Mont Blanc massif of the Alps, situated on the border between France and Italy. It is a prominent mountain, some 3.5 km north-east of Mont Blanc, but is effectively part of a continuation of the south eastern spur of Mont Maudit (l'Arete de la Brenva) which forms a frontier ridge between the two countries. It is easily accessible to mountaineers and provides not only a very good viewpoint from its summit of the Brenva face and the major peaks on the southern side of Mont Blanc, but it also offers a popular introduction to alpine climbing of all grades, including a north face ascent.

== First Ascents ==
- First ascent by J.Backhouse, T. Carson, Douglas Freshfield and C. Tucker with Daniel Balleys and Michel Payot, 22 July 1867.
- First ascent of the North face was by F. Gonella and A. Berthod on 23 August 1886.
- First winter ascent: U. Mautino with J. Petigax and C. Croux, c.1895

== Viewpoint ==
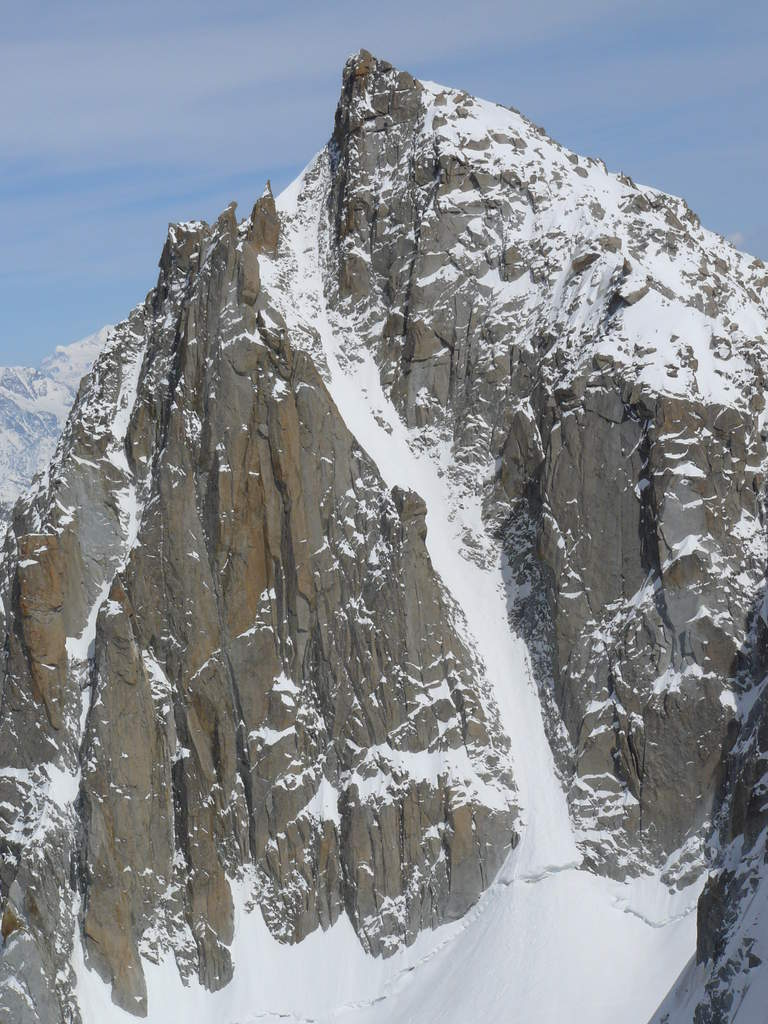
Tour Ronde – Couloir Gervasutti

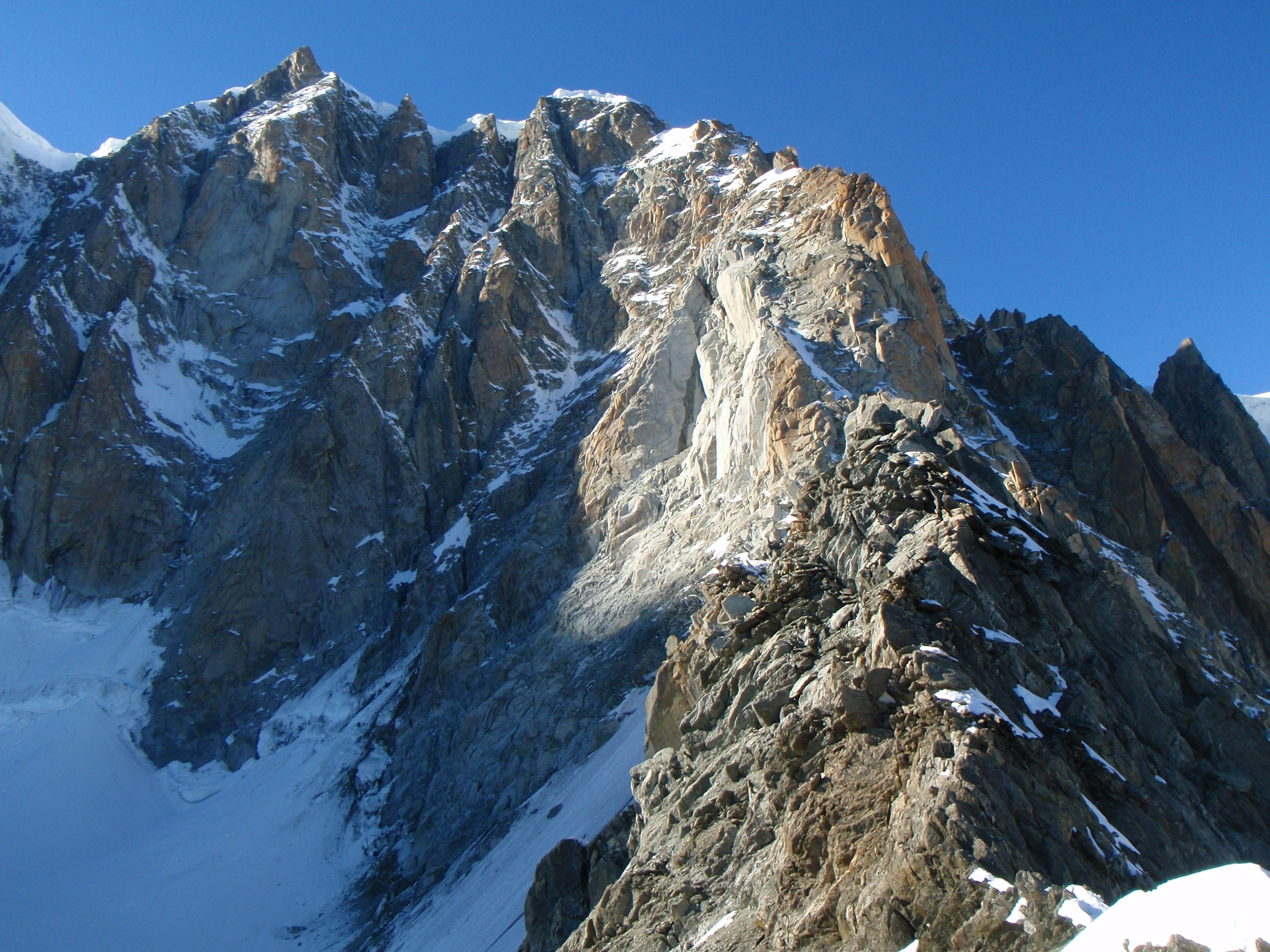
View along L'Arete de la Brenva (Kufner Ridge) towards Mont Maudit from Bivouac de la Fourche

The relatively isolated but easily accessible summit of the Tour Ronde has a reputation for providing mountaineers with one of the finest viewpoints within the Mont Blanc range, and offers an ideal place for observing the sun rising on Mont Blanc itself. To the north it offers extensive views over the wide and heavily crevassed Géant Glacier (French: Glacier du Géant) and the Vallée Blanche towards the Aiguille du Midi, whilst looking westwards it provides very extensive views towards Mont Maudit and the full sweep of the Brenva Face of Mont Blanc and the Peuterey Ridge.

Writing about the first ascensionist's impression of the view from the summit of the Tour Ronde, one author quoted Douglas Freshfield in volume 6 of The Alpine Journal (1874), thus:

He wrote of this at the time that no other view had left upon his mind "a recollection of such overpowering magnificence".

— Douglas Freshfield, quoted by T. Graham Brown in 1939

== Access ==
The Tour Ronde can be most easily reached within about 1.5 hours from the Torino Hut near Pointe Helbronner, where mountaineers spend the night before leaving, usually well before dawn, to ascend the summit early the next day. Alternate and longer routes can be made from the Refuge des Cosmiques at the Col du Midi via a passage across the head of the Vallee Blanche and the Géant Glacier (or from Chamonix via the Aiguille du Midi and the Vallée Blanche Aerial Tramway). Pointe Helbronner can also be reached from the Italian side on foot or via cablecar from Courmayeur. Other even longer start or finish points include the Requin Hut above Montenvers, reached by a long but impressive glacier trek.

== Routes ==
The mountain provides many routes of ascent, and of varying difficulty and danger, as well as opportunities for possible new routes of mixed climbing. Classic mountaineering routes on the Tour Ronde include:

- South-east Ridge: One of two normal (i.e. easy) routes of ascent from the Torino Hut, offering a good introduction to alpine mountaineering at an easy grade of PD to PD+.
- East Face: Very popular route of ascent, especially when snow conditions are good earlier in the season. PD to PD+
- North Face: A well-established and classic route, very popular amongst mountaineers as a good introduction to alpine north-face climbing. Graded at AD+ to D-, dependent upon conditions, the route has an average angle of around 52° and the summit takes around 4 hours or more to reach from the Torino Hut. The route's difficulties are being mainly in overcoming the initial bergschrund and the moving from the lower to the upper ice field. By keeping to the right hand side of the slope climbers are able to utilise rock belays for much of the climb. Dangers involve rock and ice fall, and an early start is necessary to ensure good snow conditions as the face does get exposed to the sun later in the day.
- North Couloir: An alternate and steeper route with an angle around 60° which is sometimes used by competent parties when the more popular North face is overcrowded.
- Gervasutti Couloir: A popular, classic snow-ice couloir at an angle of just less than 50°. When in good condition, this route, graded at AD, does get used in descent, both by climbers and by skiers. First climbed by G. Gervasutti and R.Chabod on 27 July 1934. (pictured)
- Couloir Rebuffat. Narrow ice-couloir, D+
- North-east Ridge Direct.

Other new mixed climbing ascents routes have also been achieved in recent years although, because of the mountain's popularity and accessibility, it can be difficult to determine whether the routes are actually new or not.

== Events and incidents ==
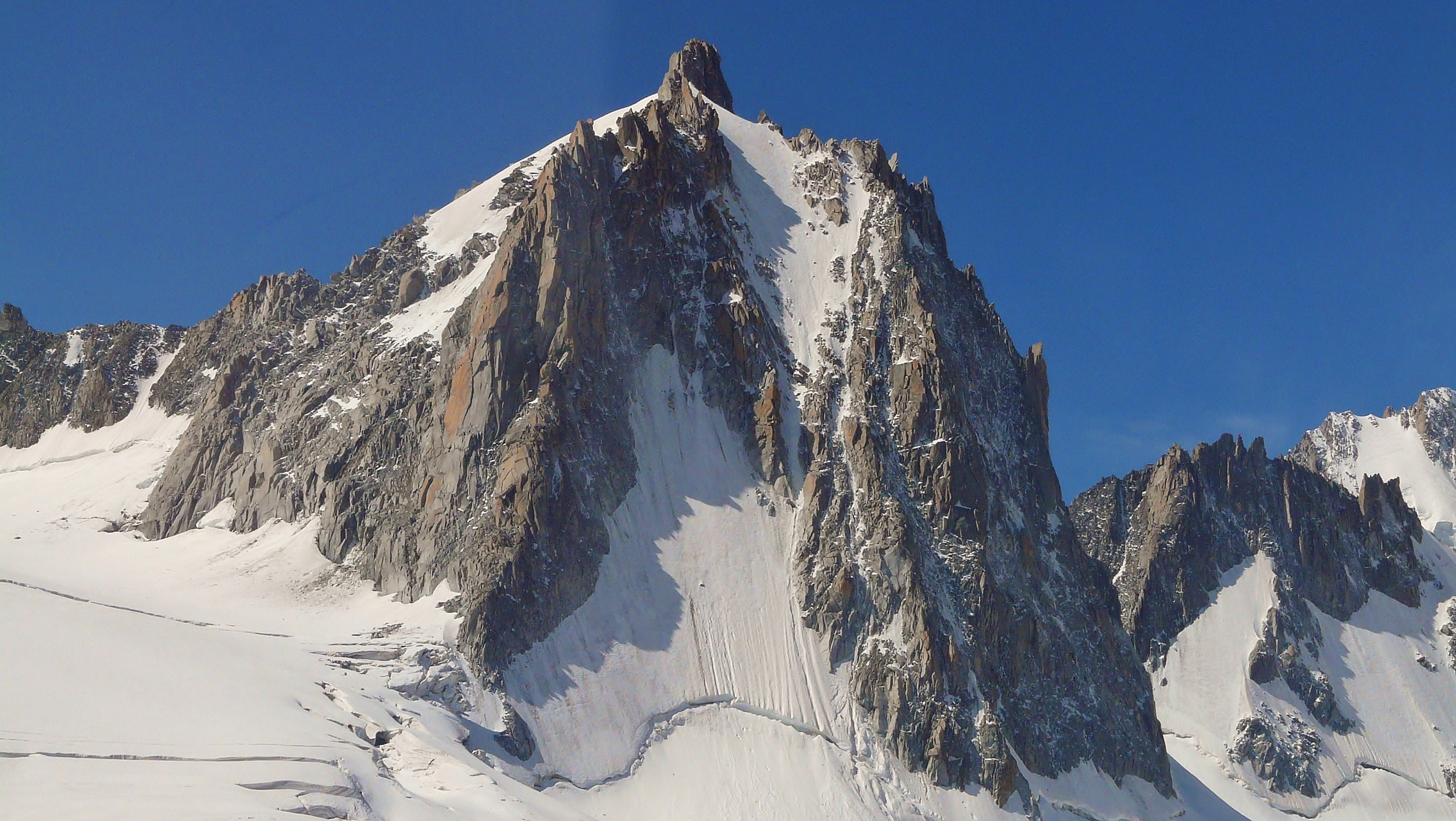
Tour Ronde – North face, showing lower and upper icefields

- 1971 July 20. First descent on skis of North Face, by Patrick Vallençant.
- 1979 July 18. Accident occurred killing 8 climbers and injuring 4. Amongst the dead were four climbers from The RAE climbing club in Farnborough, Hampshire, including John A Williams and Chris Hassell. Christopher Marsh, who slipped and fell whilst the climbers were descending, was initially put on trial for causing the accident. However, all charges were subsequently dropped by the Annecy courts.
- 1997 The six-year-old son of a British climber, Gerry Hedley, successfully sued a mountain guide, David Cuthbertson, for negligence after a fatal accident that took place seven years previously in July 1990 during an ascent of the north face. He was awarded £150,000 of damages by the High Court after the judge concluded that use of a single ice screw during the roped ascent had not been sufficient to protect the client when the guide fell when a slab of snow or ice broke away beneath him, pulling them both down the face. The guide was injured and the client was killed in the fall. The guide's professional association later vindicated Cuthbertson; this case is often used as an example and discussed in detail in legal textbooks dealing with tort law and sports education.
- 2009 May 29. Olympic Champion snowboarder and aspirant mountain guide Karine Ruby was killed at age 31 whilst leading a descent of the Tour Ronde. Ruby fell into a 70-foot-wide crevasse (21 m) in the Géant Glacier, dragging in two other members of the roped climbing party, one of whom was killed and the other sustained serious injuries and was evacuated by helicopter.
- 2015 January. A British skier died in a fall after losing a ski during a descent of the North Face.
- 2018 June 3. A well-known French plastic surgeon, Dr Armelle Chichery, was killed at age 42 during the ascent of the North Face.

== Climate change, permafrost and rockfall ==
In 2005 the Tour Ronde became the first high mountain ever to be subject to extremely detailed laser-scanning and monitoring. Amid growing concern in recent decades that climate change had been increasing the incidence of severe rock-fall and loss of permafrost at high altitude, a study was launched to monitor potentially unstable rock faces and to assess changes over time. Previous techniques had used aerial photography and digital elevation modelling (DEM), but were deemed not to be sufficiently accurate to monitor change because of the vertical viewpoint and shadowing effects, plus the general coarse nature of their results.

By 2005 the newly-evolving technique of Light Detection and Ranging, known as LiDAR, permitted highly detailed laser scanning of high mountain rock faces, measuring many thousands of separate points every second, and from a distance of up to 800 metres. An EU Interreg–funded project was established to undertake research. Known as PERMAdataROC, its aims were to "improve our understanding of the relationship between permafrost degradation and slope instabilities by quantifying the occurrence and magnitude of rock falls from high-mountain rock walls". Seven sites in the Mont Blanc Massif were selected, with the east face of the Tour Ronde being the first to be analysed. Measurements were taken in July 2005 and again in July 2006.

An area of the east face of 67,400 m^{2} was laser-scanned, creating 22 overlapping computer images, with measurements accurate to between 3 and 5 cm. Careful computer analysis revealed that in the twelve-month period between scans, the measured area had lost 536 m^{3} of rock. This is comparable to an erosion rate across the entire measured area of the face of 8.4 mm per year – a figure significantly greater than those found in rock walls of high-altitude permafrost in Switzerland and Greenland. The project concluded that the higher rock fall rate exhibited on the Tour Ronde and elsewhere in the Mont Blanc massif was linked to the degradation in permafrost which would have held the mountain together more effectively, but which now exposed it to greater weathering through the freeze-thaw cycle of water, with maximum occurrence during warm summers.

In 2015 a huge rockfall on the Tour Ronde's east face was captured on film by climbers, demonstrating that instability in this mountain area remains at a significant level.

== Mountain views and routes ==
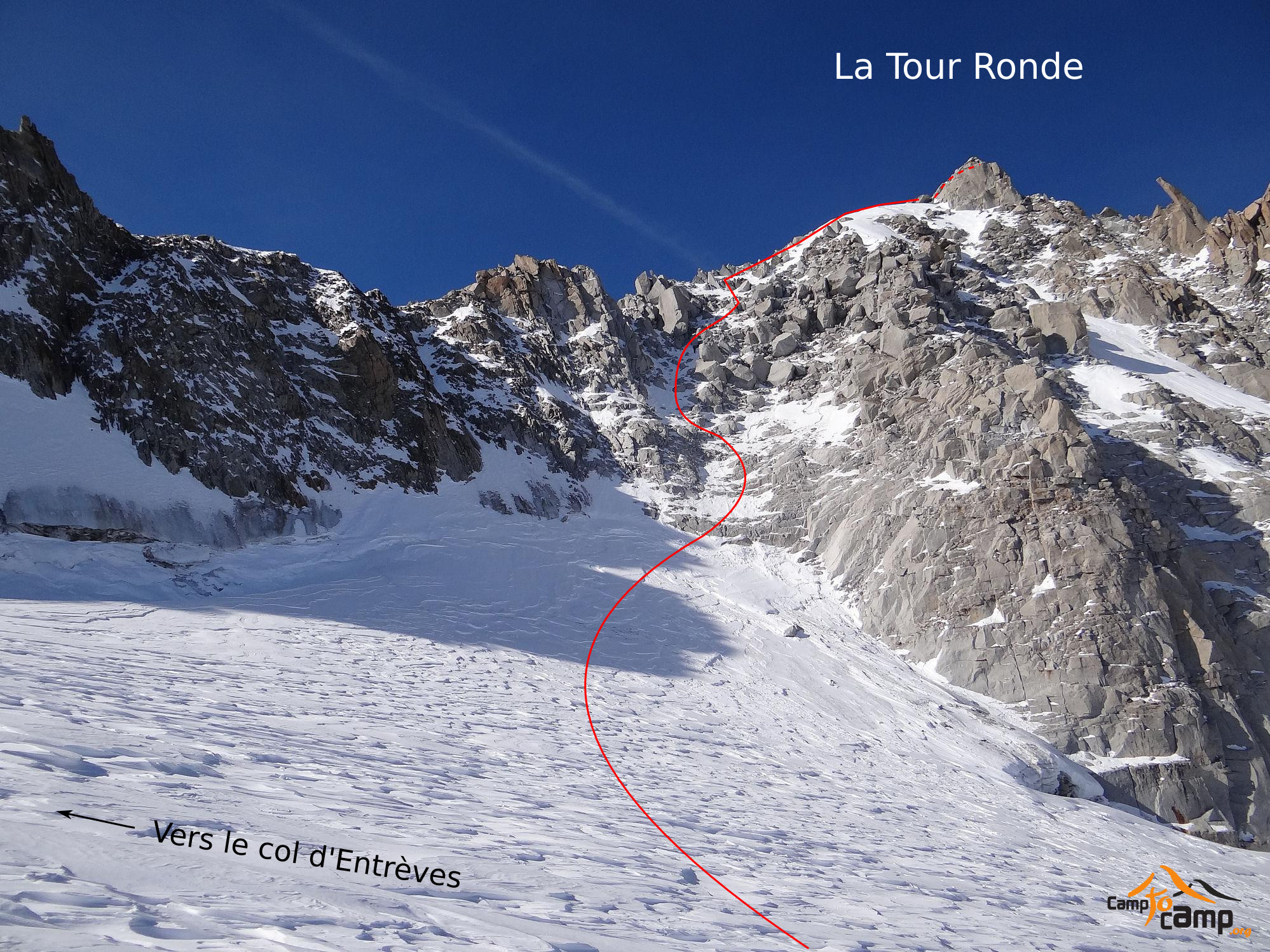
South-east ridge and east face route (PD) showing route of ascent.

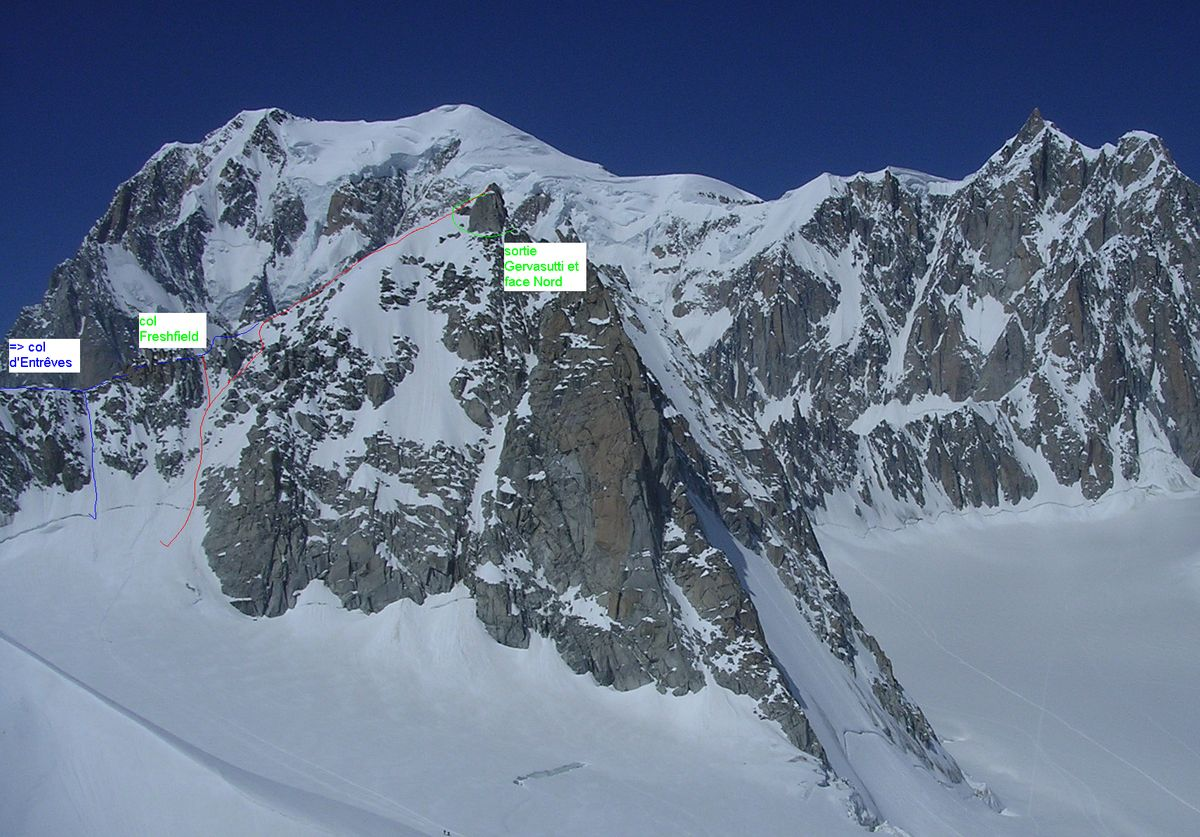
East face of the Tour Ronde, showing normal routes of ascent (red and blue), and exit route from the North face and Gervasutti Couloir routes (green). The frontier ridge of the Arete de la Brenva leading up to Mont Maudit is shown to the right, with Mont Blanc to the left. The rock face in the centre of the picture is part of the east face, used in LiDAR analysis of permafrost degradation and rockfall. In 2015 a huge rockfall on this face was captured on video.

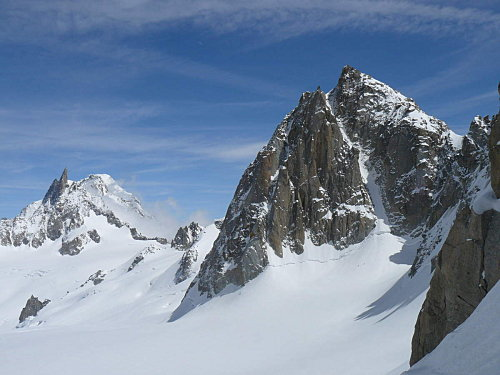
West face of Tour Ronde showing Gervasutti Couloir and the smaller Rebuffat Couloir to its left. The Dent du Géant is clearly visible in the distance.
