= Dent du Géant =

Mountain in the Mont Blanc massif

- (in Italian) Dente del Gigante
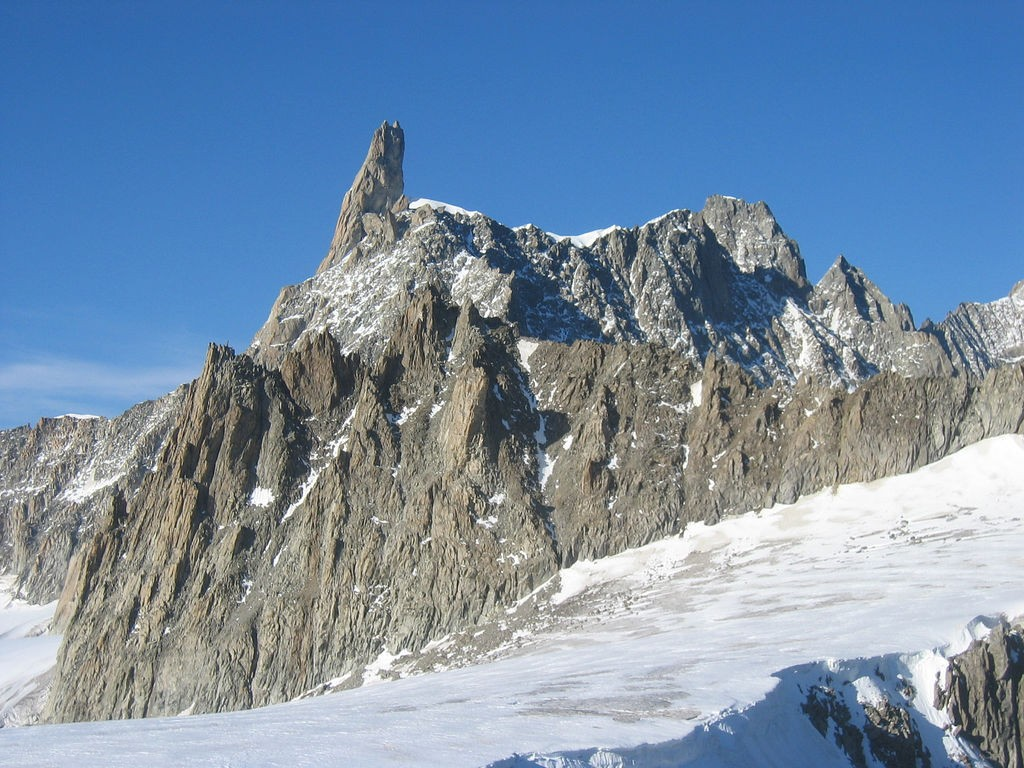
- The sharp pinnacle of the Dent du Géant (left) at the western end of the Rochefort ridge (centre)

Highest point
- Elevation: 4,013 m (13,166 ft)
- Prominence: 139 m (456 ft)
- Coordinates: 45°51′43″N 6°57′6″E

Geography
- Location within Alps
- Location: Haute-Savoie, France / Italy
- Parent range: Graian Alps

Climbing
- First ascent: 20 August 1882 by William Woodman Graham with guides Auguste Cupelin and Alphonse Payot
- Easiest route: South-west face (AD)

The Dent du Géant (It.: Dente del Gigante, "giant's tooth") (4,013 m) is a mountain in the Mont Blanc massif in France and Italy.

The Dent du Géant remained unclimbed during the golden age of alpinism, and was a much-coveted peak in the 1870s, repelling many parties who attempted it mostly from the Rochefort ridge. In 1880 the strong team of Albert F. Mummery and Alexander Burgener tried to force a passage via the south-west face but were repulsed by a band of slabs, causing Mummery to exclaim, 'Absolutely inaccessible by fair means!'

The mountain has two summits, 27 metres (88 ft) apart and separated by a small col (an 'extremely awkward notch' according to W. W. Graham):

- Pointe Sella (4,009 m), first ascent via the south-west face by Jean Joseph Maquignaz with son Baptiste Maquignaz and nephew, Daniel Maquignaz on 28 July 1882. Over a period of four days they placed iron stanchions and fixed ropes, enabling the same party to climb Pointe Sella a second time on the following day with clients Alessandro Sella, Alfonso Sella, Corradino Sella and Gaudenzio Sella.
- Pointe Graham (4,013 m), first ascent by W. W. Graham with guides Auguste Cupelin and Alphonse Payot on 20 August 1882. They used the fixed ropes of "Sella's staircase" to repeat the ascent of Pointe Sella, where Graham noted that one of the Maquignazes had carved the letter 'M' on a rock step. They then lowered themselves 12 metres (39 ft) into the col to climb this higher north-east peak.

This ascent marked the end of the so-called silver age of alpinism.

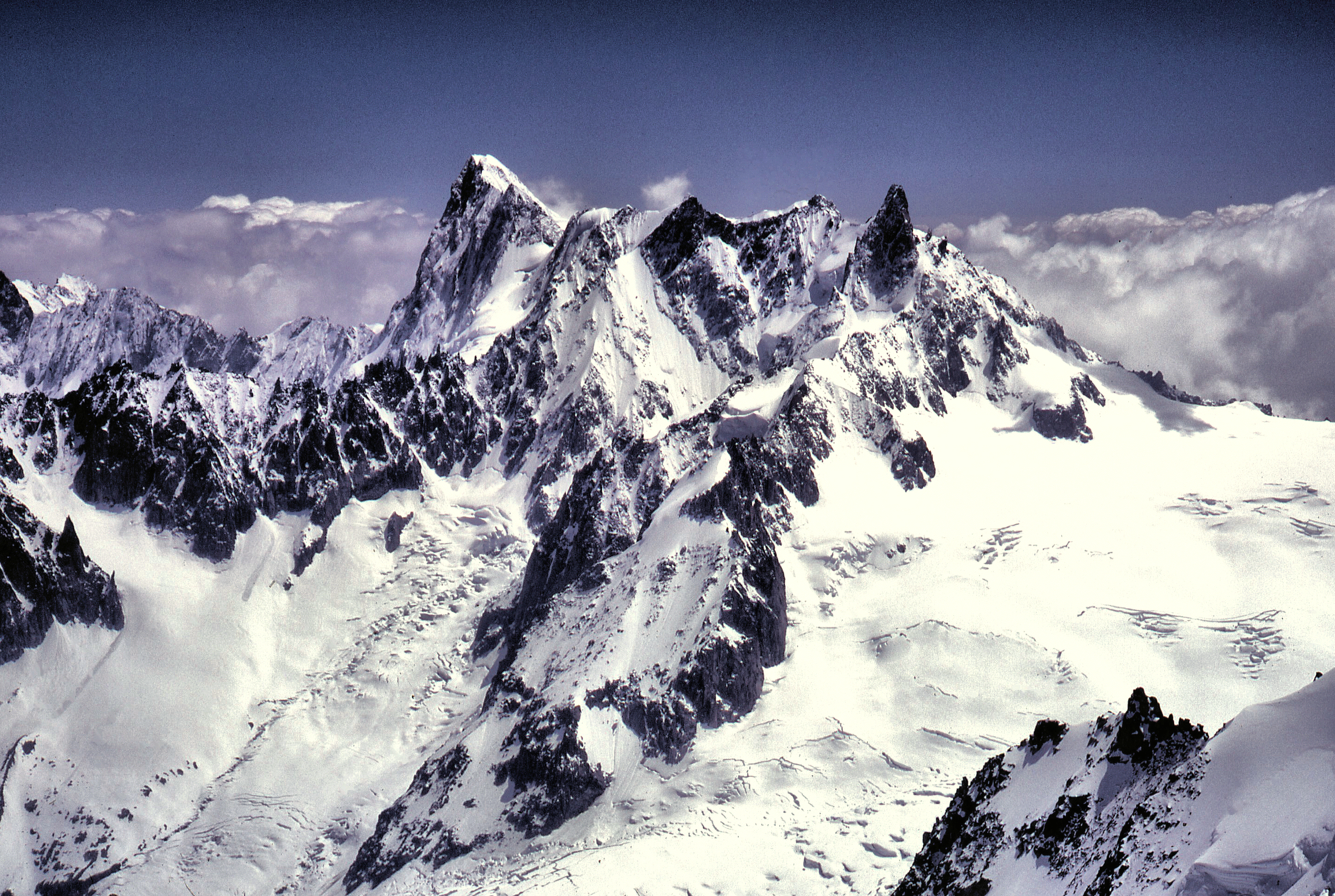
The Dent du Géant is the dark pinnacle on the right-hand end of the Rochefort ridge

On 28 July 1935 the Austrian climbers Herbert Burggasser and Rudi Leitz first ascended the vertical-to-overhanging 160 m-high south face. It was the first climb in the Western Alps systematically aided by the pitons and artificial techniques that were already in use by climbers in the Eastern Alps.

During a heat wave in the summer of 2019, a glaciological rarity in the form of a previously unseen lake emerged at the foot of the Dent du Géant, the Aiguilles Marbrées and the Col de Rochefort at an altitude of about 3400 meters, that was considered as evidence for the effects of global warming on the glaciers in the Alps.

The following facilities serve the mountain:

- Torino Hut (3,375 m, CAI, all year)
- Pointe Helbronner (3,462 m, téléphérique station for Skyway Monte Bianco)

== See also ==
- List of 4000 metre peaks of the Alps
