= Torino Hut =

Mountain refuge in the Alps

Torino Hut Rifugio Torino Refuge Turin
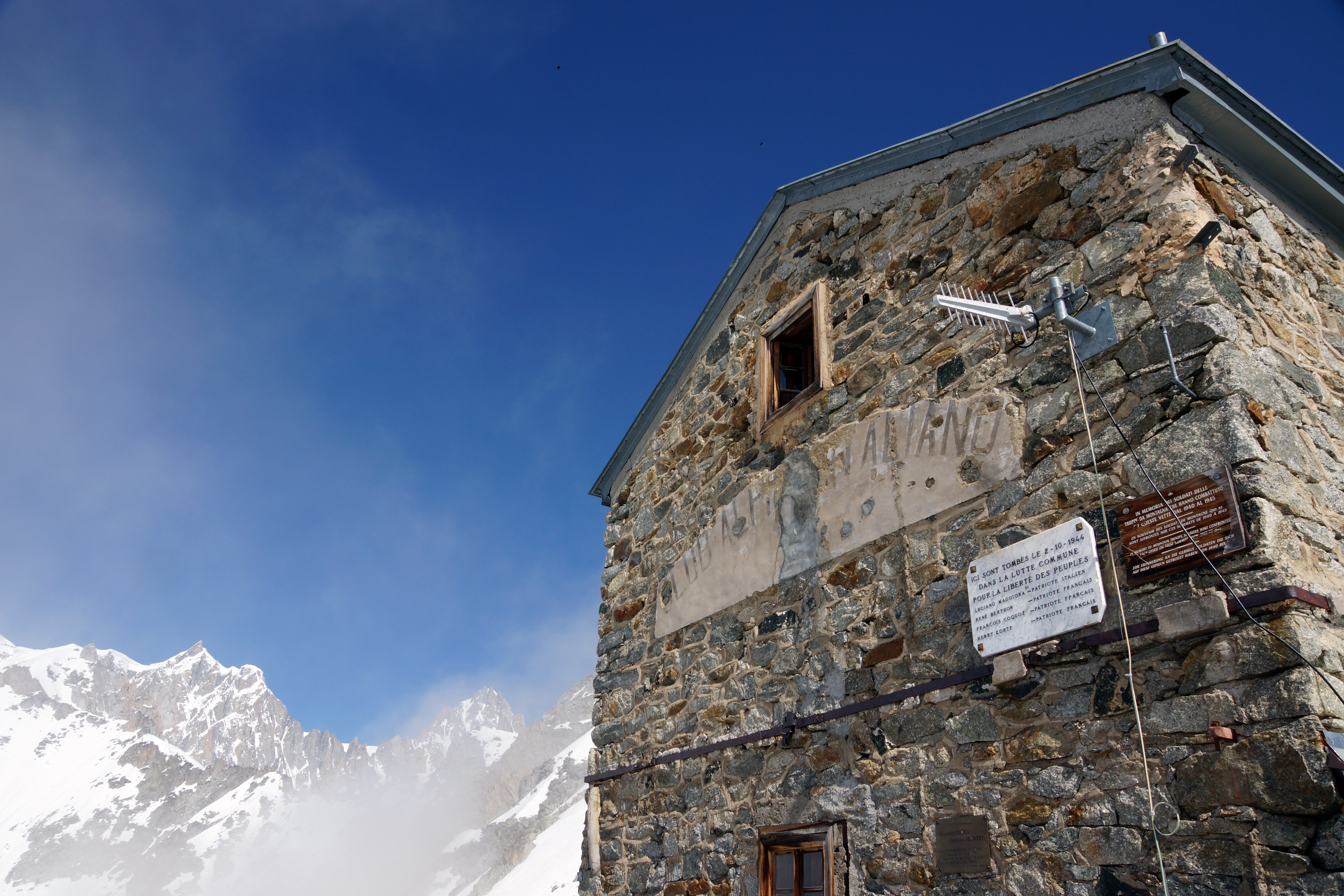
- Original Torino Hut (1898) in 2013
- Interactive map of the Torino Hut; Rifugio Torino; Refuge Turin area

General information
- Location: Pointe Helbronner
- Coordinates: 45°50′42″N 6°56′2.4″E
- Elevation: 3,375 m (11,073 ft)
- Year built: 1898

Website
- www.rifugiotorino.com

The Torino Hut (Italian: Rifugio Torino; French: Refuge Turin) is a high mountain refuge in the Alps in northwestern Italy. Located near the border with France, it is about 15 km (10 mi) southwest of Mont Dolent, the tripoint with Switzerland. The refuge is in the Mont Blanc massif above the town of Courmayeur in the Aosta Valley, Italy. It can be most easily accessed from the Italian side by the Skyway Monte Bianco cable car from La Palud in Courmayeur, with a change at the Pavilion du Mont Fréty. It can also be reached from Chamonix via the Aiguille du Midi, either by cable car which crosses the massif, or by a long crossing of the Glacier du Gèant. The refuge lies nearly directly above the 11.6 km (7.2 mi) Mont Blanc Tunnel, which passes deep underground, and connects Courmayeur to Chamonix.

== Description ==
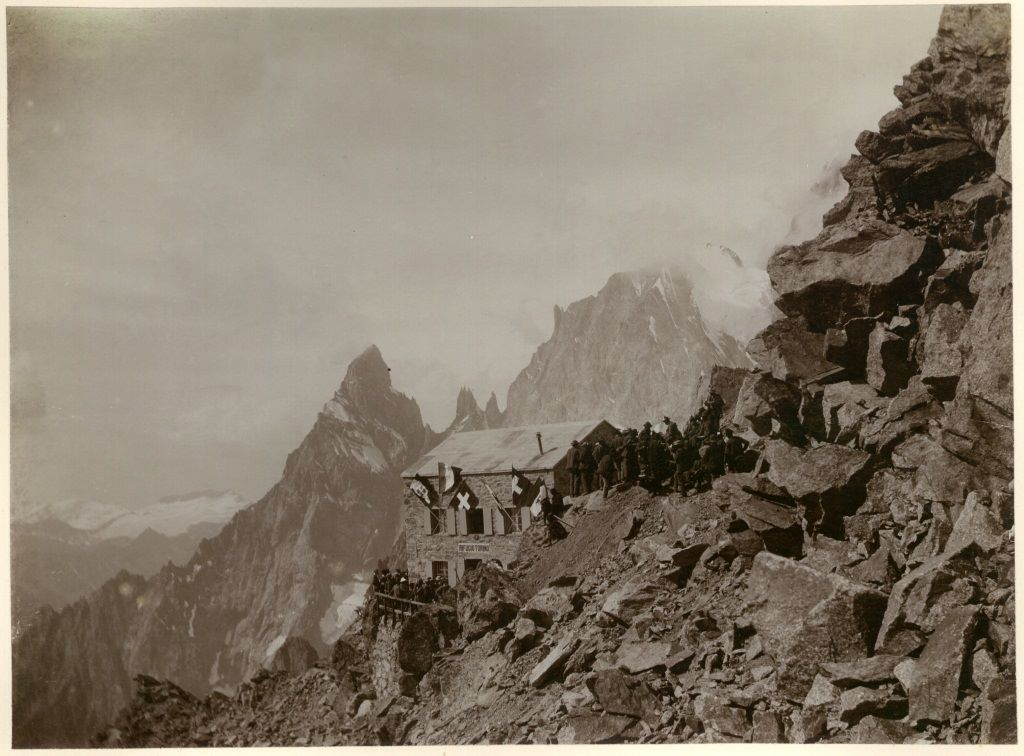
The hut's opening

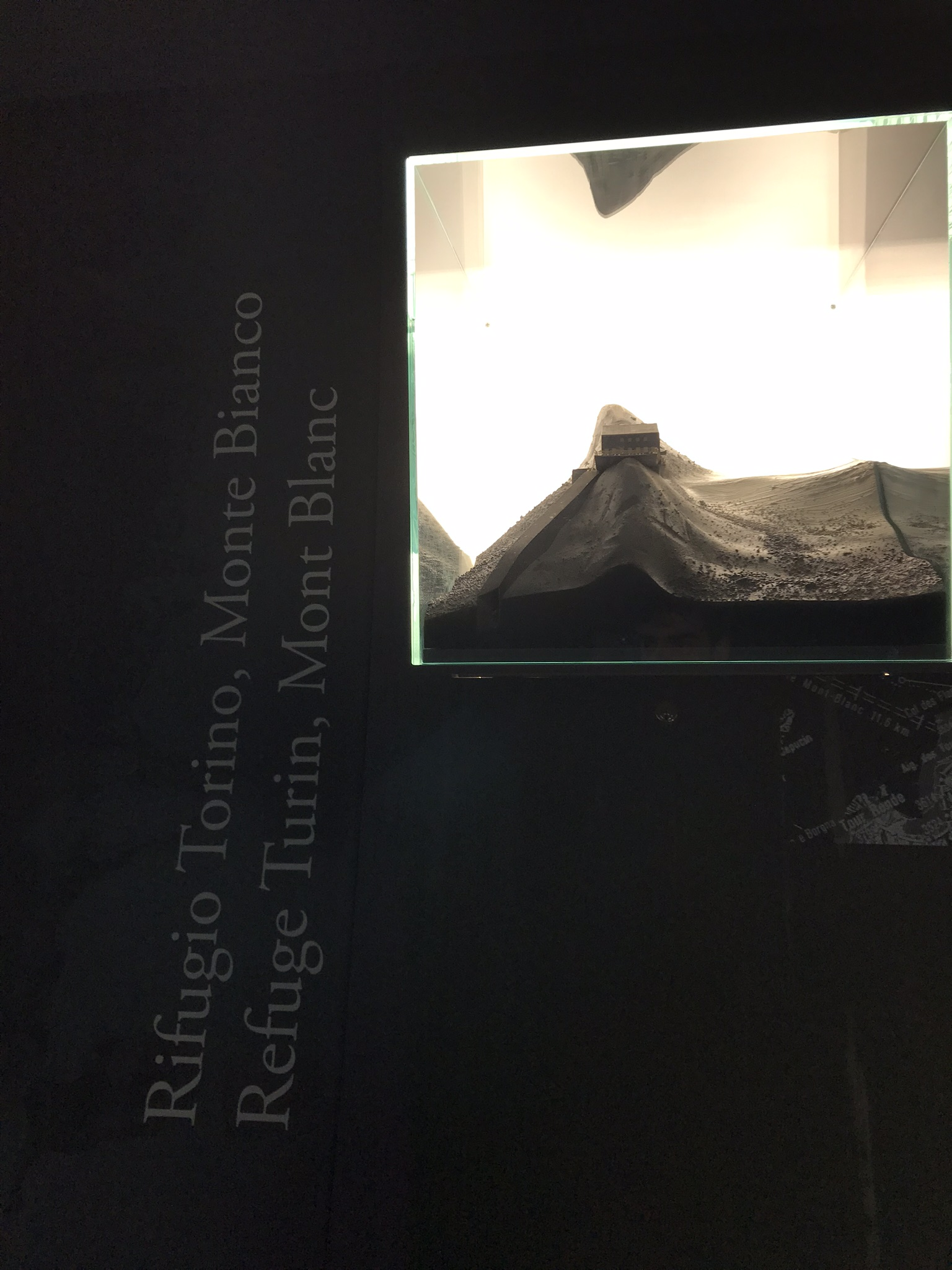
Model of the Turin Hut at the Museum of the Alps (Bard Fort)

The original hut was built by the Turin section of the Italian Alpine Club in 1898, near the cable car station. Over time, the refuge was enlarged several times, and today accommodates 38 guests. It is situated on the southeast spur of Pointe Helbronner, at the terminus of the second section of the Mont Blanc cable car at 3,329 m (10,922 ft).

The new hut, located 55 m (180 ft) higher than the original refuge at 3,375 m (11,073 ft), was completed in 1952 and accommodates 160 guests. The new refuge is accessible by an internal staircase equipped with a service lift for skis and mountaineering equipment. A panoramic trail, accessible during the summer, also leads to the new refuge.

From the refuge, climbers can descend to the Toula Glacier or the Vallée Blanche, or do one of the numerous ascents on ice in the Combe Maudite and Mont Blanc du Tacul basins. Other mountaineering excursions in the area are the Dent du Géant (Giant's Tooth), the Rochefort ridge, the Tour Ronde, the Aiguille d'Entrèves, Aiguilles Marbrées, Grand Capucin, and the Tacul satellites.

In the summer, the hut operates a bar and restaurant with a terrace that offers panoramic views of all the surrounding peaks of the Aosta Valley, the Savoy, and the Valais. Sunbathing in the high mountains is also popular on the terraces.

== Nearby summits ==
The following nearby summits are part of the Mont Blanc massif.

- Mont Maudit – 4,465 m (14,649 ft)
- Mont Blanc du Tacul – 4,248 m (13,937 ft)
- Dent du Géant – 4,013 m (13,166 ft)
