= Pointe Helbronner =

Mountain in the Mont Blanc massif

- Punta Helbronner
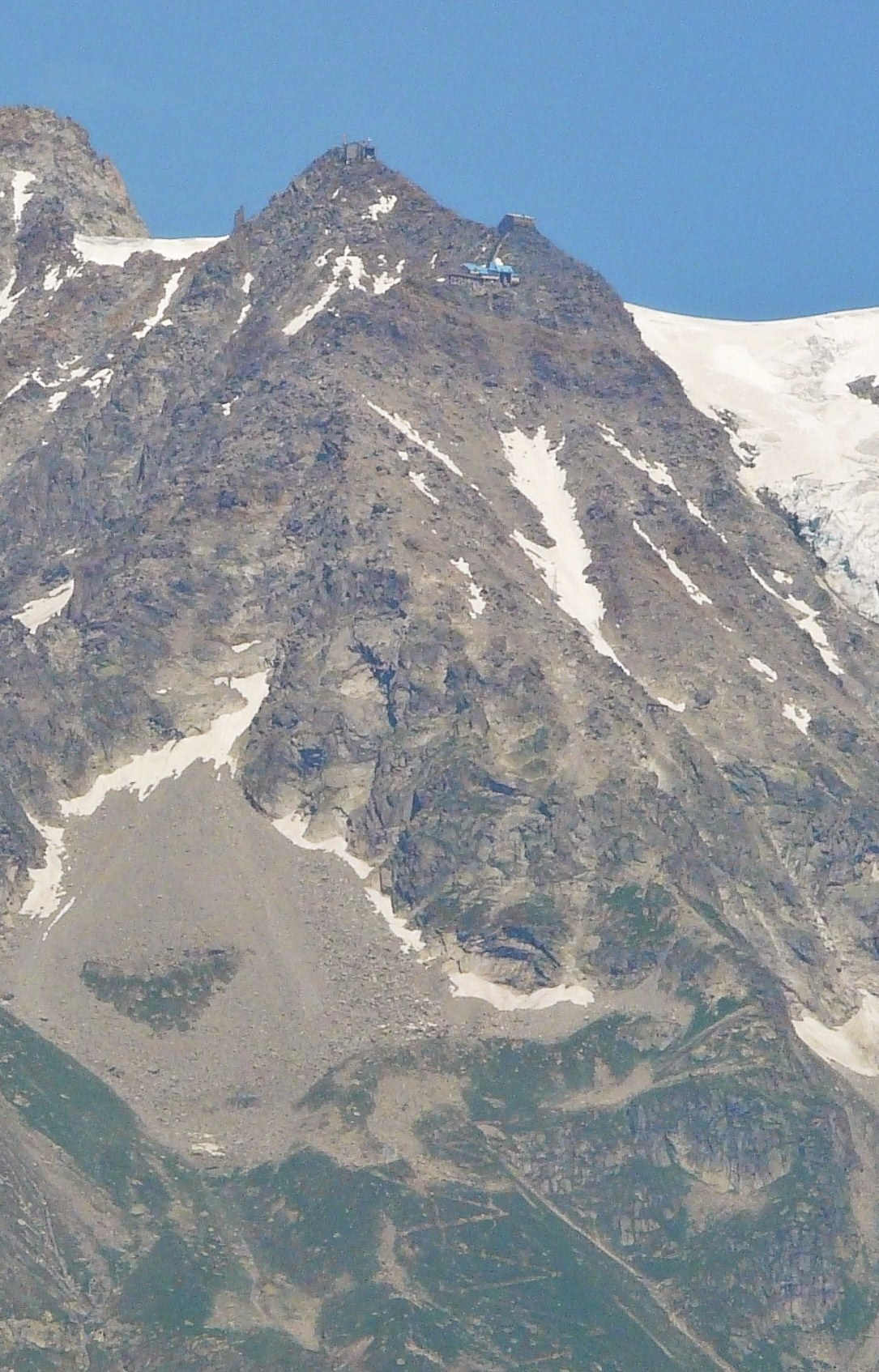

Highest point
- Elevation: 3,462 m (11,358 ft)
- Coordinates: 45°50′45″N 6°55′54″E

Naming
- English translation: Helbronner Peak
- Language of name: French / Italian

Geography
- Location within France
- Location: Aosta Valley, Italy / Haute-Savoie, France
- Parent range: Mont Blanc Massif

Climbing
- Easiest route: cable car

Pointe Helbronner (3,462 m (11,358 ft)) is a mountain in the Mont Blanc massif in the Graian Alps on the watershed between France and Italy.

The peak, which used to be a mere geodetic reference point, was named after Paul Helbronner, a French polytechnicien, alpinist and geodesist who pioneered cartography of the French Alps.

Pointe Helbronner is served on the Italian side by the Skyway Monte Bianco, a cable car from La Palud, a village 2.5 kilometres (1.6 mi) north of the town of Courmayeur in the Aosta Valley. Pointe Helbronner is also served by the Vallee Blanche Aerial Tramway, which crosses from the peak to the nearby peak of Aiguille du Midi in France—a peak-to-peak distance of 5 km (3.1 mi). This, in turn, gives access to the French Téléphérique de l'Aiguille du Midi, the cable car connecting Aiguille du Midi to the French village of Chamonix, Courmayeur's sister "city".

The Skyway Monte Bianco station platform on Pointe Helbronner, split by the French-Italian border, offers a vista over the Aosta Valley and the Piedmont region.

Pointe Helbronner is the starting point of a ski run via the Glacier du Géant and the Mer de Glace to Montenvers and Chamonix. The mountain is the starting point of various routes to other mountains on the Mont Blanc massif, with many mountaineers staying at the nearby Refuge Torino.

In June 2015, Italian Prime Minister Matteo Renzi expressed repeated claims on the territory.
