= A Neuve Hut =

Mountain hut in the Swiss Alps

Cabane de l'A Neuve
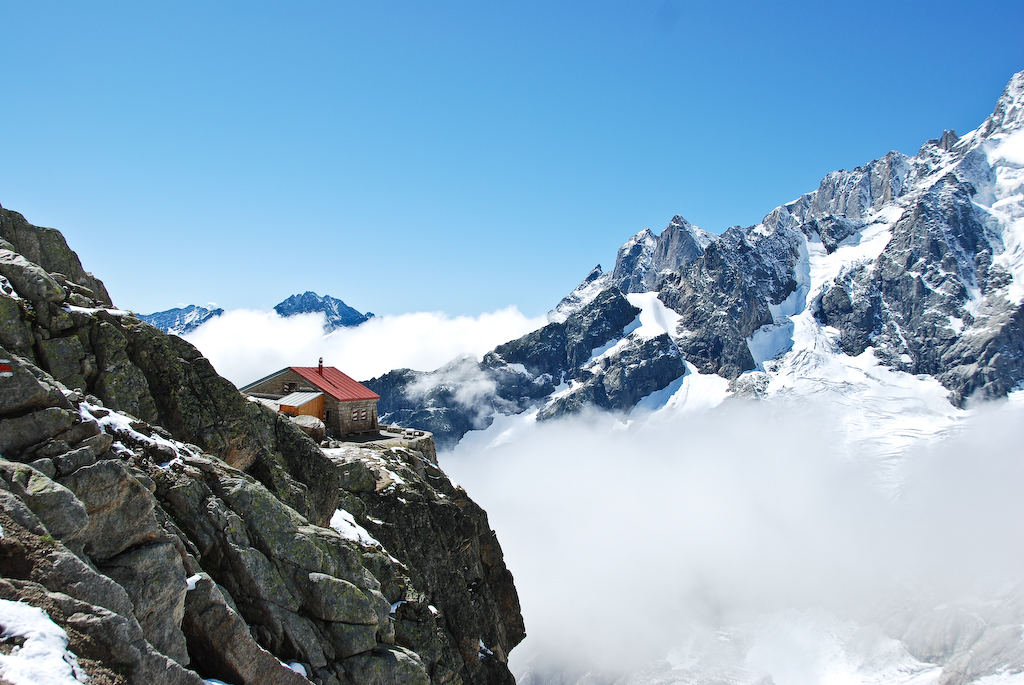
- Cabane de l'A Neuve
- Interactive map of the Cabane de l'A Neuve area
- Alternative names: Cabane Dufour

General information
- Type: Alpine hut
- Location: Switzerland
- Coordinates: 45.9489°N 7.0669°E
- Opened: 1926
- Owner: CAS Diablerets

Website
- http://www.aneuve.ch/

The Cabane de l'A Neuve (or A Neuve Hut) is a mountain hut in the Swiss Alps at 2,735 metres above sea level open for visitors. It can be reached from the Val Ferret. The hut lies below the Grand Darray (3,514 m) on the south side in the Mont Blanc Massif. Other summits close to the hut are the Tour Noir (3,835 m), the Grande Lui (3,509 m) and the Mont Dolent (3,823 m). Inauguration was 4 September 1927.
