= Petit Darray =

Mountain in Switzerland

- Location within Switzerland

Highest point
- Elevation: 3,508 m (11,509 ft)
- Prominence: 68 m (223 ft)
- Parent peak: Grand Darray
- Coordinates: 45°57′37″N 07°03′25″E

Geography
- Location: Valais, Switzerland
- Parent range: Mont Blanc Massif

The Petit Darray (also spelled Petit Darrey) (3,508 m) is a mountain of the Mont Blanc Massif, located north of La Fouly in the canton of Valais. It lies west of the Grand Darray, on the range south of the Saleina Glacier.
