= Grand Darray =

Mountain of the Mont Blanc massif

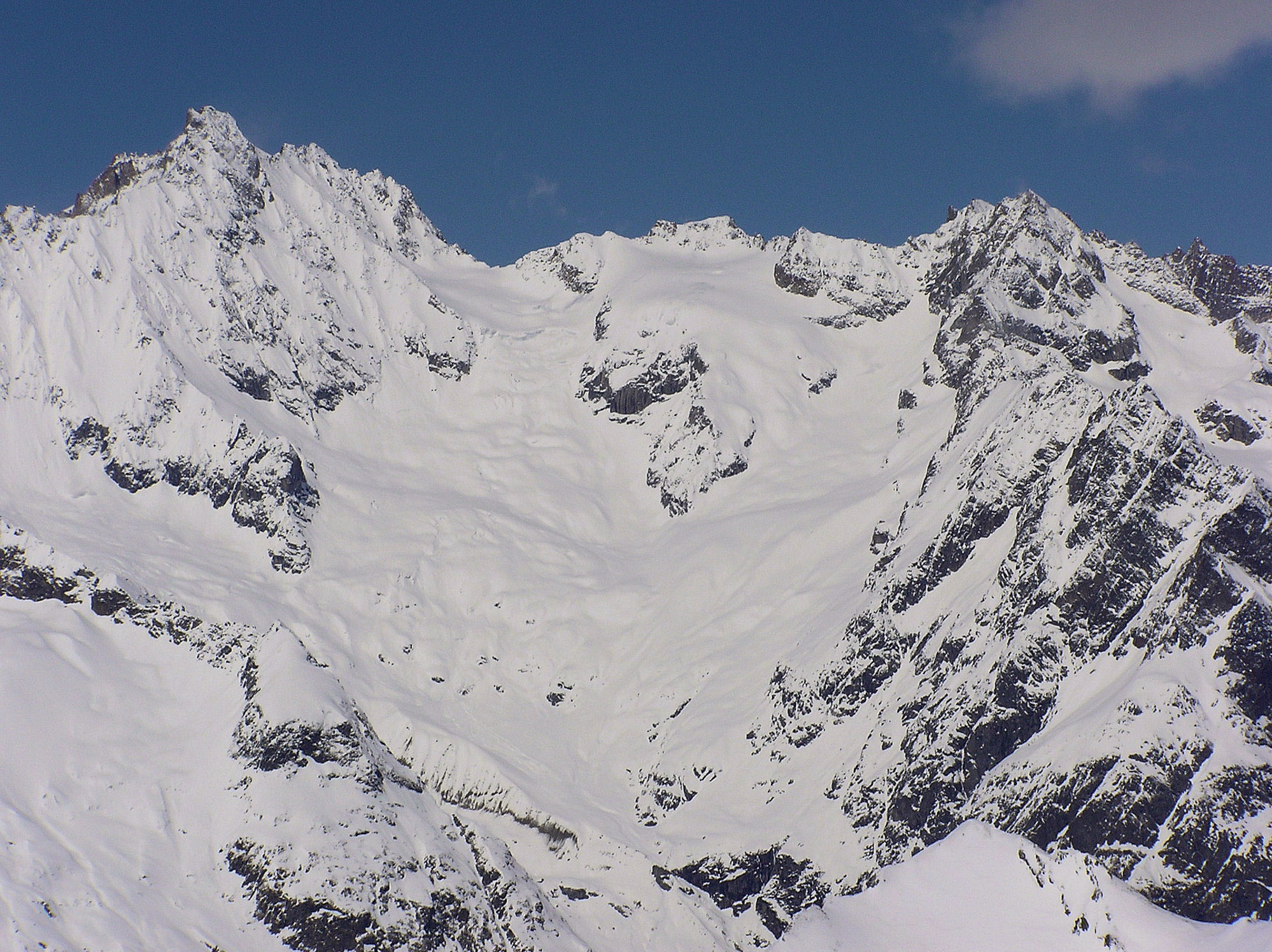
- Tour Noir (left) and Grand Darray (right) from the south

Highest point
- Elevation: 3,514 m (11,529 ft)
- Prominence: 124 m (407 ft)
- Coordinates: 45°57′32″N 07°03′37.6″E

Geography
- Location within Switzerland
- Location: Valais, Switzerland
- Parent range: Mont Blanc Massif

The Grand Darray (also spelled Grand Darrey) (3,514 m) is a mountain of the Mont Blanc massif, located north of La Fouly in the canton of Valais in Switzerland. It lies on the range east of the Aiguille de l'A Neuve, between the Saleina Glacier and the main Ferret valley.
