= Elena Hut =

Coordinates: 45°53′04″N 7°03′56″E

Elena Hut (Italian: Refugio Elena; French: Refuge Hélène), is a refuge in the Alps in Aosta Valley, Italy.

== Name ==
The refuge gains its name from that of a young shepherdess, Hélène, living with her father in the meadows of Pré-de-Bar.

== Location ==
It is located on the southern edge of the Mont Blanc massif at the eastern end of the Italian Val Ferret at an altitude of 2,062 metres. It is commonly used as an overnight stop for walkers undertaking the eleven-day Tour du Mont Blanc, and above the refuge the path crosses into Switzerland at the Col du Grand Ferret (2,537 m).

It was built shortly before World War II, but destroyed by avalanche in 1960. It was rebuilt in 1995 and can be reached in an hour's walk from the valley car park at Arnouvaz.

== Gallery ==
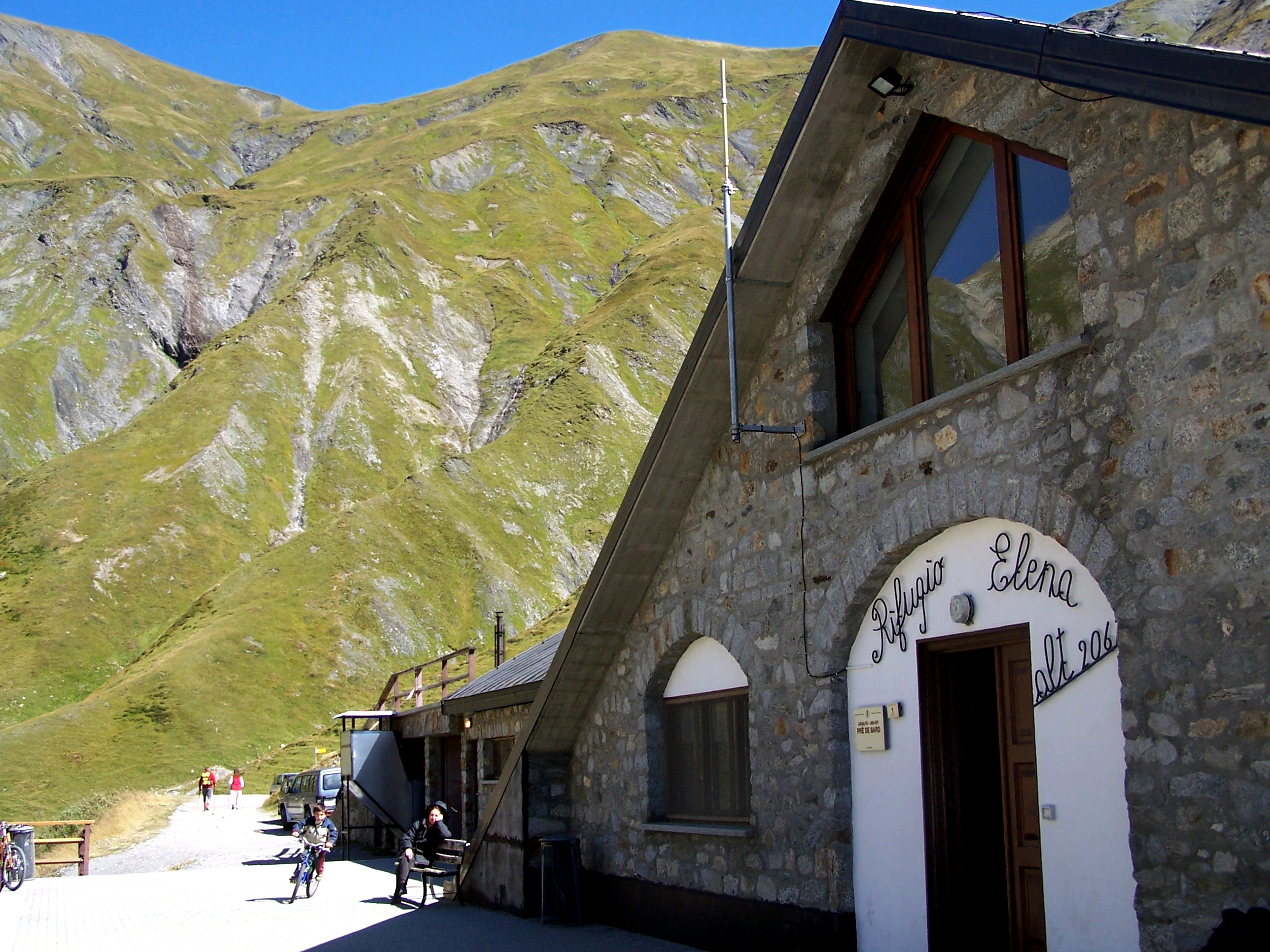

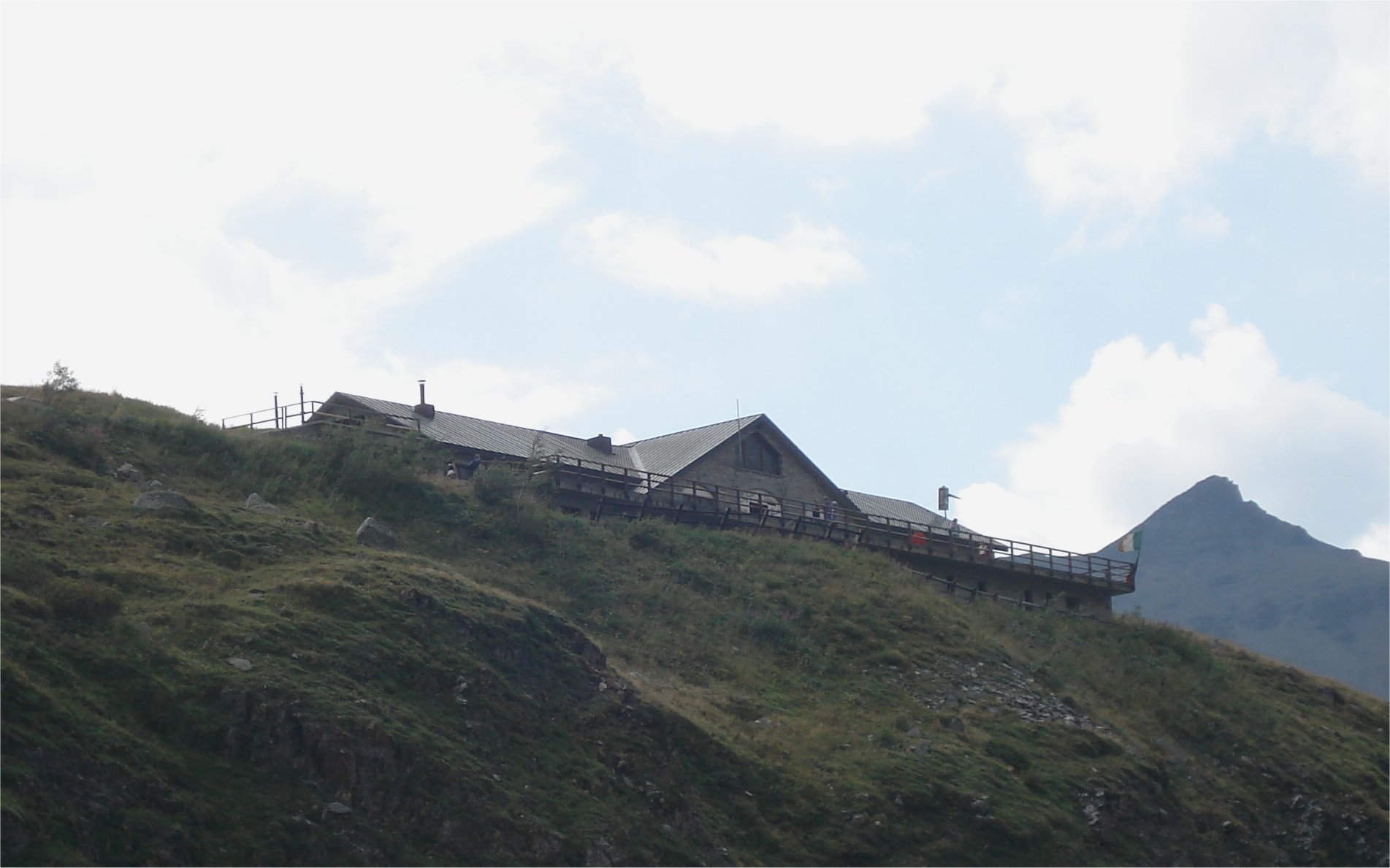

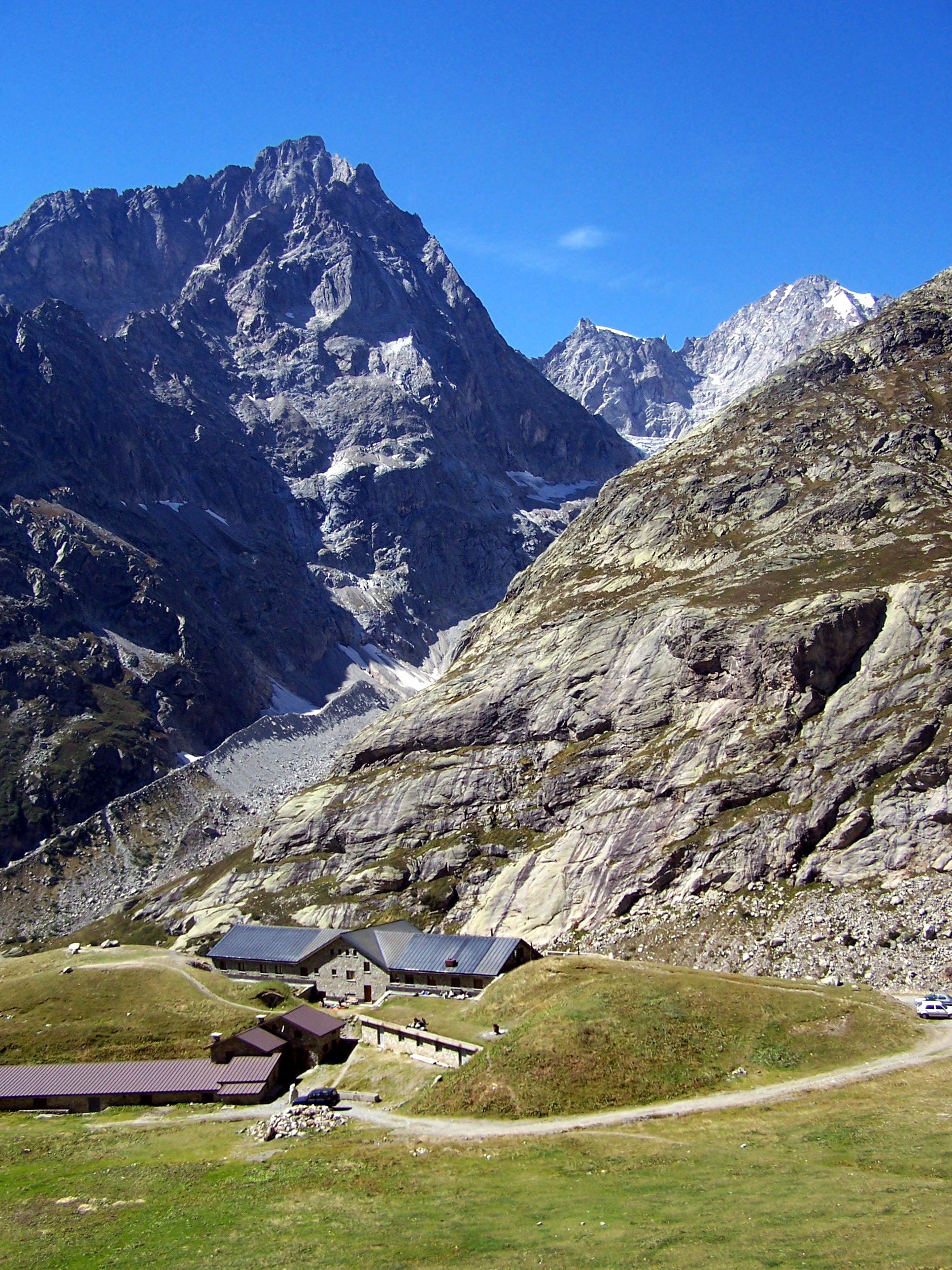
