= Grande Lui =

Mountain of the Mont Blanc massif, located west of La Fouly in the canton of Valais

- Location within Switzerland

Highest point
- Elevation: 3,509 m (11,512 ft)
- Prominence: 106 m (348 ft)
- Coordinates: 45°57′30.4″N 07°02′52.9″E

Geography
- Location: Valais, Switzerland
- Parent range: Mont Blanc Massif

The Grande Lui or Grand-Luy (Lui or Luy being toponyms designating a rock) (3,509 m) is a mountain of the Mont Blanc massif, located west of La Fouly in the canton of Valais. It lies east of the Aiguille de l'A Neuve, on the range between the glaciers of Saleina and L'A Neuve.
