= Petit Grépillon =

Mountain in Italy/Switzerland

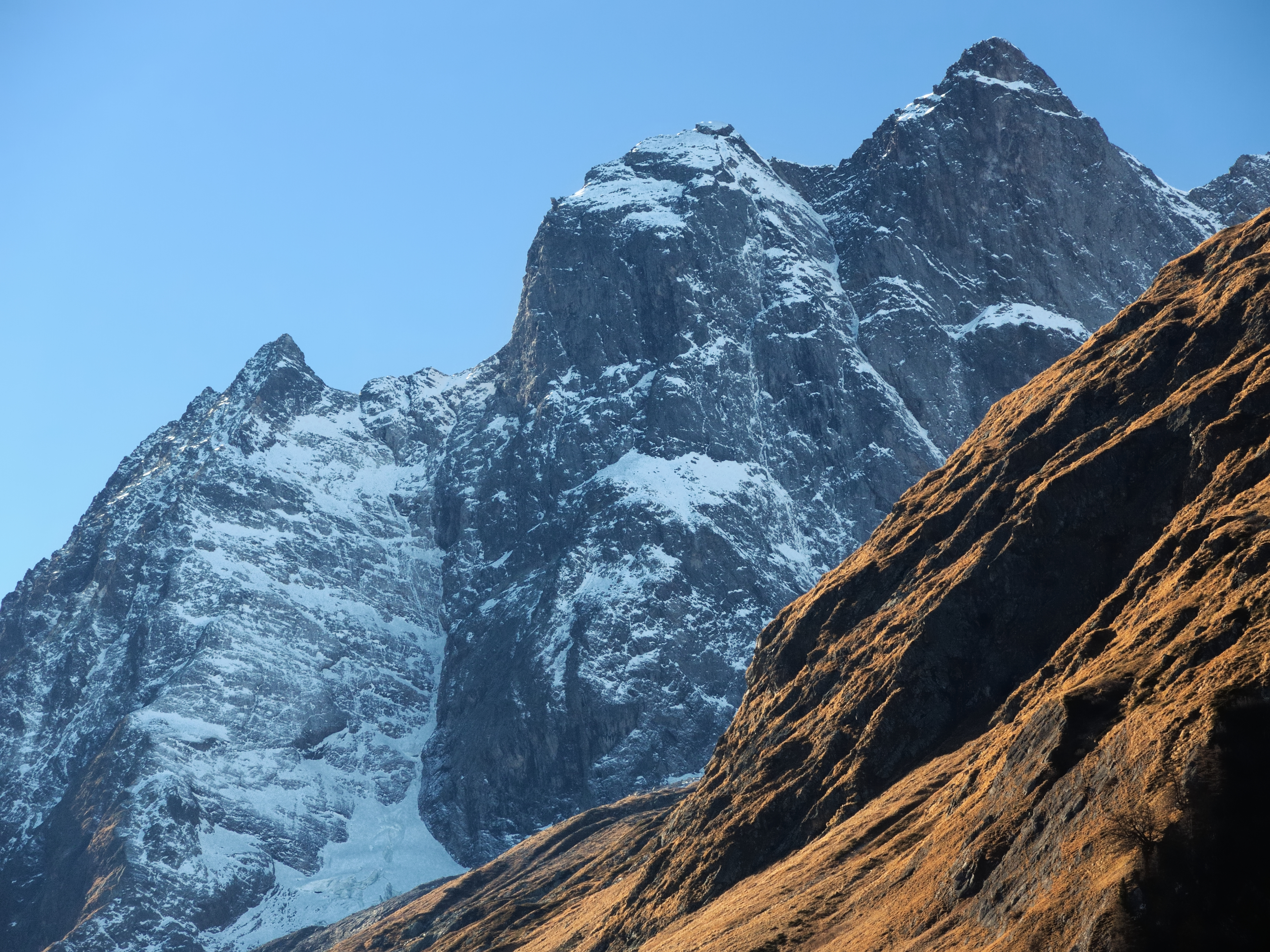
- View from La Fouly (north face)

Highest point
- Elevation: 3,358 m (11,017 ft)
- Prominence: 88 m (289 ft)
- Coordinates: 45°54′48.2″N 7°03′38″E

Geography
- Location within Alps
- Location: Valais, Switzerland; Aosta Valley, Italy
- Parent range: Mont Blanc Massif

The Petit Grépillon is a mountain of the Mont Blanc Massif, located on the border between Italy and Switzerland. It lies on the range south-east of Mont Dolent, between the glaciers of Pré de Bard (Aosta Valley) and Dolent (Valais).
