= Petit Col Ferret =

Alpine pass

- Col du Petit Ferret
- Location within Alps
- Elevation: 2,490 metres (8,170 ft)
- Traversed by: footpath

Third Approach
- Location: Italy–Switzerland border
- Range: Alps (Graian Alps/Pennine Alps)
- Coordinates: 45.8985011°N 7.0682980°E

The Petit Col Ferret (or Col du Petit Ferret) is an Alpine pass between the canton of Valais and the Aosta Valley.

== Features ==
The pass stands on the main chain of the Alps at an elevation of 2,490 m. It separates the Mont Blanc Massif (thus the Graian Alps) from the Pennine Alps.

In spite of this peculiarity, it is less known and frequented than the neighbouring Col du Grand Ferret (often simply named as Col Ferret), which is located South of the Petit Col Ferret on the route of the Tour du Mont Blanc. The two passes are divided by the modest elevation of the Tête de Ferret (2,714 m).

== Access ==
The pass is located on the access route to the Fiorio hut at 2,274 m), which can be used as a foothold for ascents and hikes around the Pré de Bar glacier. Both the accesses from Italy and from Switzerland are more challenging than the ones to the Col du Grand Ferret.

== See also ==
- List of mountain passes
