= Pointe des Plines =

Minor peak on the east edge of the Mont Blanc massif

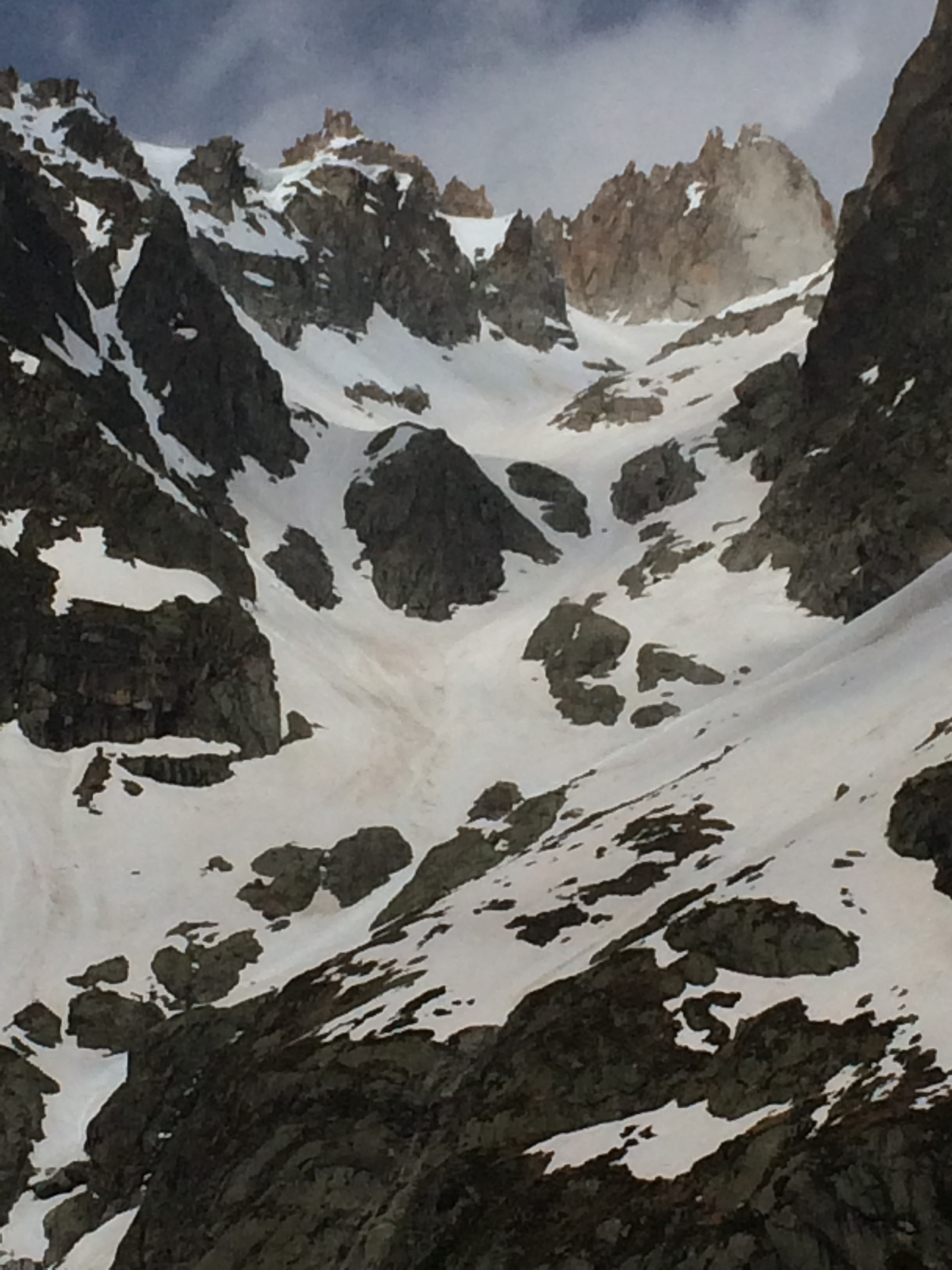
- Pointe des Plines

Highest point
- Elevation: 3,052 m (10,013 ft)
- Prominence: 42 m (138 ft)
- Coordinates: 45°58′50″N 7°03′20″E

Geography
- Location within Switzerland
- Location: Valais, Switzerland
- Parent range: Mont Blanc Massif

The Pointe des Plines (3,052 m) is a minor peak on the east edge of the Mont Blanc massif, close to the Aiguille Dorees, and overlooking the Saleina Glacier in the canton of Valais.

A shelter of the Swiss Alpine Club, the Bivouac de l'Envers des Dorées, is located west of the summit.
