= Grande Pointe des Planereuses =

Mountain of the Mont Blanc massif

- Location within Switzerland

Highest point
- Elevation: 3,151 m (10,338 ft)
- Prominence: 121 m (397 ft)
- Coordinates: 45°58′05.7″N 07°04′20.2″E

Geography
- Location: Valais, Switzerland
- Parent range: Mont Blanc Massif

The Grande Pointe des Planereuses is a mountain of the Mont Blanc massif, located west of Praz de Fort in the canton of Valais, Switzerland. It lies on the range south of the Saleina Glacier.
