= Col Ferret =

Alpine pass

- Col du Grand Ferret
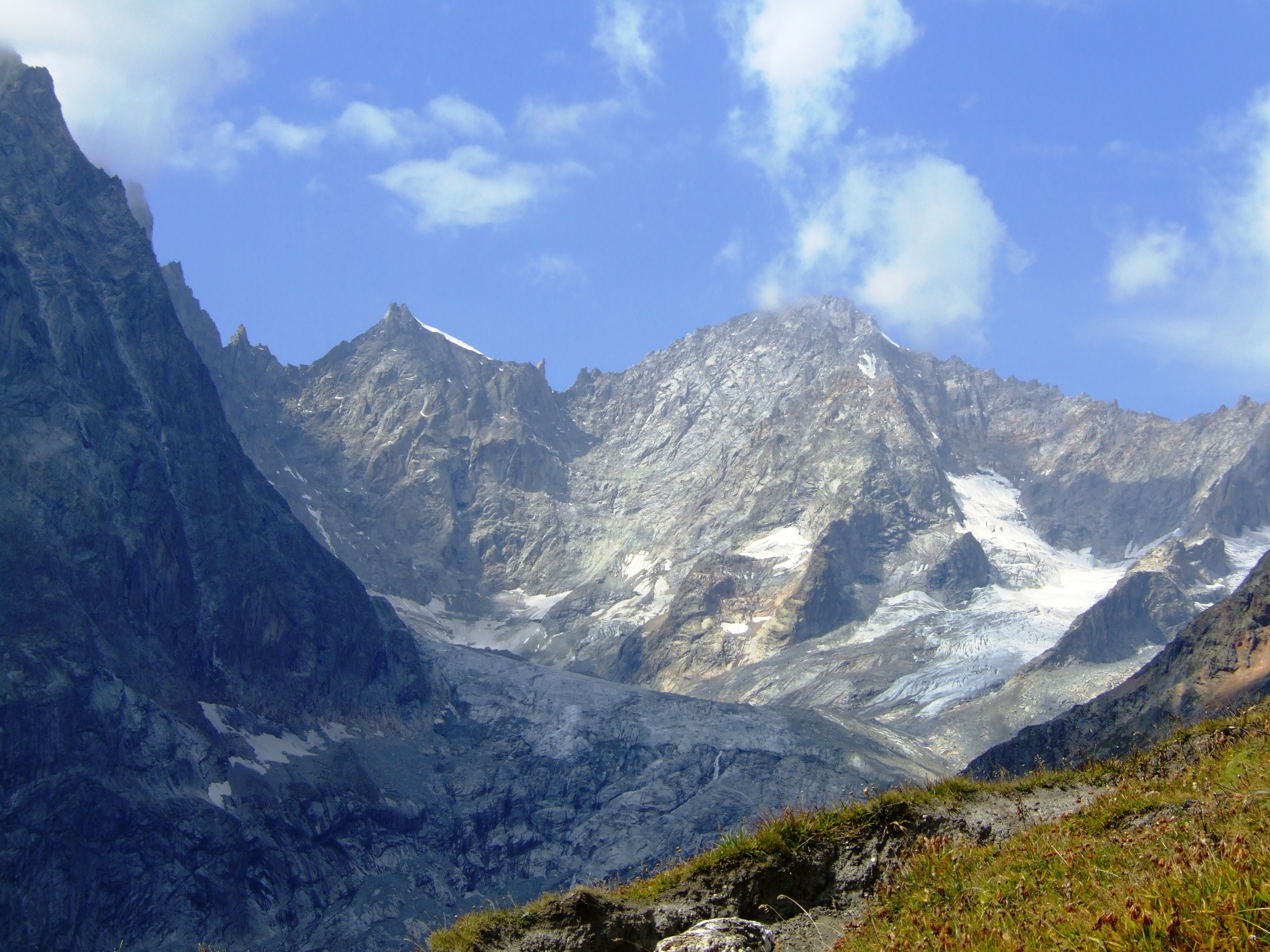

- Location within Alps
- Elevation: 2,537 metres (8,323 ft)
- Traversed by: Trail

Third Approach
- Location: Italy–Switzerland border
- Range: Alps
- Coordinates: 45.8890289°N 7.0778615°E

The Col Ferret (or Grand Col Ferret) is an Alpine pass between the canton of Valais and the Aosta Valley (2,537 metres (8,323 ft)). It is crossed by the route of the Tour du Mont Blanc. Close to it stands the Petit Col Ferret, at an elevation of 2,490 metres (8,170 ft), which separates the Mont Blanc Massif from the Pennine Alps.

== See also ==
- List of mountain passes
