= Saleina Hut =

Mountain hut in the Swiss Alps

Coordinates: 45°58′35″N 7°04′13.4″E

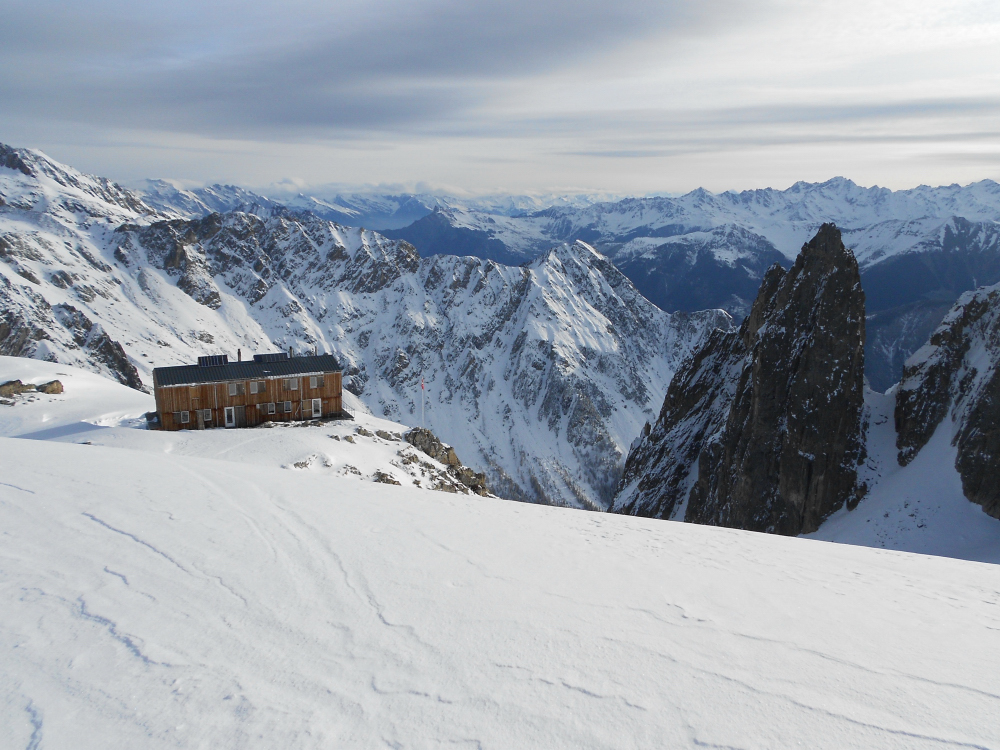
Cabane de Saleina

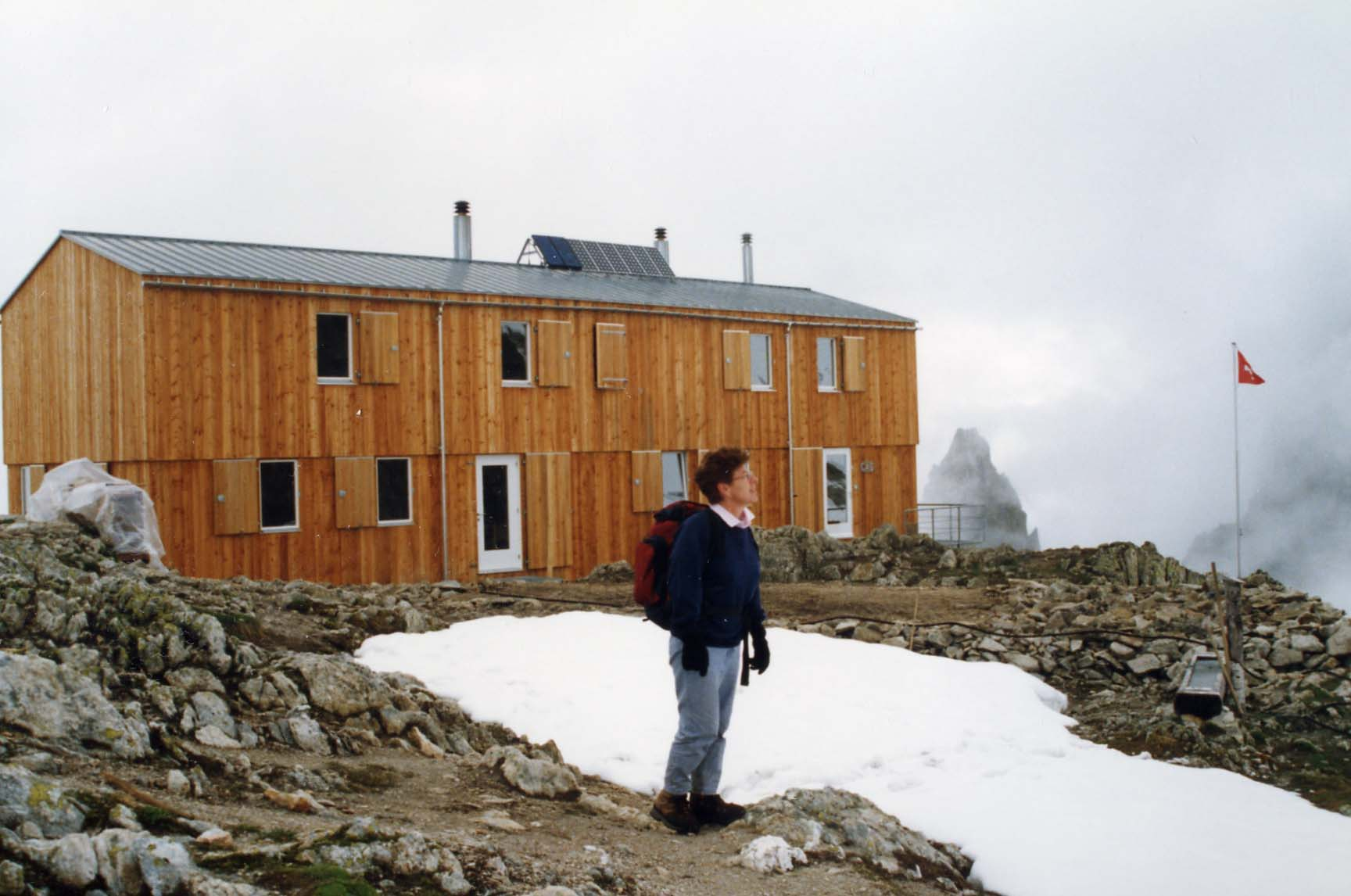
Cabane de Saleinaz

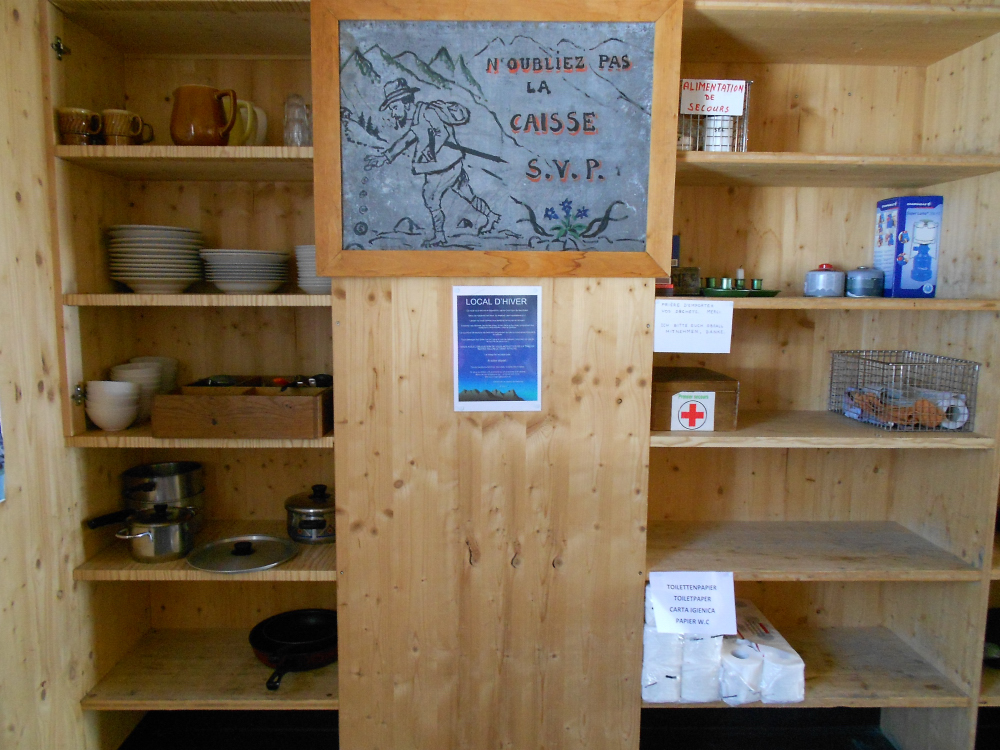
Cabane de Saleina - winter room

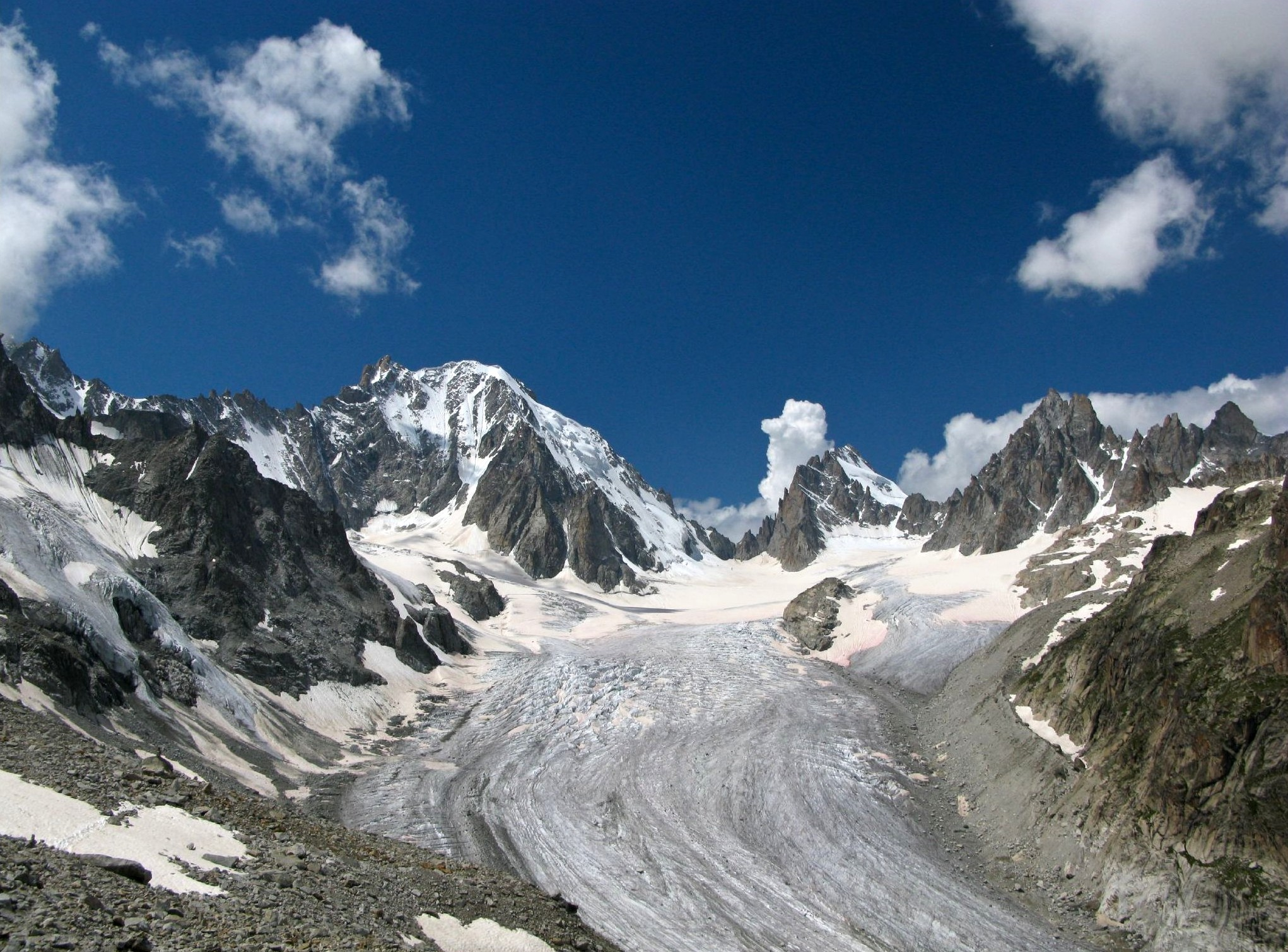
Aiguille d'Argentière above the Saleina Glacier

The Saleina Hut (French: Cabane de Saleina, formerly spelled Saleinaz) is a mountain hut in the Swiss Alps at 2,691 meters above sea level. It can be reached from the Val Ferret. The hut lies above the Saleina Glacier near the Aiguille d'Argentière in the Mont Blanc Massif, and has places for 48 people and is wardened between mid-June to mid-September.
