= Aiguille de l'A Neuve =

Mountain of the Mont Blanc massif

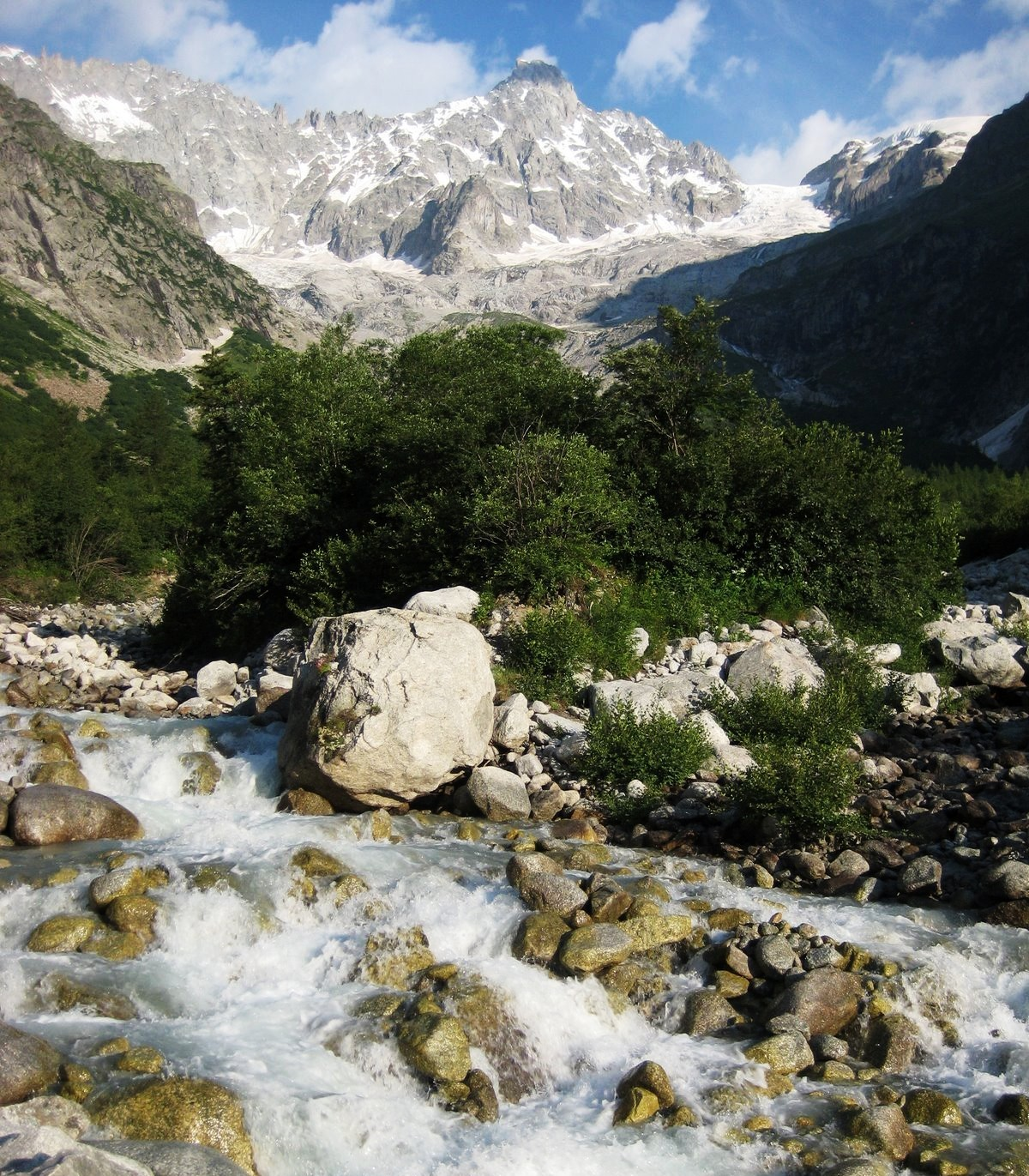
- Tour Noir seen from Val Ferret, Valais

Highest point
- Elevation: 3,753 m (12,313 ft)
- Prominence: 63 m (207 ft)
- Parent peak: Tour Noir
- Coordinates: 45°57′10.6″N 7°2′9.8″E

Geography
- Location within Alps
- Location: Valais, Switzerland; Haute-Savoie, France
- Parent range: Mont Blanc Massif

The Aiguille de l'A Neuve is a mountain of the Mont Blanc massif, located on the border between Switzerland and France. It lies close to the Tour Noir to the south.

The closest locality is La Fouly (Valais).
