= Val Ferret =

Name shared by two valleys separated by the Col Ferret

Coordinates: 45°56′34.97″N 7°05′25.81″E

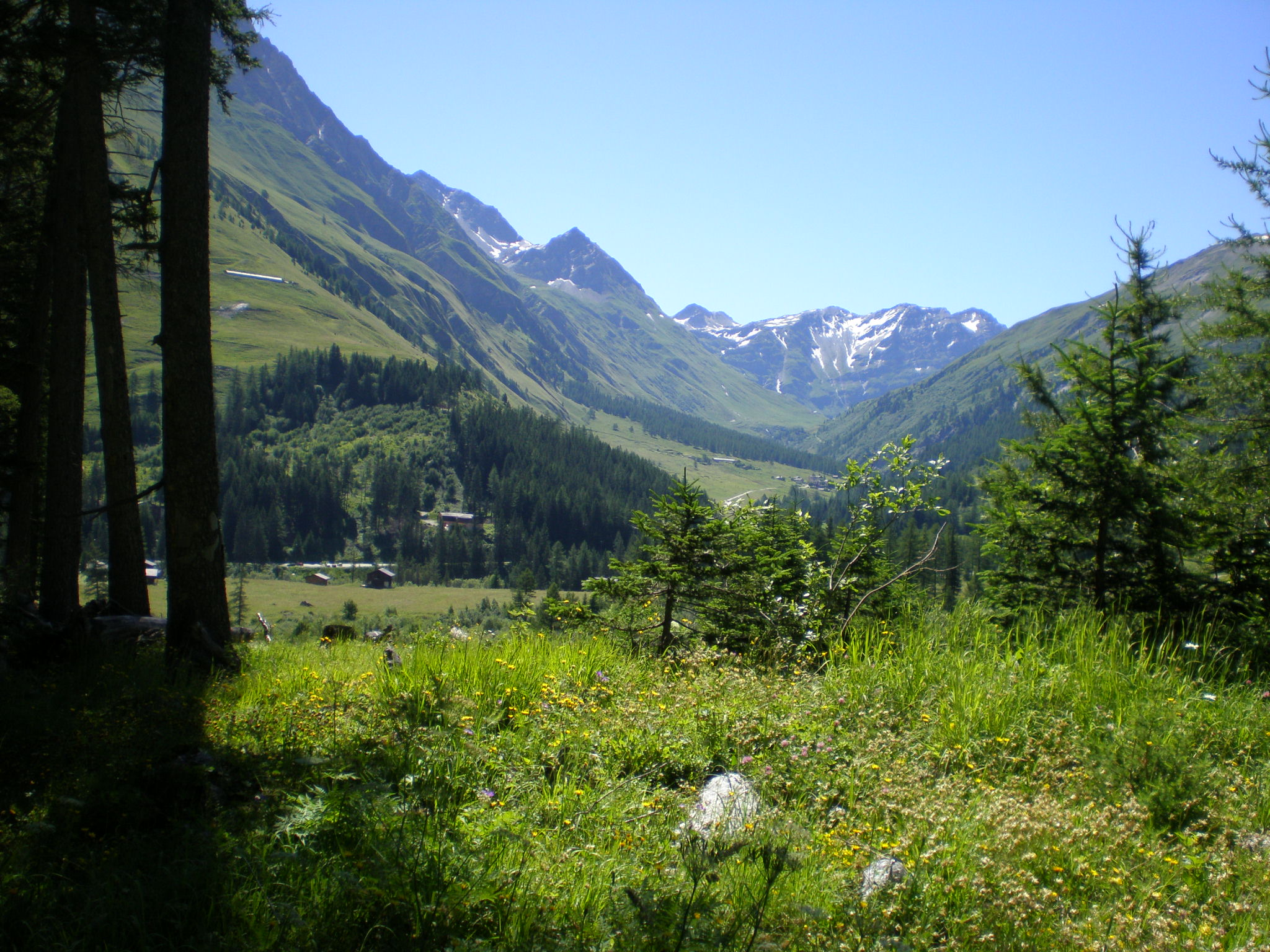
The Swiss Val Ferret

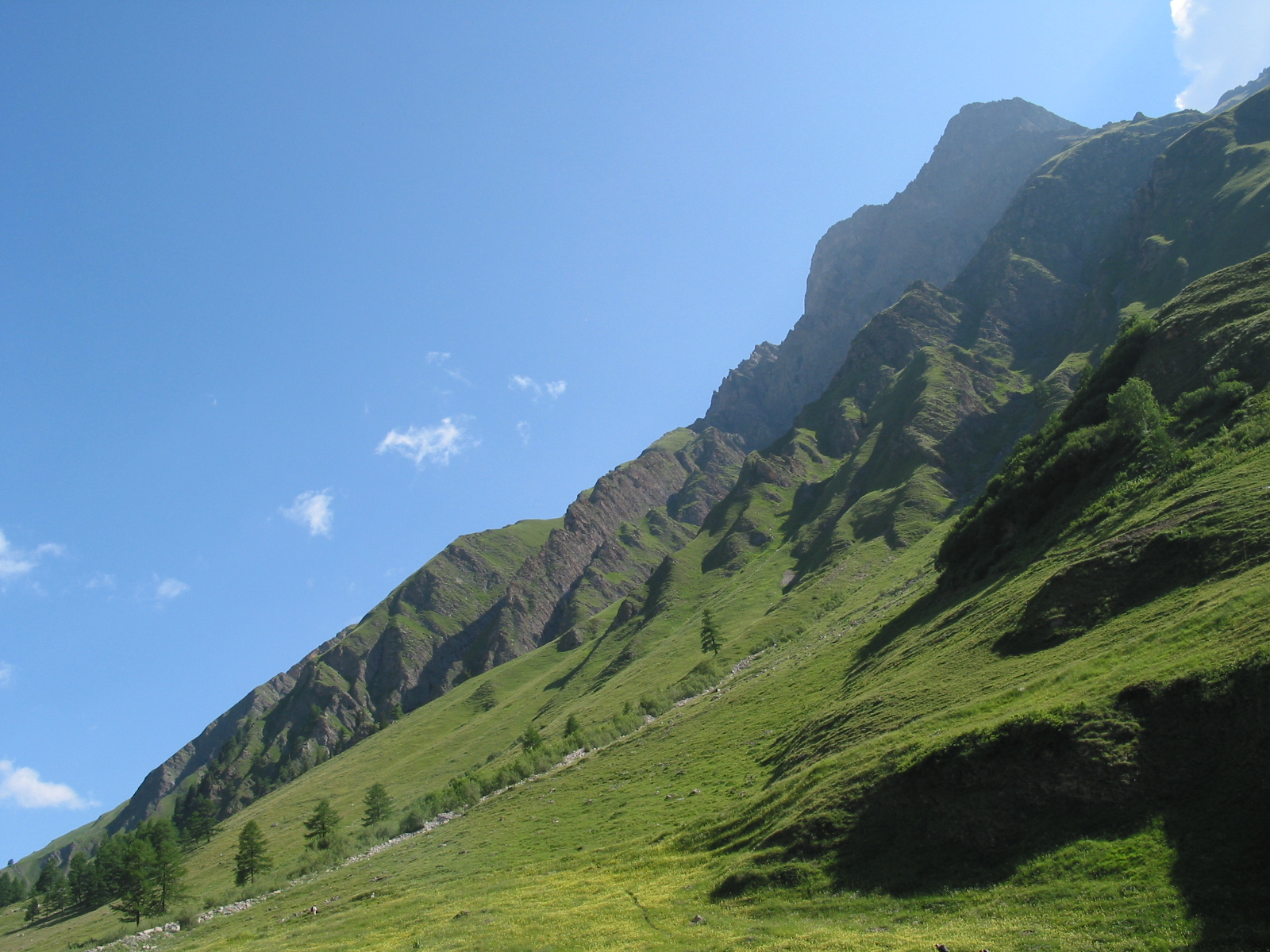
Southeastern slopes of the Swiss Val Ferret, near the village of Ferret.

Val Ferret is the name shared by two valleys separated by the Col Ferret, a pass on the border between Italy and Switzerland. The valleys lie southeast of Mont Blanc Massif. The Swiss valley drains northeast towards Orsières and on into the Rhône basin; whereas the Italian valley drains southwest towards Courmayeur and on into the Po basin.

The two valleys are connected by a mountain footpath through Col Ferret which forms part of the 170 kilometres (110 mi) circular Tour du Mont Blanc route. Access to Col Ferret is forbidden for private motor vehicles, on both sides.

== Swiss Val Ferret ==
The Swiss Val Ferret is a valley on the southern side of Rhône valley in the canton of Valais in Switzerland. It lies between the Mont Blanc Massif and the Pennine Alps, with the river La Dranse de Ferret running down the length of the valley from its source to La Dranse river.

=== Geography ===
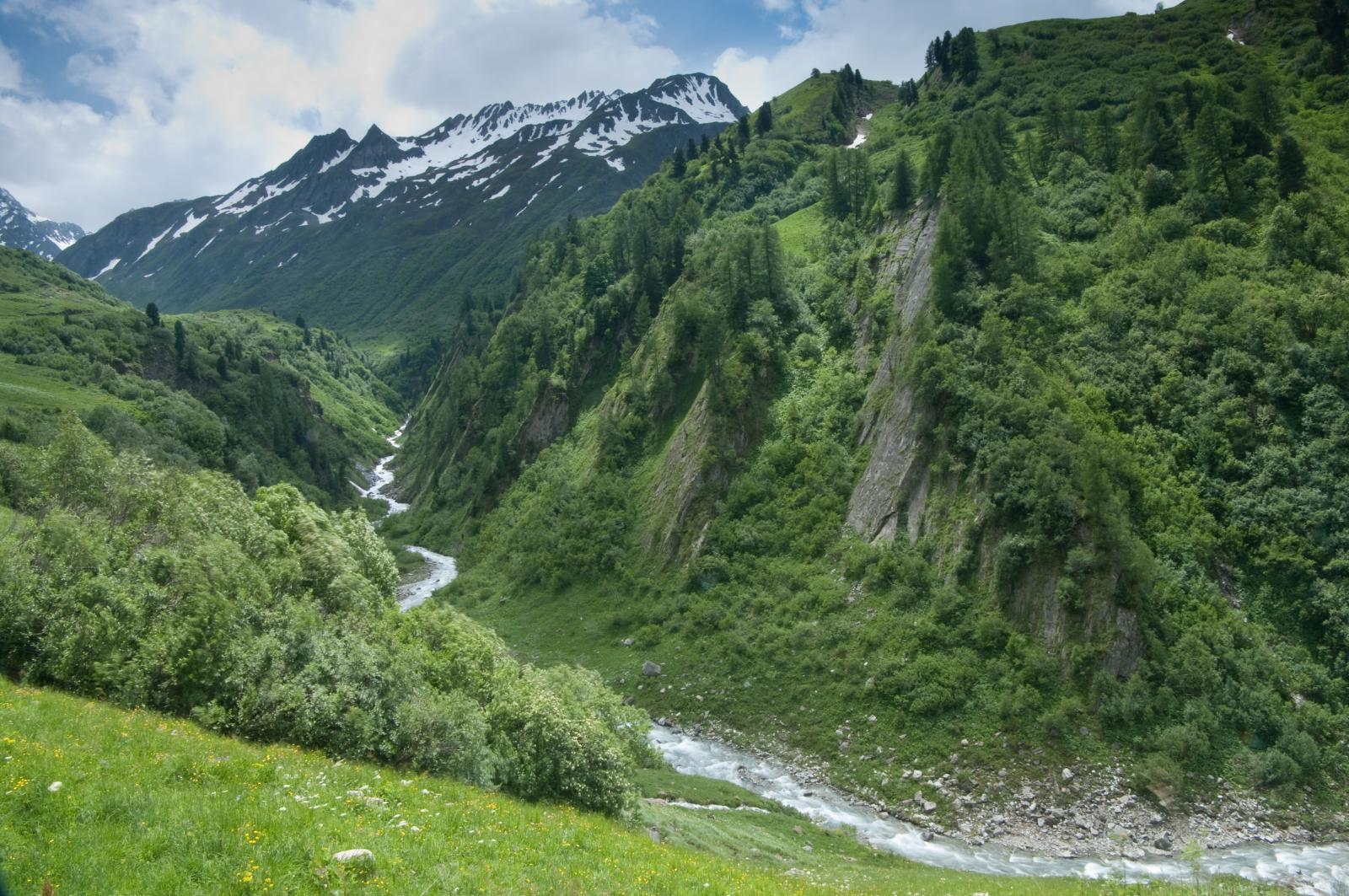
Dranse de Ferret

The valley starts at the Col Ferret (2490 m) on the Italian border. It is surrounded by high mountains, especially on the west side (Mont Dolent, Tour Noir and other summits of the Mont Blanc Massif).

The main villages of the Val Ferret are (descending from the pass): Ferret, La Fouly, Prayon, Praz de Fort, Issert and Som la Proz, all belonging to the municipality of Orsières. Altogether, the valley had approximately 700 inhabitants as at 2008).

== Italian Val Ferret ==
=== Geography ===
From the Col Ferret (the Swiss border), the valley runs down, beneath the Pré de Bar glacier and the towering Grandes Jorasses. The stream running through the valley is the Dora di Ferret (French: Doire de Ferret), which, near La Palud (in front of the Italian Mont Blanc Tunnel exit), joins the Dora di Veny (French: Doire de Veny) flowing down from Val Veny to form the Dora Baltea, a left-hand tributary of the Po. The main villages in the valley are Arnouvaz, Planpincieux and La Palud, all in the comune of Courmayeur.

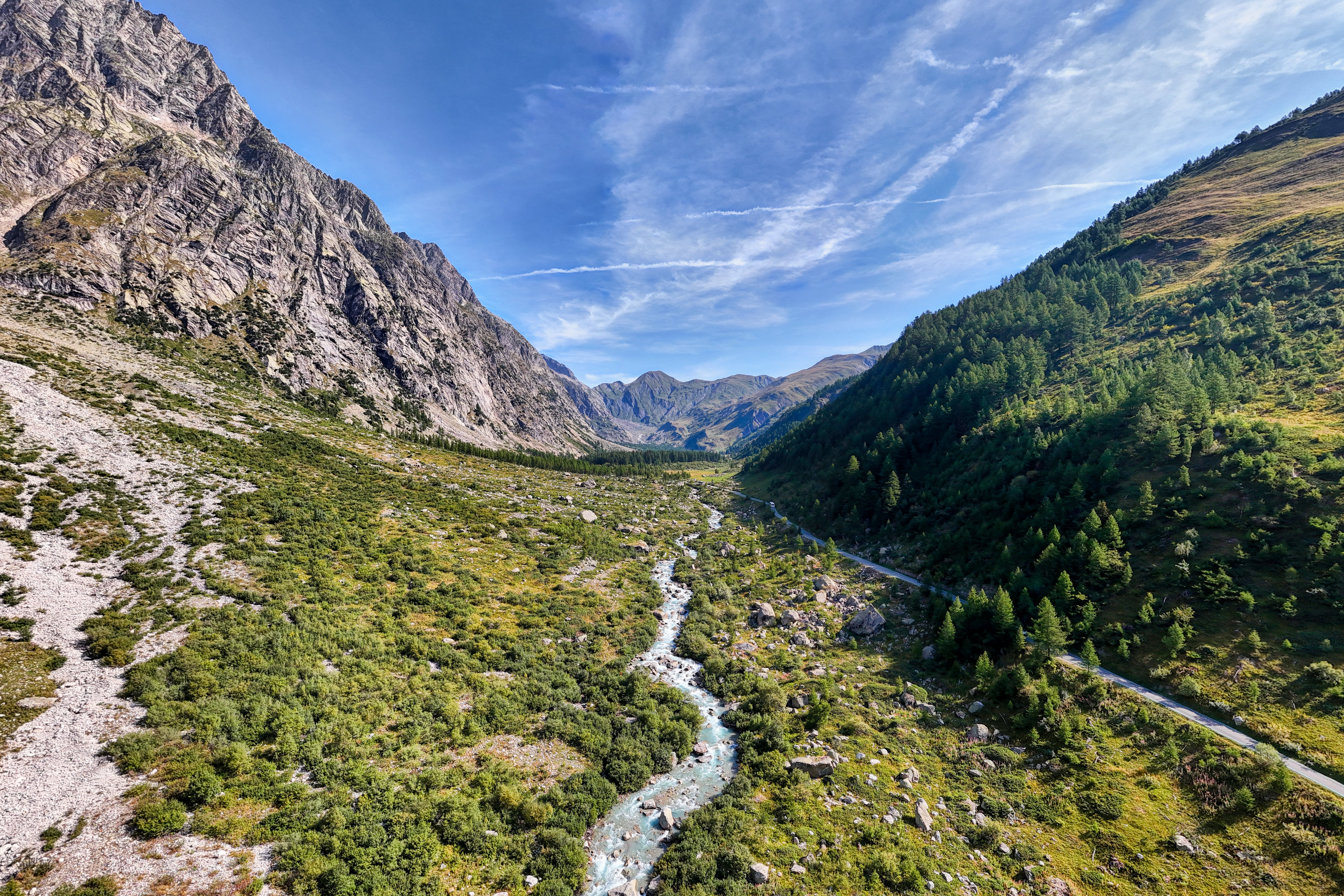
Upstream view of the Italian Val Ferret.

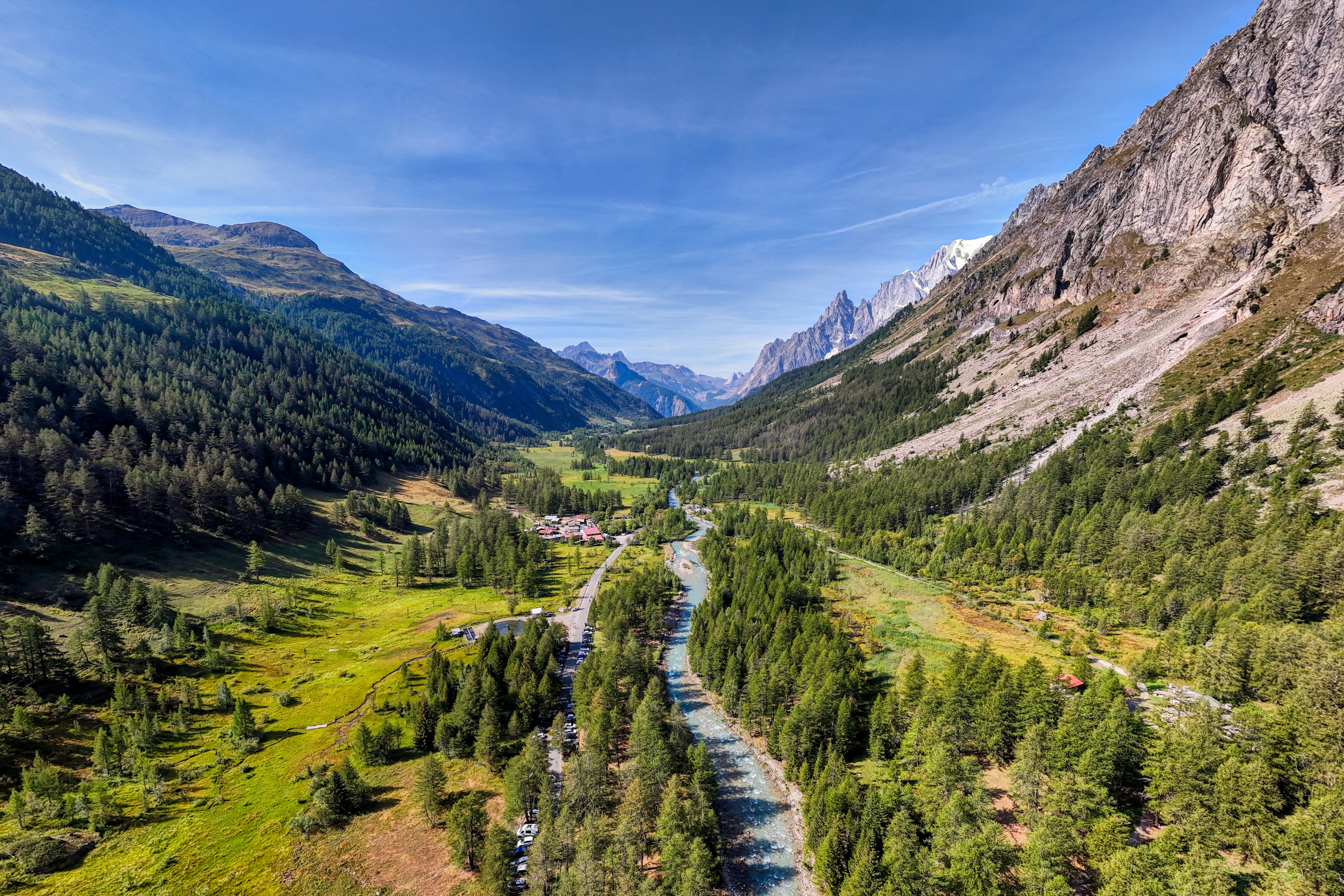
Downstream view of the Italian Val Ferret.

== Tourism ==
The valleys are mostly frequented by hikers on the route of the Tour du Mont Blanc. Many excursions are possible from the villages, such as: Cabane de l'A Neuve from La Fouly or Cabane de Saleina from Praz de Fort or Cabane du Trient above the Trient Glacier. La Fouly also serves as a waypoint on the Ultra-Trail du Mont-Blanc (UTMB) route.
