= La Fouly =

Village in Val Ferret in the Swiss canton of Valais

Coordinates: 45°56′N 7°05′E

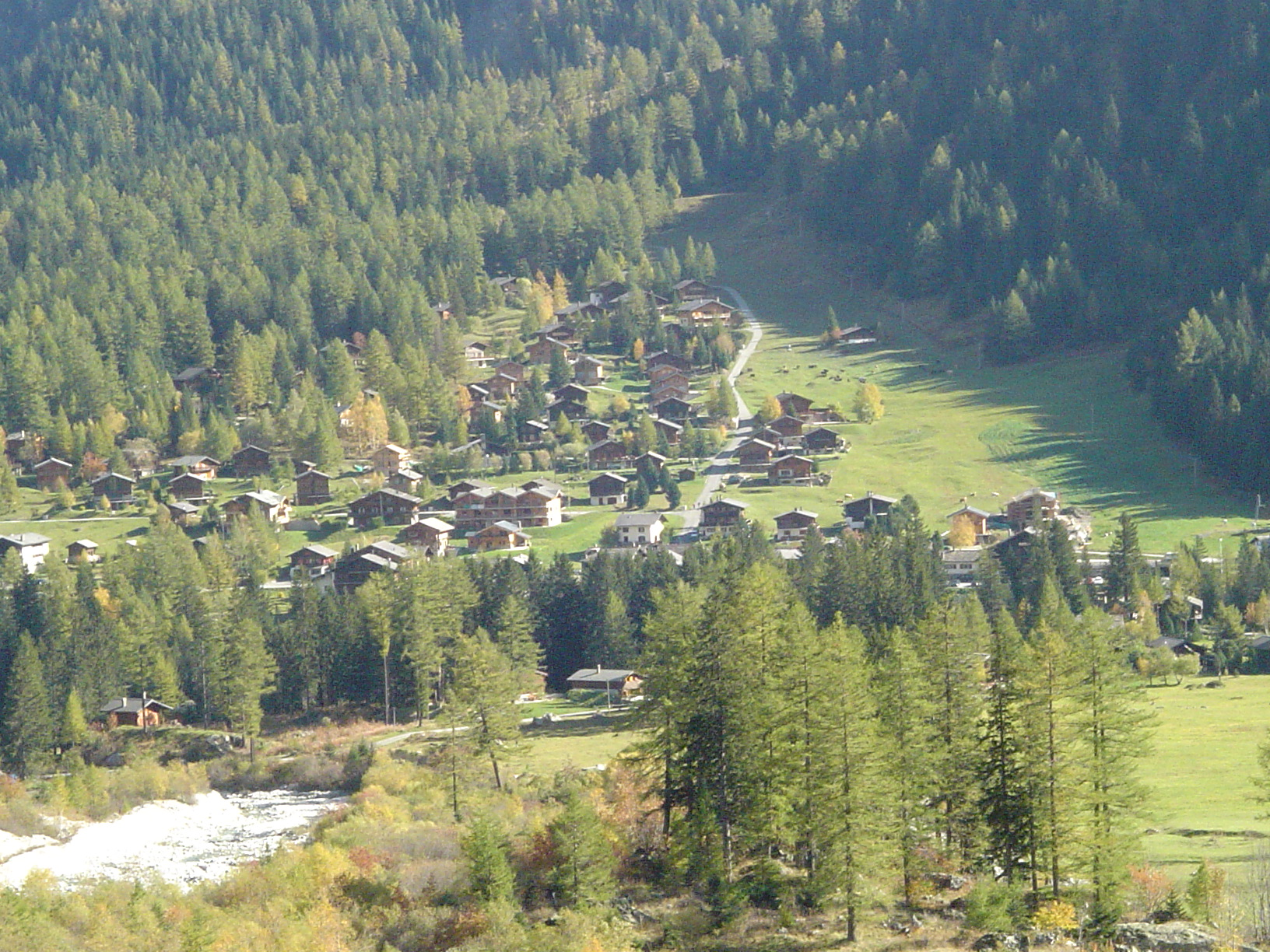
La Fouly

La Fouly is a village in Val Ferret in the Swiss canton of Valais. At an altitude of 1,600 metres, it is part of the municipality of Orsières (900 m). It sits at the foot of Mont Dolent (3,823 m) and the Tour Noir (3,836m) in the Mont Blanc massif.

La Fouly is a starting point for many hikes into the surrounding mountains and is also a small ski resort. It is also often used as a stopping place for the Tour du Mont Blanc, and is a stage of the Ultra-Trail du Mont-Blanc.

La Fouly is also a stop on the Ultra-Trail du Mont-Blanc (UTMB) route. The area offers activities such as rock climbing, via ferrata, ski mountaineering, and cross-country skiing. Across from the village lie the A Neuve and Dolent glaciers. The region’s alpine pasture tradition (the high-altitude grazing season) is listed as part of UNESCO’s Intangible Cultural Heritage.
