= Tour Noir =

Mountain in the Mont Blanc massif on the Swiss-French border

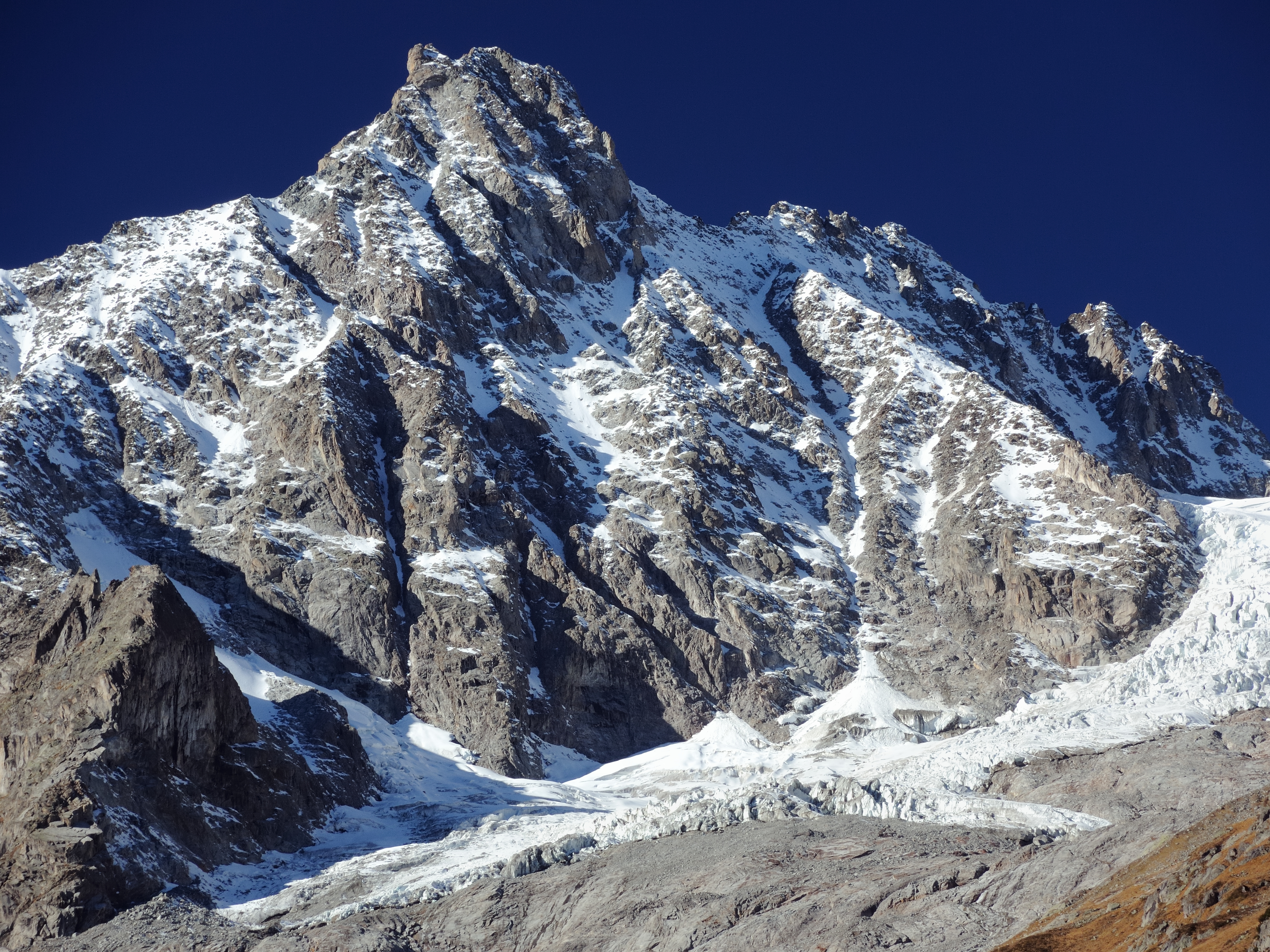
- Tour Noir from Val Ferret

Highest point
- Elevation: 3,836 m (12,585 ft)
- Prominence: 302 m (991 ft)
- Parent peak: Aiguille d'Argentière
- Listing: Alpine mountains above 3000 m
- Coordinates: 45°57′1.1″N 7°2′12.3″E

Geography
- Location within Alps
- Location: Valais, Switzerland; Haute-Savoie, France
- Parent range: Mont Blanc Massif

The Tour Noir is a mountain in the Mont Blanc massif on the Swiss-French border. It is located between the Aiguille d'Argentière and Mont Dolent.

== See also ==
- List of mountains of Switzerland
