= Saleina Glacier =

Glacier on the Mont Blanc Massif

Coordinates: 45°58′19″N 7°1′48″E

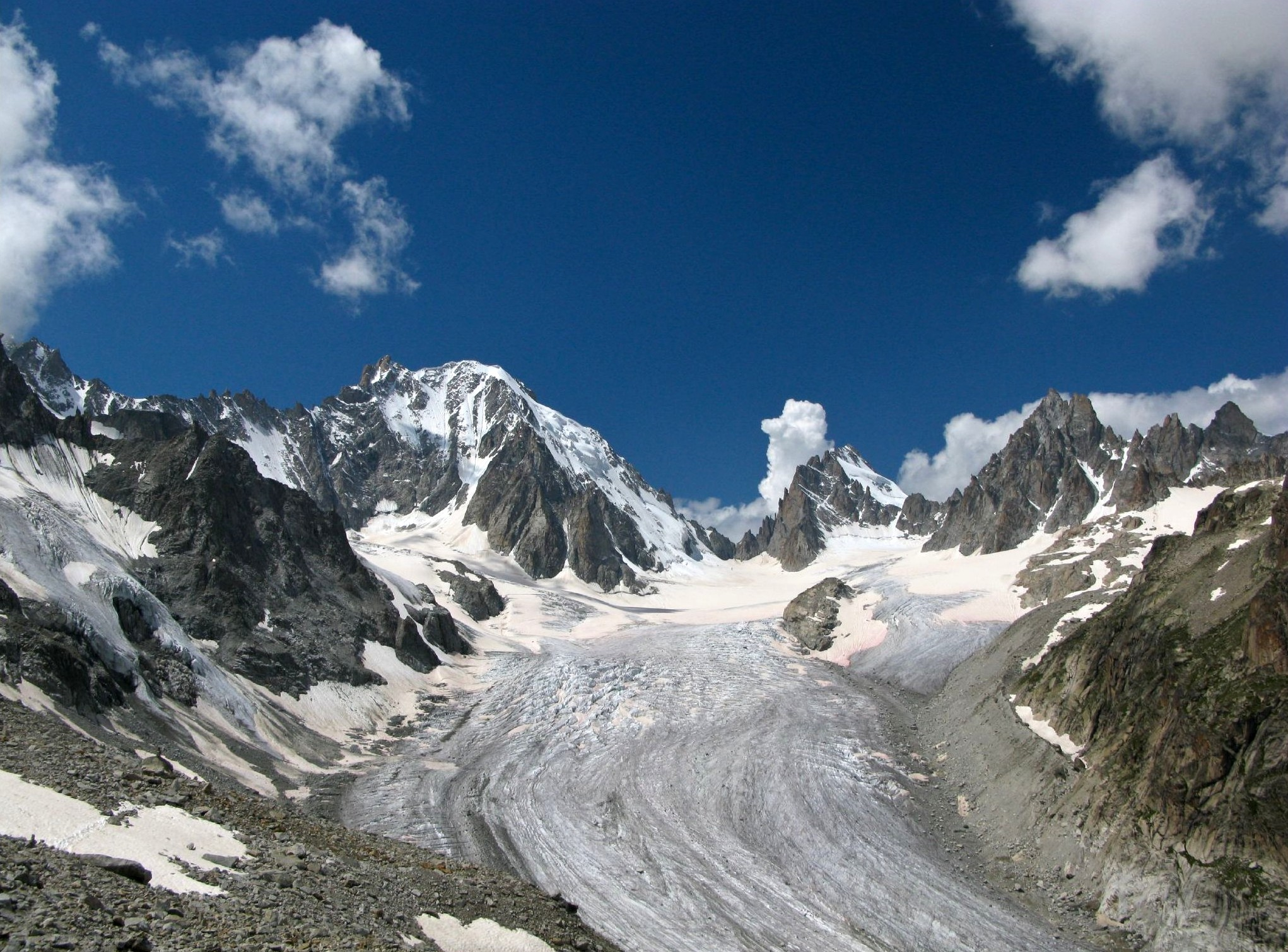
Saleina Glacier with the Aiguille d'Argentière on the left

The Saleina Glacier (French: Glacier de saleina, formerly spelled Saleinaz) is a 6 km (3.7 mi) long glacier (2002) situated on the north-eastern edge of the Mont Blanc Massif in the canton of Valais in Switzerland. It flows in a roughly north-easterly direction from the Aiguille d'Argentière, down towards the Val Ferret. The Saleina Hut sits above its right bank at an altitude of 2,691 meters above sea level.

== See also ==
- List of glaciers in Switzerland
- List of glaciers
- Retreat of glaciers since 1850
- Swiss Alps
