= Tour du Mont Blanc =

Long distance walk in Europe

- Length: 165 kilometres (103 miles)
- Location: France, Italy, Switzerland
- Use: Hiking
- Elevation gain/loss: 10,600 m (34,777 ft)
- Difficulty: Difficult

Map overview
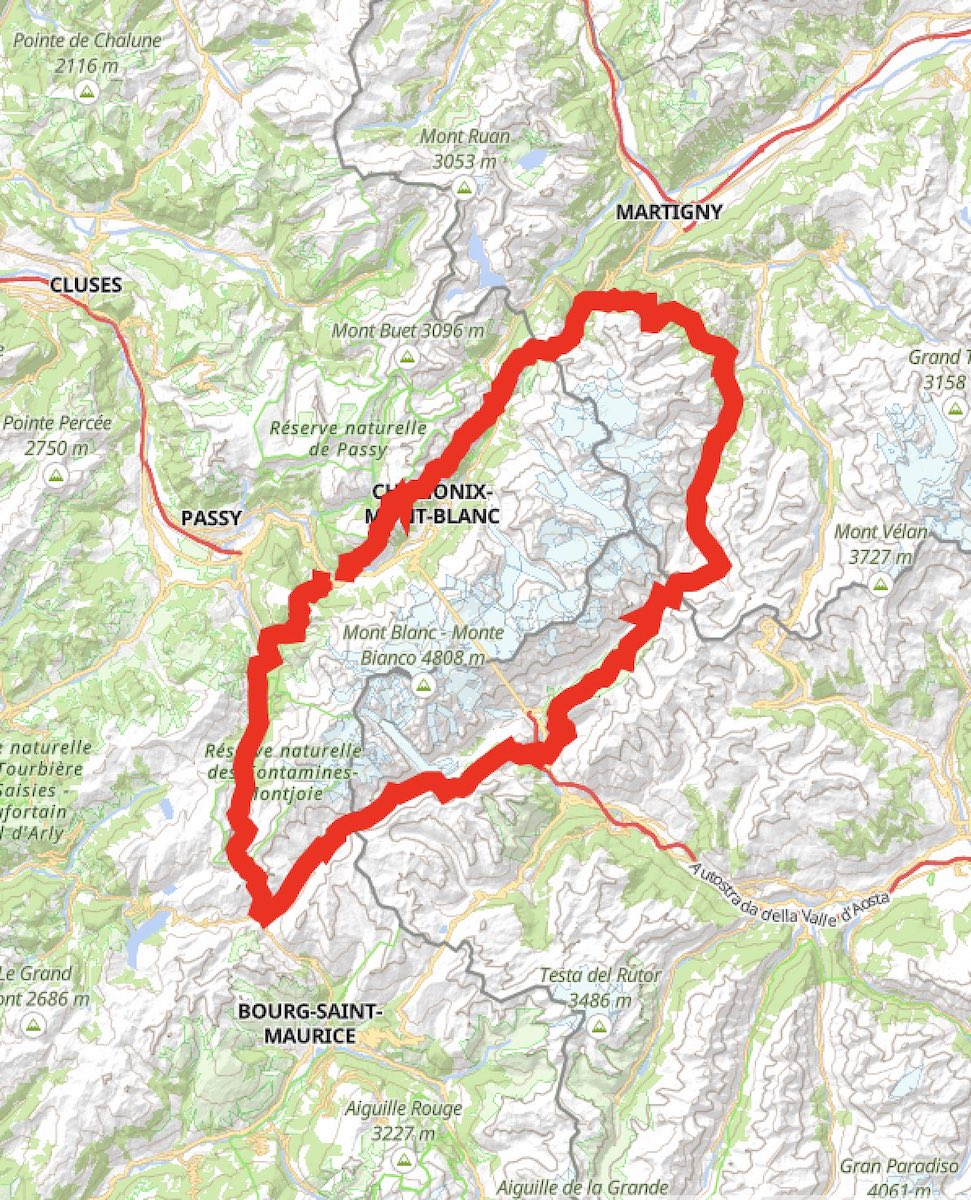

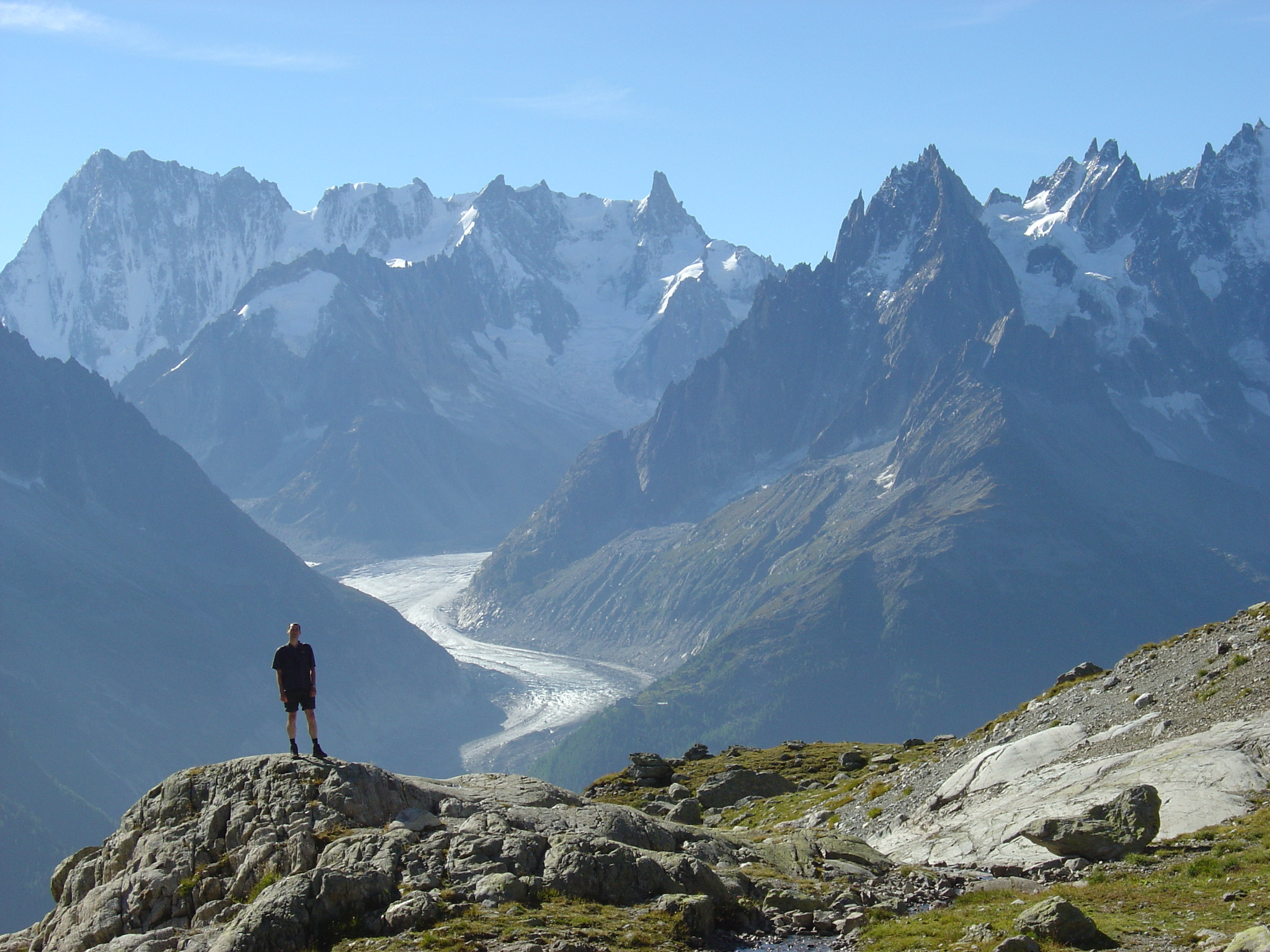
Mt Blanc Massif from the French side of the Tour du Mont Blanc

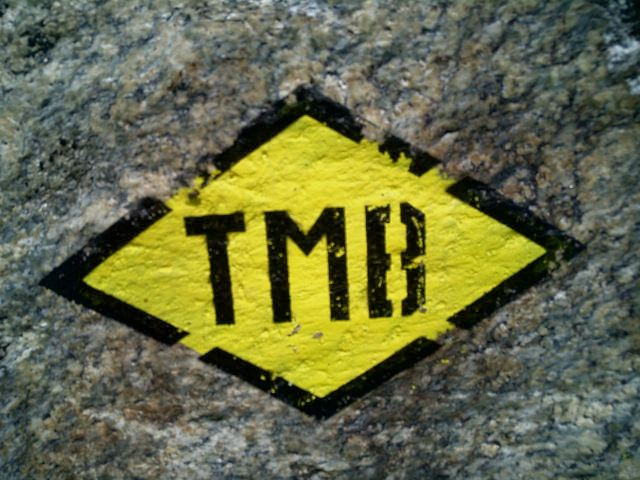
The official TMB sign

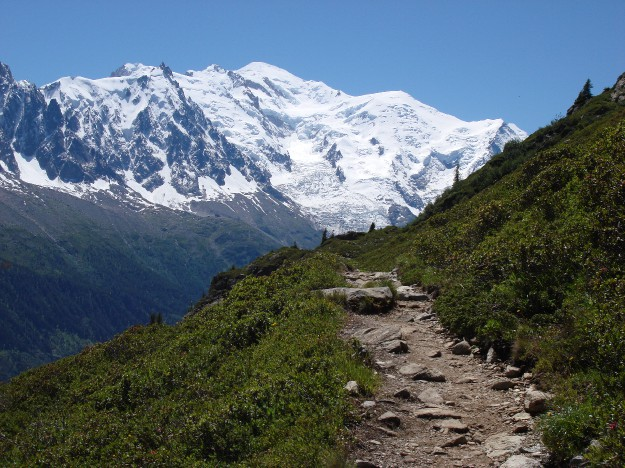
Mont Blanc from the TMB, Aiguilles Rouges

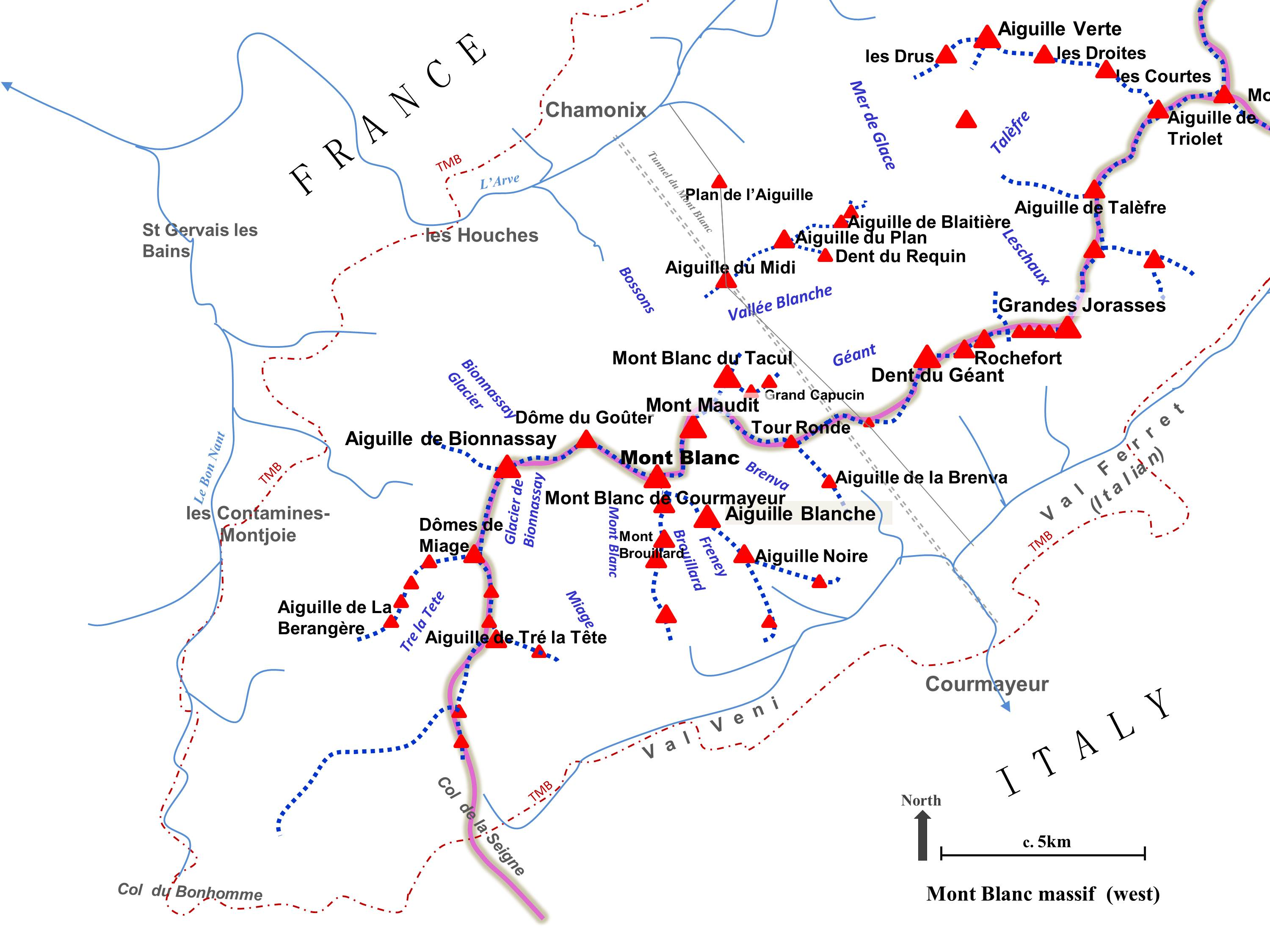
Mont Blanc massif (west). TMB route shown dotted

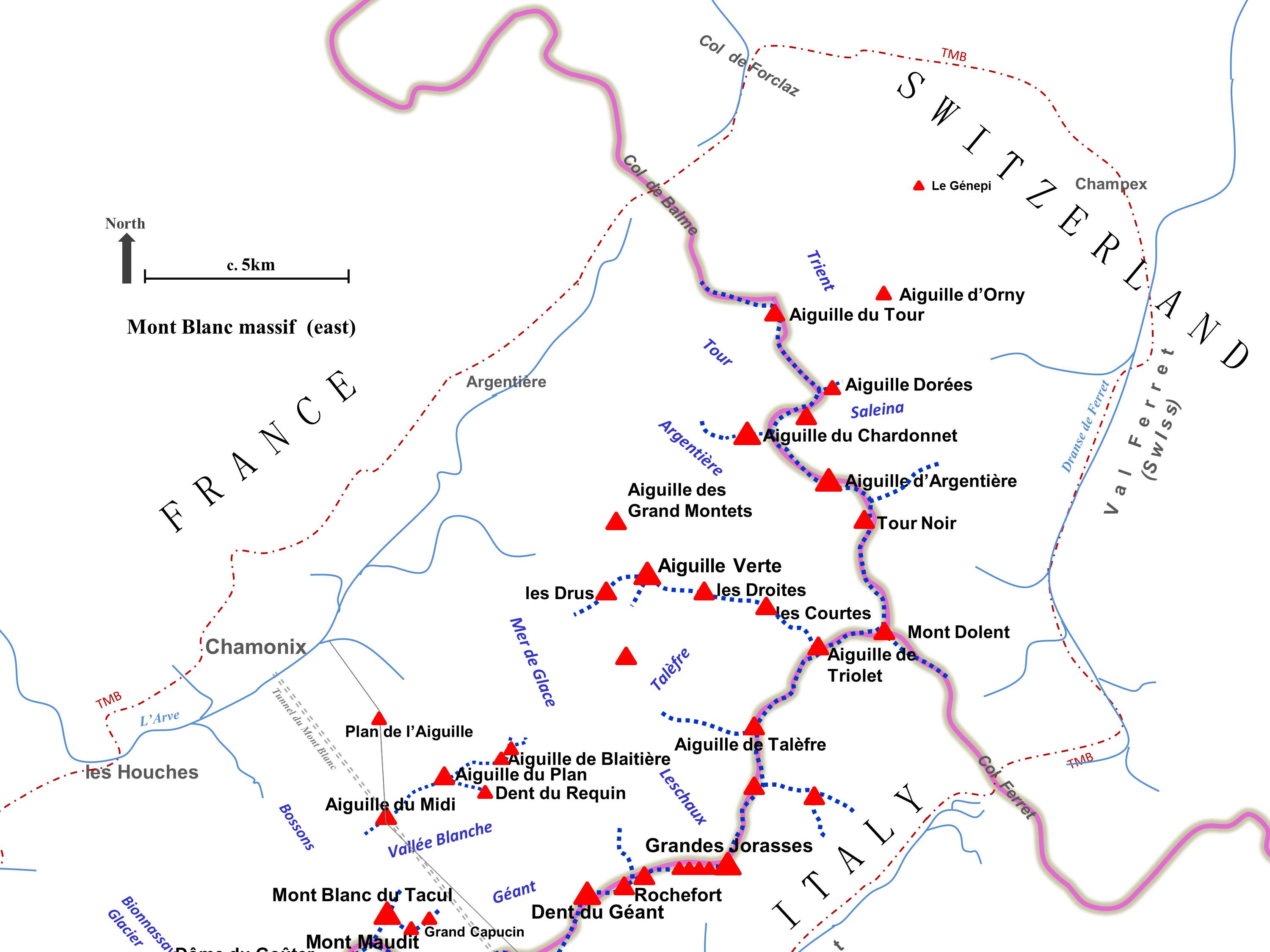
Mont Blanc massif (east)

The Tour du Mont Blanc or TMB is one of the most popular long-distance walks in Europe. It circles the Mont Blanc massif, covering a distance of roughly 165 kilometres (103 mi) with 10 kilometres (6.2 mi) of ascent/descent and passing through parts of Switzerland, Italy and France.

It is considered one of the classic long-distance hiking trails. The circular route is normally walked in a counter-clockwise direction in 9-14 days. It is also the route of an annual ultramarathon, the Ultra-Trail du Mont-Blanc, which covers the entire distance at once with a time limit of 46 hours and 30 minutes.

== Route ==
Usual start points are Les Houches in the Chamonix valley or Les Contamines in the Montjoie valley (in France), Courmayeur from the Italian side, and either Champex or a point near Martigny in Switzerland. The route passes through seven valleys around the Mont-Blanc massif, an anti-clockwise start in Chamonix would lead through the Chamonix (or Arve) valley, then Montjoie, Vallée des Glaciers, Italian Val Veni, Val Ferret, Swiss Val Ferret, and either the Arpette or Trient valley in Switzerland, dependent on the route chosen.

The "official" route has changed over the course of the years and many alternatives, or "variantes", exist to the standard route. Some can take an intrepid walker onto paths requiring greater fitness, awareness and skill. Others provide less demanding options, which are often quicker than the accepted route, but provide lesser viewpoints onto the mountain ranges. For a part of the way, between the summit of Brevent and the Col de la Croix du Bonhomme, the route coincides with the European long-distance footpath GR5 as it makes its way from the North Sea to the Mediterranean Sea. A link can also be made with the walkers' Haute Route from Chamonix to Zermatt in the Swiss Alps.

The highest points on any variant of the trail are the Col des Fours in France and the Fenêtre d'Arpette in Switzerland, both at an altitude of 2,665 m (8,743 ft). This altitude is not high enough to cause altitude sickness for most people, nevertheless the trail provides a physical challenge. Experience of walking in mountain country is vital and, because mountain weather can change very rapidly, participants on the Tour du Mont Blanc should be suitably equipped with appropriate gear.

Plentiful accommodation exists along the entire route, allowing it to be broken into segments to suit any fit person. This takes a variety of forms, from separate bedrooms to large mixed-sex dormitories. Cooked meals are available at most. With a start at Les Houches one might expect overnight stops at Les Contamines, Col de la Croix du Bonhomme refuge or Les Chapieux (depending on variant route taken), Elisabetta Soldini refuge, Courmayeur, Elena refuge, Champex, Trient village, Argentiere, La Flegere refuge and finally back to Les Houches. Despite the abundance of choice, the popularity of the trail can lead to problems finding accommodation, even if booking in advance.

=== Legs ===
| Leg# | Start | Destination | Distance | Hours | Ascent Meter | Descent Meter | Difference |
|---|---|---|---|---|---|---|---|
| 1 | Les Houches | Les Contamines | 16 km | 5:00 | 646 m | 633 m | + 13 m |
| 2 | Les Contamines | Les Chapieux | 18 km | 7:30 | 1316 m | 929 m | + 387 m |
| 3 | Les Chapieux | Rifugio Elisabetta | 15 km | 4:30 | 1004 m | 258 m | + 746 m |
| 4 | Rifugio Elisabetta | Courmayeur | 18 km | 5:00 | 460 m | 1560 m | 1100 m |
| 5 | Courmayeur | Rifugio Bonatti | 12 km | 4:30 | 860 m | 101 m | + 759 m |
| 6 | Rifugio Bonatti | La Fouly | 20 km | 6:30 | 895 m | 1410 m | 515 m |
| 7 | La Fouly | Champex | 15 km | 4:00 | 420 m | 565 m | 145 m |
| 8 | Champex | Col de la Forclaz | 16 km | 4:30 | 742 m | 682 m | + 60 m |
| 9 | Col de la Forclaz | Tre-le-Champ | 13 km | 5:30 | 1069 m | 1178 m | 109 m |
| 10 | Tre-le-Champ | Refuge Flegere | 8 km | 3:30 | 733 m | 257 m | + 476 m |
| 11 | Refuge Flegere | Les Houches | 17 km | 6:30 | 772 m | 1546 m | 774 m |
| Total: | | | 168 km | 57h | 8,917 m | 9,119 m | 202 m |

== Ultramarathon ==
The route of the Tour du Mont Blanc is used for an annual ultramarathon called the Ultra-Trail du Mont-Blanc (UTMB). The winning time to complete the entire circuit ranges from around 18 hours for the men to 22 hours for the women.
