= Mont Dolent =

Mountain in the Mont Blanc massif

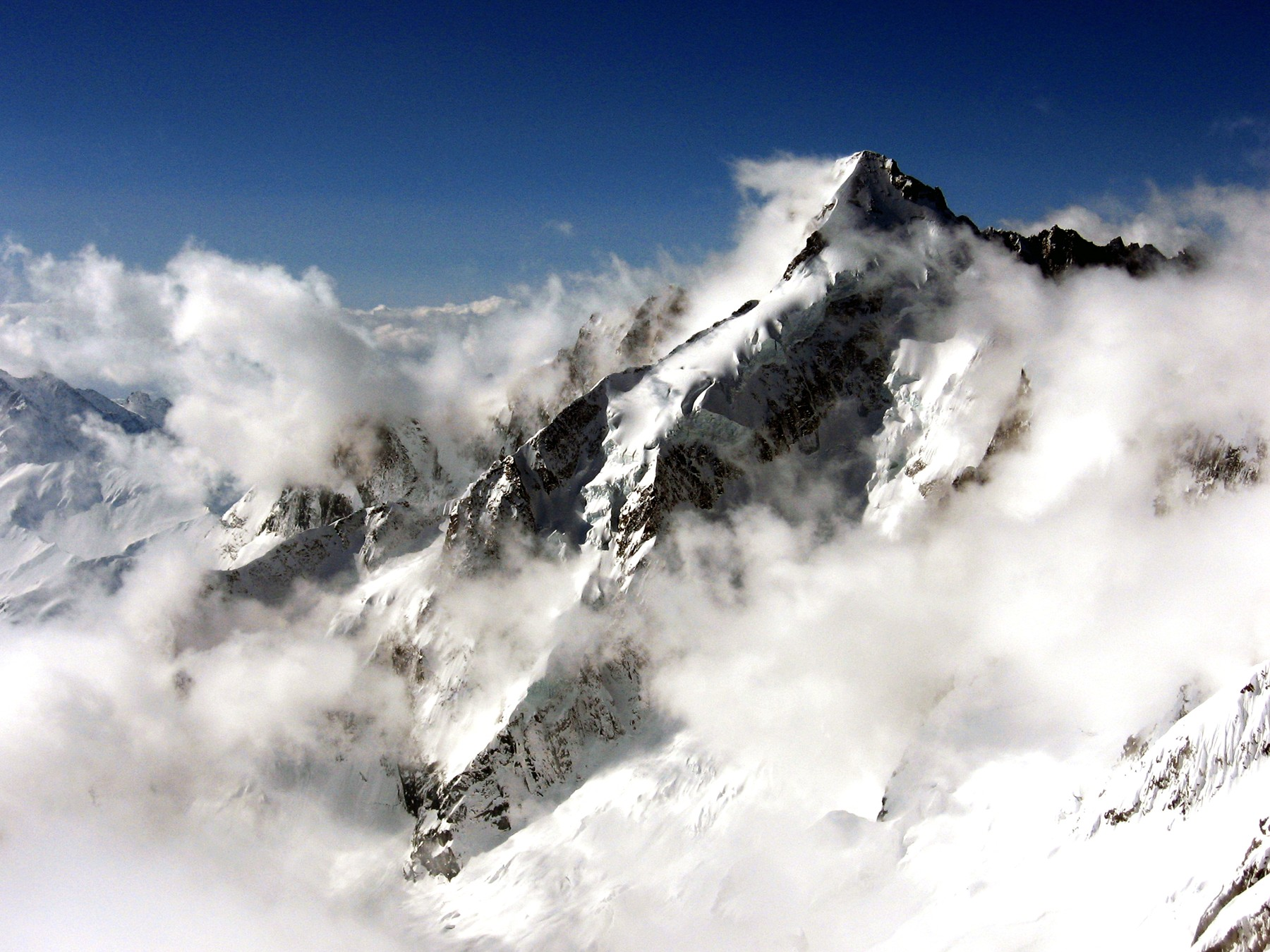
- Mont Dolent

Highest point
- Elevation: 3,823 m (12,543 ft)
- Prominence: 330 m (1,080 ft)
- Parent peak: Aiguille Verte
- Listing: Alpine mountains above 3000 m
- Coordinates: 45°55′21″N 7°2′46″E

Geography
- Location within Alps
- Location: Aosta Valley, Italy; Valais, Switzerland; Haute-Savoie, France
- Parent range: Graian Alps

Climbing
- First ascent: 9 July 1864 by A. Reilly, Edward Whymper, Michel Croz, H. Charlet and M. Payot
- Easiest route: South face and south-east ridge (PD)

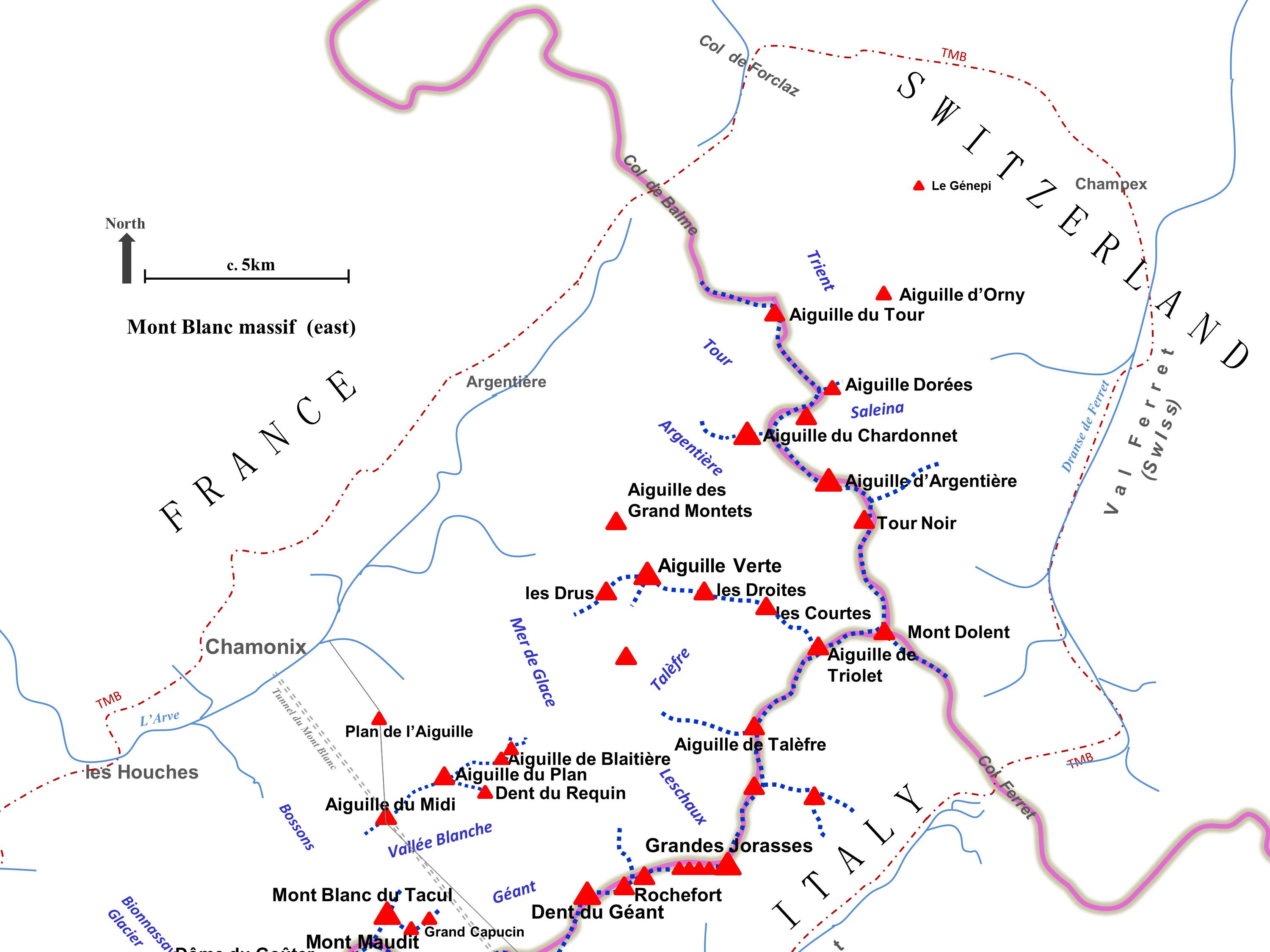
Mont Blanc massif (east) showing Mont Dolent on the boundary between three nations

Mont Dolent (3,823 metres (12,543 ft)) is a mountain in the Mont Blanc massif and lies on the border between Italy, Switzerland and France.

As a mountain, Mont Dolent is regarded as the tripoint between Italy, Switzerland and France, although the tripoint itself lies at 3,749 metres, less than 100 metres north-west of its summit.

In 1954, a statue of the Virgin Mary was erected on Mont Dolent's summit by the young people of Valais.

== Routes ==
The first ascent of the mountain was made on 9 July 1864 by A. Reilly and Edward Whymper with guides Michel Croz, H. Charlet and M. Payot. Whymper described the ascent in Scrambles amongst the Alps:

We occupied the 9th with a scramble up Mont Dolent. This was a miniature ascent. It contained a little of everything. First we went up to the Petit Col Ferret, and had a little grind over shaly banks; then there was a little walk over grass; then a little tramp over a moraine (which, strange to say, gave a pleasant path); then a little zigzagging over the snow-covered glacier of Mont Dolent. Then there was a little bergschrund, then a little wall of snow [. . .] The summit itself was little, very small indeed; it was the loveliest little cone of snow that was ever piled up on a mountain-top; so soft, so pure; it seemed a crime to defile it; it was a miniature Jungfrau; a toy summit, you could cover it with a hand.

Mont Dolent has four faces, offering good quality snow and ice climbs of various levels of difficulty. However the only straightforward route to the summit (graded PD) is on its southern flank via the Glacier de Pre de Bar, finishing along a short and exposed stretch of the south-east ridge. The Fiorio Bivouac Hut (also known as Refuge Bivouac du Dolent) provides the closest start point for this four-hour ascent from the Italian side. The next easiest route of ascent (graded AD) is via the mountain's east ridge, starting from the similarly named Bivouac du Dolent (la Maye) hut on its Swiss side.

== Huts ==
- Fiorio hut or Refuge Bivouac du Dolent – 2,724 m
- Bivouac du Dolent - la Maye – 2,667 m
- Cabane de l'A Neuve – 2,735 m
- Argentière Hut – 2,771 m

== Gallery ==
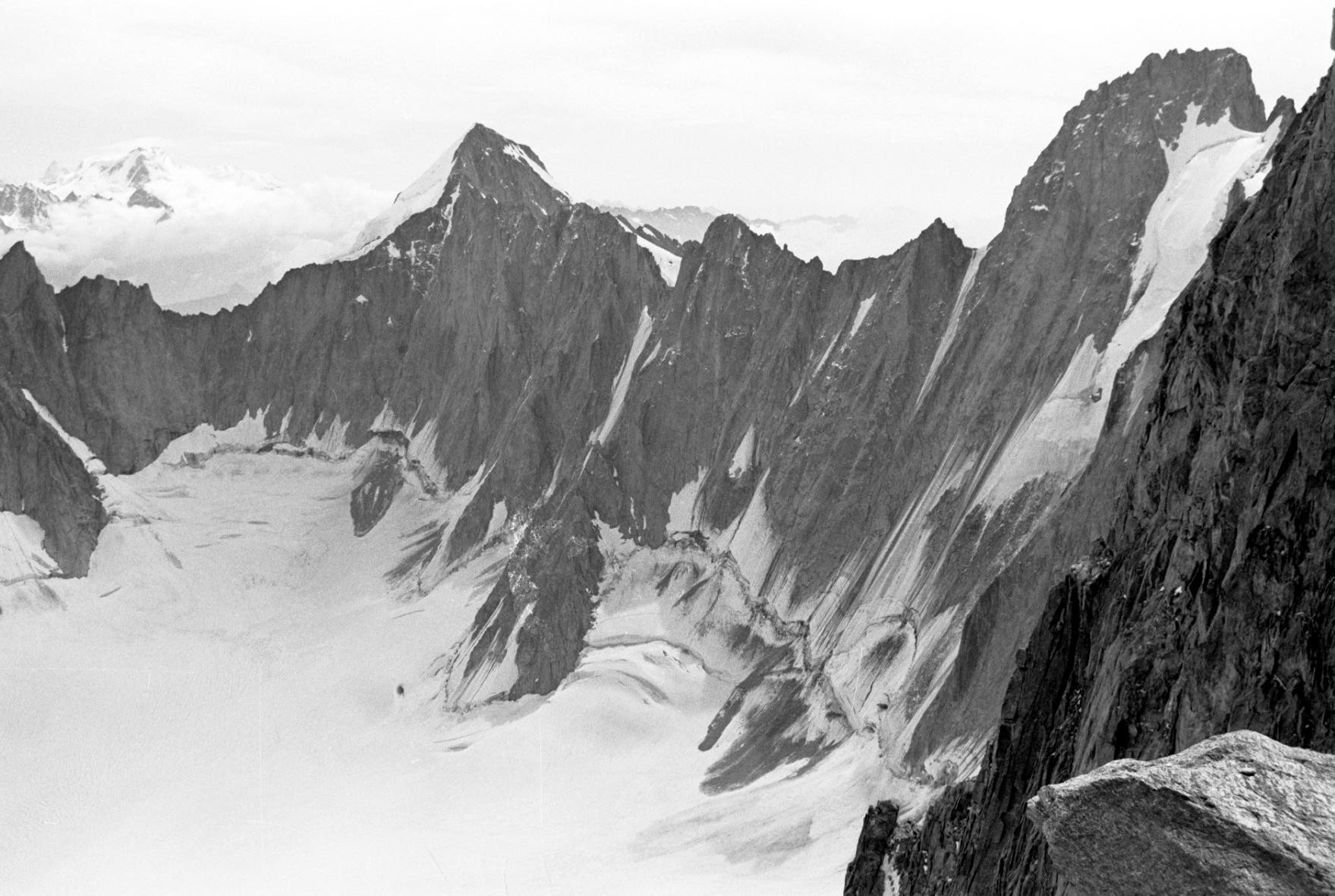
North side of Mont Dolent and Glacier d'Argentiere

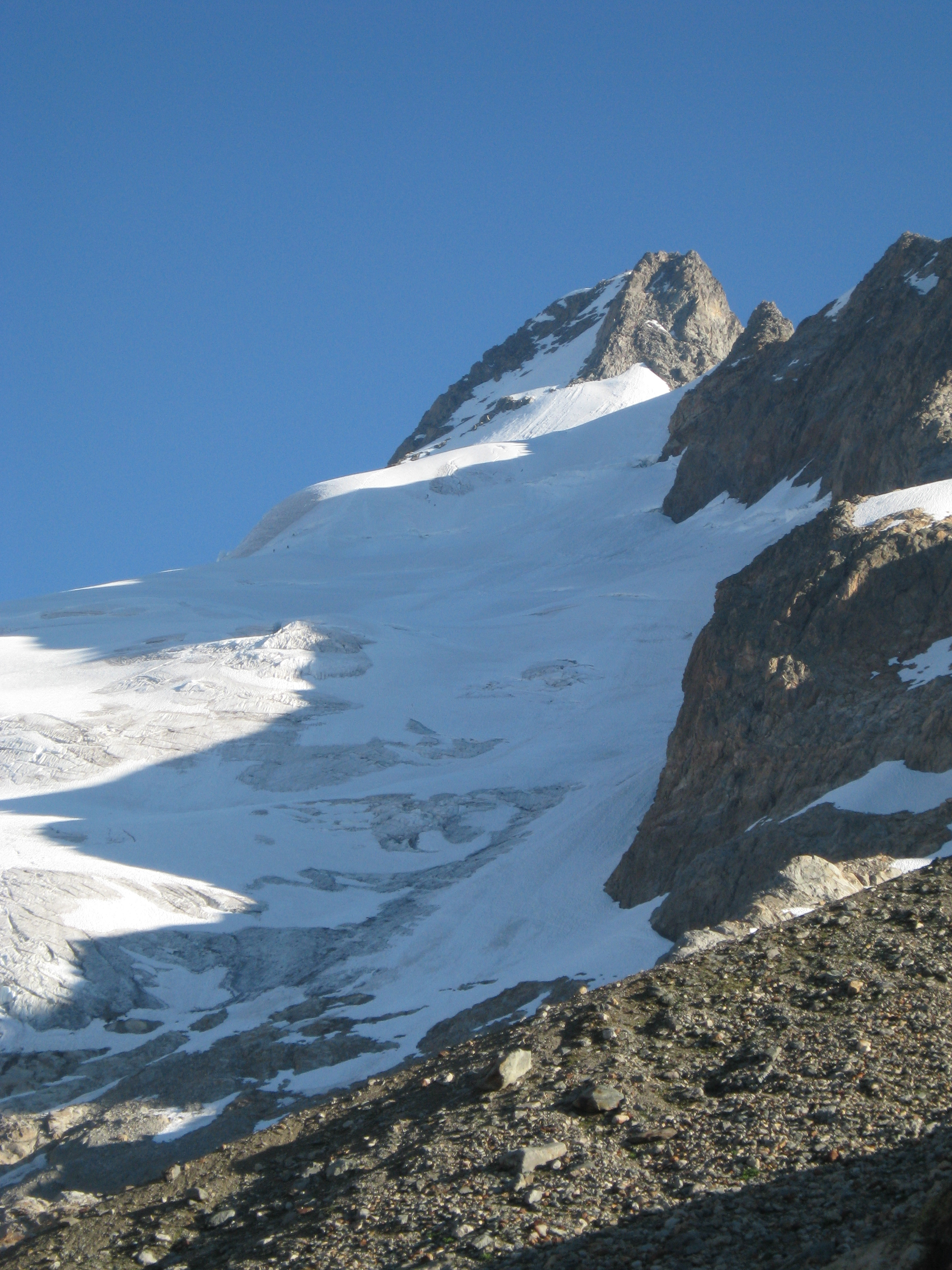
Southern side of Mont Dolent from Refuge Bivouac du Dolent

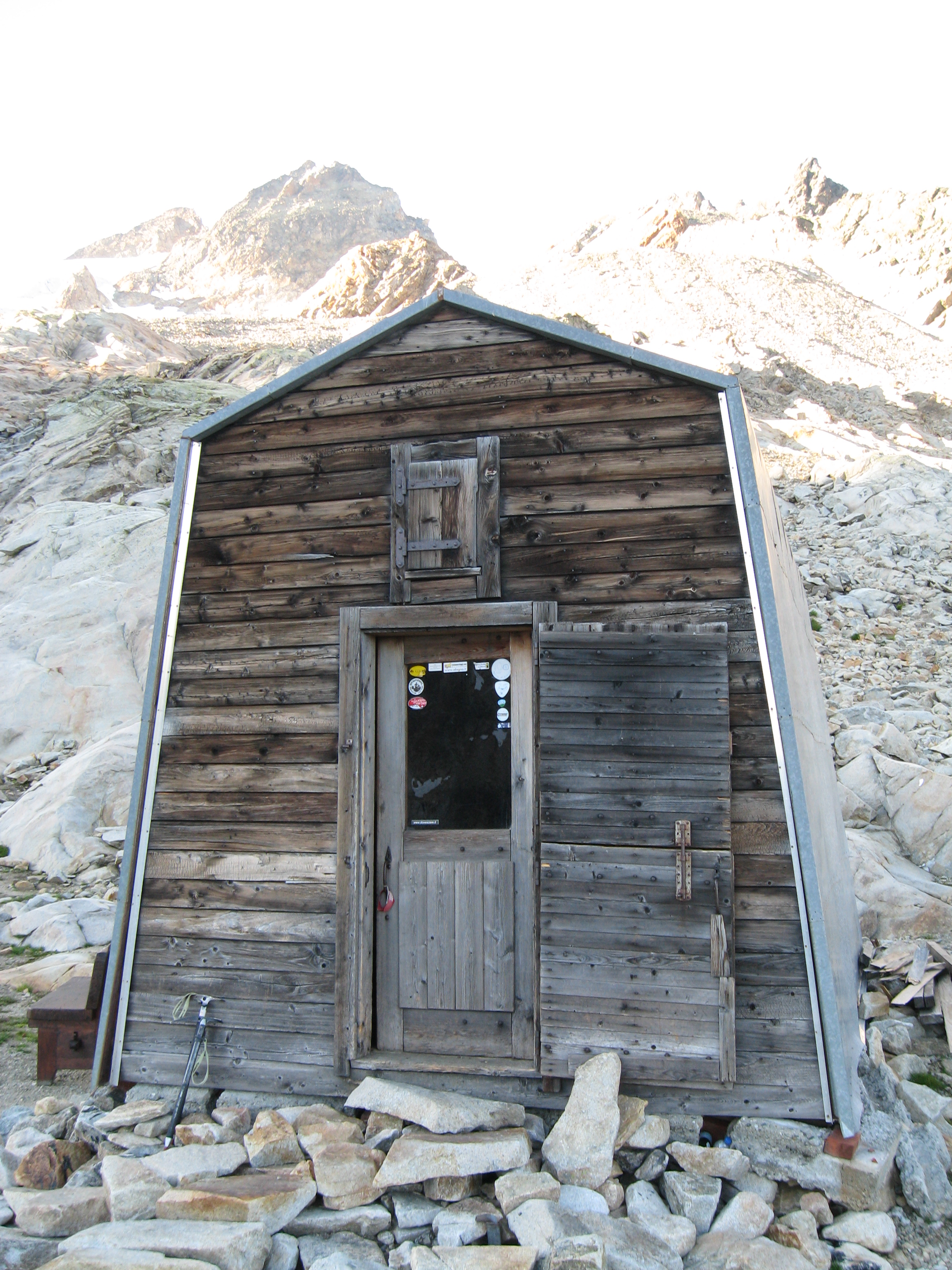
Refuge Bivouac du Dolent (Fiorio Refuge) on southern (Italian) side of the mountain

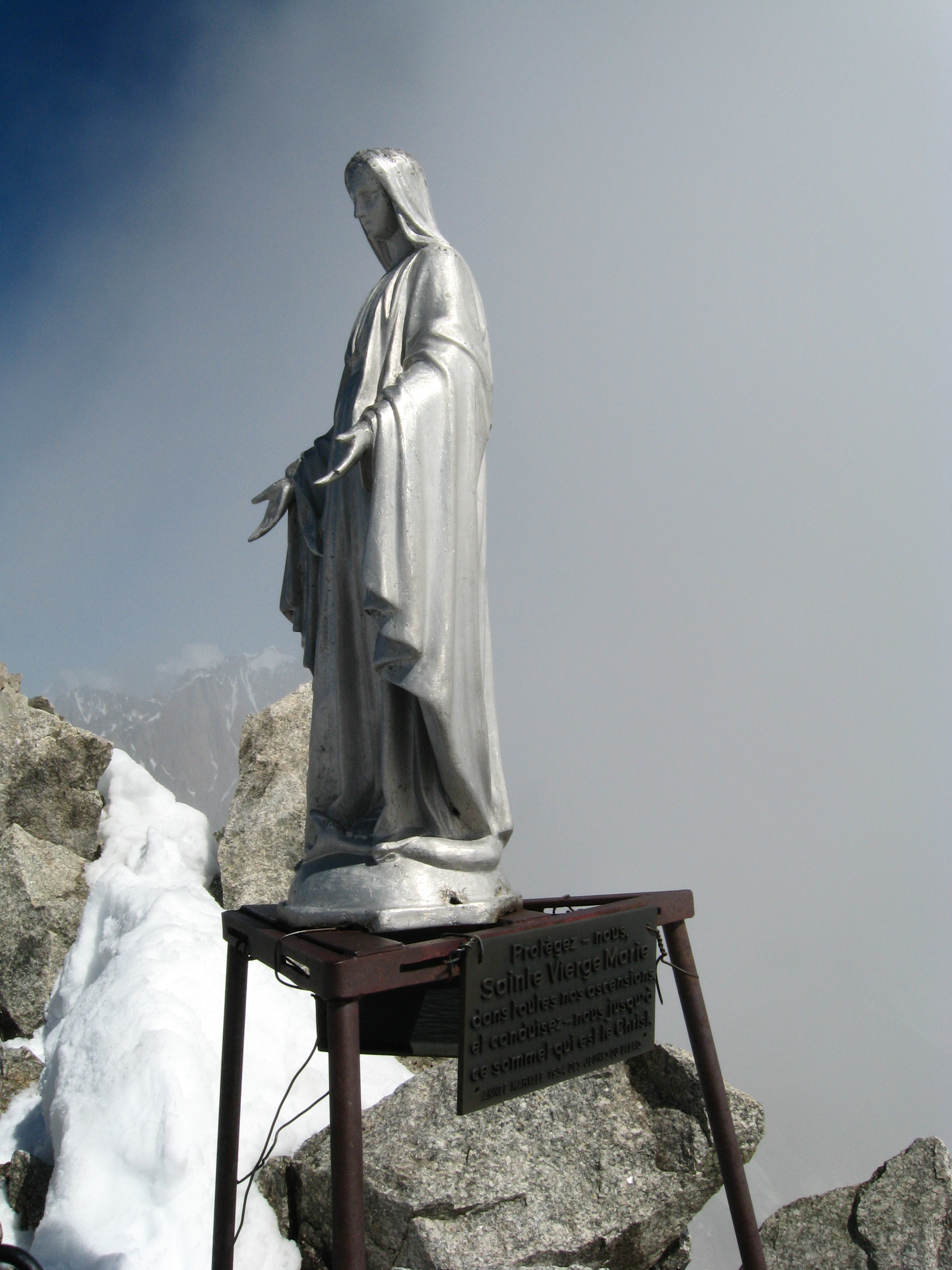
Mont Dolent summit statue, bearing inscription.

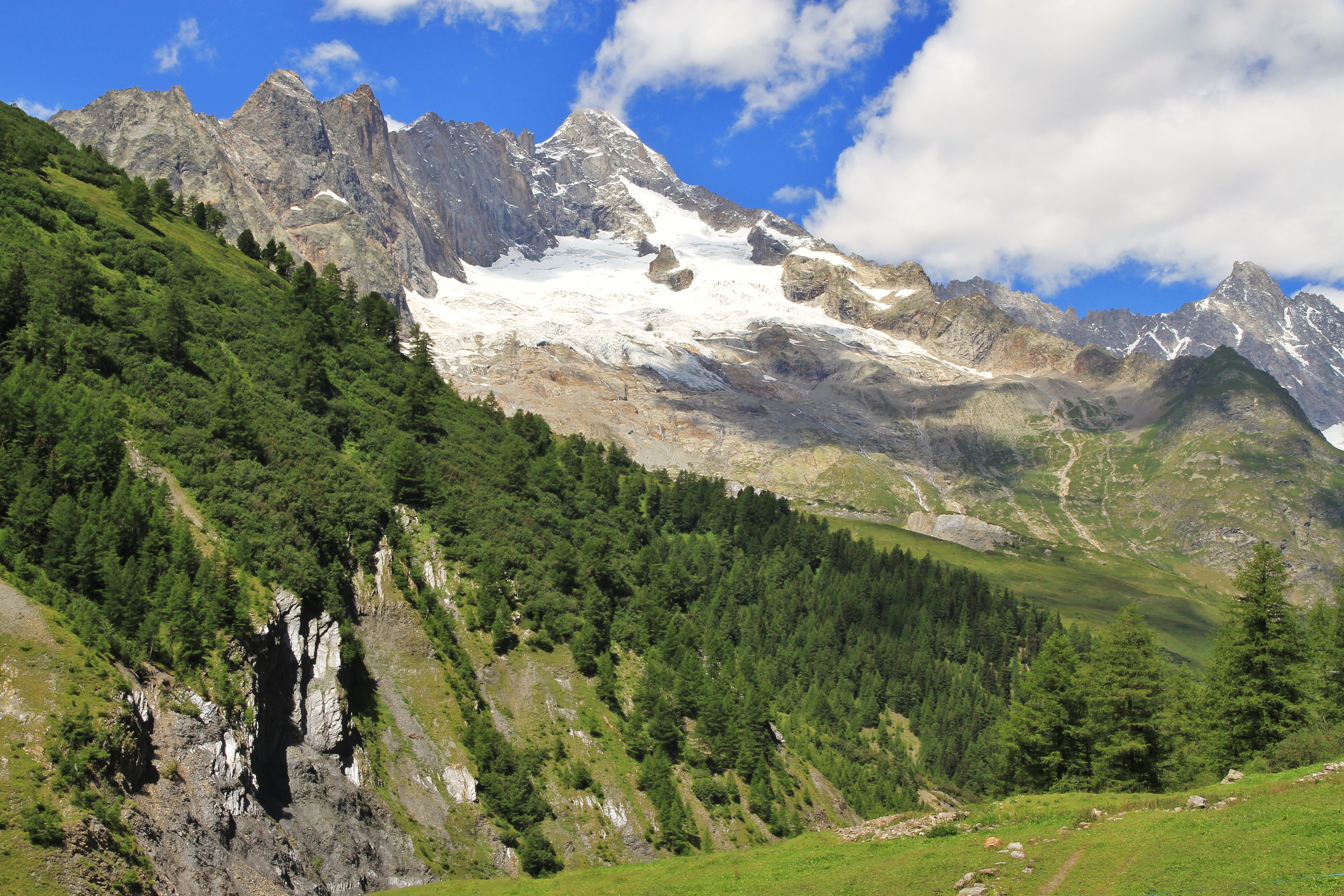
Mont Dolent from Val Ferret

== See also ==
- List of mountains of Switzerland
