= Argentière =

Village in the French Alps

Coordinates: 45°58′48″N 6°55′48″E

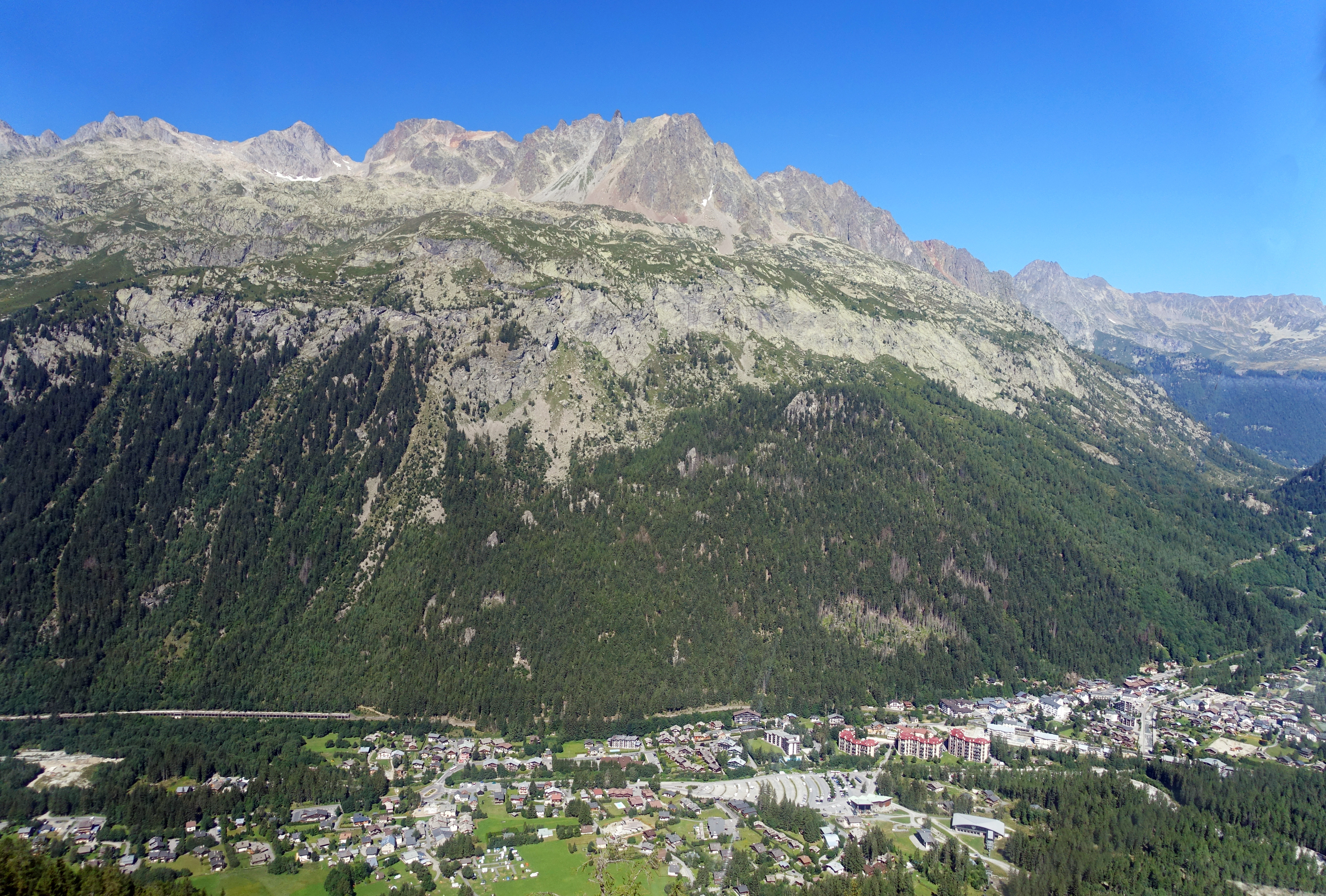
View of Argentière

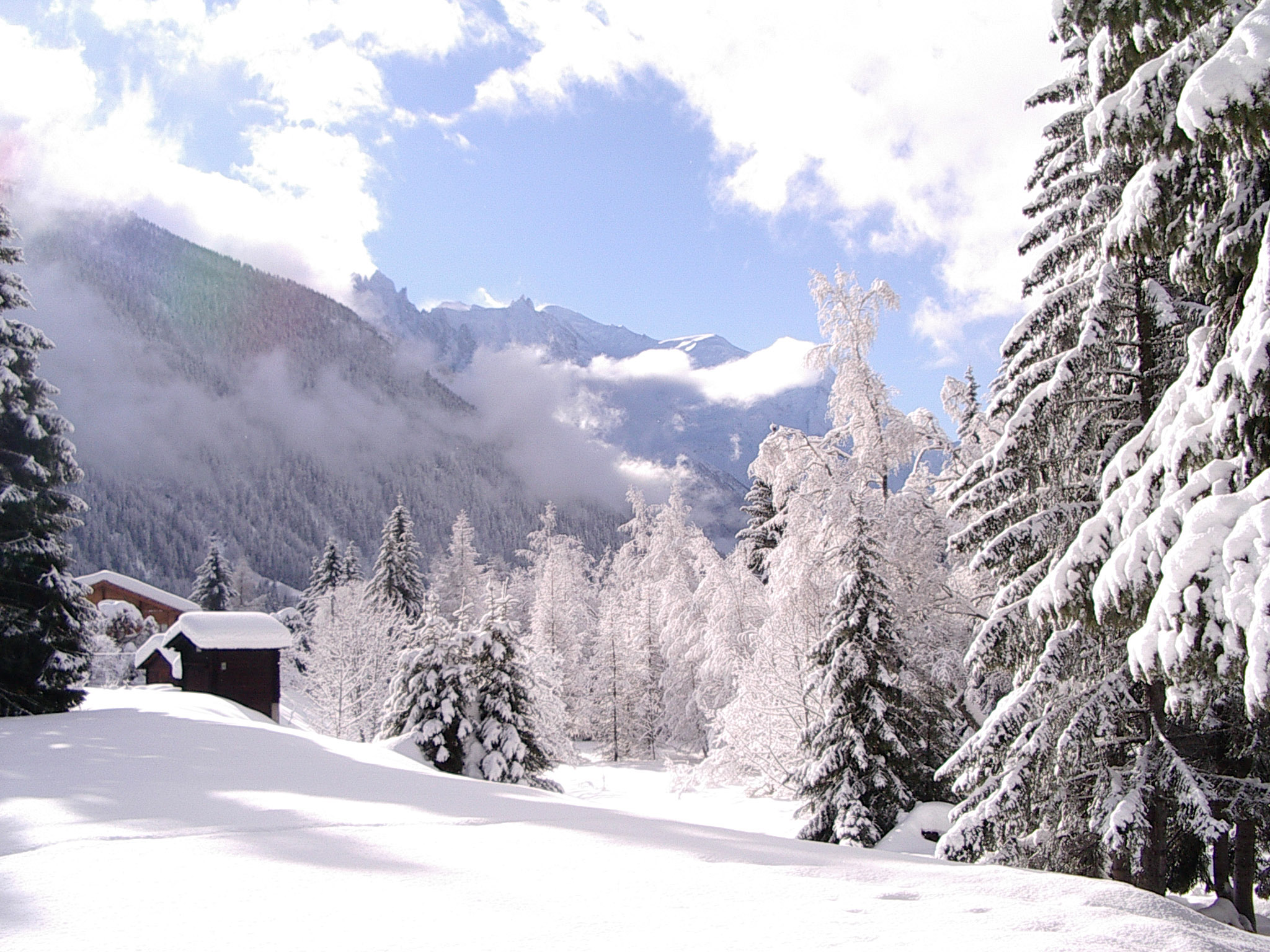
View in Argentière

Argentière (French pronunciation: [aʁʒɑ̃tjɛʁ]) is a picturesque skiing, alpine walking and mountaineering village in the French Alps, part of the commune of Chamonix-Mont-Blanc, at an altitude of 1,252 m (4,108 ft).

== Geography ==
Argentière is located near the head of the Valley of Chamonix approximately 7 km (4 mi) from Chamonix town. It is connected by road with Switzerland by the pass over the Col des Montets and the Col de la Forclaz to Martigny in the Rhône Valley. The village also lies on the route of the scenic Mont-Blanc Express railway which runs from Saint-Gervais-les-Bains-Le Fayet station through Chamonix, Argentière and Vallorcine before crossing the France–Switzerland border at Le Châtelard, passing through Finhaut before reaching the end of the line in Martigny.

The Argentière Glacier, which lies to the southeast of the village, is bound on its northeast side by the Aiguille du Chardonnet, the Aiguille d'Argentière and the Tour Noir, as well as on its southwest by the Aiguille Verte, Les Droites and Les Courtes. This area is generally known as the Argentière basin.

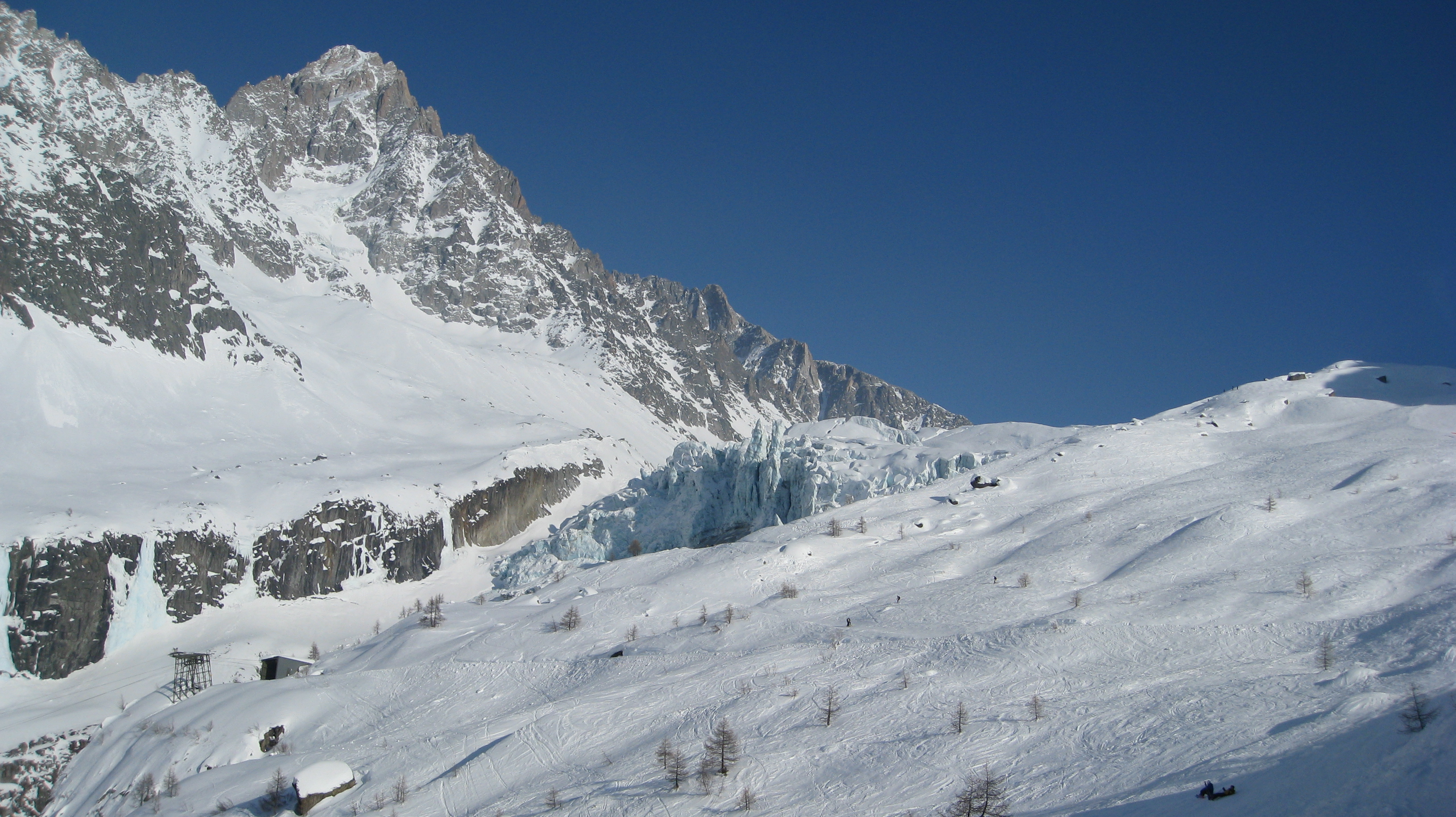
Argentière Glacier

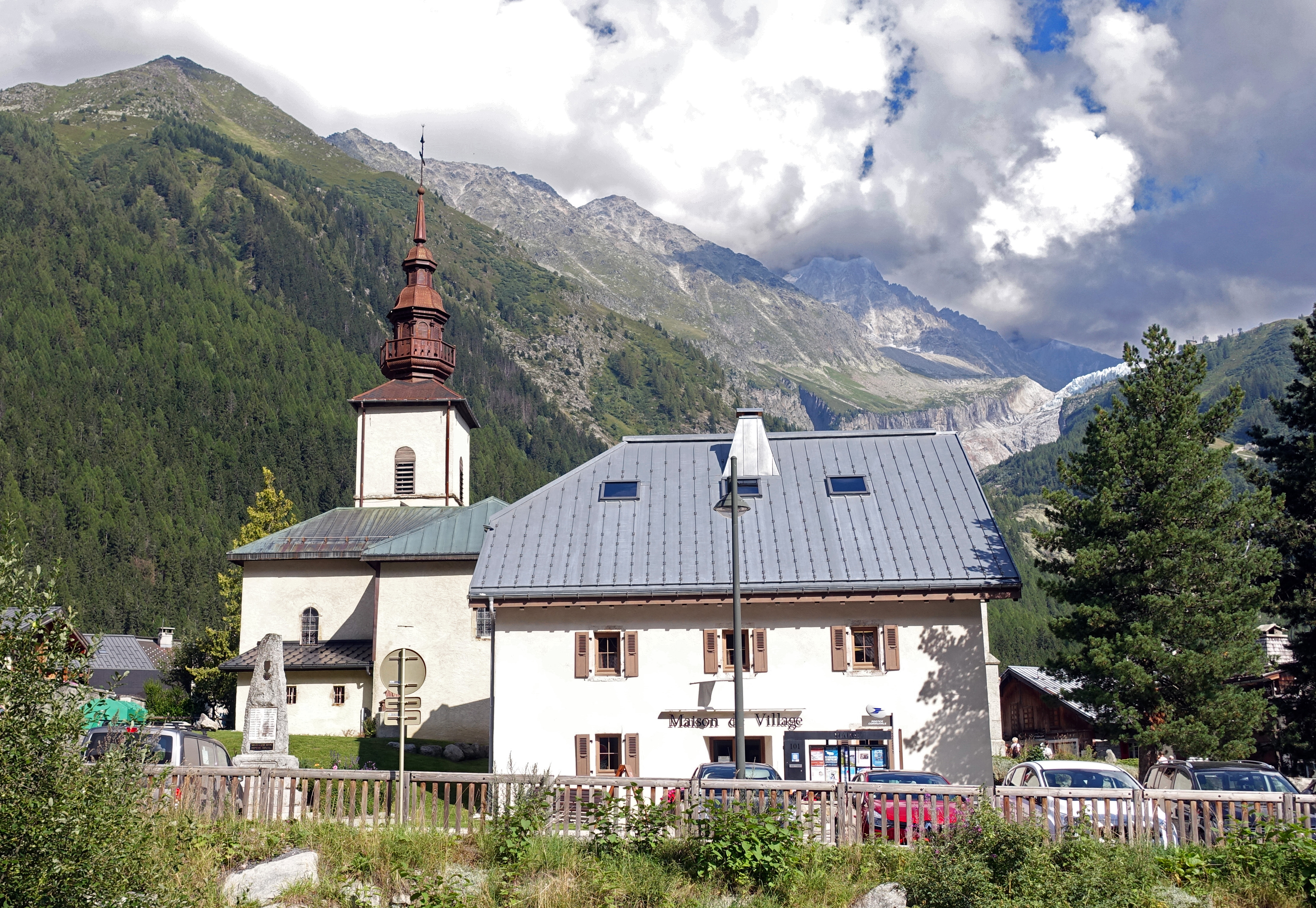
Église Saint-Pierre

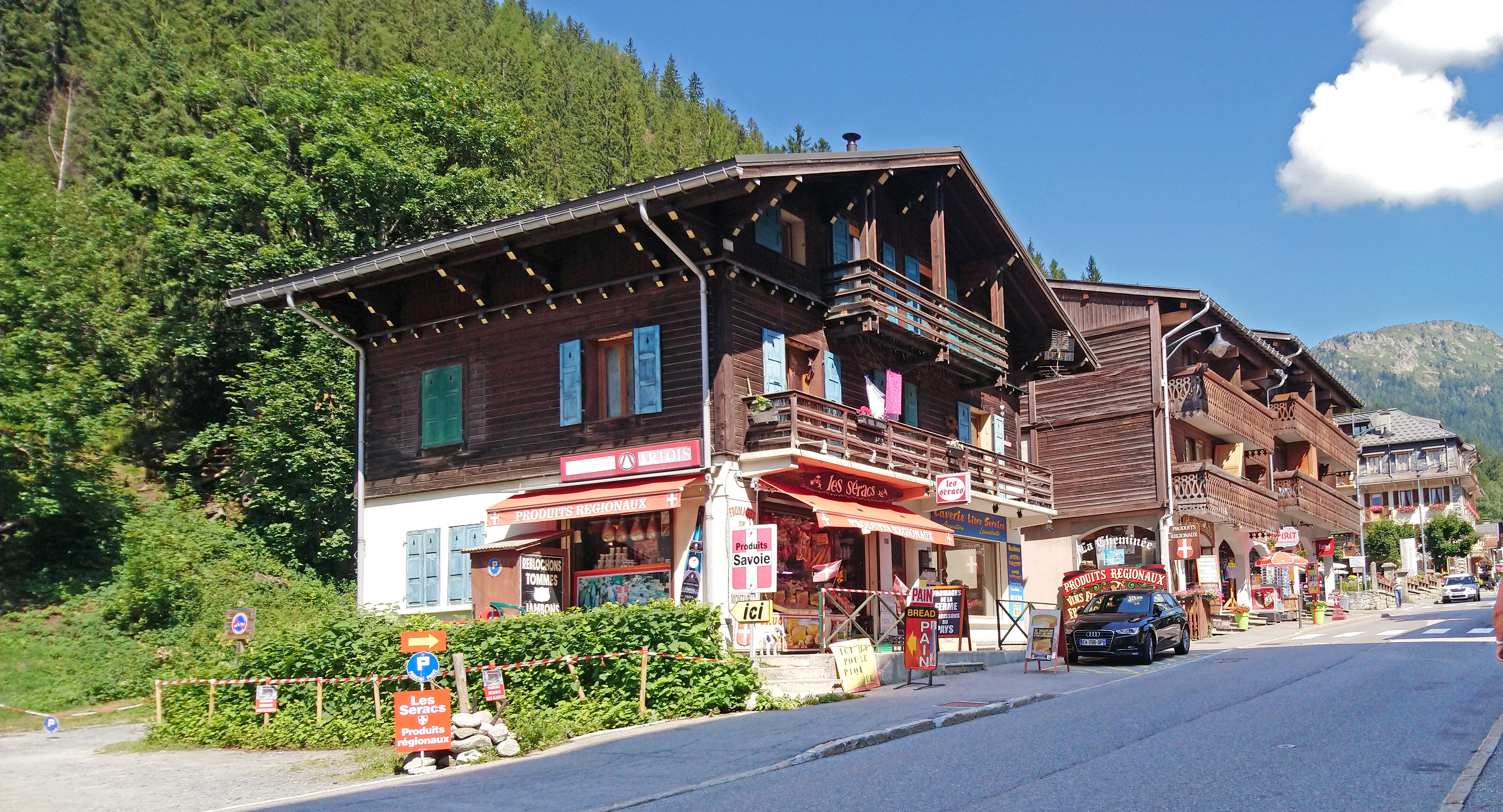
Village centre

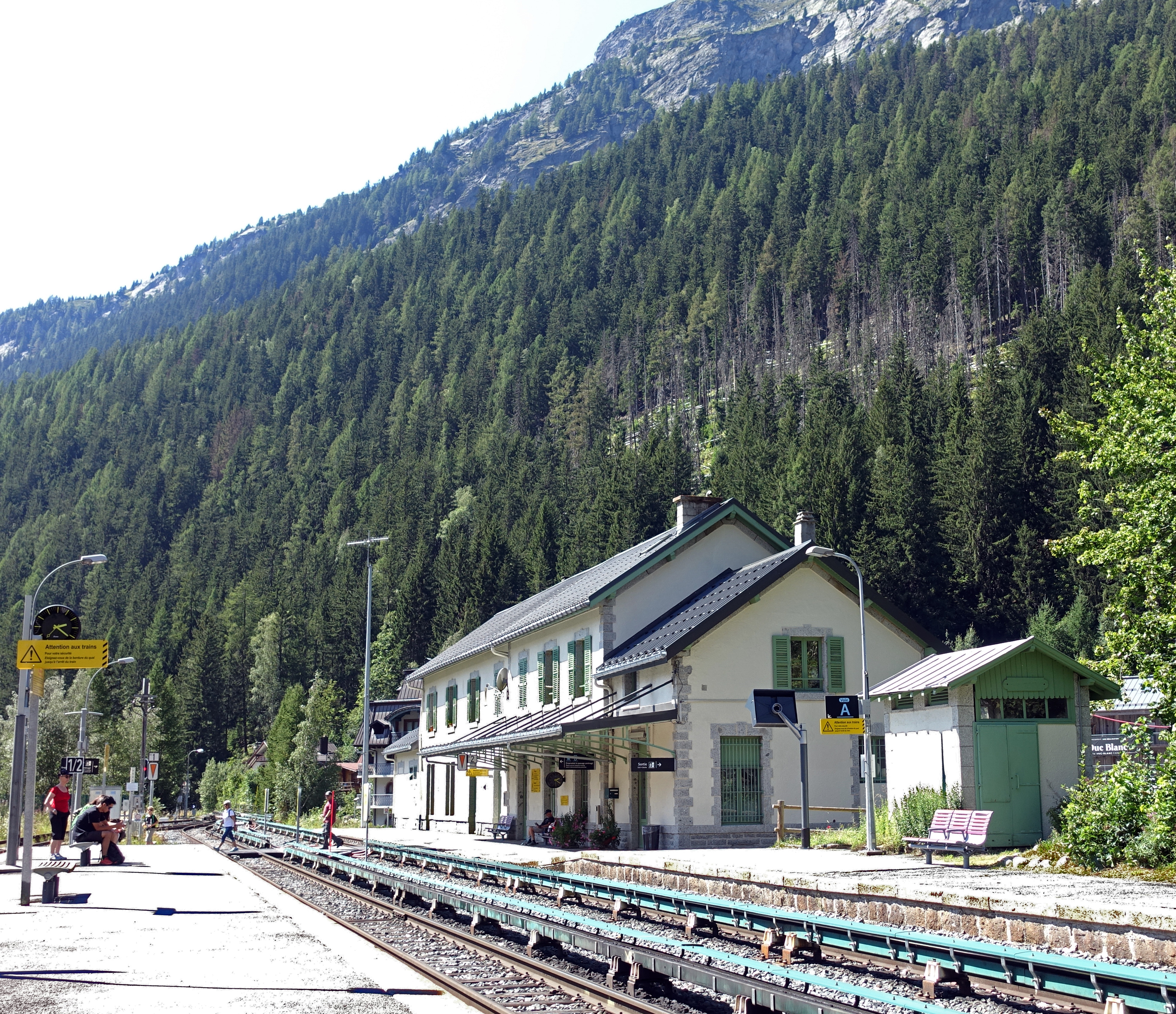
Argentière station

== Winter sports ==
Argentiere is a popular destination for skiing, snowboarding and snowshoeing, attracting many skiers and snowboarders in the winter season – typically mid-December to early May – and is an ideal location for those who seek an exceptional alpine sports experience. The village is an equally popular location in summer season – June to September – for alpine walkers, rock and ice climbers, and as a base for many other alpine sports activities.

Argentière is the starting point for the Téléphérique du Lognan cable car up to Les Grands Montets (3,295 m, 10,810 ft), a skiing area famous for its steep and demanding slopes, both on-piste as well as off-piste. In total, the skiing area is served by a cable car (in two sections), a gondola, five chairlifts and some skilifts. Along with the Vallée Blanche, Les Grands Montets draws skiers from all around the world to the Chamonix Valley each and every year.

Because of its central location three other ski areas, the Valle Blanche, Domaine de Balme[Le Tour/Vallorcine] and Brevent/Flegere are a short journey from Argentiere by Chamonix Bus or the Mont Blanc Express local train.

Overall a total of four easily accessible 'snow-sure' systems, mostly above 2,000 m (6,600 ft) that together provide more than 150 km (93 mi) of marked pistes and trails plus extensive off-piste areas with runs suitable for all grades of skier from Beginner to Advanced.

== See also ==
- Aaron ben Perez of Avignon
- Haute Route
- Tour du Mont Blanc
- Saint-Gervais–Vallorcine railway
- Argentière station
- Argentière Hut
