= Pointe des Grands =

Mountain in Switzerland

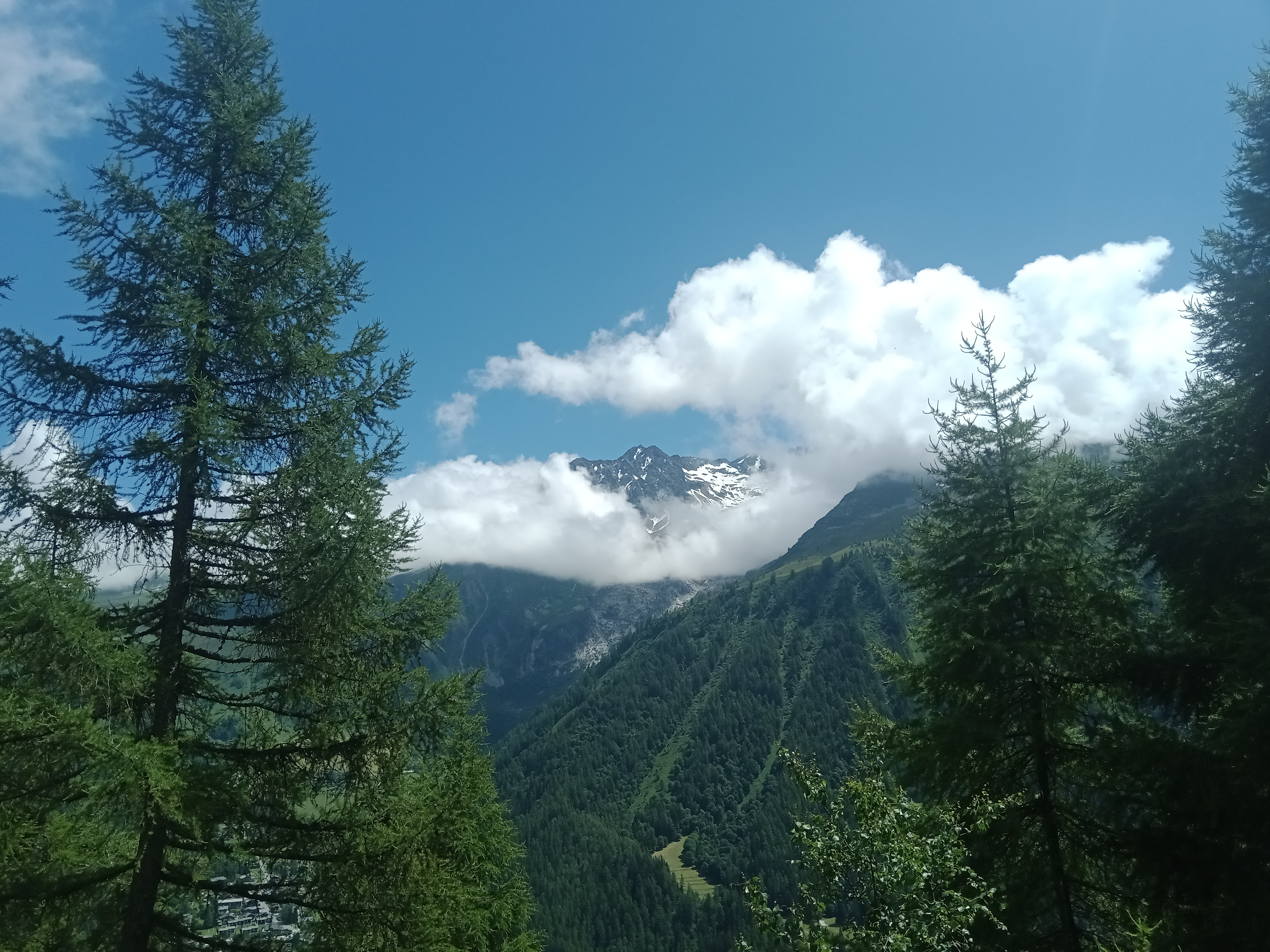

Highest point
- Elevation: 3,101 m (10,174 ft)
- Prominence: 53 m (174 ft)
- Coordinates: 46°00′11.7″N 6°59′23.2″E

Geography
- Location within Switzerland
- Location: Valais, Switzerland; Haute-Savoie, France
- Parent range: Mont Blanc Massif

The Pointe des Grands is a mountain of the Mont Blanc Massif, located on the border between France and Switzerland, north-west of the Aiguille du Tour.

The mountain overlooks the Glacier des Grands on its (Swiss) northern side.
