= Chardonnet =

Chardonnet may refer to:

== Places ==
- Saint-Nicolas-du-Chardonnet, Roman Catholic church in the center of Paris, France located in the 5th arrondissement
- Aiguille du Chardonnet, a mountain in the French Alps

== People ==
- Hilaire de Chardonnet (1839-1924), French scientist and industrialist who invented an early artificial textile fiber (Chardonnet silk)
- Jean Chardonnet, French professor who directed Jacques Chirac's 1954 presentation of The Development of the Port of New-Orleans
- Michèle Chardonnet (born 1956), French athlete who a bronze medal in the 1984 Summer Olympics

== Other uses ==
- An alternative name for wine made from the Chardonnay grape
