= Aiguille du Chardonnet =

Mountain in the Mont Blanc massif in Haute-Savoie, France

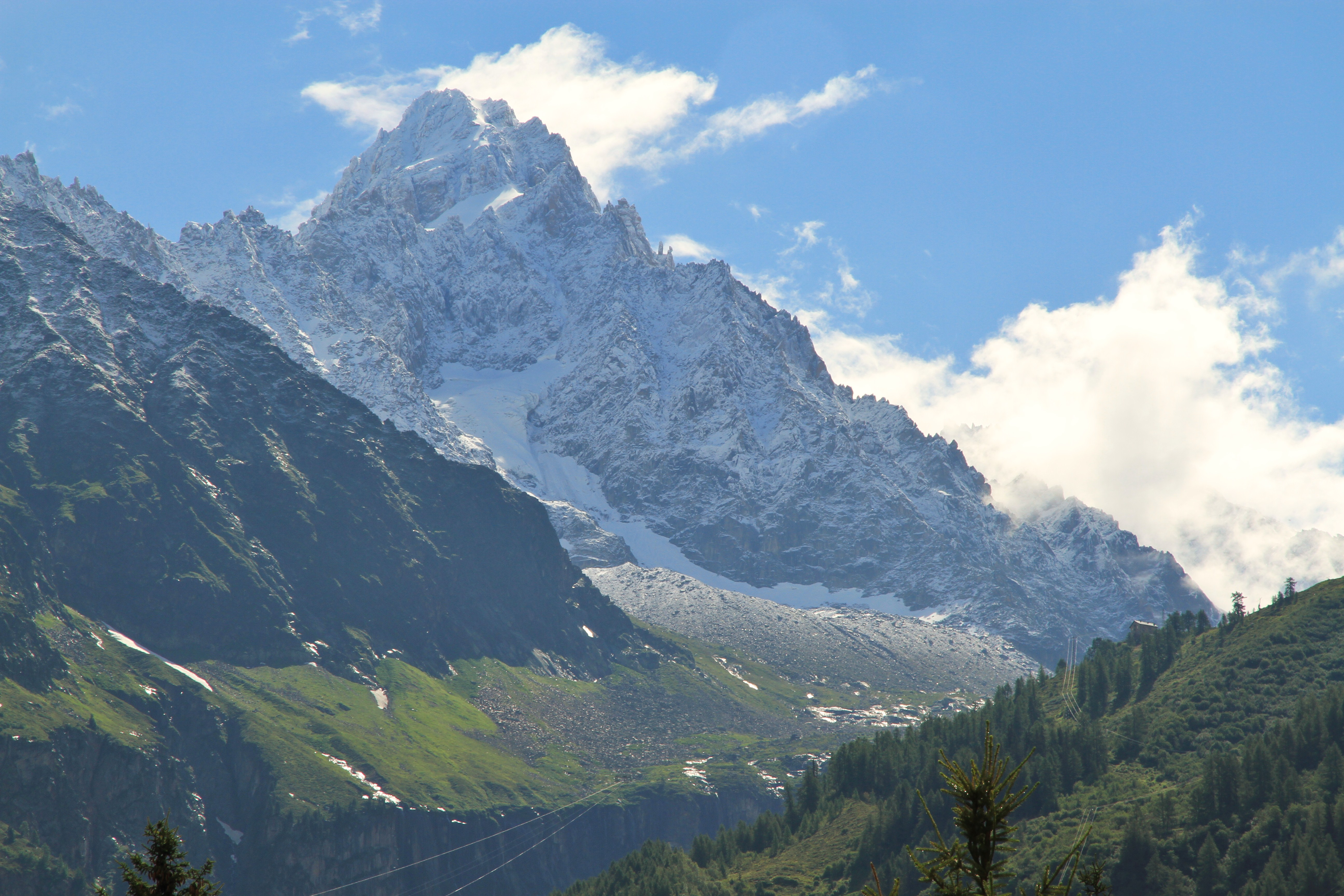
- View from Argentière (west side)

Highest point
- Elevation: 3,824 m (12,546 ft)
- Prominence: 503 m (1,650 ft)
- Listing: Alpine mountains above 3000 m
- Coordinates: 45°58′08″N 07°00′05″E

Geography
- Location within France
- Location: Haute-Savoie, France
- Parent range: Mont Blanc Massif

The Aiguille du Chardonnet (3,824 m) is a mountain in the Mont Blanc massif in Haute-Savoie, France. It lies between the Glacier du Tour and the Argentière Glacier. The border with Switzerland (elevation: 3,680 m at its nearest point) runs just east of the summit. The East or Forbes Arete provides a popular and classic mountaineering route to the summit.

The summit was first climbed on 20 September 1865, by a party comprising R Fowler, M Balmat and M Ducroz. The first winter ascent was made some time prior to 1914.

== Routes ==
- West Ridge – traditionally regarded as the 'normal' and easiest route on the mountain, it is nowadays most commonly used as a means of descent. On the French adjectival climbing scale, is graded at AD−. First ascent P Thomas, J Imboden and J Lochmatter, 1 August 1879.
- East Ridge (Forbes Arete) – a classic alpine mountaineering route described as "one of the finest expeditions of its class anywhere in the Alps", and is combined with a descent of the west ridge. First ascent by L, H and T Aubert and M Crettez on 30 July 1899. Grade AD.

There are many other mountaineering routes on the Chardonnet. On the northern side these include the North Buttress (D−); North Couloir (TD−); North West Couloir (TD−). On the south west face, Capucins Buttress Direct offers along and sustained climbing on rock at D+.

== Access ==
The Aiguille du Chardonnet is most easily reached from the Albert Premier Hut, though the Trient Hut and Saleina Hut also give access.
