= Albert Premier Hut =

Mountain hut in France

Coordinates: 45.996°N 6.986°E

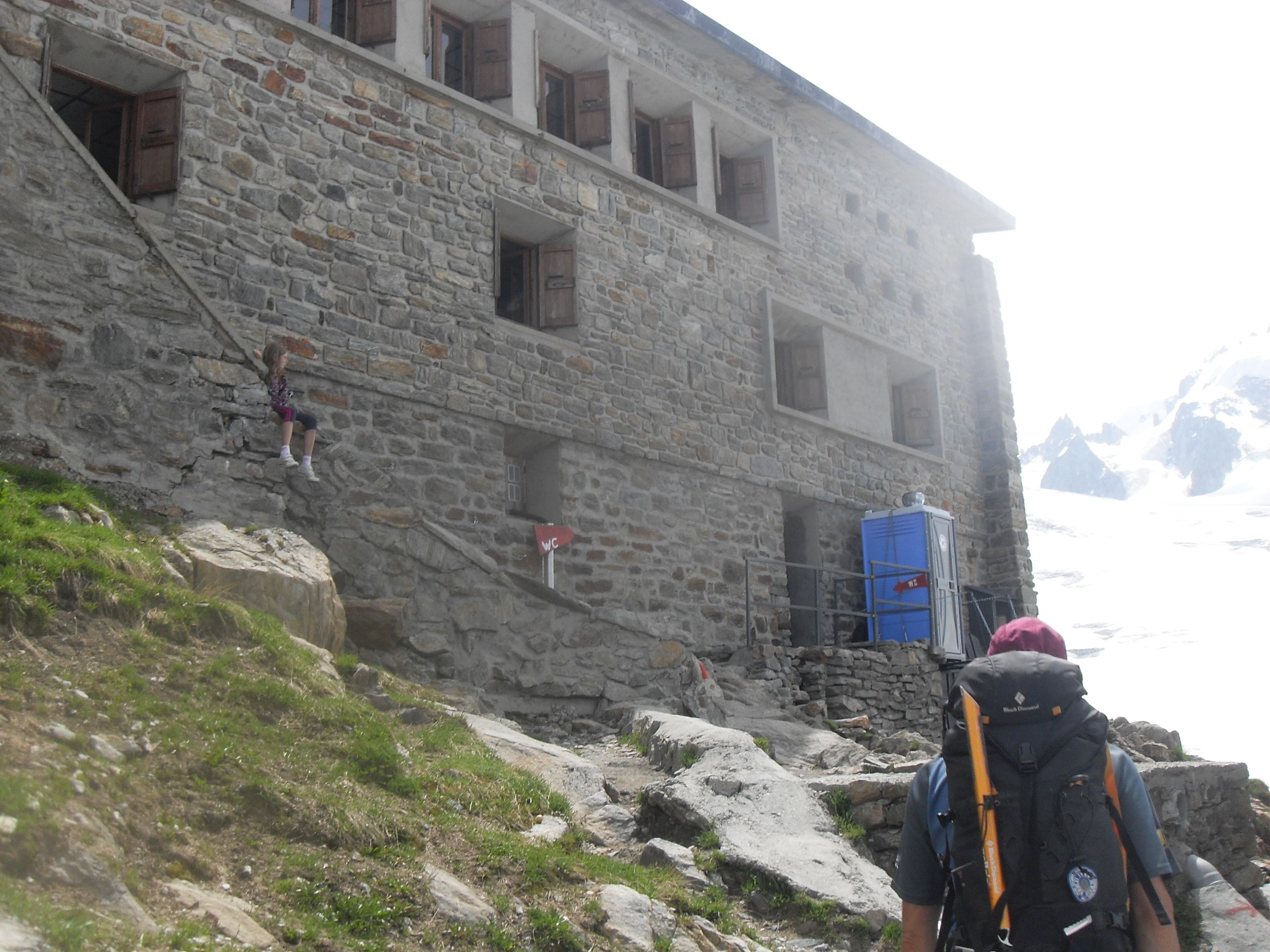
Albert Premier Hut

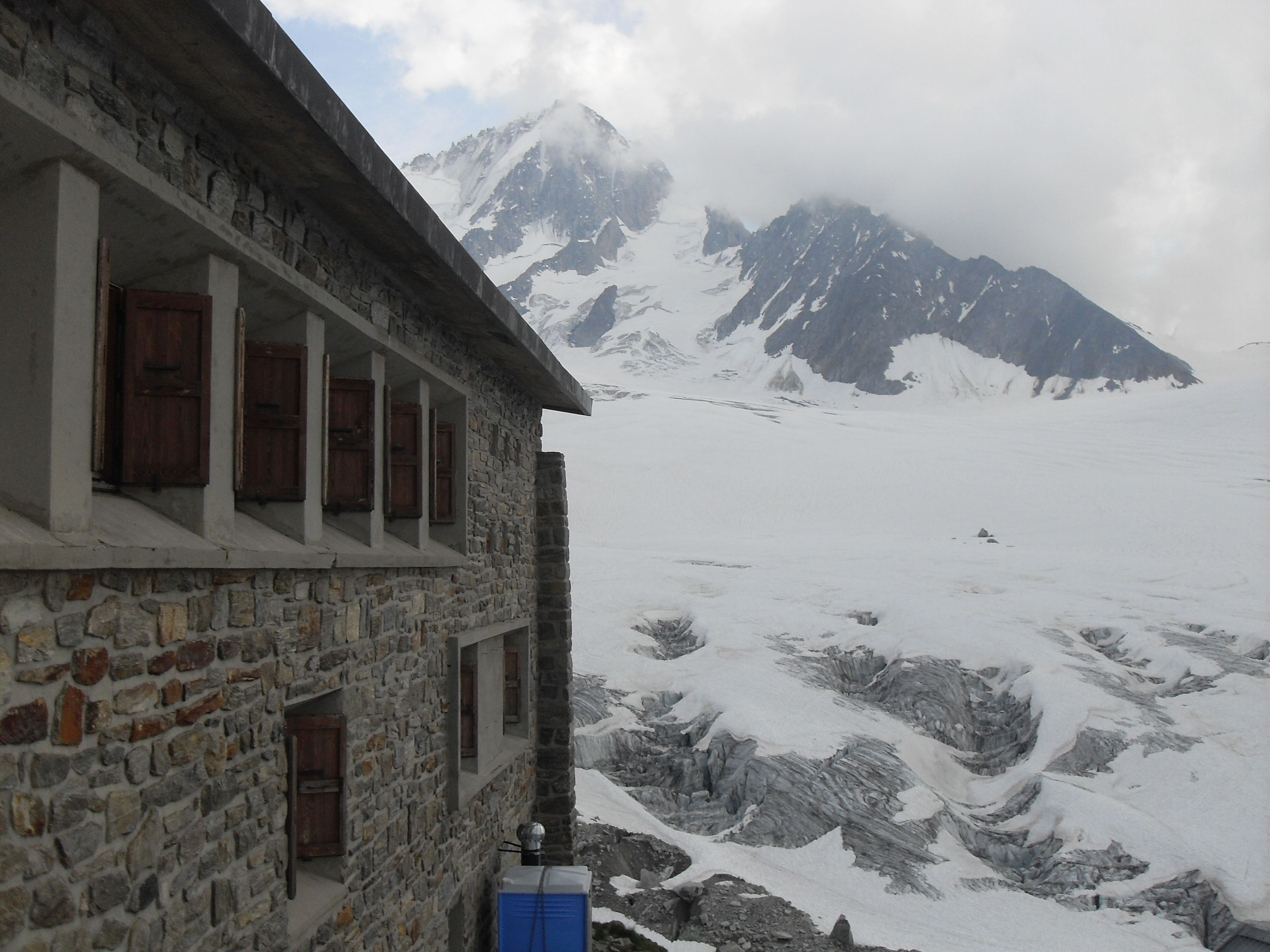
Albert Premier Hut with glacier in background

The Albert Premier Hut (French: refuge Albert-Ier ), sometimes known as Albert 1er, is located on the Haute Route between Chamonix, France and Zermatt, Switzerland. It is at 2,702 metres (8,865 ft) above sea level. It is a popular hut with day hikers because of the short hike (2 to 3 hours) and views of Chamonix Valley. The hut is usually used less by hikers attempting the entire Haute Route, but is popular as a base for climbers attempting the Aiguille du Chardonnet and the Aiguille du Tour. The hut is named after King Albert I of Belgium, who was a passionate alpinist.

The main, newer hut (built in 1959) can hold 137 people and the older hut, for winter use, can hold 30 people. The main hut is staffed from June to September and is operated by Chamonix section of the Club alpin français.

== Access ==
The hut can be accessed from the small village of Le Tour in the Chamonix valley. From Le Tour one can either take a steep 3 to 4 hour hike to the hut or take the Charamillon-Balme to the top then walk a short way or follow the lifts on the ground to the top. From the top of the lift, visitors can follow the path under the Tête de Charamillon to the hut.

== Sources ==
- SummitPost.org
- Official page FFCAM
