= Argentière Hut =

Refuge in the Ligurian Alps in Italy

Coordinates: 45°56′47″N 7°00′16″E

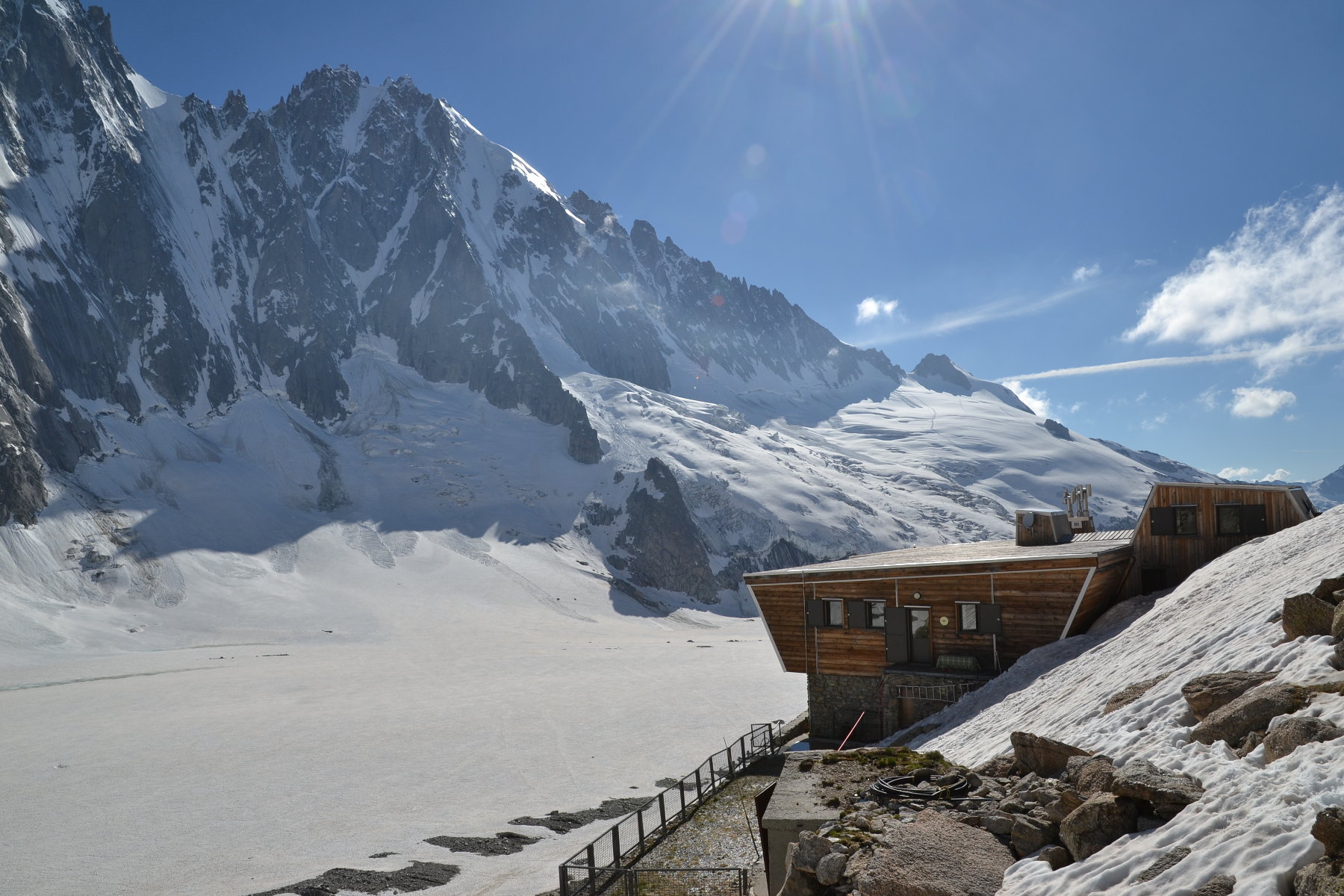
- Interactive map of the Argentière Hut area

General information
- Location: north bank of the Argentière Glacier
- Elevation: 2,691 m (8,829 ft)
- Year built: 1974
- Owner: Club Alpin Français

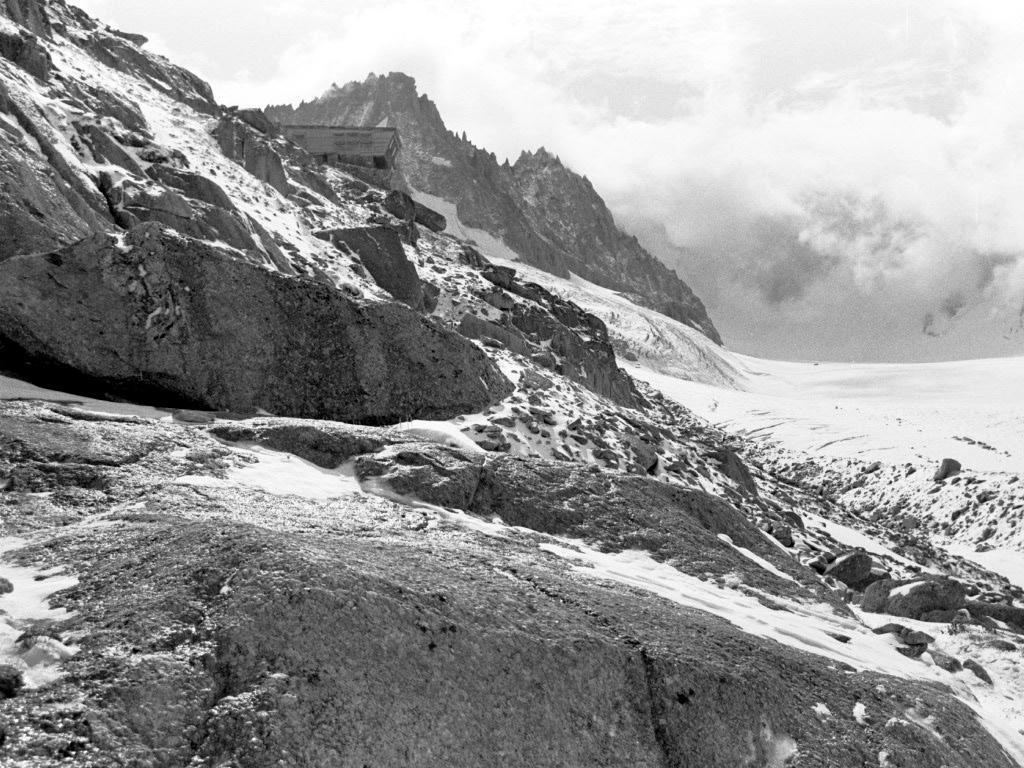
Argentière Hut, showing its position looking out over the Argentière glacier

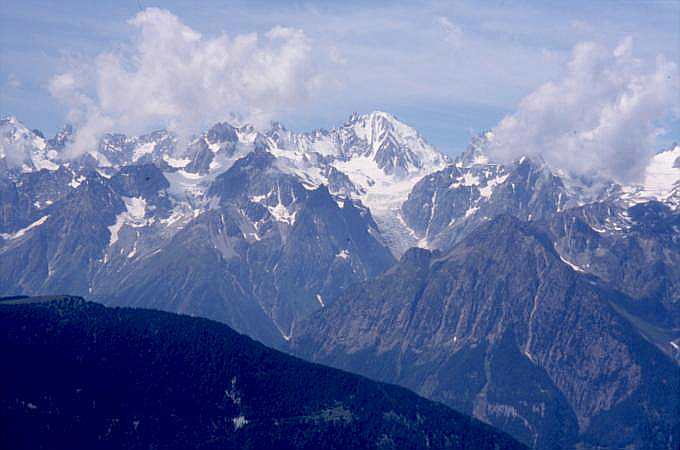
The Aiguille d'Argentiere

The Argentière Hut (French: Refuge d'Argentière) is a refuge in the Mont Blanc massif in the Alps. Built in 1974 by the Club Alpin Français, it is located above the north bank of the Argentière Glacier in France at an altitude of 2,691 meters above sea level.

The hut is wardened and has places for 120 people. It is most usually reached by means of the Grands Montets cable-car, and gives access to classic climbing routes on peaks such as the Aiguille d'Argentière, Tour Noir, Les Courtes and the Aiguille Verte, as well as the steep ice routes of the north walls of the Triolet-Courtes-Droites-Verte chain of mountains.
