= Aaron ben Perez of Avignon =

13th century French Rabbi

Aaron ben Perez
- Occupations: Rabbi, scholar

Aaron ben Perez of Avignon was a French rabbi and scholar; born about the middle of the thirteenth century; died in the first quarter of the fourteenth century. He was one of the leading scholars of Argentière, Languedoc, France. With other influential members of the congŕegation of Argentière, he signed an address to Solomon ben Adret during the great anti-Maimonist controversy of 1303-05. The address, with the signatures, can be found in Abba Mari Don Astruc's Minḥat Ḳenaot, § 47. This appeal was intended to encourage Abba Mari in his efforts to stem the tide of false doctrines rapidly spreading among the younger scholars.
