= Trient Hut =

Mountain hut in the Swiss alps

Coordinates: 45.999°N 7.044°E

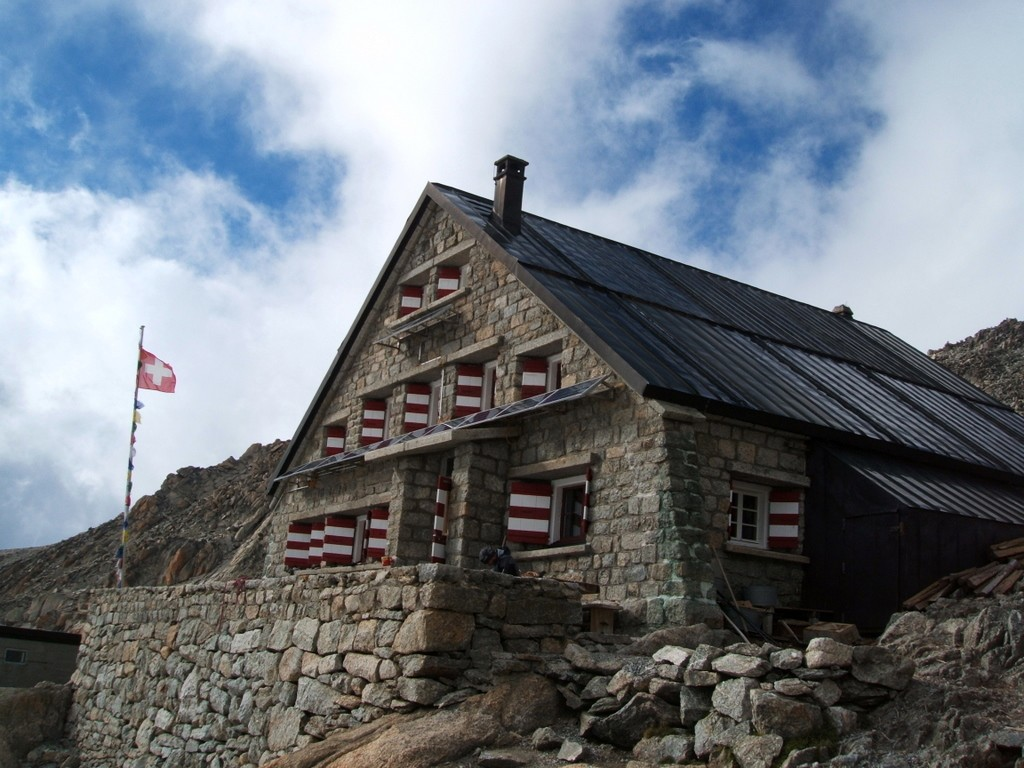
Cabane du Trient

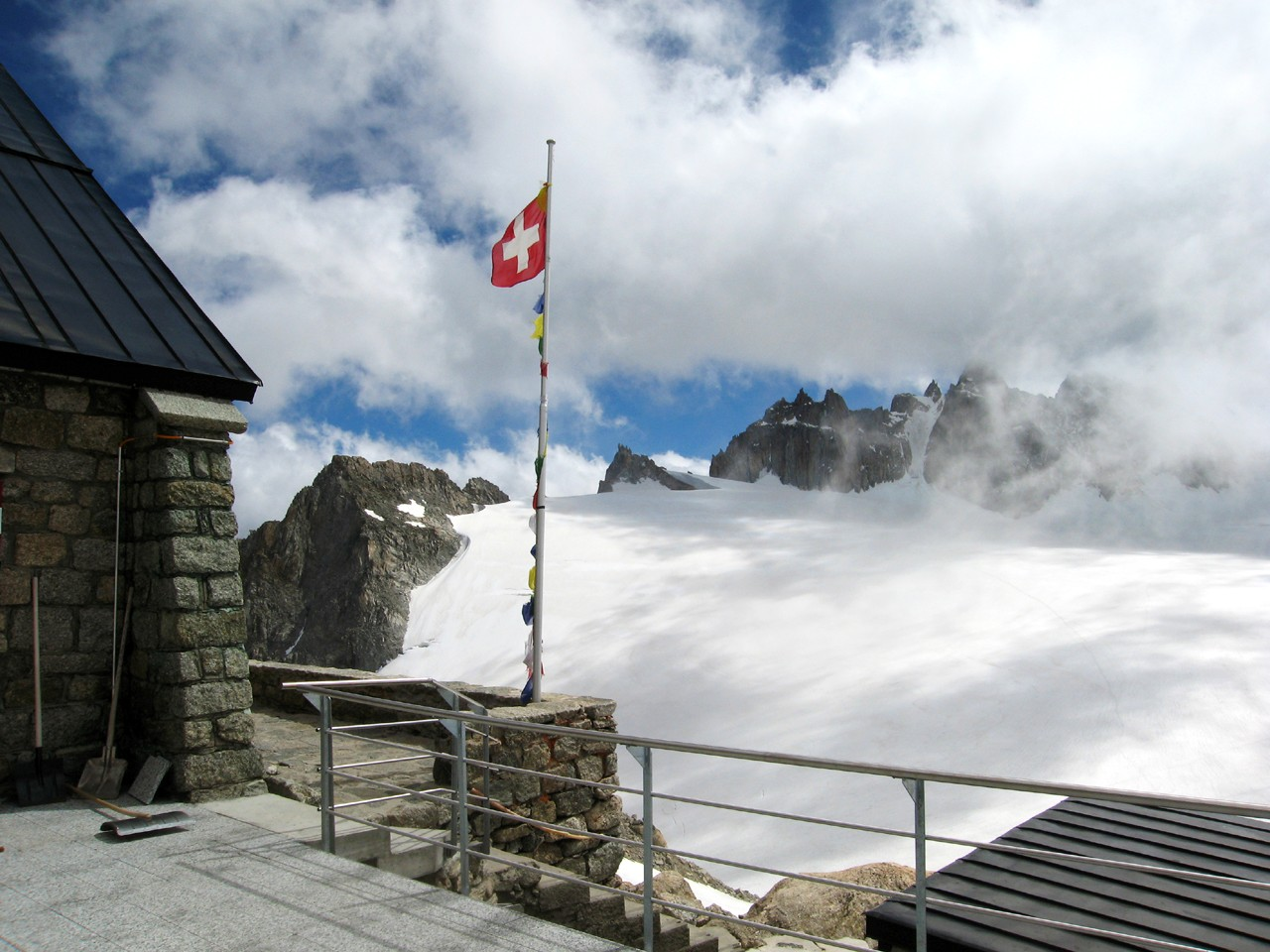
Trient Glacier

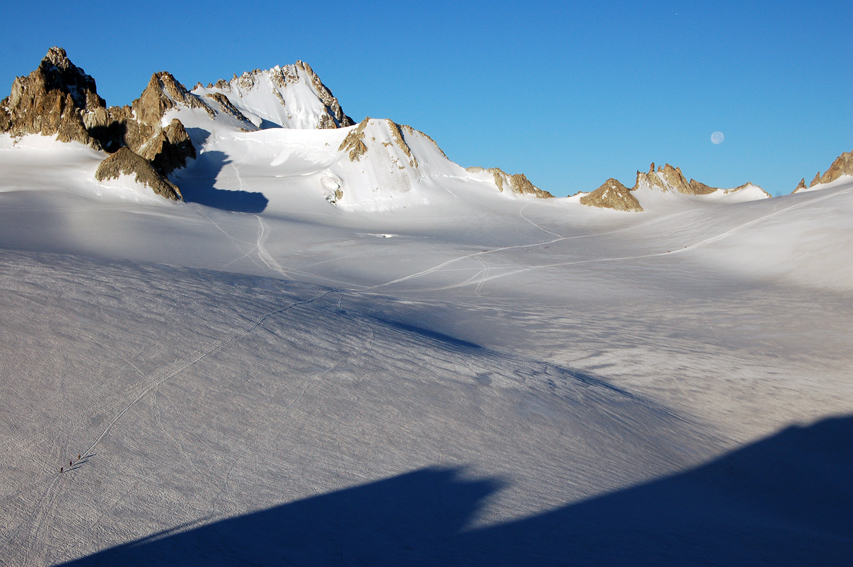
Trient Glacier and Aiguilles Dorées (left)

The Trient hut (French: Cabane du Trient) is a mountain hut in the Swiss Alps, near the Swiss town of Martigny and the French town of Chamonix. The hut sits at an altitude of 3,170 m (10,400 ft), on a rock perched above the Trient Glacier. It can be reached on foot by mountaineers and strong hikers with experience of glacier travel. From the hut you can walk to the Albert Premier and Argentière huts in France, as well as the Cabane de Saleina (Switzerland) at the foot of the Aiguille d'Argentière. The hut is run by the SAC, the Swiss Alpine Club, and has 130 beds. It is a popular base for mountaineers exploring the area, e.g. Aiguille du Tour etc.

== See also ==
- List of buildings and structures above 3000 m in Switzerland
