= Aiguille du Tour =

Mountain in the Mont Blanc massif

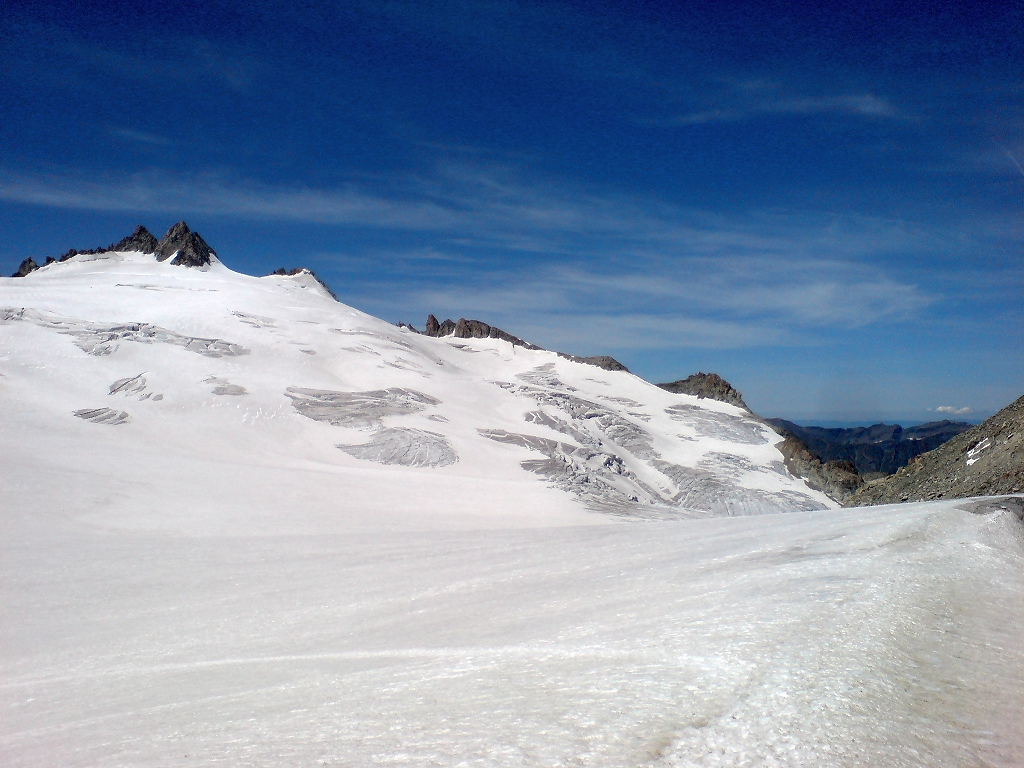
- Aiguille du Tour (left) from the east side

Highest point
- Elevation: 3,540 m (11,610 ft)
- Prominence: 259 m (850 ft)
- Coordinates: 45°59′39.9″N 7°0′35.4″E

Geography
- Location within Alps
- Location: Valais, Switzerland; Haute-Savoie, France
- Parent range: Mont Blanc Massif

Climbing
- First ascent: M. Dreyfus, R. Duval, P. Henry, and M. Ichac in 1926

The Aiguille du Tour (3,540 metres (11,614 ft)) is a mountain in the Mont Blanc massif, located on the border between Switzerland and France. The voie normale on the mountain is graded F (facile) and can be climbed from either the Albert Premier Hut on the French side or the Trient Hut on the Swiss side.

The Aiguille du Pissoir (3,440 m) and the Aiguille Purtscheller (3,475 m) are secondary summits located respectively north and south of the Aiguille du Tour.
