= Argentière Glacier =

Glacier found within the Mont Blanc massif

Coordinates: 45°57′37″N 6°58′46″E

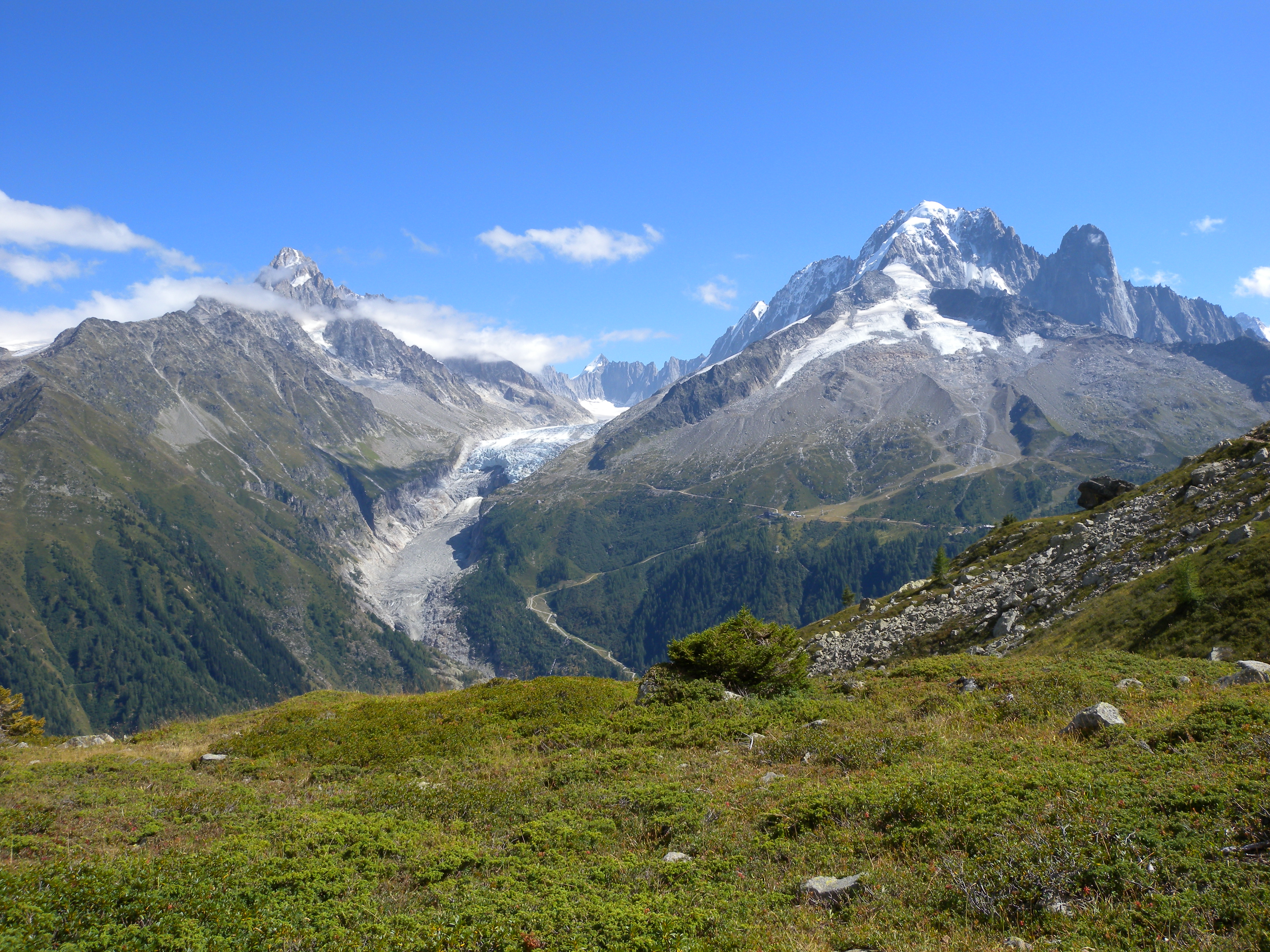
View from a nearby mountain

The Argentière Glacier (French: Glacier d'Argentière, pronounced [ɡlasje daʁʒɑ̃tjɛʁ]) is a glacier in the French Alps. It is one of the larger glaciers found within the Mont Blanc massif, and is situated above the village of Argentière. It lies perpendicular to the Chamonix valley and falls within the Auvergne-Rhône-Alpes region.

From its source to the valley of Chamonix, the Argentière Glacier is nine kilometers long. Like many glaciers in the region, the Argentière has receded significantly. Between 1870 and 1967, the glacier shrank 1000 meters.

The glacier's rapid retreat has been linked to a continuous negative mass balance. A five-year study started in 2004 showed that the glacier had lost an average of 1.5 m between 2004 and 2009, and that there was a 10–11 m loss in average ice thickness from the glacier. As of 2011, it had receded to a position atop a steep slope.

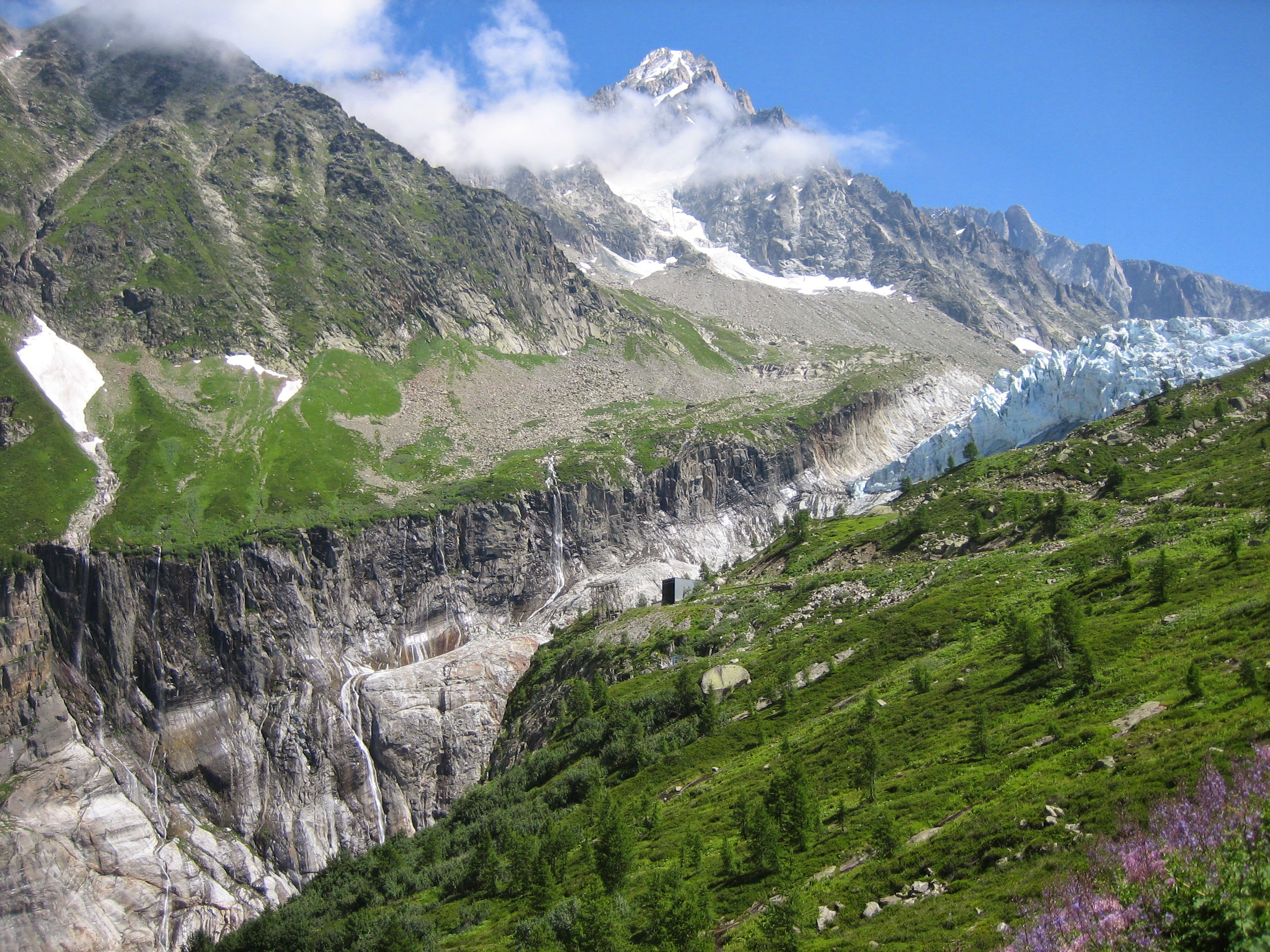
With its surrounding landscape in Summer

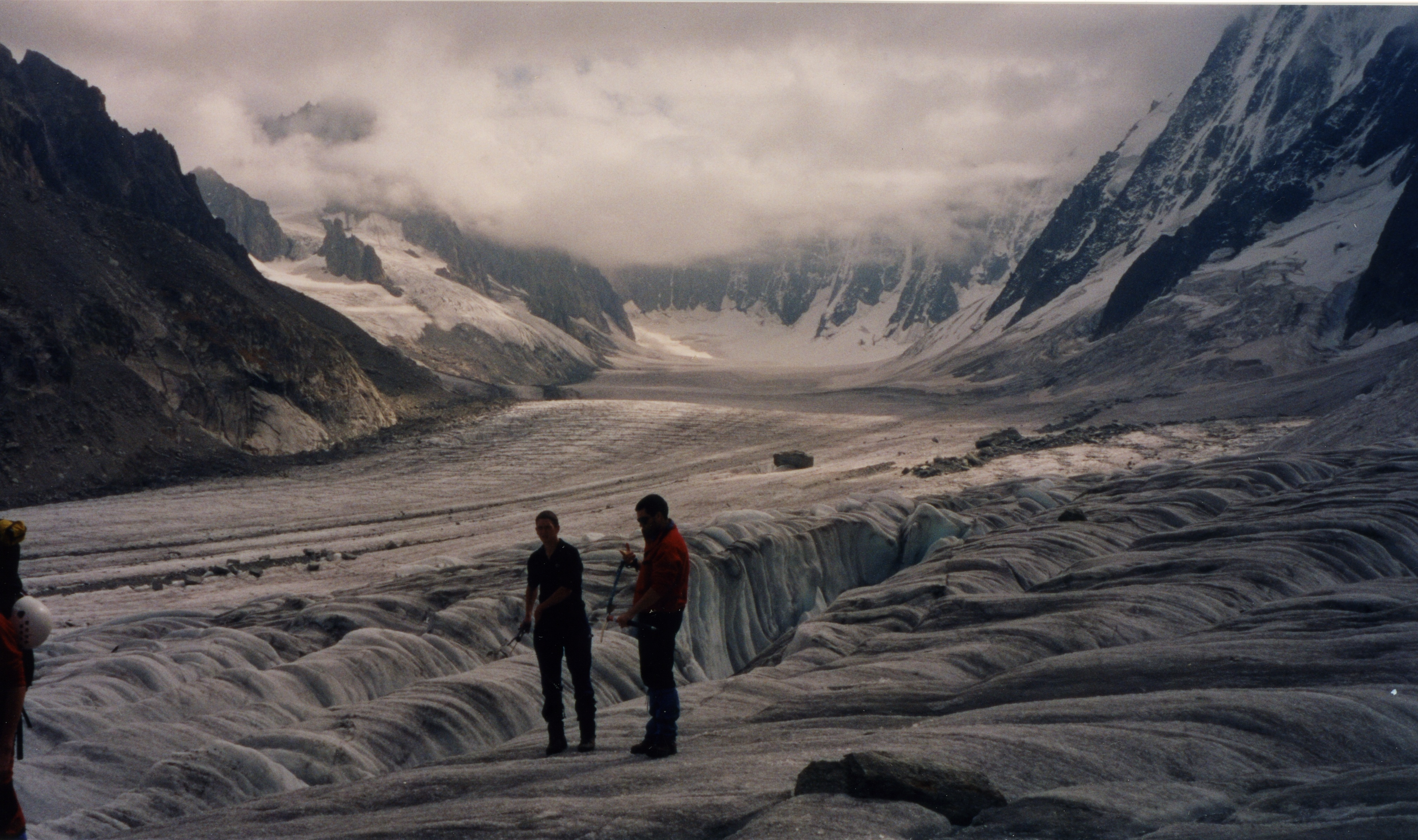
The Argentière Glacier

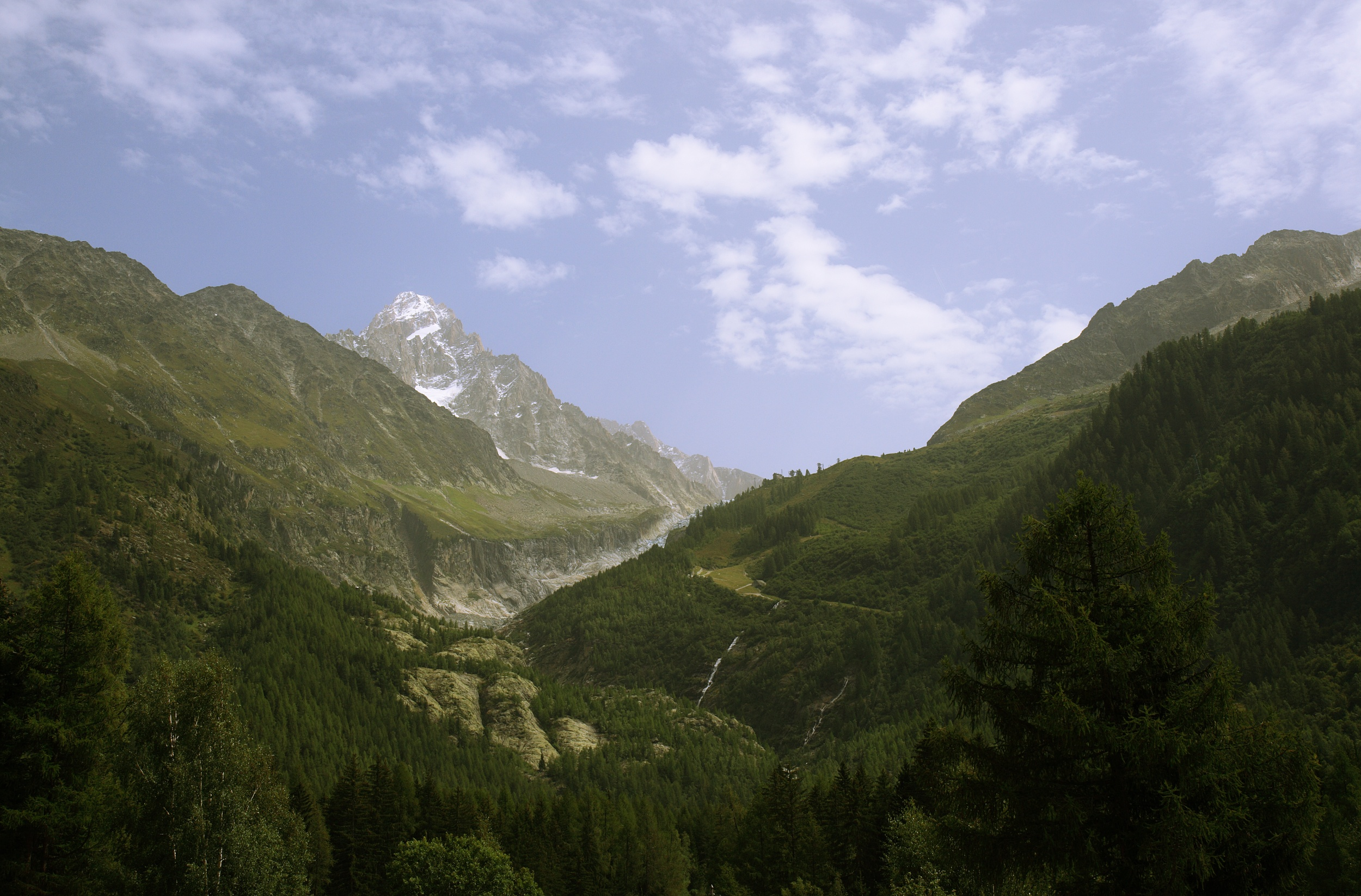
From the train station of Argentière

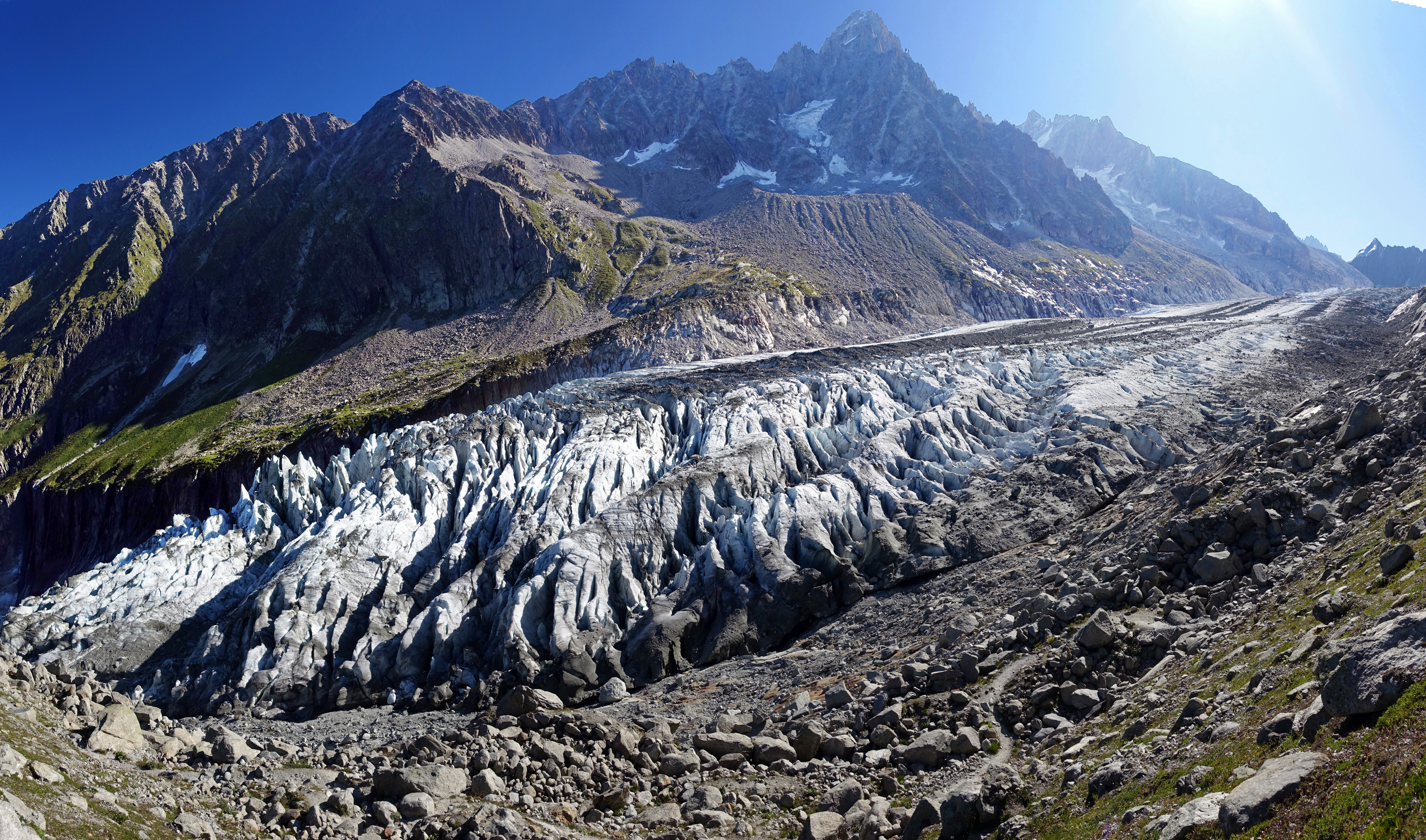
Close view

== See also ==
- List of glaciers
