= Lancebranlette =

Mountain in Italy

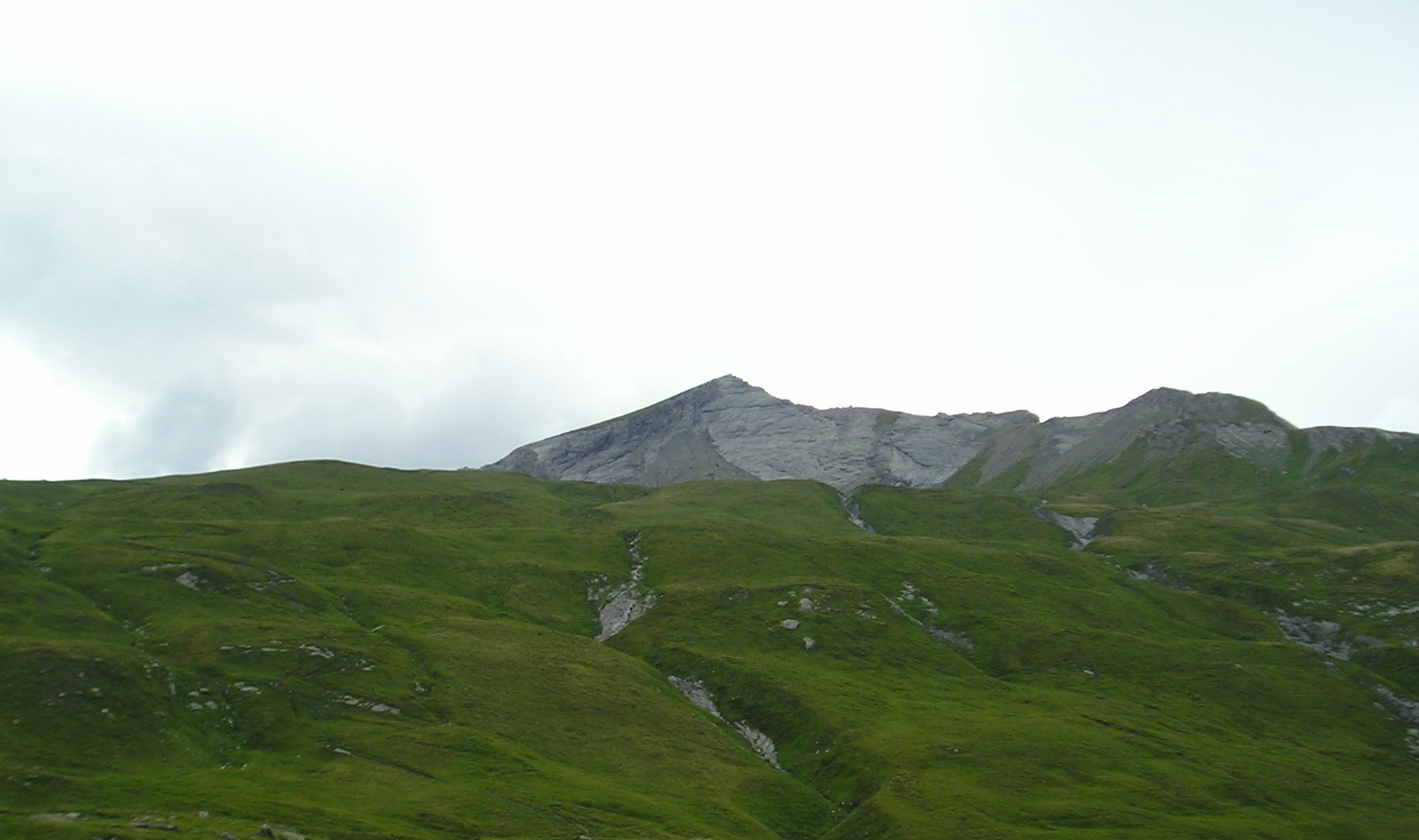

Highest point
- Elevation: 2,936 m (9,633 ft)
- Prominence: 147 m (482 ft)
- Isolation: 0.99 km (0.62 mi)
- Coordinates: 45°41′07″N 06°51′22″E

Geography
- Location within Alps
- Location: Savoie, France; Aosta Valley, Italy
- Parent range: Mont Blanc Massif

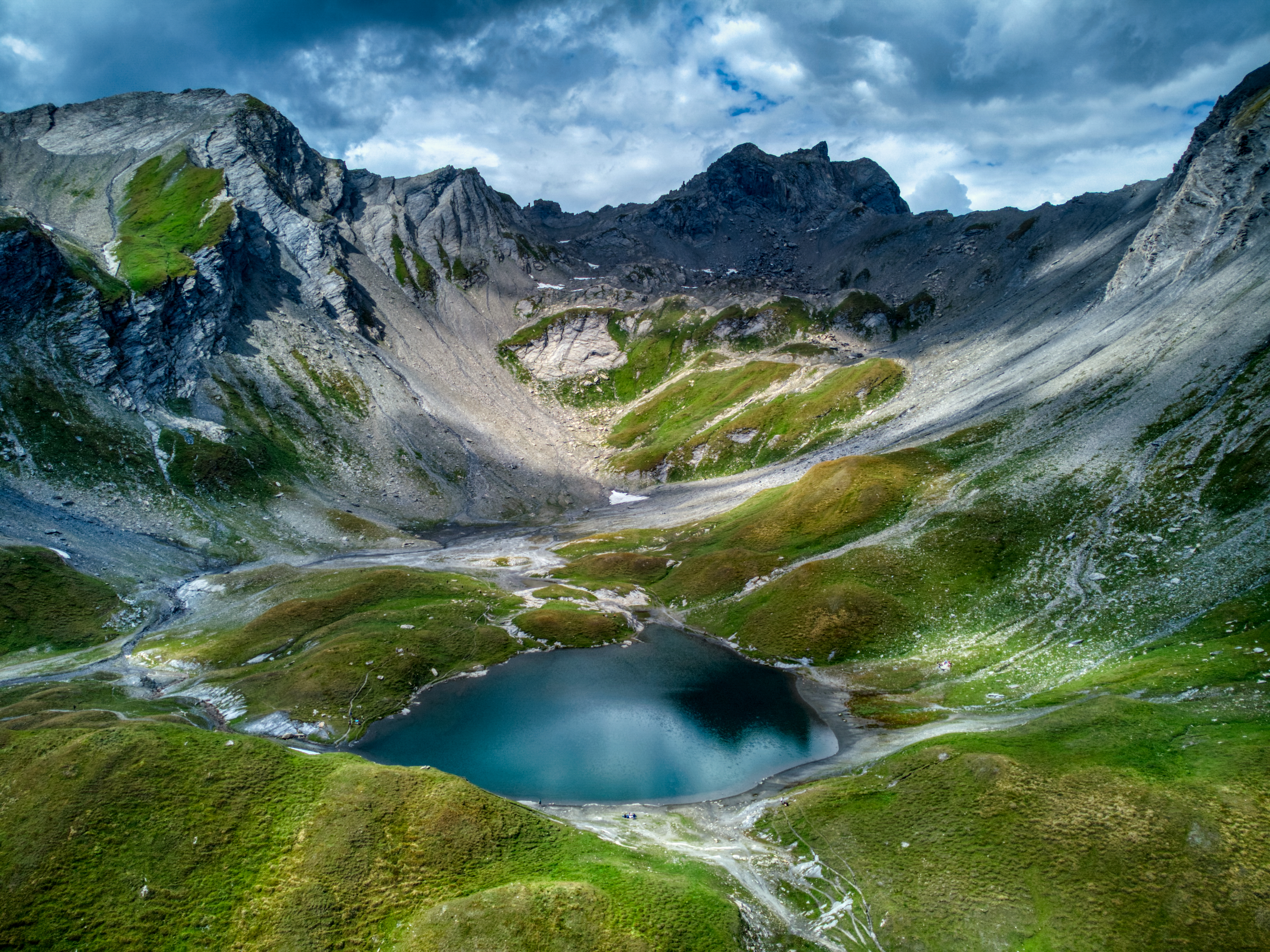
Lac Sans Fond

Lancebranlette (Italian: Lancebranlette) is a mountain of Savoie, France and of Aosta Valley, Italy. It lies in the Mont Blanc Massif range. It has an elevation of 2,936 metres above sea level.
