= List of mountaineering disasters in North America by death toll =

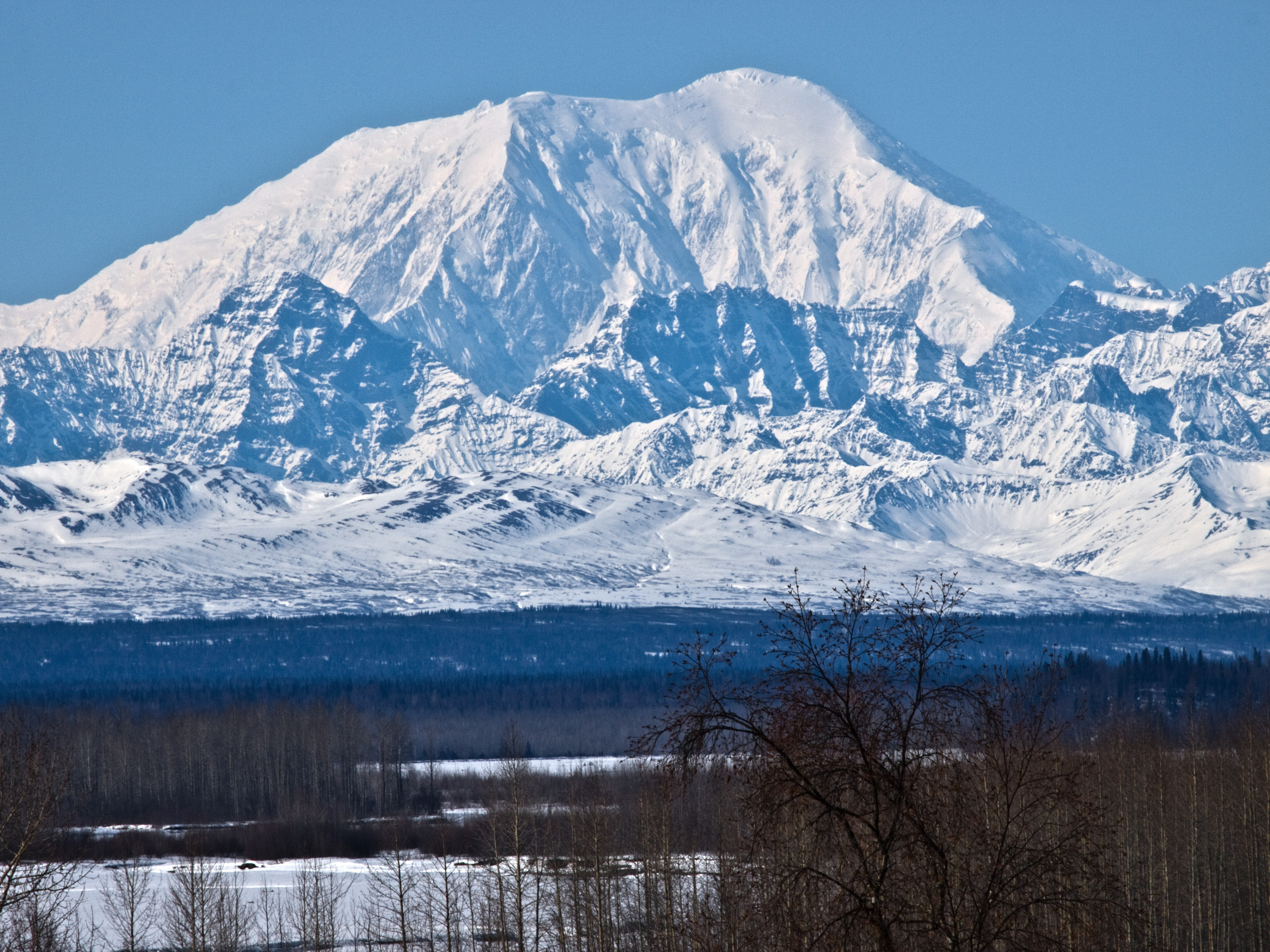
Denali, the highest mountain in North America. At least 100 people have died on the mountain.

The following is a list of mountaineering disasters in North America by death toll. This list includes climbing and mountaineering disasters that resulted in multiple deaths (2+) in North America.

Fatalities	Year	Type	Mountain	Location	Details
11	1981	Avalanche	Mount Rainier	Washington, United States	Ten climbers and a guide died during an avalanche on Ingraham Glacier
9	2026	Avalanche	Castle Peak	California, United States	2026 Lake Tahoe avalanche
9	1986	Storm	Mount Hood	Oregon, United States	Seven students and two teachers died from hypothermia during a storm while attempting to reach the summit of Mount Hood
7	1955	Avalanche	Mount Temple	Alberta, Canada	Seven youths from the Philadelphia Wilderness Camp died in an avalanche while on the Southwest Ridge of Mount Temple.
7	1959	Avalanche	Pico de Orizaba	Veracruz, Mexico	In 1959 an expedition of seven disappeared while climbing Pico de Orizaba. In 2015, their mummified bodies were discovered on the mountain.
7	1967	Storm	Denali	Alaska, United States	Seven climbers died in a severe blizzard
6	2014	Fall	Mount Rainier	Washington, United States	Two guides and four clients died in a fall while attempting to summit Mount Rainier from the Liberty Ridge route.
6	1939	Cornice collapse	Mount Baker	Washington, United States	Six climbers fell to their death when the cornice they were on collapsed
5	1968	Lynching	La Malinche	Puebla, Mexico	2 mountain climbers were killed and 3 injured by villagers who believed them to be communists
5	1981	Fall	Mount Hood	Oregon, United States	Five members of the Mazamas climbing group died during a fall from Cooper Spur while descending.
5	1969	Avalanche	Mount Cleveland	Montana, United States	Five climbers were killed by an avalanche on Mount Cleveland on New Years Day.
4	1954	Fall	Mount Victoria	Alberta, Canada	Three climbers and their guide, connected to each other by rope, fell to their deaths while climbing the Victoria Glacier. Three other climbers in the group who were not connected to them were later rescued.
4	2012	Avalanche	Denali	Alaska, United States	Four climbers died in an avalanche.
4	2023	Fall	Pico de Orizaba	Veracruz, Mexico	Four climbers were killed in a fall while climbing the southern slope of Pico de Orizaba.
3	2002	Fall	Mount Hood	Oregon, United States	Nine climbers fell into a crevasse on Mount Hood, killing three.
3	2024	Storm	Pico de Orizaba	Veracruz, Mexico	Three people died, including a guide, during harsh weather on Pico de Orizaba. Nine others from the group of twelve were either rescued or descended the mountain.
3	2019	Avalanche or cornice collapse	Howse Peak	Alberta, Canada	Three climbers were killed while descending Howse Peak.
3	2025	Fall	Early Winters Spires	Washington, United States	Three rock climbers killed in a fall in North Cascades National Park.
3	2006	Storm	Mount Hood	Oregon, United States	Three experienced climbers died in a winter storm on Mount Hood.
3	1948	Fall	Norman Clyde Peak	California, United States	Three members of the Sierra Club died in a fall during a descent on Norman Clyde Peak.
3	2025	High winds	Mount Baldy	California, United States	Three hikers killed in failed rescue attempt due to high winds.
3	2002	Avalanche	Mount Foraker	Alaska, United States	3 climbers died in an avalanche.
3	2005	Rock fall	Sharkfin Tower	Washington, United States	A group of climbers were struck by a boulder, killing three in North Cascades National Park.
3	2023	Avalanche	Colchuck Peak	Washington, United States	Four climbers were carried away by an avalanche while climbing the Northeast Couloir route on Colchuck Peak. Three of the climbers died as a result of the avalanche.
3	2021	Avalanche	Bear Mountain	Alaska, United States	Three climbers were discovered dead from an avalanche after being reported missing while attempting to summit Bear Mountain in Chugach National Forest.
3	1965	Fall	Maroon Bells	Colorado, United States	Three members of the Los Alamos Mountaineering Club died in a fall in a couloir.
3	1969	Fall	Mount Washington	New Hampshire, United States	Three men died in a fall while climbing in Huntington Ravine.
3	2024	Unknown	Mount Garibaldi	British Columbia, Canada	Three climbers were found dead after having gone missing while climbing the mountain months prior. Search efforts were hampered by bad weather conditions.
2	1979	Fall	Mount Edith Cavell	Alberta, Canada	Two men were killed in a fall on the north face of Mount Edith Cavell in Jasper National Park.
2	1997	Fall	Ptarmigan Peak	Alaska, United States	Two climbers were killed and twelve were injured during a 1,000 feet (300 m) fall into a boulder field during a descent from Ptarmigan Peak.
2	1979	Fall	Denali	Alaska, United States	Two members of the 1979 Korean McKinley Expedition died in a fall during bad weather.
2	2003	Fall	Mount Caubvik	Newfoundland and Labrador, Quebec, Canada	Two experienced climbers died after one had broken his leg and the other attempted to descend to get help yet also fell due to poor visibility.
2	1960	Accident	Blanca Peak	Colorado, United States	
2	1986	Fall	Mount Robson	British Columbia, Canada	Two men were killed in a fall while climbing Mount Robson, the highest mountain in the Canadian Rockies.
2	2018	Storm	Mendenhall Towers	Alaska, United States	Two climbers are presumed to have died during a winter storm while climbing the Mendenhall Towers near Juneau, Alaska.
2	2012	Fall	Heart Mountain	Alberta, Canada	Two rock climbers fell 100 metres (330 ft) to their death.
2	2019	Rock fall	Red Slate Mountain	California, United States	Two climbers were killed by rockfall while attempting to summit Red Slate Mountain.
2	2024	Fall	Mount Whitney	California, United States	Two climbers were killed in a fall on Mount Whitney.
2	2021	Avalanche	Mount Andromeda	Alberta, Canada	Two experienced climbers were killed in an "unsurvivable" avalanche while climbing Mount Andromeda in Jasper National Park.
2	2003	Fall	Tahquitz Peak	California, United States	Two experienced climbers fell to their death in a fall caused by faulty gear and poor weather.
2	2002	Avalanche	Mount Washington	New Hampshire, United States	Seven people where swept away by an avalanche into Tuckerman Ravine while climbing Mount Washington. Two of the climbers died.
2	1996	Avalanche	Mount Washington	New Hampshire, United States	Two men were killed in the Gulf of Slides by an avalanche.
2	1994	Exposure	Mount Washington	New Hampshire, United States	Two men died from hypothermia while climbing Mount Washington.
2	1979	Fall	Mount Washington	New Hampshire, United States	Two men died in a fall in Huntington Ravine
2	1965	Fall	Mount Washington	New Hampshire, United States	Two men died in a fall in Huntington Ravine
2	1964	Avalanche	Mount Washington	New Hampshire, United States	Two men were killed in an avalanche on Mount Washington
2	1958	Exposure	Mount Washington	New Hampshire, United States	A man and a woman died from hypothermia in the Crawford Path area of Mount Washington.
2	1971	Fall	Mount Hood	Oregon, United States	A man and son died in a fall
2	2026	Fall	Mount Rainier	Washington, United States	Two climbers were recovered from the Wilson Glacier section of Mount Rainier after suffering falls.
2	1981	Fall	Mount Hood	Oregon, United States	Two men died on Cooper Spur
2	1994	Fall	Mount Hood	Oregon, United States	A four-person group of climbers fell while climbing Mount Hood, two of them died.
2	2018	Fall	El Capitan	California, United States	Two climbers fell 1,000 feet (300 m) to their death while climbing El Capitan.
2	2011	Avalanche	Denali	Alaska, United States	An Israeli and a Canadian died in an avalanche while climbing in a gully.
2	2023	Avalanche	The Moose's Tooth	Alaska, United States	Two climbers are believed to have died in an avalanche while attempting to summit the Moose's Tooth in Denali National Park.

== See also ==
- List of mountaineering disasters by death toll
- List of mountaineering disasters in Europe by death toll
