= Mount Hood climbing accidents =

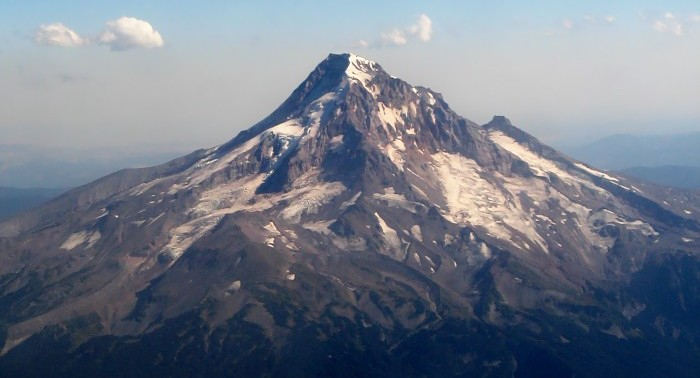
Aerial view of Mount Hood's rugged north side.

Mount Hood climbing accidents are incidents related to mountain climbing or hiking on Mount Hood each year. As of May 2002, more than 130 people are known to have died climbing Mount Hood since records have been kept. One of the worst climbing accidents occurred in 1986, when seven high school students and two teachers froze to death while attempting to retreat from a storm.

Despite a quadrupling of forest visitors since 1990, the number of people requiring rescue remains steady at around 25 to 50 per year, largely because of the increased use of cell phones and GPS devices. In 2006, 3.4 percent of search and rescue missions were for mountain climbers. In comparison, 20% were for vehicles (including ATVs and snowmobiles), 3% were for mushroom collectors, the remaining 73.6 percent were for skiers, boaters, and participants in other mountain activities.

Regardless of route, Mount Hood is a technical climb. It requires ropes, crampons, and ice axes. Approximately 95% of Mount Hood's climbs occur during the period of April through July.

== Hazards ==
Cascade Range weather patterns can be deceptive, with sudden sustained winds of 60 miles per hour (100 km/h), and visibility quickly dropping from hundreds of miles to an arm's length; climbers can experience 60 °F (33 °C) temperature drops in less than an hour after leaving an access point. This pattern is responsible for the most well-known incidents of May 1986 and December 2006.

Avalanches are popularly believed a major climbing hazard, but relatively few Mount Hood deaths are attributed to them. For the 11-year period ending April 2006, there was one death on Mount Hood caused by an avalanche, while 445 avalanche-related deaths occurred throughout North America. Compared to other western states, Oregon has relatively few avalanche fatalities (16 of the 1009 for the U.S. from 1951 to 2015). There are between 100 and 200 deaths each year worldwide from avalanches.

In the United States from 1947 to 2018, "2,799 people were reported to be involved in mountaineering accidents" and 2% of these total accidents occurred on Mount Hood.

The two most common causes of fatal climbing incidents on Mount Hood are falls and hypothermia.

== Incident history ==
=== From 1890 through 1990 ===
According to Mount Hood: A Complete History by Jack Grauer, the first recorded climbing fatality on Hood's slopes occurred on July 12, 1896, when Frederic Kirn eschewed his guide and attempted the trip to the summit alone. Kirn's body was found on the Newton Clark Glacier on the east side of the mountain, after an apparent 40-story fall in connection with an avalanche.

In an unusual accident reported in Grauer's book, on August 27, 1934, Victor Von Norman successfully climbed the mountain via the southern route, along with a group of fellow University of Washington students. He then ventured too close to a fumarole between Crater Rock and the "Hogsback" that connects Crater Rock with the summit ridge, was overcome by oxygen-barren gases emanating from the fumarole, and fell about 50 feet (15 m) to his death. A number of men who tried to retrieve the body over several days were also nearly overcome by the fumes, even after obtaining an oxygen mask, before finally succeeding in their efforts.

In 1961, experienced climber, Colin Chisholm, and his teenage son, Doug, climbed the Eliot Glacier. During the descent of Cooper Spur, a crampon slipped on ice, causing a fall. The two fell on Eliot Glacier. Colin broke his ribs and Doug was unharmed. Their route became known as "The Chisholm Trail".

On March 1, 1969, James Eaton died when he fell headfirst into a concealed 60-foot (18 m) crevasse near the edge of the upper portion of the White River Canyon. Eaton was a ski instructor and a member of the Mount Hood Ski Patrol.

On August 8, 1971, Harry B. Carson, 42, and his wife, 34, Joanne and two sons, Harry Jr., 13, and Clifton, 12, fell on Eliot Glacier while climbing Mount Hood. Carson and his family fell about 1,000 feet while descending from the summit. Harry B. Carson and his son Clifton died from their injuries while Joanne and Harry Jr. were critically injured but survived.

On July 26, 1976, Cecil Rose, 62, a Sheffield, Alabama man fell to his death near the summit at about 7:30 am. Two climbers who witnessed his fall told Clackamas County Sheriffs’ officers they estimated he fell quite a long ways, but were unsure of the exact distance. Other witnesses recalled a 300' fall down icy hard snow, and reports claim Rose was not roped up. One climber stayed with Rose while the other went for help. Clackamas County authorities attempted a helicopter rescue, but it failed because of extreme air turbulence. By the time the ground crew reached him, Rose was dead, deputies said.

On May 19, 1980, Tom Hanstedt died while descending the mountain's southeast face, falling deep into a crevasse on the Newton-Clark Glacier. His body was never recovered.

On June 6, 1981, David H. Turple and Bill Pilkenton died in a fall from Cooper Spur on the northeast side of the mountain.

On June 21, 1981, five members of the Mazamas climbing group died during a fall from Cooper Spur while descending.

On June 12, 1983, Dr. Dan Raven, 27, of Portland, was climbing on the Eliot Glacier with two companions when he fell about 400 feet (120 m). The two other climbers were discovered stranded but still alive. However, Dan was found dead from his injuries, still roped into his climbing gear, hanging from an outcropping at Horseshoe Rock. Due to high winds and unstable snow conditions, the two survivors had to wait twenty-four hours for rescuers to reach them. They were brought down to the 9,100-foot (2,800 m) level, where they were airlifted.

1986 Mount Hood Disaster: beginning on May 12, 1986, one of the worst U.S. climbing accidents occurred over the course of three days when seven students and two faculty of the Oregon Episcopal School froze to death during an annual school climb. Of the four survivors, three had life-threatening hypothermia; one had legs amputated.

May 1986: Patricia Haythorn, 35, and David W. Schermer, 36, slipped off the edge of the mountain near Eliot Glacier. Haythorn did not survive the fall.

On July 11, 1987, Arthur Andersen Jr. was killed when he and two other men fell on the south side of the mountain and slid into a crevasse.

=== 1990s ===
In June 1990, William Ott, who had terminal cancer, died from hypothermia on the mountain.

On July 26, 1994, four climbers who were roped together fell some 700 feet (210 m) down the Cooper Spur route, stopping at the edge of a crevasse on Eliot Glacier. Ole Groupe, 16, of Pendleton and Jerry Milton, 51, of McMinnville died in the fall. The other climbers were rescued by helicopter.

On September 25, 1995, Kenneth Budlong, 45, of Portland attempted to climb the peak via the Cathedral Ridge route. Budlong was very experienced, having summited the peak 22 times before. However, the weather turned very quickly, and Budlong vanished. Despite an extensive search over the following days, his whereabouts were never determined, and his body was never found.

On May 19, 1997, Carlos Loria, a solo climber summited successfully with his dog, Buckwheat. While descending the Coe Glacier he slipped and fell 700 feet (210 m), fracturing his neck. After being reported overdue by family, he was found by rescuers with facial lacerations, slight hypothermia, and cervical trauma. He was rescued and helicoptered to Portland, but Buckwheat was not at the scene. A month later, the dog appeared at Cooper Spur Inn, some 9.4 kilometres (5.8 mi) across the rugged Mount Hood Wilderness, evidently having survived on snow melt and berries.

On September 6, 1997, an experienced telemark skier, Mark Fraas of Hood River, ascended wearing crampons and carrying skis to the 10,000-foot (3,000 m) level of Cooper Spur, not intending to summit. He slipped and fell more than 1,500 feet (460 m) down the Chisholm Trail and Eliot Glacier. Twenty-five rescuers responded to his partner's cell phone call and found him dead. Retrieval required technical mountaineering skills and equipment. Fraas was not known to have any climbing experience. This was at least the 13th fatality from Cooper Spur. All involve loss of footing, inability to self-arrest, and a long fall over rock cliffs above the Eliot Glacier.

On May 31, 1998, during a graduation climb for the Mazamas, several participants were caught in an avalanche. One climber, Tom McGlinn, 39-years old, died and one climber had serious injuries. The climbers were at the 10,700-foot (3,300 m) level on the West Crater Rim route; the forecast was for "significant avalanche danger" and was posted "high avalanche hazard" at the climbing registration of Timberline Lodge. A large slab avalanche fracture occurred at the 10,800-foot (3,300 m) level, 200 feet (60 m) vertical below the westernmost summit ridge. A roped team of three were swept down the steep slope through the Hot Rocks area. One was killed by injuries during the fall and found under four feet of snow about an hour later along with a snapped rope. The other two climbers had a fractured pelvis, and fractured ankle, respectively. The leader who was not roped to the other three, was only briefly caught by the avalanche and had injuries to an ankle and shoulder.

On May 23, 1999, Carey Cardon and Tena Cardon, an experienced pair of climbers summited successfully. Shortly after commencing their descent, one stumbled and both fell more than 2,000 feet (610 m) to their deaths.

On June 22, 1999, a 24-year-old medical student from Michigan, Steven Reed, apparently set out from a remote trailhead where his rental car was found. Temperatures dropped 15 degrees and more than an inch of rain fell beginning the next day. Ten days after his presumed disappearance, searching began with up to 70 rescuers combing the area. Additional searches included cadaver dogs and psychics. His body was never found.

=== 2000s ===
On June 4, 2000, Diana Kornet, 29, slipped as she was looking over the northeast side of Mount Hood. She fell about 2,500 feet (760 m) to her death. She and six friends had reached the summit about 7 am. She had unroped, as many climbers do after reaching the summit, and left her ice axe when she went to take a look. It was windy in this exposed location. After one of her companions called 911, the sheriff's office sent a search plane and found Kornet's body at the 8,700-foot (2,700 m) level at the top of Eliot Glacier.

On August 15, 2001, 15-year-old Evan Clark was hiking with his father and brother, exploring along a streambed, when a refrigerator-sized chunk of ice fell on top of him. The incident occurred near the popular Cloud Cap hiking area on the northeast side of Mount Hood. The teen was airlifted to a Portland hospital but was pronounced dead on arrival.

On September 8, 2001, rescuers abandoned a search for a 24-year-old Hungarian exchange student who had been missing for six days. He had been hiking with friends when he left the group with light clothing and no provisions. Two days after his disappearance, the weather turned cold and snowy.

On May 24, 2002, a 30-year-old Argentine national attempted to snowboard off Mount Hood's summit along Cooper Spur ridge. He lost control after a few turns and tumbled over 2,000 feet (610 m) to his death.

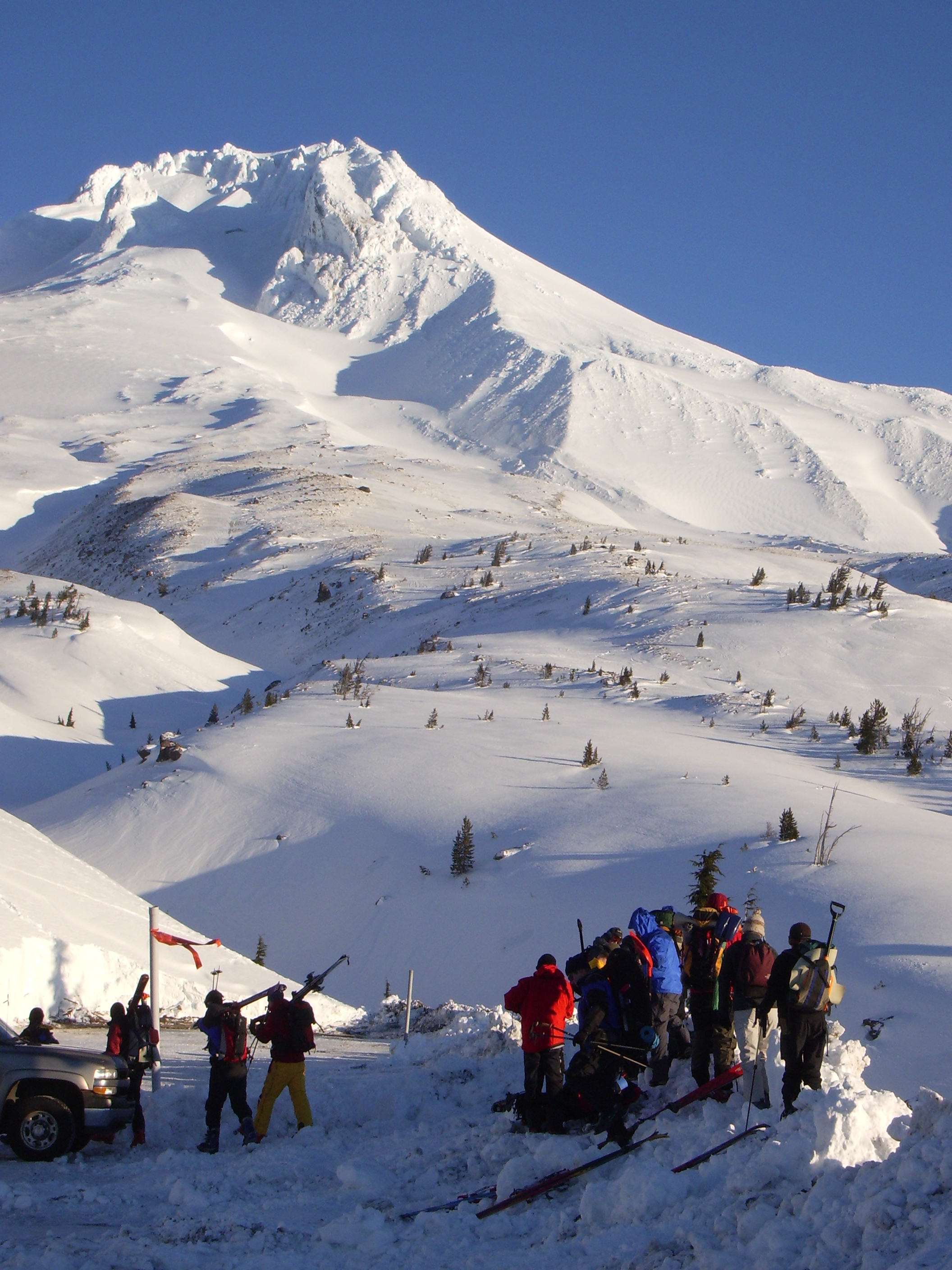
A search-and-rescue team deploys in December 2006 from Timberline Lodge.

On May 30, 2002, three climbers were killed and four others injured when they fell into a crevasse (The Bergschrund) in the Hogsback. Most unusual was the televised crash-and-roll of a USAF Pavehawk rescue helicopter from the 304th RQS, which suddenly lost lift. Though the helicopter's five crew members were injured, luckily no one was killed by the crash. The accident is dramatised in the episode "Nightmare on Mt. Hood" of Critical Situation. The accident is also dramatized in the episode "Chopper Down" of Why Planes Crash.

On March 7, 2003, the search for Fred Frauens, 49 years old, who had been snowshoeing from Timberline Lodge was abandoned after more than four days in heavy winter weather. More than six feet of snow fell during the search. An extensive search five months later for the man's body failed, but unexpectedly discovered the body of another man who was not identified.

On August 26, 2004, Sarah Bishop, 27, of Portland was hiking alone in the Mount Hood Wilderness when she attempted to cross the Sandy River. She was unable to get across safely, was swept away, and drowned.

On November 4, 2004, Kenny Dale Kasselder and Shaun Olcott were beginning to ascend the headwall of the Sandy Glacier when they fell about 100 feet (30 m) into a crevasse. When one of the climbers slipped, the other fell off also, since they were both roped and had not placed any protection. Olcott suffered a broken arm; Kasselder had an injured back and died on the mountain.

On June 24, 2005, Todd Engelhardt of Seattle attempted a solo climb of Mount Hood after his climbing partners decided not to join him that day. On the Cooper Spur Route, at about the 10,000-foot (3,000 m) level, Todd reportedly fell at least 1,500 feet (460 m) to his death.

On Thursday, December 7, 2006, three experienced climbers—Kelly James, Brian Hall, and Jerry "Nikko" Cooke—began what they expected to be a two-day climb on the more technical north face gully of the mountain. On Saturday, December 9, the climbers failed to meet a friend who was scheduled to pick them up at Timberline Lodge. On Sunday, December 10, 2006, James made a cell phone call to his wife and two older sons telling them that he was trapped in a snow cave and that Brian and Nikko had gone for help. Rescue attempts were forestalled by freezing rain, heavy snowfall, low visibility and winds of 100 to 140 miles per hour (160 to 230 km/h), caused by a widespread winter storm. Clear weather on the weekend of December 16 allowed almost 100 search and rescue personnel to scour the mountain. On Sunday, December 17, searchers found what they first believed to be a snow cave and climbing equipment, approximately 300 feet (90 m) from the summit. The rescuers found a rope, two ice axes and an insulating sleeping pad. At approximately 3:29 p.m. PST, the body of Kelly James was found in a nearby snow cave. On Wednesday, December 20, 2006, as good weather ended, the Hood River County sheriff announced that the mission was now being treated as a recovery rather than a rescue. Brian Hall and Jerry Cooke remain missing and have been declared dead.

On the morning of Saturday, February 17, 2007, eight experienced climbers from the Portland area ascended in sunny, mild weather. Observing worse weather mid-afternoon, they camped at the 9,300 feet (2,800 m) level of Illumination Saddle overnight. Sunday morning, they abandoned a summit attempt and descended in freezing rain and snow, visibility less than 30 feet (9 m), and winds at 40 to 70 mph (64 to 113 km/h). At about noon, disoriented, three of the climbers and a black lab stepped off a cliff while roped together and fell down several hundred feet into White River Canyon. This happened at the 8,300 feet (2,500 m) level, at the east edge of Palmer Glacier. The remaining group lowered a climber by rope to search for the fallen group, but returned without seeing them. They called for help by cell phone, and were advised of even worse weather advancing, so they dug in expecting another night. However, rescuers arrived and evacuated them Sunday evening. The three fallen climbers were unable to dig into solid ice to build a snow cave, so they improvised a shelter and were in hourly cell phone contact with rescuers. They had a Mountain Locator Unit, sleeping bags, GPS, and a tarp. The dog, Velvet, helped keep them warm. Rescuers arrived Monday about 10:45 am. One was hospitalized for a head injury, the others were treated for minor injuries and released. The dog had broken nails and a cut on one of her back legs from cold exposure.

On May 12, 2007, five climbers were stranded at the 9,400 feet (2,900 m) level by whiteout conditions. The climbers contacted rescuers by cell phone and obtained assistance to navigate to Illumination Saddle, on the south side of the mountain. Using their GPS navigation unit, the climbers traversed to the saddle and descended the mountain without further incident. The climbers carried a Mountain Locator Unit, which rescuers could have used to pinpoint their location had they not descended from the mountain on their own.

On September 7, 2007, in the early afternoon two Portland-area climbers were ascending the Hogsback to the Pearly Gates when one slid to the edge of the Bergschrund and sustained injuries sufficient for him to call for rescue assistance. His partner decided it was too dangerous to descend the frozen gravel and loose rock face and remained in place. Rescuers arrived about five hours later, assessed the fallen climber, treated minor injuries and belayed him walking down. The other climber required technical climbing equipment and was assisted down the Bergschrund. He walked down and joined his partner about dawn at a Timberline snowcat at the top of the ski area.

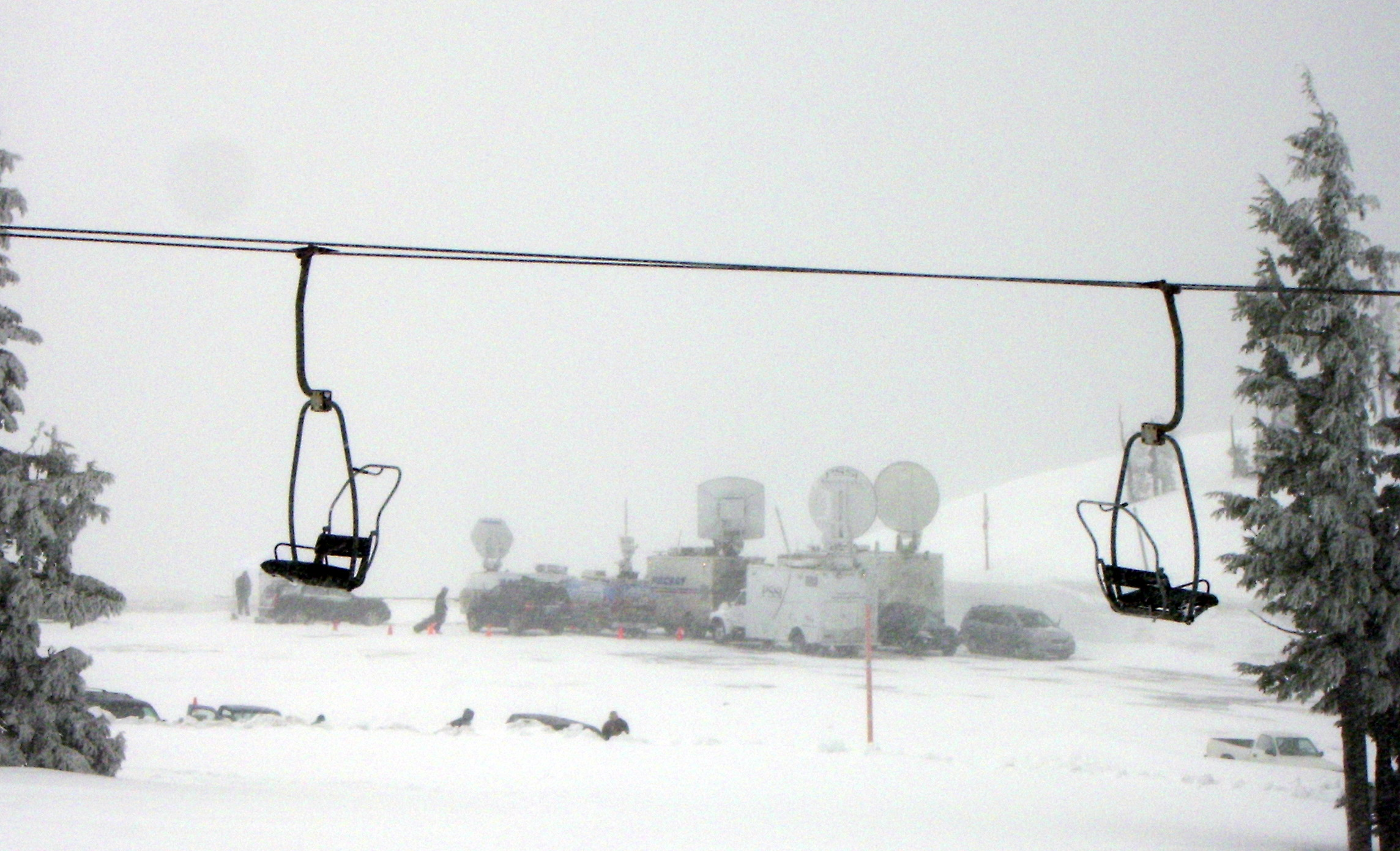
National media covered a minor 2007 climbing incident probably due to the intense December 2006 tragedy coverage.

On January 14, 2008, in good weather, two young and experienced climbers intended to ascend the Leuthold Couloir route. When their return was overdue that afternoon, a search and rescue team was activated for the following morning but was turned back by bad weather. At 9 am, cell phone contact was established and rescuers learned they had spent the night below tree line. Rescuers escorted them out two hours later. The climbers were unprepared for bad weather, which arrived as they reached the 10,000-foot (3,000 m) level. Thinking they had a clear weather window, they had no GPS, nor Mountain Locator Unit, and did not believe their cell phone was usable. Descending with a map and compass, they navigated southward hoping to encounter Timberline Lodge, Government Camp, or the Mount Hood Highway. Not finding either, they reached the 5,000-foot (1,500 m) level and built a snow cave to spend the night. In the morning, they inadvertently discovered a geocache labeled with coordinates just as a rescue sheriff called their cell phone.

On July 27, 2008, a 55-year-old physician and experienced climber, Gary Lee, was descending Cooper Spur with his son when he was struck by falling rocks. He then tumbled nearly 1,000 feet (300 m) over Eliot Headwall to his death. It took rescue teams several days to recover his body due to the difficulty of the terrain and the amount of falling rocks.

On October 19, 2008, an inexperienced solo climber fell as he began his descent after summitting. He slipped, leading to an uncontrolled slide of about 300 feet (90 m) vertical near Crater Rock. He was unable to arrest his fall using an ice ax, and blacked out after his head struck the surface. Another climber witnessed his fall and rushed to assist, observed head trauma and confusion, and called for help using a cell phone, then descended to meet rescuers. A third climber remained with him until help arrived since the victim was unable to descend on foot. Rescuers arrived a few hours later, applied first aid to stabilize, and called for air evacuation to a Portland hospital. He was treated for cuts and scrapes, and released.

On January 17, 2009, a search and rescuer on a training exercise was injured when the ice he was climbing collapsed causing him to fall some 200 feet (60 m) resulting in severe ankle injuries. Another team member was injured, but was able to walk down. Another rescue team was practicing in the area at the time and assisted the first team.

On January 21, 2009, a climber died after a temperature inversion likely loosened ice from cliffs above the Hogsback. She tumbled 400 feet (120 m) before stopping in a natural depression.

On February 1, 2009, two men were ascending the Hogsback. Fatigue and poor weather caused them to abort a summit attempt and descend. One lost his balance and fell some 20 feet (6.1 m) before self-arresting, during which he dislocated a shoulder. The other climber called 911 and initiated assistance. Another group of climbers stopped and helped walk the injured climber to the Timberline Ski Area where a snow cat with rescuers awaited.

On May 17, 2009, a climber received severe injuries to his face, arm and leg in a 500-foot (150 m) fall at the 10,600 level of the Hogsback. At least 40 climbers were attempting to summit at the time. The previous day a climber in a group of ten was struck by falling ice. Both climbers were hospitalized.

On December 13, 2009, rescuers recovered the body of 26-year-old Luke T. Gullberg, of Des Moines, Washington, at about the 9,000-foot (2,700 m) level, two days after a trio began climbing an especially treacherous face of the mountain. On August 26, 2010, after several days of a renewed search effort, Portland Mountain Rescue recovered the bodies of Anthony Vietti and Katie Nolan, still tied together.

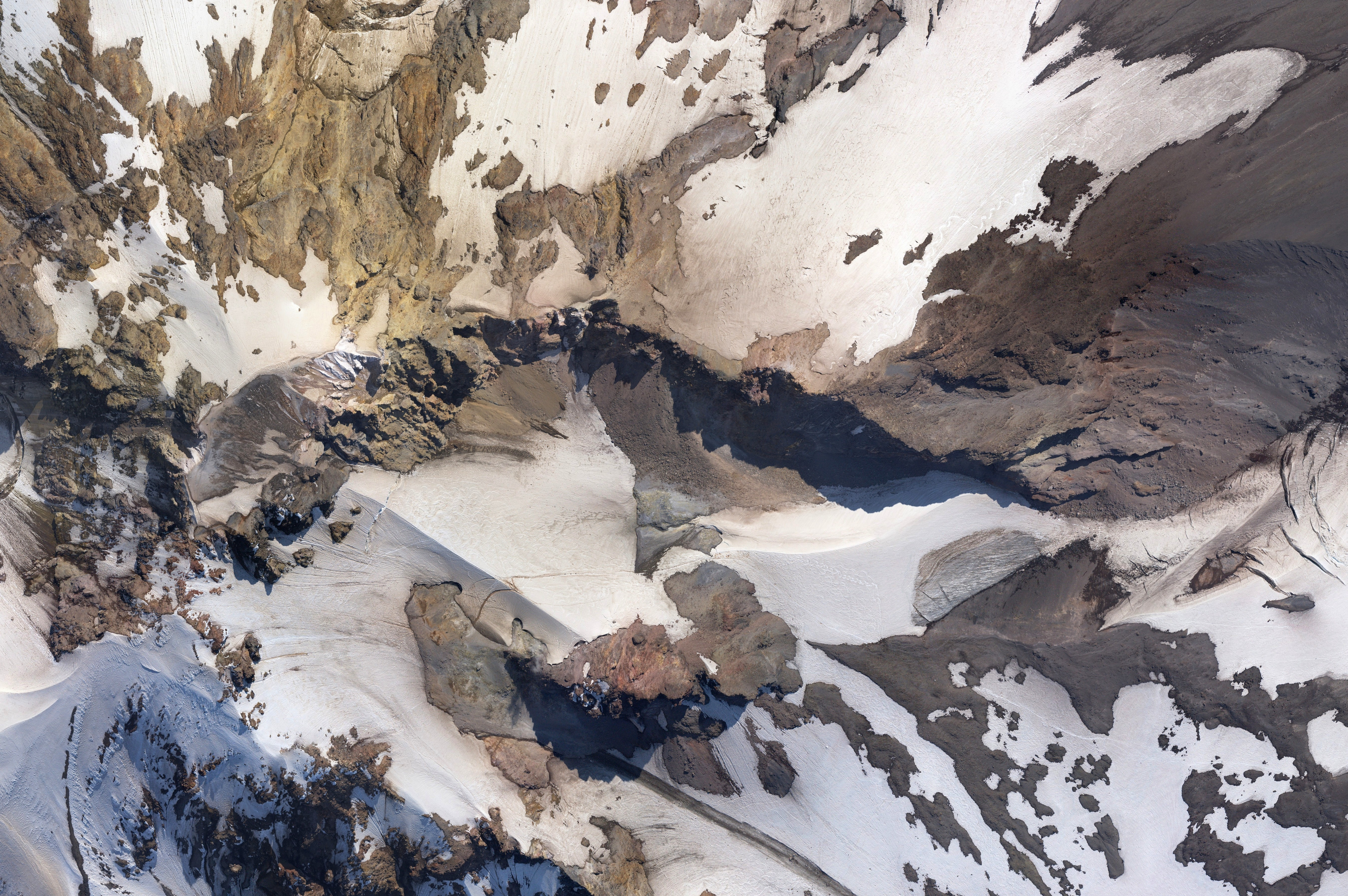
Aerial mosaic photo of summit crater: left is north, the Bergschrunde and Hogsback left of center

=== 2010s ===
On June 16, 2010, five climbers with ski gear hiked up Snow Dome, a popular wilderness back-country area on the north side, intending to ski down. Bad weather rolled in causing poor visibility and strong winds. One climber, Robert Dale Wiebe from Canada, was separated and accidentally traversed Coe Glacier where he apparently fell 700 feet (210 m) to his death.

On July 7, 2010, a 25-year-old male climber had successfully summited. During the initial descent, he lost footing near Hot Rocks and was unable to stop, injuring his knee and elbow. Nearby climbers provided first aid until rescuers and paramedics arrived and stabilized him. He was loaded into a sled and lowered down with an improvised arrangement of rope and pulley systems.

On July 24, 2010, a 54-year-old male from Arizona fell from the Hogsback and fractured or dislocated an ankle and received abrasions from sliding down granular ice. The victim was airlifted to a Portland hospital.

On January 22, 2011, three friends summitted successfully in the afternoon, but one broke his crampon during descent. At 5 p.m., his partners continued down without him separating from him at Crater Rock. They notified authorities when he did not return, reporting he lacked a light and overnight gear though he had "a beacon" from REI, but did not know what it was, but said he would "pull the knob" if something happened. The sheriff called for search assistance, and since Portland Mountain Rescue was already in the area for a winter bivouac exercise, they conducted an MLU search at 8 p.m. and quickly identified a signal from White River Canyon. It was a clear night near freezing with winds at 20 miles per hour (32 km/h). Night ski lighting from Skibowl and Timberline Ski Area was clearly visible when they located the victim east of Palmer Glacier at 7,700 feet (2,300 m) around midnight in light garments. They treated with warm clothing, liquids, and heat packs and took him back to Timberline.

Late on February 20, 2011, a snowboarder was reported lost on Mount Hood. Initial information and cell phone tracking indicated he was northwest of Zig Zag Canyon. Five searchers were unable to find him that night though visibility improved during the evening. The next morning had better conditions and involved many more searchers. He was found by a National Guard helicopter, which airlifted him to Timberline Lodge, cold but in good spirits. As rescuers were debriefing with a sheriff, a call for assistance arrived from a 13-year-old male snowboarder who was out-of-bounds below the Timberline Ski Area. He was found within 20 minutes of the call, given hot drink and food, and escorted to Timberline's first aid room.

On October 8, 2011, Lidiya Russu had been reported missing for two days when her vehicle was discovered abandoned in the Mount Hood National Forest. This triggered a search on the mountain that lasted many days and ended when her body was discovered on October 15. Authorities later determined that she died of hypothermia.

On February 7, 2012, experienced climber Jared Townsley, 31 or 32, of Tigard, Oregon, was found dead at the 9,200-foot (2,800 m) level at the base of a cliff with injuries consistent with a severe fall. With as many as 12 to 15 Mount Hood summits, he began climbing around midnight Sunday, February 5, a common tactic to summit at dawn. Other climbers reported seeing him descending near Crater Rock at 8:30 a.m. When he did not return as planned by 11 a.m., volunteers searched throughout the night in mild temperatures, light wind, and with a full moon, and found his body Tuesday morning.

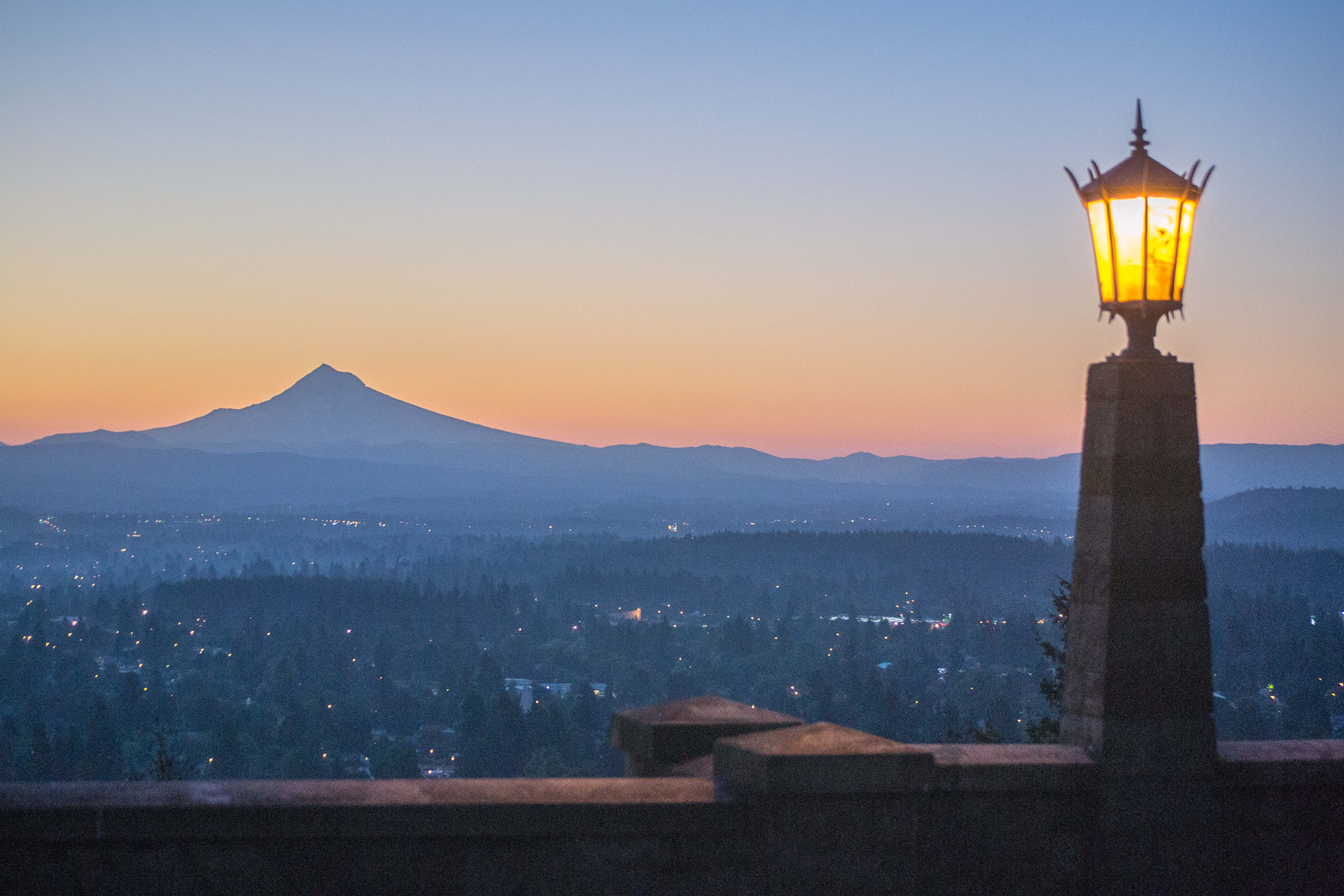
Mount Hood sunrise silhouette seen from Portland's Rocky Butte

At about 5:20 a.m. on June 14, 2012, solo climber Mark Cartier, 56, of Portland, Oregon, died due to injuries sustained by falling from a point above and west of the Hogsback—at around the 11,000-foot (3,400 m) level—into the Hot Rocks area west of Crater Rock. He was descending the mountain at the time of the fall and reportedly slid 1,000 feet (300 m) out of control, coming to rest amid a large debris field. His body was recovered by rescuers just before 1 p.m. Weather was good but the freezing level was at about 10,000 feet (3,000 m) contributing to dicey surface conditions. Cartier was an experienced rock climber, climbed mountains around the world, and had summited Mount Hood hundreds of times.

On Sunday, March 24, 2013, college student Mary Owen set out in the early morning hours to complete a solo climb. She was supposed to be a part of a group climb, but when the leader of her group canceled the climb due to what he thought would be bad weather, Owen decided to climb alone. As she climbed higher, whiteout conditions set in, and approximately 1,000 vertical feet (300 m) from the summit she decided to turn back. Disoriented due to the conditions she became lost and, attempting to climb out of canyon, she slipped and fell about 40 feet (12 m), severely spraining her right ankle and suffering a puncture wound to her inner left thigh. Unable to walk, she was stranded on the mountain for six nights, surviving on a one day's worth of snacks. Though she registered to climb, some mishap caused her information to be lost and she was not reported missing until Thursday, March 28. She was found alive on Saturday, March 30, by an Oregon Army National Guard Blackhawk helicopter rescue crew and flown directly to a hospital. Aside from her ankle injuries, she suffered frostbite in her feet and toes, but recovered fully.

On June 22, 2013, experienced climber Dr. Kinley Adams, a Salem family dentist, set out for a day climb as part of training preparation for a planned climbing trip to Nepal. He parked and registered at Timberline, and set out solo, but did not return as planned at 3:30 p.m. Searching began at 5:00 a.m. the next day, but was limited by low clouds, light rain, and worsening weather, which turned to winter conditions for the next few days. Search and rescue aircraft found his body a week later, and it was recovered the following day by a highly technical mission due to dangerous snow and slope conditions. Death occurred from multiple injuries caused by falling.

July 23, 2013, Cole Hancock, age 10, hiking with his dad, Kim Hancock, fell 150 feet (46 m) off of a cliff on Mount Hood. Brain damaged, initially, Cole couldn't speak one word, but two days later was speaking in whole sentences. He was treated at Doernbecher Children's Hospital.

On August 3, 2013, six snowboarders were scouting a location to shoot video. They were exploring an area of White River Glacier at about 8,100 feet (2,500 m) elevation when they found a natural tunnel in ice and walked through it. The first, Collin Backowski, 25, a coach at High Cascade Snowboard Camp from Pine, Colorado, was caught by the tunnel collapsing. The other five avoided injury. Backowski's body was recovered the next day.

On August 12, 2013, 32-year-old Sebastian Kinasiewicz of Poland apparently summited from the Tilly Jane trailhead on the northeast side of the mountain, but fell to his death near the summit.

May 14, 2014, a priest—Father Robert Cormier, age 57, of St. Patrick's and Assumption All Saints in Jersey City, New Jersey—fell 1,000 feet (300 m) to his death on Mount Hood.

On June 4, 2015, Ward Milo Maxfield, a 66-year-old experienced climber from Paul, Idaho, was leading his 17-year-old grandson and a group of other climbers when he fell 400 feet (120 m) feet to his death.

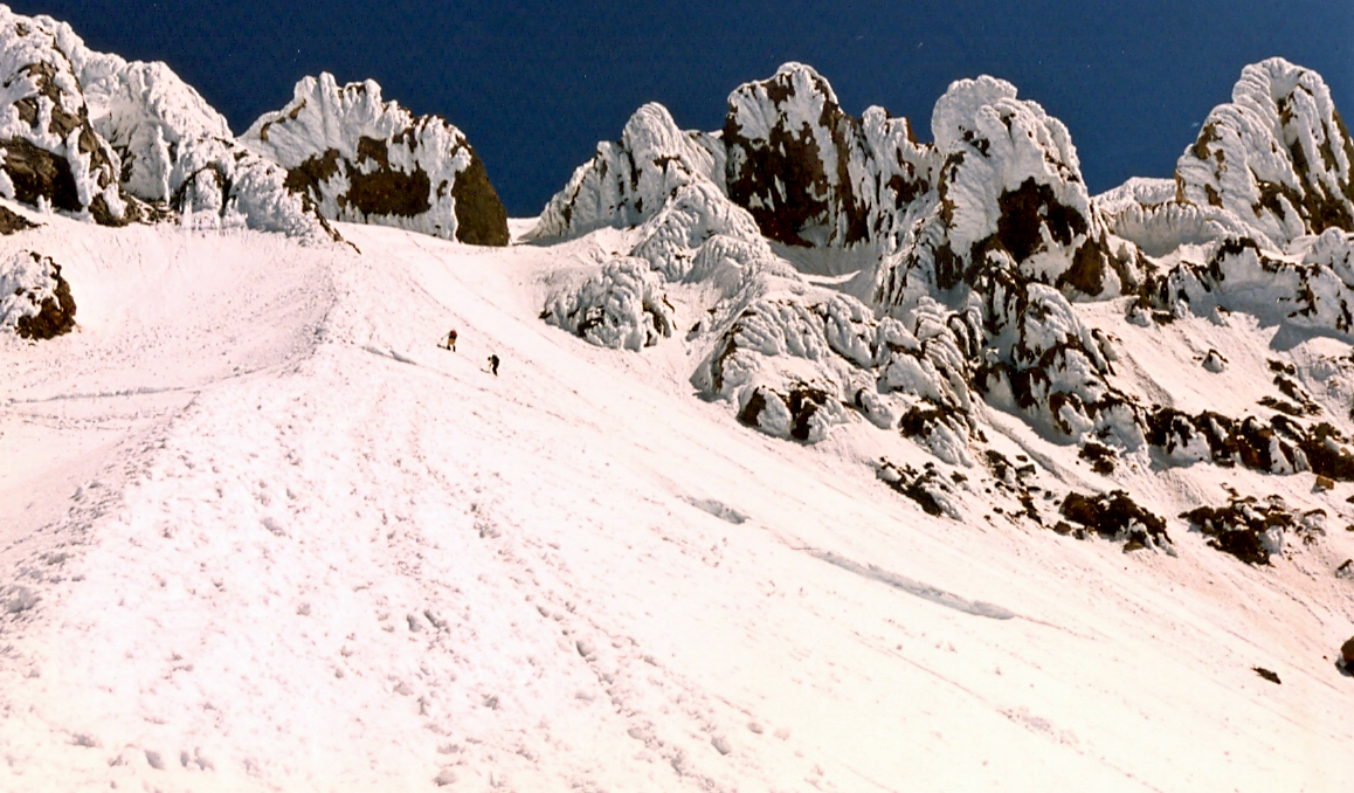
Two climbers ascending the Hogsback and approaching the Pearly Gates

On May 7, 2017, John Thorton Jenkins, a 32-year-old experienced climber from Seattle, Washington, was heading for the summit when he slid down steep terrain near the Hogsback. He sustained serious injuries and was treated by search and rescue teams, who had him flown to a Portland hospital, but he was pronounced dead on arrival at the hospital.

On August 12, 2017, two 19-year-old college students, Emma Place and Emily Lang, fell to their deaths from a cliff while hiking on the Pacific Crest Trail. The women had set up camp at the top of a waterfall, with a tent and backpacks. It appeared that they lost their footing on the slippery rocks and fell. The two had met in 2008 as students at Laurelhust Elementary in Portland and became best friends. They graduated from St. Mary's Academy in 2016. Each had completed her freshman year—Place at Gonzaga University and Lang at Western Washington University.

On February 13, 2018, 35-year-old Miha Sumi of Portland fell 700–1,000 feet (210–300 m) on Hogsback, was critically injured, rescued, but subsequently died. Sumi was among a group of four climbers; Sumi and Matt Zavortink had reached the summit, while the other two waited on Hogsback. The group encountered tumbling ice and rocks, causing Sumi's fall. Zavortink and other climbers in the area reached Sumi and performed CPR for about 90 minutes until a Blackhawk helicopter arrived and rescued him. He was flown to Legacy Emanuel Medical Center in Portland but was declared dead upon arrival.

On October 8, 2018, an Arizona State University graduate student, 30-year-old David Yaghmourian, was reported missing on the mountain. He and a friend were hiking on the Timberline Trail when he stopped to "take some extra breaks". Yaghmourian sent the friend on ahead and said he'd catch up with him at the Timberline Lodge, which, as it turned out, was only about half-an-hour away. Despite the clear visibility, Yaghmourian never arrived. A search effort was activated along the trail, but he was not found. Three days later, his body was discovered by a hiker at about 8,300-foot (2,500 m) elevation, some 3,000 feet (910 m) higher than the official search area. He apparently had made a wrong turn on the trail, less than an hour from the lodge, and became lost. Yaghmourian ended up going North away from the trail, eventually following a path up the mountain as he tried to locate the lodge. A police spokesman said even proficient hikers "unfamiliar with the terrain" can experience this kind of disorientation. Night conditions were harsh, with "heavy rain and freezing temperatures". It appears that he was trying to set up a tent, fell 30 feet, and succumbed to hypothermia.

=== 2020s ===
On October 26, 2020, Austin Mishler, 27, of Bend was camping on Mount Hood and planned to climb the Eliot Glacier area the next day before returning home. When family and friends did not hear from Mishler, an experienced climber and wilderness guide, they alerted authorities. After a two-day search in difficult conditions, his body was discovered in a crevasse at about 9,400-foot (2,900 m) elevation on the north side of the mountain.

On May 30, 2021, Patrick Stretch was descending the popular Old Chute Route with his son when he fell nearly 500 feet (150 m). The 64-year-old climber was near the summit at around the 10,500-foot (3,200 m) level. Some witnesses called 911 and a rescue effort was undertaken. The climber had fallen into an area with many fumaroles that emit hydrogen sulfide and other toxic gasses. As such, crews had to monitor toxic gas levels and navigate difficult terrain, as they used ropes to reach the climber. Rescue crews declared the man dead upon reaching him.

On March 6, 2022, two climbers were in Mount Hood's Leuthold Couloir area when they fell about 200 feet (61 m). Pradnya Mohite, 34, of Issaquah, Washington, died; Lei Wang, 50, of Renton, Washington, was critically injured. Rescue efforts began that night. However, due to high winds and avalanche risk, the climbers could not be reached until late the next day.

On June 24, 2022, a 31-year-old woman from Portland fell several hundred feet while climbing near the Old Chute area, sustaining serious injuries. Other climbers on the mountain were able to call 911 and notify responders of the incident. A medical doctor who happened to be on the mountain rendered medical aid. Search and rescue crews, including teams from Clackamas County Sheriff's Office, Portland Mountain Rescue, Hood River Crag Rats, AMR's Reach and Treat Team, and the Oregon Office of Emergency Management, were deployed to the mountain to assist in the rescue. At around 10 a.m., rescue crews reached the injured climber and took over patient care. Shortly thereafter, an Oregon Army National Guard helicopter arrived at the location and hoisted the patient into the aircraft. The climber was then transported to a nearby hospital for medical treatment.

On July 4, 2022, a 43-year-old man from Happy Valley, Oregon fell around 700 feet from the Old Chute area after losing his ice axe. A rescue team reached the injured climber at around 10:30 a.m. Later, an Oregon Army National Guard helicopter landed near the injured climber around 1 p.m., lowered a litter, and airlifted the patient to a nearby hospital in Portland.

On December 13, 2025, a 26 year old man with two partners were climbing the Wy'East Face route. The two partners decided to turn back, and the man continued. He never made it back to the trailhead. His body was discovered three days later below the Newton Clark Headwall.

On January 25, 2026, a 30 year old man from Portland, Oregon and his climbing partner were attempting a free solo of the Devil's Kitchen Headwall, when the man fell around 300 feet. Other climbers witnessed the fall and called 911. Members from Portland Mountain Rescue were already on the mountain doing training and arrived quickly, but the man was already deceased. According to friends, the man only had previous experience with non-technical climbs.

== See also ==
- 2014 Nepal snowstorm disaster
- List of deaths on eight-thousanders
- List of mountaineering disasters by death toll
- List of Mount Everest death statistics
- List of people who died climbing Mount Everest
