= 1986 Mount Hood disaster =

Mountaineering disaster

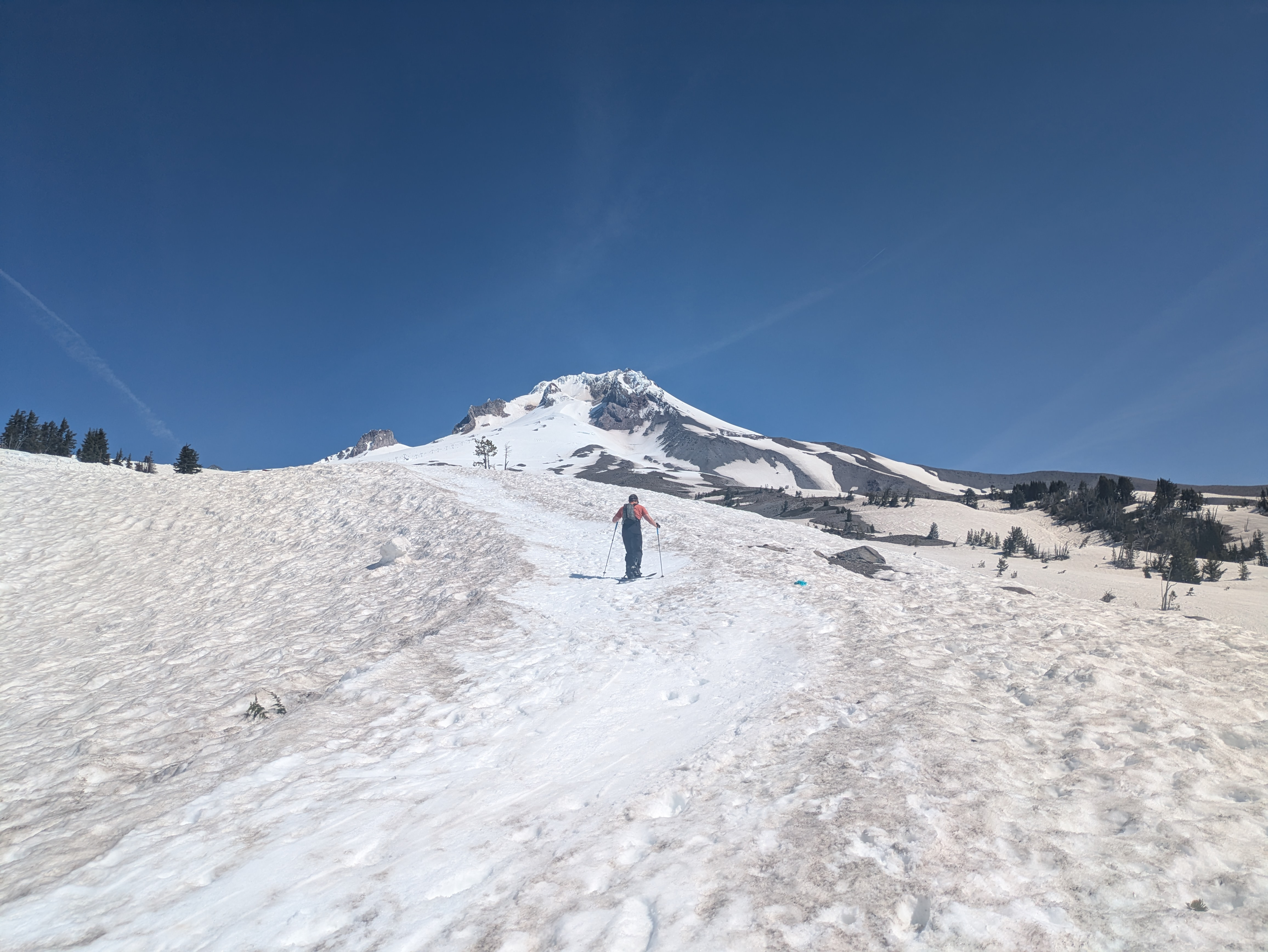
- Mount Hood viewed from the climber's trail just above Timberline Lodge in May
- Date: 12–13 May 1986
- Location: Mount Hood (Oregon)
- Organised by: Oregon Episcopal School
- Deaths: 9

In May 1986, seven students and two members of staff from Oregon Episcopal School died during an excursion on Mount Hood. The students were participating in an adventure program required by the school for sophomores. The disaster is the second deadliest alpine accident in North American history, behind an avalanche in 1981 on Mount Rainier which claimed eleven lives.

== Expedition ==
The students were participating in Basecamp, a program run by the school following the principles of Outward Bound, and required for all tenth graders. Led by Thomas Goman, the school's chaplain, the expedition set off from Timberline Lodge, just west of the route up Mount Hood, on Monday May 12, 1986, at 2:30 a.m. The forecast predicted a multi-day storm, but Goman believed that the climb would be complete before the worst of the weather hit. The party consisted of 20 people: 15 students, a student's mother, Goman, Dean of Students Marion Horwell, and two guides, Dee Zduniak from Outward Bound and Ralph Summers.

Student Hilary Spray and her mother Sharon turned back early in the climb because Hilary was suffering from a stomach ache. Four more students named Lorca Smetana, Courtney Boatsman, John Whitson, and Michael Garrett, along with Zduniak turned around shortly after. According to a statement written by Summers after their rescue, bad weather suddenly arrived in the two-hour period after Zduniak turned back. Summers was eventually able to convince Goman to turn back, but by then the storm arrived and conditions were deteriorating rapidly.

Because of poor visibility and disorienting conditions, the group descended off course, moving nearly sideways across the mountain. With evening approaching, Summers constructed a snow cave. The cave was not large enough to hold everyone, and the accumulating snowfall built up over the entrance, obstructing the air flow and restricting access. Summers and a student, Molly Schula, set off for help after first light on Tuesday morning, arriving at Mount Hood Meadows, two miles east of Timberline Lodge, a few hours later. The rest of the group waited at the snow cave, with three students possibly attempting to descend on their own.

== Rescue ==
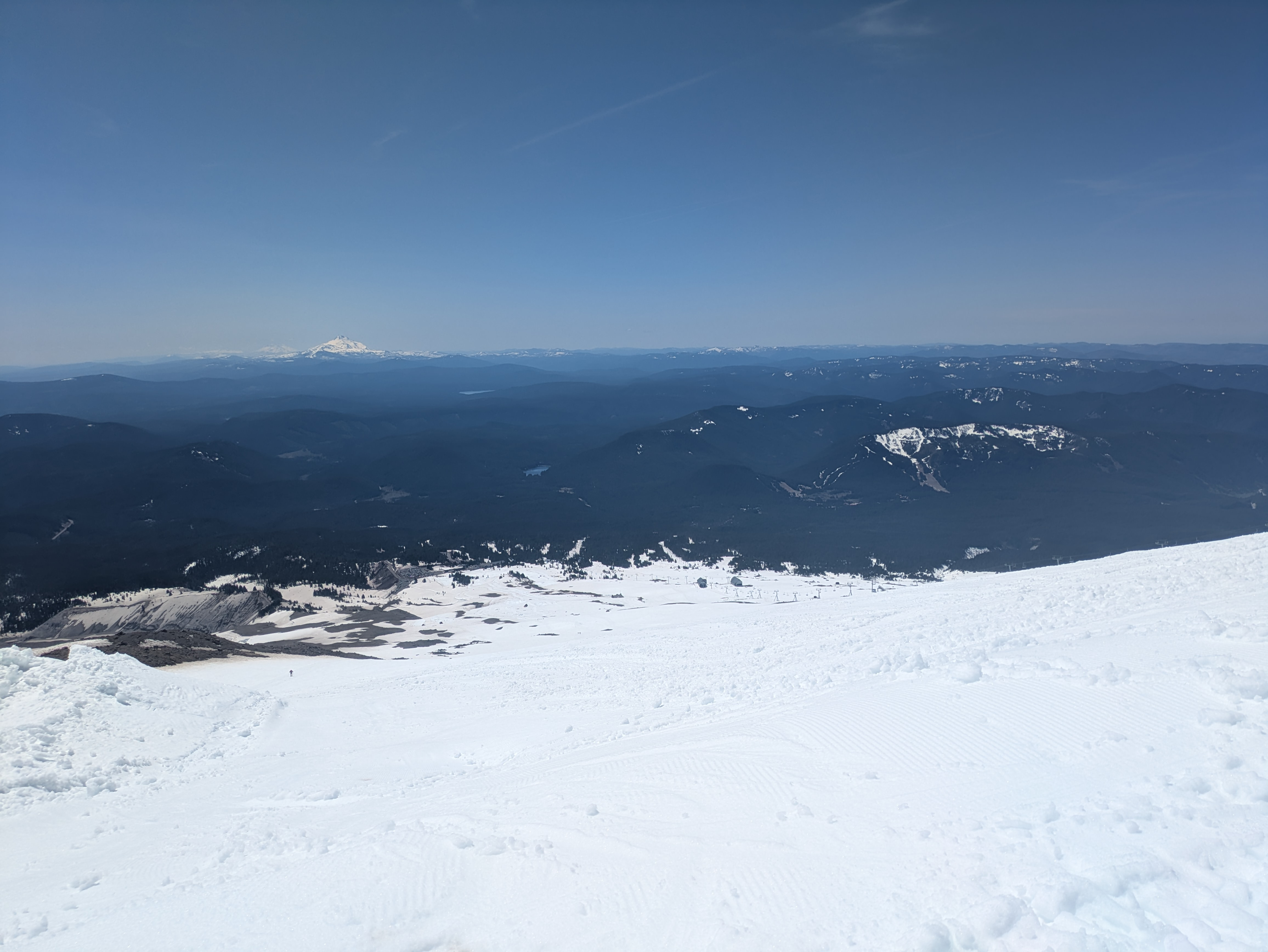
Looking south from near where the snow cave was discovered, May 2025

The Portland Mountain Rescue arrived at the Timberline Lodge shortly after 5 a.m. on Tuesday, May 13, alerted to potential trouble on Mount Hood involving student climbers who had not arrived back as expected. The rescuers faced difficult weather conditions, with strong winds overturning a Sno-Cat. On Wednesday morning, a team of rescuers found the bodies of the three students who were outside the snow cave. The team searched nearby for other survivors, using avalanche probes to locate a snow cave. The team was pulled from this location, and redirected after Summers went up in a helicopter to offer guidance on where he thought the survivors were located.

Later on Wednesday, Richard Harder, a master sergeant with the Air Force Reserve's 304th Aerospace Rescue and Recovery Squadron, a unit of Air Force pararescuers, determined that the search teams were looking in the wrong area, marked a probable search field with a flare from a helicopter, and set up a line of rescuers to use avalanche poles to search for survivors. The snow cave was located on Wednesday evening. Helicopters rushed the victims to area hospitals, where doctors and medical staff attempted treatment. There were two survivors from the cave, Brinton Clark and Giles Thompson; Thompson had to have both legs amputated.

== Fatalities ==
- Tasha Amy (15)
- Thomas Goman (42)
- Richard Haeder Jr. (16)
- Marion Horwell (40)
- Alison Litzenberger (15)
- Susan McClave (17)
- Patrick McGinness (15)
- Erin O'Leary (16)
- Erik Sandvik (15)

== Aftermath ==
The school commissioned an official inquest, which assigned blame primarily to Goman for failing to turn back in the face of bad weather. Settlements were offered to the families of seven students who died, and one family filed a wrongful death lawsuit in September 1986. The school commemorates the event annually in May of each year.

== See also ==
- Mount Hood climbing accidents
- List of mountaineering disasters in North America by death toll
