= Oregon Episcopal School =

Private boarding school in Portland, Oregon, United States

Location
- 6300 SW Nicol Road; Portland, Washington County, Oregon 97223; United States; 45°28′27″N 122°45′22″W

Information
- Type: Private, Boarding
- Religious affiliation: Episcopalian
- Opened: 1869 (as St. Helens Hall)
- CEEB code: 380915
- Head of school: Michael Spencer
- Grades: Pre-K–12
- Enrollment: 875 (2020–21)
- Campus: Suburban, 59 acres (240,000 m^{2})
- Colors: Forest green, white, and Carolina blue
- Slogan: Always Open
- Athletics conference: OSAA Lewis & Clark League 3A-1
- Mascot: Aardvark
- Accreditation: NAIS
- Newspaper: The Dig
- Website: oes.edu

Oregon Episcopal School (OES) is an American independent, coeducational, college preparatory, day and boarding school in the Raleigh Hills area of Portland, Oregon. It was preceded by St. Helen's Hall, a day and boarding school for girls established in 1869. OES was established in 1972 when the girls school merged with Bishop Dagwell Hall.

== History ==
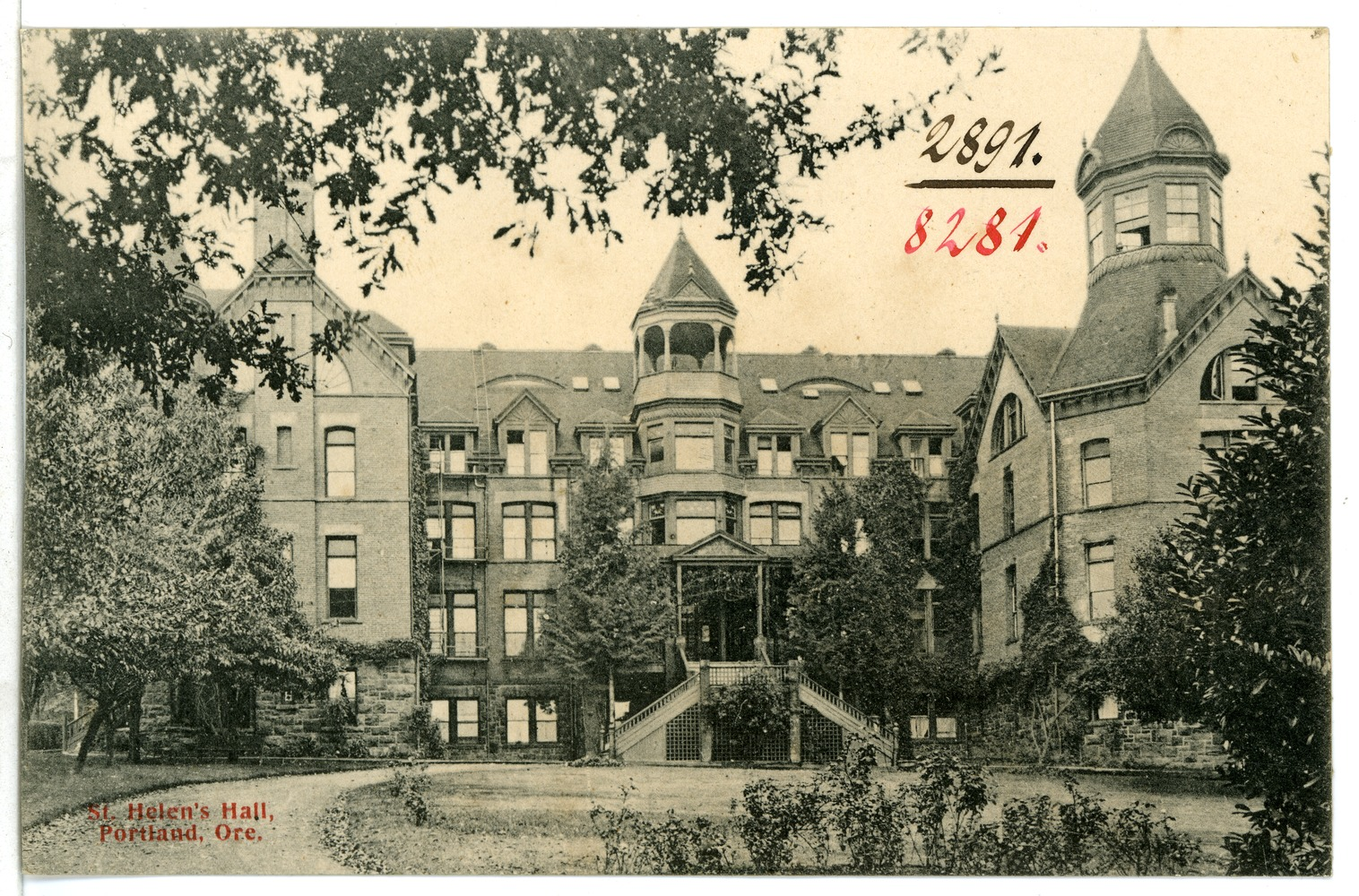
St. Helen's Hall (1906)

Oregon Episcopal School (OES) was known as St. Helen's Hall at the time of its founding and was originally a boarding and day school for girls. It was established in 1869 in Portland, Oregon by the Rt. Rev. Benjamin Wistar Morris, Bishop of Oregon, and is "the oldest Episcopal school west of the Rocky Mountains."

OES's original site at 4th and Madison is now the location of Portland's City Hall. The school moved several times during its first century to different locations in downtown Portland. It was located at 13th and Hall Streets before moving to its present location in the Raleigh Hills neighborhood of Portland in 1964. The Bishop Dagwell Hall was soon added, expanding the academic program to boys.

In 1972, St. Helen's Hall merged with Bishop Dagwell Hall to become Oregon Episcopal School. Currently, the school serves children from prekindergarten through 12th grade and includes day-school and boarding programs.

A number of facilities have been added over the years. Meyer Hall was built in 1996 as a new facility for Middle School students; the Drinkward Center for Math, Science and Technology opened in 2003; and in 2016 a 45,000-square-foot Lower School facility opened for Pre-K through 5th grade students. Today, approximately 870 students in Pre-K through Grade 12 attend OES.

== Academics ==
The Beginning, Lower, and Middle schools consist entirely of day students, but the Upper School includes a boarding program. Approximately one-fifth of the Upper School's student body resides on campus, and around three-fourths of those boarding students hail from outside the United States.

In 2014, Oregon Episcopal School was ranked the best high school in the state of Oregon and the 13th best private school in the United States. OES ranked No. 2 on Oregon's 25 Best K-12 Schools for 2018, according to the Portland Business Journal.

=== Science research ===
OES's research-based science program has a long history of success in science research competitions. Over the years, many students have placed highly in prestigious competitions such as the Intel Science Talent Search, the Siemens Competition, the Davidson Fellows Scholarship, the Google Science Fair, the Intel International Science and Engineering Fair, the Stockholm Junior Water Prize, the International Sustainable World Energy Engineering Environment Project Olympiad, the BioGENEius Competition, and the National Junior Science & Humanities Symposium. Since 1995, 19 students have been named Intel National Semifinalists and National Finalists with one senior National Finalist contestant placed 2nd nationally among 40 national finalists in 2003 and one senior National Finalist contestant placed 3rd nationally in 2004. Since 2002, 36 students have been named Siemens National Semifinalists, Regional Finalists and National Finalists. In 2010, juniors Akash Krishnan and Matthew Fernandez placed 1st nationally in the team category and won the Siemens Competition. Also in 2013, Ajay Krishnan was named the recipient of a prestigious $10,000 Davidson Fellows Scholarship, the top honor in the engineering category. He was also named a regional finalist in the Google Science Fair. In 2021 OES's aerospace team beat 614 rocketry teams from across North America to win the American Rocketry Challenge.

=== Academic championships ===
- Oregon Style Cross‐Examination Debate: 2016
- Oregon Battle of the Books: 2012, 2013, 2014, 2015
- Speech and Debate: 2018, 2021

== Facilities ==
OES's 59-acre campus lies in the hills of Southwest Portland. Facilities include:

- Meyer Hall: Built in 1996 for Middle School students. Topped by a "green" roof with soil and plants in 2006.
- Drinkward Center for Math, Science and Technology: Opened in 2003. Serves as a facility for STEM related fields in the Upper School.
- Bishop Dagwell Hall: This is OES's fine arts building. This building was the boys school at OES that later merged with St Helens Hall in 1960 to form OES.
- Lower School: The 45,000-square-foot facility for Pre-K through 5th grade students was completed in 2016. The design earned a Portland Architecture Award in 2018.
- Fariss Hall: This building was the old OES lower school, but due to the new lower school building being constructed in 2016 Fariss Hall is now a shared space with three main areas. This building was initially slated for demolition after the lower school was constructed, but due to the need for more space this never happened. These are:
  - EC3 Design Center: Founded in 2017 this facilities mission statement is to cultivate curiosity and creativity while collaborating with peers. This facility is used by the whole school and is composed of three rooms: Think (lounge), Make (Maker space) and Move (used for performance arts).
  - Fariss Hall Athletics: Fariss Hall athletics is composed of an exercise gym and a dance studio.
  - Lower School: Some lower school classes are still held in parts of Ferris Hall.
- Jackson and Rodney Houses: Founded in 1963 these are OESs two student dormitories. As a boarding school OES houses 60 boarding students.
- OES Athletic Center: Opened in September 2021, this 41,905 square-foot building can hold the entire student body and faculty. The newly expanded space includes two full-size gymnasiums: one named after alumnus and former athletic director Kris Van Hatcher and the other named after the Morissette family, donors to the athletic center. The athletic center houses the physical education and athletic departments, in addition to serving as a multipurpose venue for the entire school community. Interior finishes include polished concrete floors and a stair screen made of clear-vertical-grain cedar. Exposed, glue-laminated columns and beams are made of Douglas fir. The athletic center is designed to be energy efficient, featuring passive cooling strategies and limited mechanical cooling.

== Accreditation and memberships ==
OES is accredited by the Northwest Association of Independent Schools, and is a member of the National Association of Independent Schools, the National Association of Episcopal Schools, and the Association of Boarding Schools.

== Athletics ==
OES has a long tradition of sports, competing under the supervision of the Oregon Schools Activities Association. The school has claimed over 65 championships since 1983. Upper School teams include basketball, soccer, lacrosse, volleyball, fencing, tennis, golf, cross country, track and field, and ski racing. Middle and Lower School students also compete in a variety of team sports.

Across the Portland area and the state of Oregon itself, Oregon Episcopal School is best known for its historically strong programs in lacrosse, fencing, ski racing, and recently soccer and track and field.

Due to lacrosse and ski racing not being OSAA sanctioned sports, OES’s teams compete in a separate classification from 3A in these sports. As a result, they compete against larger 6A schools in these two sports. Lacrosse specifically has earned the bulk of the school’s recognition for this reason - a 3A school consistently winning championships and beating 6A schools is uncommon.

Oregon Episcopal School's traditional athletic rival is Catlin Gabel School.

=== Mascot ===
OES's official mascot is an Aardvark, chosen by the student body to replace their previous mascot, a falcon. At one time an eagle was also a mascot at the school.

In 2013, the mascot placed second in the West in USA Today's High School Sports' Best Mascot competition.

=== State championships ===
- Men's lacrosse: 2004, 2009, 2017, 2018, 2023
- Women's lacrosse: 2017
- Men's soccer: 2005, 2006, 2007, 2009, 2013, 2014, 2022
- Women's soccer: 1993, 2005, 2011, 2012, 2014, 2015, 2016, 2017, 2018
- Women's volleyball: 2006
- Women's cross country: 1988, 2023, 2024
- Men's golf: 2019, 2022, 2023
- Women's golf: 2019, 2022, 2023
- Men's tennis: 1983, 1984, 1993, 1994, 2006, 2007, 2008, 2009, 2012, 2013, 2014, 2015, 2016, 2017, 2018
- Women's tennis: 1984, 1985, 1986, 1993, 1995, 2008, 2009, 2010, 2012, 2013, 2014, 2017, 2018, 2023
- Men's basketball: 2020

== Mount Hood disaster ==
One of the worst climbing accidents in U.S. history occurred in May 1986 when seven sophomore students and two faculty froze to death while climbing Mount Hood while participating in an adventure program required by the school. Of the four survivors, three had life-threatening injuries, and one had his legs amputated. The OES disaster spurred the development of the Mountain Locator Unit, an inexpensive transmitter which helps searchers find climbers in distress. OES participates in a day of service in observance of the disaster each year on the second Wednesday of May.

== Notable alumni ==
- Alma Francis – Broadway and silent film actress
- Peter Holmstrom, 1987 – musician, The Dandy Warhols
- Betsy Johnson - member of the Oregon House of Representatives and Oregon Senate
- Tianhui Michael Li, 2003 – Data scientist and Tech entrepreneur
- Harriet Fitch Luckett, a teacher who served as one of the first women to serve in the Idaho House of Representatives
- Vivian Marshall, 1906 – vaudeville and film actress
- Clara C. Munson, 1880 – mayor of Warrenton, Oregon and one of the state's earliest women elected to office
- John Robinson, 2005 – actor
- Ben Westlund, 1967 – Oregon State Treasurer
- Virginia Euwer Wolff, 1955 – writer
- Yunha Kim - 2007, Founder of Simple Habit, Sleep Reset, Locket, current chairwoman of Sleep Reset
