= 1967 Mount McKinley disaster =

Mountaineering disaster

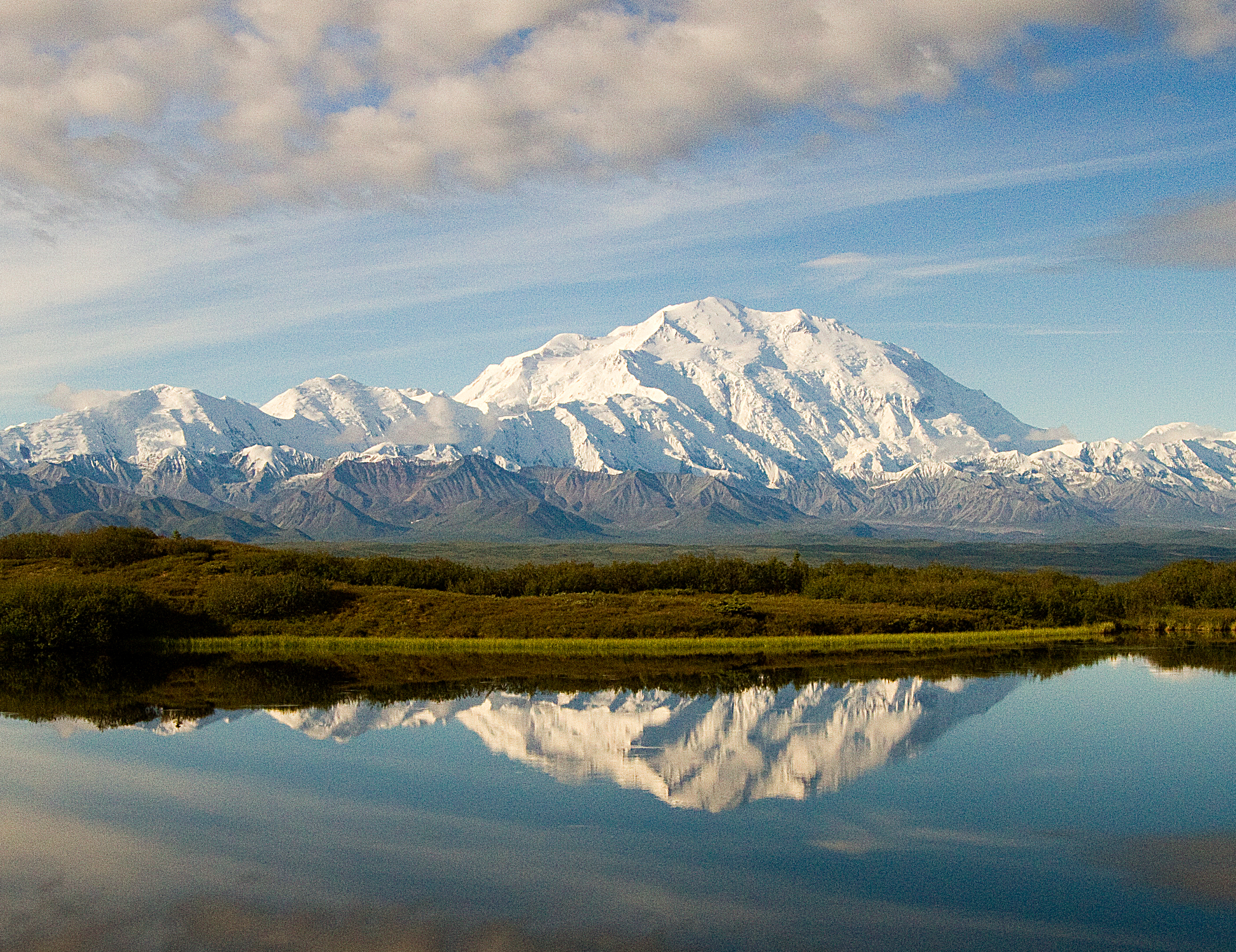
- Denali viewed from the north, with Reflection Pond in the foreground
- Date: 17–24 July 1967
- Location: Denali (Note: Denali was officially known as Mount McKinley by both the Alaskan and United States governments at this time.) (Alaska)
- Organised by: The Wilcox Expedition
- Deaths: 7

The 1967 Mount McKinley disaster occurred in July 1967 when seven climbers died on Denali (also known as Mount McKinley) while attempting to descend from the summit in a severe blizzard estimated to be the worst to occur on the mountain in 100 years. The accident is the deadliest to occur on Denali and was at the time one of the deadliest mountaineering accidents in history.

== Background ==
The expedition to climb Denali was organized by Joe Wilcox, a 24-year old graduate student at Brigham Young University. To attract climbers to join the expedition, Wilcox mailed out newsletters and advertised a joining fee of $300 to cover food and gear expenses. Wilcox managed to sign on eight men to join his expedition: Jerry Clark (age 31), Steve Taylor (age 22), Dennis Luchterhand (age 24), Mark McLaughlin (age 23), Anshel Schiff (age 30), Hank Janes (age 25), John Russell (age 23), and Walt Taylor (age 24).

The expedition's application to climb the mountain was met with skepticism from the National Park Service at Denali National Park and Preserve due to the climbers' inexperience in high altitude. While all members of the team were familiar with basic mountaineering practices, none had ascended a peak higher than 15,000 feet (4,600 m), while Denali's summit is at 20,310 feet (6,190 m). As such, park rangers recommended that the Wilcox Expedition merge with a more experienced climbing group from Colorado led by Howard Snyder, who intended to climb the mountain at the same time. Snyder's group initially consisted of four men: Snyder (age 22), brothers Jerry (age 31) and Steve Lewis, and Paul Schlichter (age 22). The four intended to climb by themselves, but shortly before leaving for Alaska, Steve Lewis was injured in a traffic accident and was unable to climb. With his team now below the Park Service's mandated four-person minimum, Snyder agreed to join Wilcox's expedition. It was now a 12-member team attempting to climb the mountain. The Park Service approved the expedition's application to climb, with caveats that team members purchase and carry radios with them on the climb, that the experienced climbers of the Colorado group had to stay with the less experienced climbers of Wilcox's group, and that less experienced climbers had to take training courses to prepare for the high elevation and rugged terrain they would be experiencing.

== Events ==
The climbers began their ascent of the mountain on June 22. The expedition climbed the mountain from the north via the Karsten's Ridge route across the Muldrow Glacier, a less-expensive route up the mountain but more remote and much less used than the standard West Buttress route. Despite most men in the team suffering from some level of altitude sickness, the climbers made good progress up the mountain and by July 13 had established a camp at 15,000 feet (4,600 m). At this point, some reports indicate Park Service Rangers contacted the team to inform them of a large storm developing that was projected to hit the mountain somewhere from July 16 to 17. Wilcox, however, claimed that no advanced notice of a potential storm was communicated to the team. Regardless of this potential discrepancy, weather was projected to be clear for the next few days and so the expedition continued on. The next day, eight members of the team moved higher up the mountain to establish their final camp at 18,000 feet (5,500 m), with the intent of pushing for the summit on the 15th. The start of this climb was delayed when a malfunctioning stove caused one of the expedition's tents to catch fire, but the high camp was established by 7:00 p.m. that evening.

On July 15, four members of the team set out from the high camp for the summit at noon - Wilcox, Snyder, Lewis, and Schlichter. The remaining members who had climbed the previous day remained at the high camp to rest, while the four members at the previous camp ascended to the high camp. Except for occasional stops to allow Lewis to rest, the team of four made good progress and reached the summit at roughly 6:30 p.m. Schlichter described near-perfect weather conditions at the summit, with exceptional views, low wind, and temperatures at roughly 6 °F (−14 °C). After spending about an hour and a half at the summit, the group descended and returned to the high camp at about 9:50 p.m. The next day, July 16, strong winds at approximately 70 miles per hour (110 km/h) buffeted the mountain, forcing all 12 team members to remain at the high camp for the day.

On July 17, the winds died down, and the team prepared to move. Seven members of the expedition - Clark, S. Taylor, W. Taylor, Luchterhand, McLaughlin, Janes, and Russell - would climb to the summit that day, while the four who had summited on the 15th climbed back down to the camp at 15,000 feet. Anshel Schiff also chose to descend despite not reaching the summit due to worsening effects of altitude sickness. Wilcox's group began descending at roughly 1:00 p.m., but Clark's group headed for the summit did not start until an unknown time after 2:00 p.m., an unexpectedly late start. Additionally, Steve Taylor, who had also been suffering badly from altitude sickness, elected not to climb and instead remain at the high camp.

At 8:00 p.m. that night, a storm hit the upper slopes of the mountain. Clark radioed rangers at the Eielson Visitor Center that they were still on the upper slopes of the mountain and unsure of where they were due to dense fog. They reported that they had decided to bivouac where they were and hope for better weather in the morning. At 11:30 a.m. on July 18, Clark radioed to the Visitor Center again, reporting that five of the climbers had reached the summit - himself, Taylor, Luchterhand, McLaughlin, and Janes. Russell had not made it to the summit and it was assumed he had turned back in the poor conditions in an attempt to return to the high camp. Clark also reported that the weather was still poor, with high winds and whiteout conditions. Clark stated the team intended to descend from the summit five to ten minutes after the radio call and that they would radio again at 8:00 p.m. after returning to their high camp. This transmission from the summit was the last contact with any of the team members who had ascended on the 17th.

Shortly after radio contact ended, the severity of the storm increased dramatically. A low pressure area from the north, bringing moisture and humidity, met with the high pressure area that had been in the area, creating a severe storm directly over the mountain. Initial estimates placed wind speeds in the range of 100 to 150 mph (160 to 240 km/h). Later models created by the National Weather Service indicated that winds near the summit were likely significantly stronger, approaching speeds of nearly 300 mph (480 km/h). Wilcox, in his book White Winds: America's Most Tragic Climb, published in 1981, concluded, based on lowland weather data collected, that the weather the seven climbers still on the high slopes on Denali faced may have been the worst conditions experienced by any mountaineers on record.

After two days of the storm and no further contact with climbers near the summit, the five who had descended to the camp at 15,000 feet became concerned about the condition of the rest of the team. On the morning of July 20, Wilcox, Snyder, and Schlichter attempted to climb back up to the high camp to look for the missing team members, but with weather conditions still poor, the trio made little progress and were forced to turn back at roughly 11:00 a.m. After returning to camp, there was a brief break in the weather, allowing for a view up the mountain. No signs of the missing climbers were visible, prompting an emergency call to the Park Service. Weather conditions deteriorated again that evening, preventing rescue efforts until the storm cleared.

The storm continued on the mountain for two more days. During this time, the five men at 15,000 feet came into strife themselves. They abandoned one of their tents and all stayed in one three-person tent to keep warm from their body heat. With no room to operate their stove in the cramped space, they were only able to eat foods that did not require cooking. Lewis and Schiff became very weak from the ordeal, while Wilcox and Snyder began suffering numbness in their toes and fingers, but were in relatively better shape.

On July 23, weather conditions finally improved, and the five men began descending to a camp at 12,100 feet (3,700 m). As they neared the camp, they received assistance and much needed food from climbers representing the Mountaineering Club of Alaska (MCA), who had weathered the storm at the lower elevation. The next day, the members of the MCA split up, with one member climbing down with the survivors to ensure they safely returned to base camp, while the remainder began their ascent of the mountain to search for the missing seven still on the high slopes.

== Rescue efforts ==
The five survivors of The Wilcox Expedition (Snyder's group, Wilcox and Schiff) reached base camp on July 25. Wilcox then crossed Wonder Lake to reach the Wonder Lake ranger station, which dispatched a helicopter to base camp to rescue the remaining survivors.

On July 28, the MCA members searching for the missing seven climbers reached the remnants of the Wilcox Expedition's high camp. There they found the remains of one of the climbers clutching a tent pole, having likely frozen to death in this position. The body had already started decomposing, as an exposed hand had appeared to have thawed and refrozen several times over the preceding days. This body was assumed to be that of Steve Taylor, who had remained at camp during the other climbers' ascent. However, with the poor condition of the remains, a positive identification was not made, and this assumption remains only speculation. Howard Snyder later theorized this body may have been that of John Russell, and that Taylor had died attempting to descend to 15,000 feet, as evidenced by Taylor's ice axe and sleeping bag being found near the Harper Icefall that lies between the two camps. The next day, the search party ascended farther up the mountain and found the remains of two more climbers at the base of Archdeacon's Tower. The bodies had not decomposed and were found sitting upright in a position that appeared to be bracing themselves against the wind. With the bodies badly frozen, these remains were also never identified. In a later interview about the incident, Paul Schlichter speculated that the two bodies found here were those of Dennis Luchterhand and Walt Taylor, who were the most fit of the group that perished. None of the other four remains were ever located. The three bodies found on the mountain were left behind, as no high-elevation recovery equipment existed at the time of the disaster.

In 1968, a humanitarian expedition climbed the mountain to find and bury all seven bodies. By this point, the remains found by the MCA members the previous year had disappeared and none of the seven climbers' remains were ever recovered.

== Aftermath ==
In the immediate aftermath of the incident, Bradford Washburn, one of the most well-known American mountaineering experts of the time, called the accident "U.S. mountaineering's worst disaster" and the result of both the awful weather conditions and poor tactical decisions by the climbers. After the disaster, the Park Service considered closing Denali to further climbing attempts, but ultimately decided against doing this.

Joe Wilcox came under heavy criticism as the leader of the expedition. Claims that he lacked effectiveness as a leader combined with his inexperience in high altitude settings led to him receiving much of the blame for the deaths that occurred. Wilcox initially accepted that fault for the accident did fall to him. Later studies conducted by the National Weather Service and the National Oceanic and Atmospheric Administration found that the storm conditions on the upper slopes of the mountain were not survivable by any person, thus absolving Wilcox. Snyder and Schlichter later came to the conclusion that fault for the accident fell more to the group that died for failure to make use of several days of good weather to push for the summit and for continuing to ascend despite the onset of bad weather.

In the years following the accident, multiple books were written detailing the ill-fated climb. Snyder and Wilcox both published books from personal experiences: In the Hall of the Mountain King: The True Story of a Tragic Climb, which Snyder published in 1973, and White Winds: America's Most Tragic Climb, which Wilcox published in 1981. In 2008, author James M. Tabor published Forever on the Mountain: The Truth Behind One of Mountaineering's Most Controversial and Mysterious Disasters, which won the National Outdoor Book Award. In 2012, Jeffery Babcock, one of the members of the MCA group that searched for the missing climbers, published Should I Not Return: The Most Controversial Tragedy in the History of North American Mountaineering!, detailing his group's expedition and his perspective on the disaster. In 2014, Andy Hall, the son of the park superintendent at the time of the accident, published his book Denali's Howl: The Deadliest Climbing Disaster on America's Wildest Peak, which includes interviews with both Wilcox and Snyder about the events.

== See also ==
- List of mountaineering disasters by death toll
- List of mountaineering disasters in North America by death toll
