= Harper Glacier =

Harper Glacier could mean:

- Harper Glacier (Alaska), a glacier of the Alaska Range on Denali
- Harper Glacier (Antarctica), a glacier of the Deep Freeze Range in Antarctica
- Harper Glacier (New Zealand), a glacier in the Liebig Range of the Southern Alps / Kā Tiritiri o te Moana, New Zealand
