= 2014 Liberty Ridge accident =

Major accident on Liberty Ridge, in Mount Rainier National Park, Washington

- Location: Mount Rainier National Park, Washington, US
- Cause: Fall
- Organised by: Alpine Ascents International
- Deaths: 6

On May 26, 2014, six members of a guided party were killed while climbing Liberty Ridge, a highly technical route on Mount Rainier. It was the worst accident on Mount Rainier since the 1981 avalanche and the worst mountaineering accident in the United States since 1986.

== Background ==
Liberty Ridge is one of the routes to climb Mount Rainier, a 14,410 ft active stratovolcano in the Pacific Northwest United States, located in Mount Rainier National Park. The route was first climbed in 1935, but was popularized by Fifty Classic Climbs of North America by Steve Roper and Allen Steck, and has beautiful views of two of Mount Rainier's faces, Willis and Liberty Walls. However, while about 10,000 to 11,000 people attempt to climb Mount Rainier annually, only about 100 of those attempt to climb via Liberty Ridge. Liberty Ridge takes three to five days, but unlike the normal route on the mountain, Liberty Ridge requires pitched ice climbing.

Liberty Ridge is considered to be the most dangerous and challenging of routes regularly climbed on Mount Rainier. It accounts for about 2% of climbers on the mountain, but 25% of its deaths. Wind can turn long parts of the route from snow to ice and the route is continuously shedding ice, snow, and rock, creating significant ice and rockfall hazards. Additionally, unlike most routes, climbers carry all their gear with them, rather than leaving at base camp, making the route more arduous. At a certain point along the route, it becomes much more difficult to turn around, requiring a higher level of commitment, which also makes the route more dangerous. At the time of the accident, Liberty Ridge was the hardest guided route to the summit and guiding companies stated they carefully vet their clients before attempting the route.

== Timeline ==
A group of six, including four clients and two guides, from Alpine Ascents International, started their climb on the White River Trail on Monday, May 26. The guides were highly experienced and the leader had climbed Rainier more than 50 times. The team reached Thumb Rock, 10,700 ft, by Tuesday. A team climbing Liberty Ridge at the same time later reported they saw the team leave Thumb Rock on Wednesday morning at 8 a.m and heard one of the teammate's voices that afternoon. The last contact by satellite phone was on 6:20PM on Wednesday, May 28 by one of the guides. He reported that all was well, but that a storm was starting to come. Two clients texted their friends, including a picture of their camp at the top of the Black Pyramid, and one of their tracking devices sent coordinates between 12,400 ft-12,800 ft, but nothing was reported as being amiss. There was no further contact from the team after that. At 4:00PM, a storm came, and it snowed several inches overnight on Wednesday and Thursday. On May 29, the other team climbing Liberty Ridge discovered some equipment at the base of the Black Pyramid and higher up, but did not see the guided party at the summit. The lack of contact on Thursday would not have been unusual for a summit team, according to the NPS spokesperson. However, on Friday May 30, when the team didn't return, Alpine Ascents called the police that the team was overdue.

The NPS search party on May 31 found no sign of survivors, but found six signals of avalanche beacons 3,000 ft below their last known location. Gear and tents were also visible in the debris. Three of the bodies were later recovered in August, and authorities believe the party fell more than 3,000 ft.

== Aftermath ==
The American Alpine Club reviewed the accident in their annual “Accidents in Mountaineering” report. The AAC concluded that the fall was likely caused by avalanche, icefall, or a collapsing ice ledge. As of July 2019, the guiding company Alpine Ascents no longer offers guided climbs of Liberty Ridge.

== See also ==
- List of mountaineering disasters in North America by death toll
- List of mountaineering disasters by death toll
- 1981 Mount Rainier avalanche
- Mount Rainier
