= Kelly James =

American mountain climber

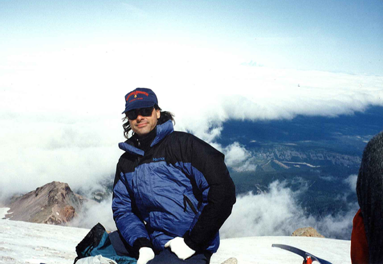
- Kelly James
- Died: December 11, 2006 (aged 48); Mount Hood, Oregon, U.S.

Jeffrey Kelly James (February 2, 1958 – c. December 11, 2006) was one of three experienced mountain climbers who died on Mount Hood in the U.S. state of Oregon in December 2006 in an incident that received worldwide attention.

== Life ==
James was a native of Dallas, Texas and a graduate of Texas Tech University in Lubbock. He was an accomplished landscape architect with his designs published in Metropolitan Home and Better Homes and Gardens. James was also a veteran mountaineer with more than 25 years experience climbing mountains including Mount McKinley, the Eiger, Alpamayo, and over 20 ascents of Mount Rainier. James resided in Dallas with his wife Karen James and four children. He was also a devoted Christian.

== Death ==
On December 10, 2006, during his climb on Mount Hood, James made a cell phone call to his wife, Karen, and two older sons telling them that he was trapped in a snow cave and that his two climbing partners Brian Hall and Jerry "Nikko" Cooke had gone for help. For more than a week, fierce weather thwarted rescue attempts. Finally on December 17, 2006, rescue workers located James’ body in a snow cave, 300 feet (91 m) below the summit. Before he died of hypothermia, James removed his glove and extended his ring finger with his signet JKJ ring prominently displayed, which some have interpreted as a signal to his family. The two other climbers who went for help, Brian Hall and Jerry Cooke, were never found, and have since been declared dead.

Kelly's wife Karen James wrote a book Holding Fast: The Untold Story of the Mount Hood Tragedy about the accident.

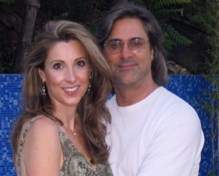
Kelly James with wife Karen

== See also ==
- Mount Hood climbing accidents: climbing incidents on Mount Hood, including a full description of this one
