= Velvet (dog) =

Velvet is a black lab-shepherd cattle mixed-breed dog, owned by Matty Bryant of Milwaukie, Oregon, who helped save three climbers, including Bryant, when they became stranded on Mount Hood, Oregon, on February 18, 2007.

The three climbers and Velvet toppled off a ledge while descending from a climb of Mount Hood. Due to low visibility, they stepped off a ledge at about 8,300 feet (2,500 m) elevation during a storm, separating them from five other members of the party. The five reported the accident and were themselves soon rescued. The three fallen climbers activated Mountain Locator Units to let searchers find their position, which was at about 7,400 feet (2,300 m) elevation in White River Canyon. Due to worsening conditions, they were forced to spend the night on the mountain while 70-mile-per-hour (110 km/h) winds blew with temperatures in the 20s (−1 to −7 C). Velvet spent the night going from person to person to ensure they kept warm as they huddled under two sleeping bags and a tarp. The climbers were rescued the next morning.

Velvet was treated at a non-profit Portland veterinary clinic for broken toenails and a cut on one paw. A fund now exists at DoveLewis Emergency Animal Hospital in Velvet's name to assist low-income families with emergency veterinary care.

== See also ==
- List of individual dogs
