= Castle Peak (California) =

Mountain in California's Sierra Nevada

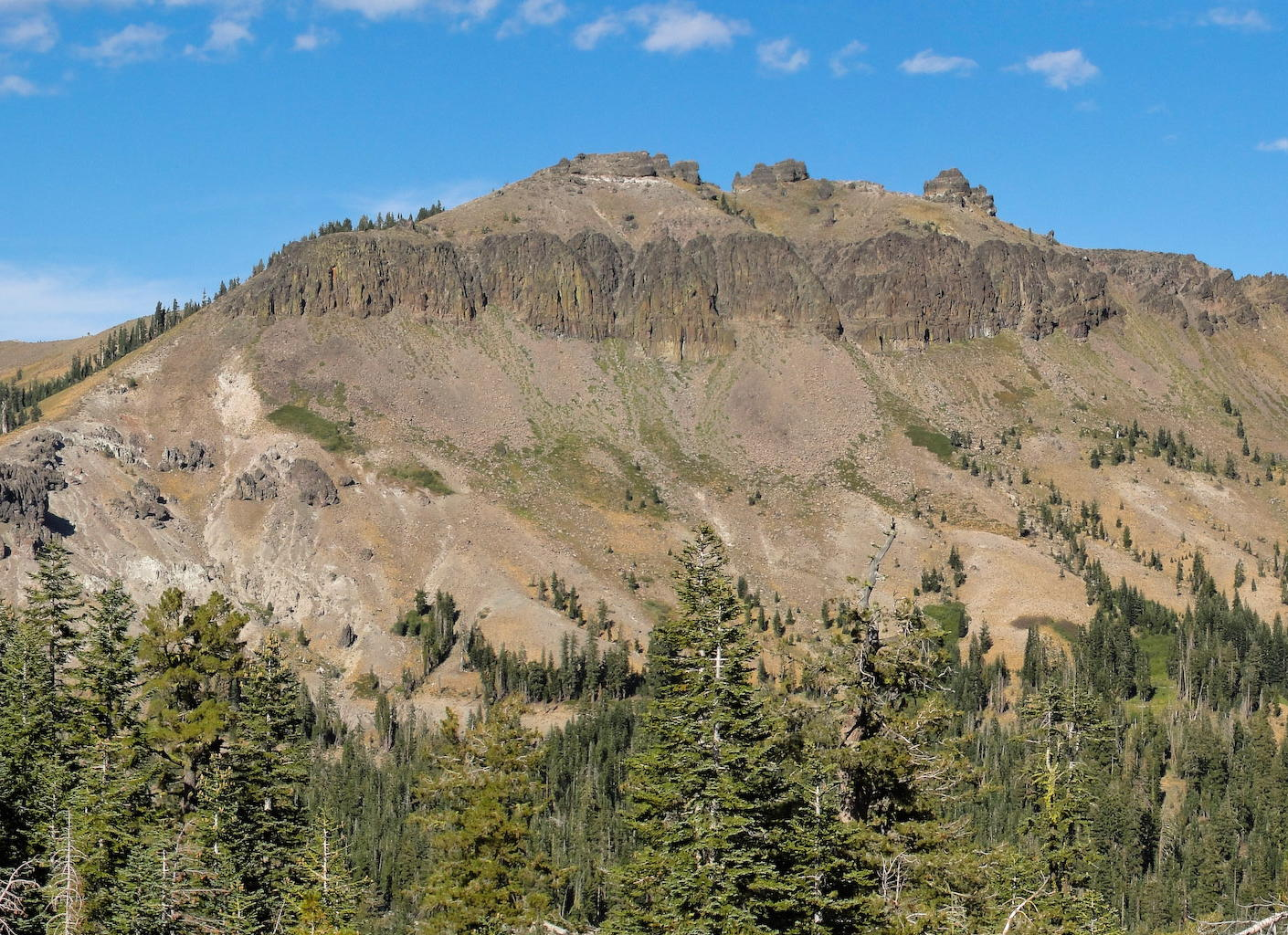
- Castle Peak from Andesite Peak

Highest point
- Elevation: 9,109 ft (2,776 m) NAVD 88
- Prominence: 1,343 ft (409 m)
- Listing: Sierra Peaks Section
- Coordinates: 39°21′56″N 120°20′57″W

Geography
- Location within California Location within the United States
- Location: Nevada County, California, U.S.
- Parent range: Sierra Nevada
- Topo map: USGS Norden

Climbing
- Easiest route: Exposed scramble (class 3)

Castle Peak is a mountain in California's Sierra Nevada near I-80, Donner Pass, and the Nevada border. It is in the Tahoe National Forest not far off the Pacific Crest Trail, and adjacent to Castle Pass. It was originally named Mount Stanford, after Leland Stanford, by the Whitney Survey of 1860–1874. The peak takes its name from its conical shape.

On February 17, 2026, Castle Peak was the site of a deadly avalanche in which nine skiers were killed.

== Climate ==
According to the Köppen climate classification system, Castle Peak is located in an alpine climate zone. Most weather fronts originate in the Pacific Ocean and travel east toward the Sierra Nevada mountains. As fronts approach, they are forced upward by the peaks (orographic lift), causing them to drop their moisture in the form of rain or snowfall onto the range. Donner Pass averages 51.6 inches (1,310 mm) of precipitation per year, and with an average of 411.5 inches (10.45 m) of snow per year, it is one of the snowiest places in the contiguous United States.

== Gallery ==
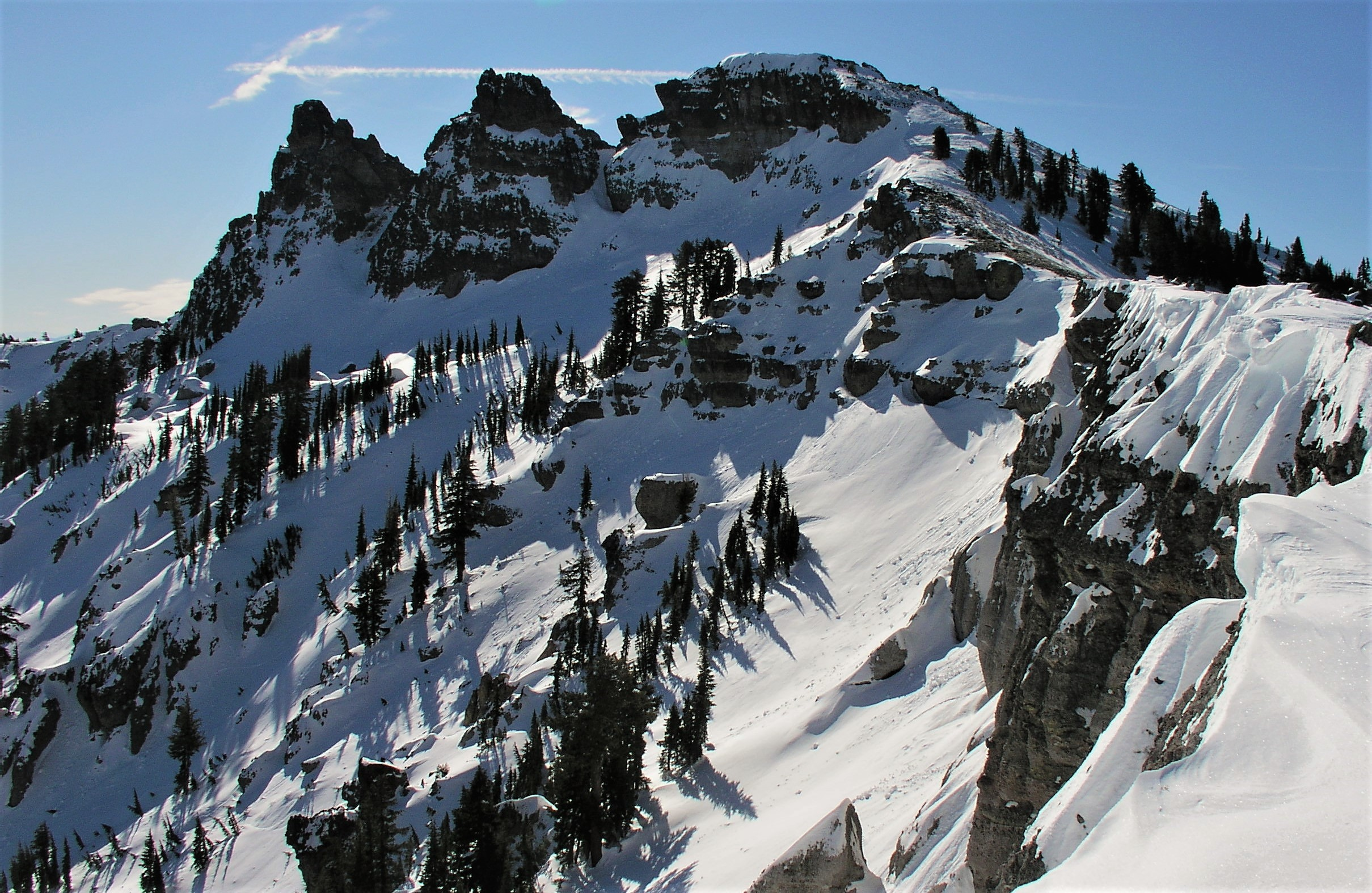
Castle Peak from the south ridge. The highest summit is on the left.

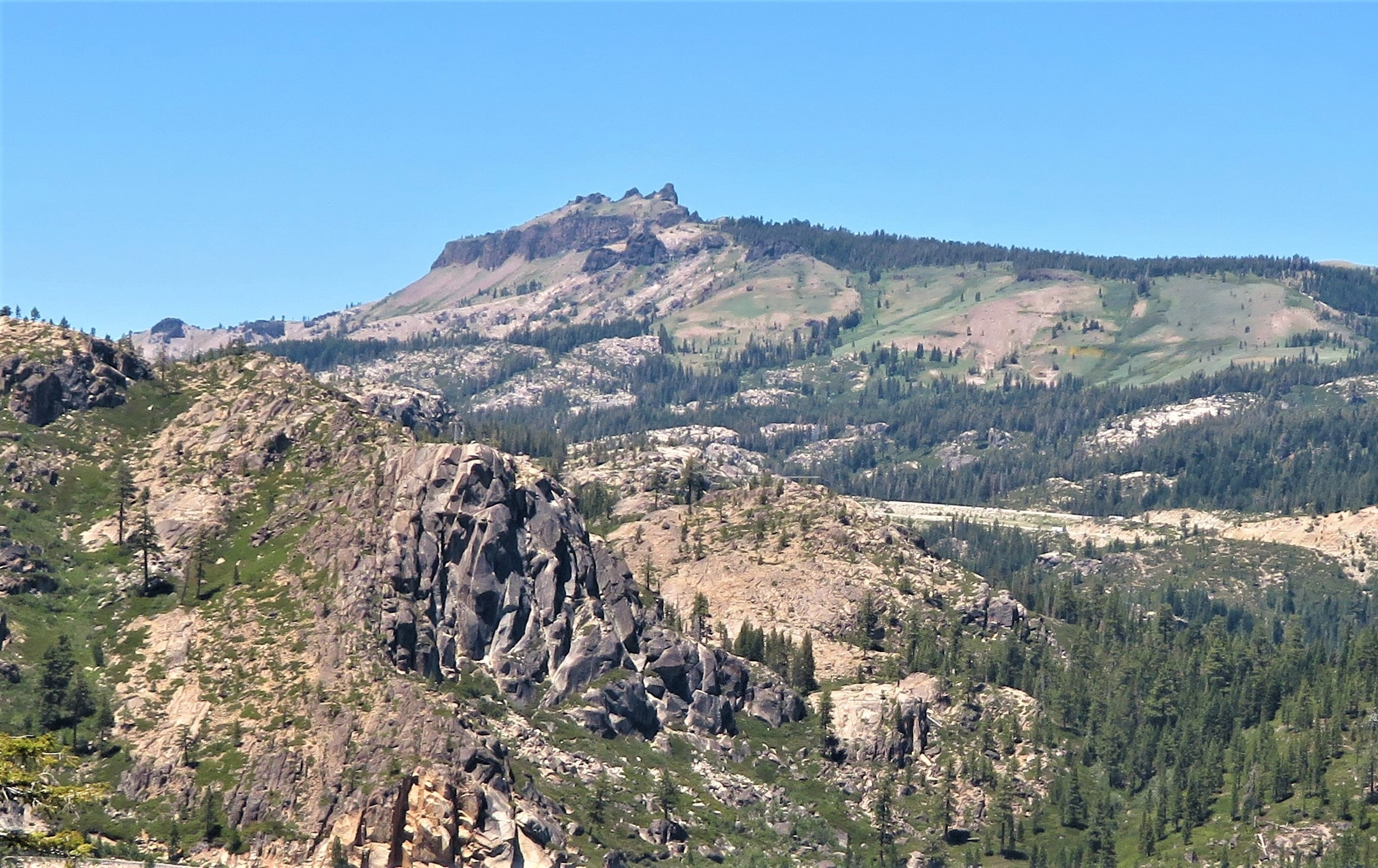
South-southeast aspect

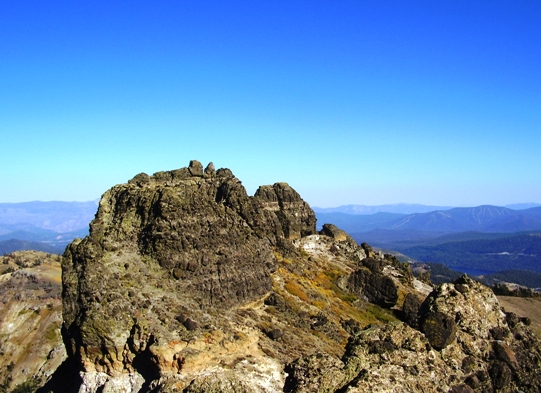
View of Castle Peak's summit, from terminus of the Castle Peak Summit Trail.

== See also ==
- Sierra Nevada subalpine zone — habitat and forest surrounding peak
