= Mountain Locator Unit =

A Mountain Locator Unit (MLU) was a radio transmitter for use by mountain climbers as an emergency locator beacon when the wearer needs rescue.

The MLUs were simple radio beacons, and thus required search and rescuers to use traditional radio direction finding (RDF or DF) equipment to obtain a bearing, but not a precise location, to the beacon.

Unique to Mount Hood, these devices could be rented for $5 at Portland-area outdoor shops and the Inn, open 24 hours a day. The units were available from the late 1980s until 2017, but advances in technology now provide superior locating information by devices such as a PLB, InReach or Spot.

Groups scaling Mount Hood are recommended to carry an emergency signaling device and all climbers must register before climbing and sign out upon return.

The MLU was designed after a school group with two adults and seven children perished on Mount Hood in 1986. (See Mount Hood climbing accidents.) The bodies of some of the group were found in a snow cave a day after the searchers had passed within fifteen feet of their shelter without noticing them.

According to Steve Rollins of Portland Mountain Rescue, the units could be worn on a sash across the chest and were relatively light. Renting MLU's was less expensive than either purchasing or renting a personal locator beacon, which typically cost several hundred dollars to buy, or rent from various sources for around $50 per week.

The Mount Hood MLU system was controlled and maintained by the U.S. Forest Service and Clackamas County Sheriff. Transmitters broadcast at 168.54 MHz and provided good signals even when buried in snow. They could be received at up to 20 miles (32 km), though the signal travels in line of sight, so they could not be received from behind a ridge or deep in a canyon. The technology is very similar to wildlife tracking systems.

A Mountain Locator Unit only transmitted a signal and did not initiate a rescue (when you activated an MLU beacon, there was no one monitoring for signals, the device only assisted rescuers in locating lost climbers once a rescue has been requested by other means and rescuers know to listen and search for the beacon's signal. They were also not designed to be used for avalanche safety (avalanche beacons are entirely different than what MLU's were designed for.)

The use of MLU Beacon technology was overtaken by availability of Personal Locator Beacons (PLBs) and other technologies such as "SPOT Satellite GPS Messengers". These newer technologies not only allow rescuers to determine your location, but they also have the ability to initiate a rescue by alerting authorities that you are in need of help.

In fact, most modern cell phones have built in GPS receivers. If a climber calls 911, the cell phone may automatically provide emergency services with the climber's GPS coordinates. Cell phones also allow the lost or injured climber to provide important information to rescuers, such as the nature of any injuries; however, cell phone coverage on Mount Hood can be spotty and they are therefore not necessarily a replacement for other technologies such as PLBs which leverage satellites overhead for communication.

Oregon State Representative John Lim (R) introduced House Bill 2509, which would require climbers to use an electronic signaling device when climbing above 10,000 feet between November and March. The Oregon House of Representatives passed an amended version of the bill 33 to 22 on March 28, 2007 after a lengthy floor debate and passed it onto the Oregon State Senate where it died in committee. The bill was widely opposed by mountain rescue organizations for fear that it would cause inexperienced climbers to rely on rescuers to save them rather than learning to become self-reliant.

== See also ==
- Mountain rescue
