= 2026 Lake Tahoe avalanche =

Major avalanche near Lake Tahoe, California

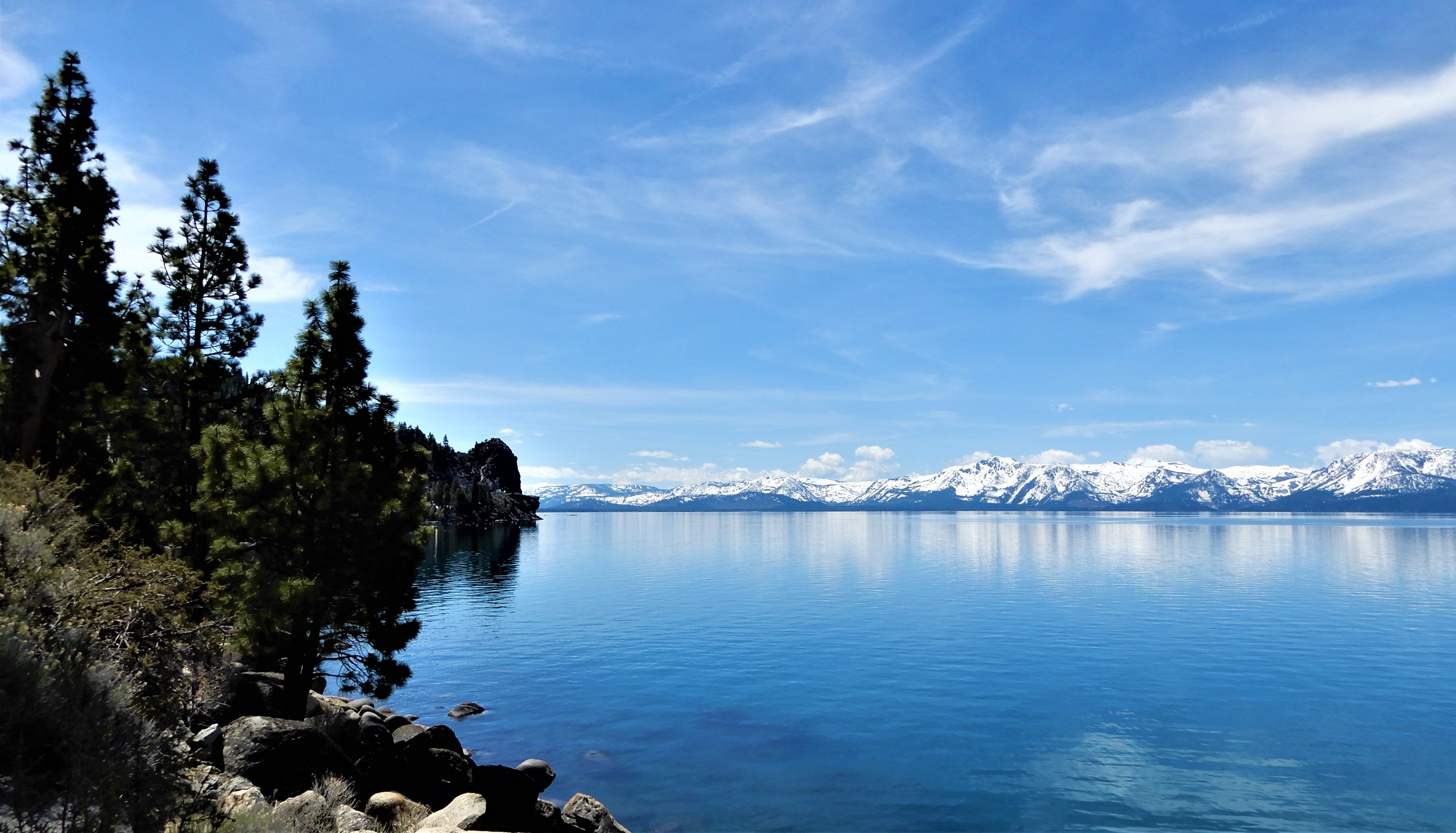
- Lake Tahoe in May 2019
- Date: February 17, 2026
- Location: Lake Tahoe area, California, US; 39°21′56″N 120°20′57″W
- Type: Avalanche
- Deaths: 9
- Injuries: 6

On February 17, 2026, an avalanche struck north of Lake Tahoe in California, United States, around Frog Lake and Castle Peak. The avalanche occurred amid a heavy, multi-day snowstorm in the area. Nine people were killed. All of the deceased were members of a ski group who had been on a guided backcountry excursion at the time of the avalanche. The avalanche was the deadliest in the United States since the 1981 Mount Rainier avalanche.

== Background ==
Snow began in California on the night of Sunday, February 15, with forecasters calling for 4–8 feet (1.2–2.4 m) of snow potentially falling along the Sierra Crest, including Donner Pass with the heaviest snow projected for February 16 through the 17th in the Sierra. By February 17, snow accumulation reached 3–6 feet (0.91–1.83 m) in the Sierra Nevada region, where Lake Tahoe is located. The Boreal Mountain Ski Resort near Castle Peak, reported 30 inches (76 cm) of snow over a 24-hour period, the National Weather Service said 3–4 inches (7.6–10.2 cm) of snow was falling per hour in some areas of the Sierras near the avalanche. An avalanche warning was issued for the Lake Tahoe region early on the 17th, which remained in effect until February 19, the warning also said avalanches up to D3 in size were likely, or avalanches large enough to bury a car or house.

The area where the avalanche occurred is on US National Forest Land. The group was on a three-day trip offered by Blackbird Mountain Guides for about $1,165, with some safety gear supplied, but the company does not provide avalanche gear. It instead recommends that clients bring avalanche beacons, shovels and probes.

The skiing group left for Frog Lake on February 15. The group consisted of 11 skiers and four tour guides, and multiple were associated with the Sugar Bowl Academy, a private school and US Ski and Snowboard club for ages 5 to 23. The trip was meant to last three days and return on February 17. The group was scheduled to trek to Frog Lake, an alpine lake a few miles northeast of the site of the Donner Party disaster, then stay in the Frog Lake huts for two nights while backcountry skiing before returning.

== Avalanche ==
The avalanche occurred on the north side of Perry Peak at around 11:30 am on February 17th. Nevada County Sheriff Shannan Moon said that a football field-sized slab of snow slid off the mountain and one of the hikers shouted "avalanche" with the snow overtaking the group quickly. The group was heading back towards the trailhead and was caught quickly by the snow. Calls for rescue after the avalanche were received by first responders at around 11:30 a.m. local time. Shortly after noon, the Nevada County authorities announced a search and rescue operation in the area.

Rescuers reached the skiers around 5:30 p.m. and found six survivors. The survivors were found huddled in a makeshift shelter constructed out of tarpaulin sheets, and communicated with rescuers with emergency beacons and iPhone emergency mode. Of the survivors many were found with various injuries and two were taken to the hospital for treatment. Five of the survivors were clients while one was identified as a guide, with ages ranging from 30 to 55 years old with four men and two women.

The survivors attempted to find and recover the missing party members prior to first responders locating them, with three of the victims found by the survivors prior to being rescued. Nevada County Undersherriff Sam Brown said it was thought that after the avalanche, the survivors went into "frantic mode" in their attempts to unbury their friends and partners, and were ultimately unsuccessful in freeing three others.

== Victims ==
Nine people were killed in the avalanche. Three of the four guides were killed in the avalanche. Seven women and two men were presumed to be deceased. Two of the six survivors were injured and unable to move, and taken to the hospital.

Six of the deceased were described as mothers, wives and passionate skilled skiers. Another was identified as the spouse of a Tahoe Nordic Search and Rescue team member.

== Investigation ==
Authorities were investigating the tour group's decision to embark on the excursion despite the large risk of heavy snow and avalanches.

== Reactions ==
The tour group that organized the excursion, Blackbird Mountain Guides, said they were assisting the authorities with rescue efforts.

The executive director of the Sugar Bowl Academy said the school was not sharing the names of any victims or survivors out of respect of the families, and that there was overwhelming support seen in the community.

California Governor Gavin Newsom expressed his condolences and that he and his wife, Jennifer Siebel Newsom had connections with some of the victims, stating that they had mutual friends with some and that his wife's old family friends were impacted.

== See also ==
- List of mountaineering disasters by death toll
