= Huntington Ravine =

Cirque in New Hampshire, United States

Highest point
- Elevation: 3,392 ft (1,034 m)
- Coordinates: 44°16′20″N 71°17′00″W

Geography
- Location: New Hampshire, United States of America
- Parent range: White Mountains

Huntington Ravine is a glacial cirque on Mount Washington in the White Mountains of New Hampshire. It is named for Joshua H. Huntington, the Principal Assistant to State Geologist Charles H. Hitchcock (1836–1919) for the Geological Survey of New Hampshire.

Of the four major cirques on Mount Washington (Tuckerman and Huntington ravines, Oakes Gulf, and the Great Gulf), it has the steepest and highest headwall. Only one hiking trail ascends Huntington Ravine toward Mount Washington's summit; that trail, the Huntington Ravine Trail, crosses a boulder field, ascends a talus fan, and winds steeply up the center of the cirque's headwall, requiring several tricky scrambling moves that may be intimidating for less-experienced (or more acrophobic) hikers.

All other portions of the headwall are too steep to climb safely without climbing gear and technical expertise. Multiple technical rock-climbing routes ascend the ravine, and ice climbing is a popular winter activity (see below). Because the ravine is higher and more exposed to the elements than most other climbing areas in the eastern United States, rock and ice climbing — and even hiking — are risky and weather-dependent. Avalanches, icefalls, and hypothermia have killed climbers in Huntington repeatedly in recent years, and the hiking path is usually not passable until late May or early June.

== Climbing routes ==
The Northeast Ridge of the Pinnacle (also known as Pinnacle Buttress) is the best-known rock climb in Huntington Ravine. First climbed in its present form in 1928, the seven-pitch route follows a blocky buttress on the southern side. With a moderate difficulty rating of 5.7, the climb is a popular objective of climbers seeking a long route in an alpine setting. The northern side of the ravine features Henderson Ridge, another long (but easier) route.

Winter climbing activity focuses on ice climbing ascents of the eight gullies that angle across the ravine. From south to north, the gullies are South Gully, Odell's Gully, Pinnacle Gully, Central Gully, Diagonal Gully, Yale Gully, Damnation Gully, and North Gully. Of these, Pinnacle Gully, tucked underneath the Pinnacle Buttress rock climb, is the best-known. All ice climbs in Huntington Ravine are subject to avalanche risk; climbers should consult the avalanche reports published by the Mount Washington Avalanche Center before attempting any of these routes.

== See also ==
- Presidential Range
- White Mountain National Forest
