= Eliot Glacier =

Glacier on Mount Hood, Oregon, United States

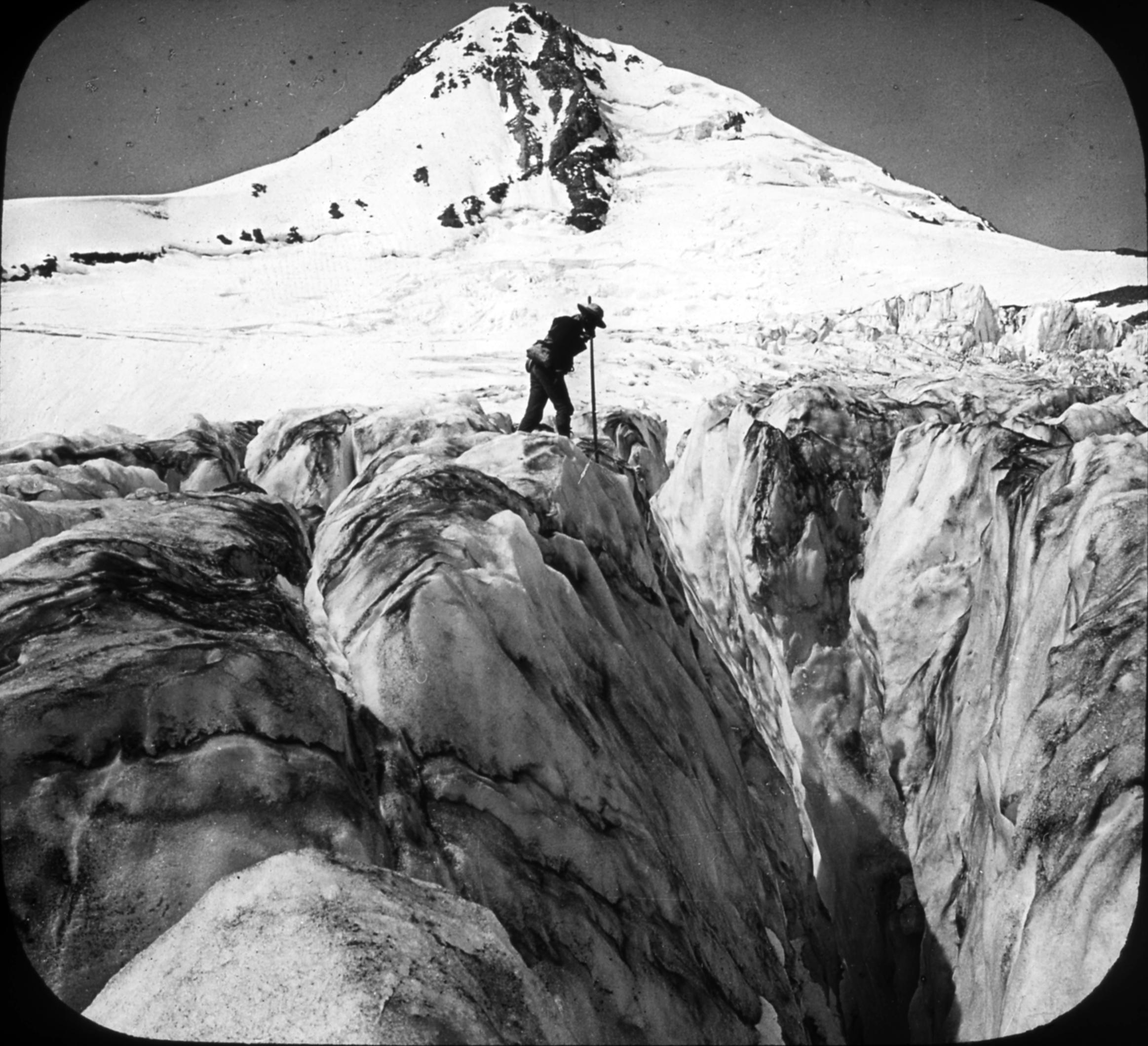
- An early 20th century image

- Location within Oregon
- Type: Mountain glacier
- Location: Hood River County, Oregon, United States
- Coordinates: 45°22′52″N 121°40′49″W
- Area: 405 acres (164 ha)
- Length: 1.5 mi (2.4 km)
- Terminus: Talus
- Status: Retreating

Eliot Glacier is a glacier on the northeastern slopes of Mount Hood in the U.S. state of Oregon. Researchers have reported that Eliot Glacier covered an area of 395 acres (160 ha) in 2004 but had retreated 680 meters (2,230 ft) since 1901, though that decline was less than all but one other glacier on Mount Hood. The glacier's situation on a northeast slope, its higher altitude accumulation zone close to the summit of Mount Hood and its high level of talus debris may explain its slower retreat.

== See also ==
- List of glaciers in the United States
