= Harper Glacier (Alaska) =

Glacier in Alaska, United States

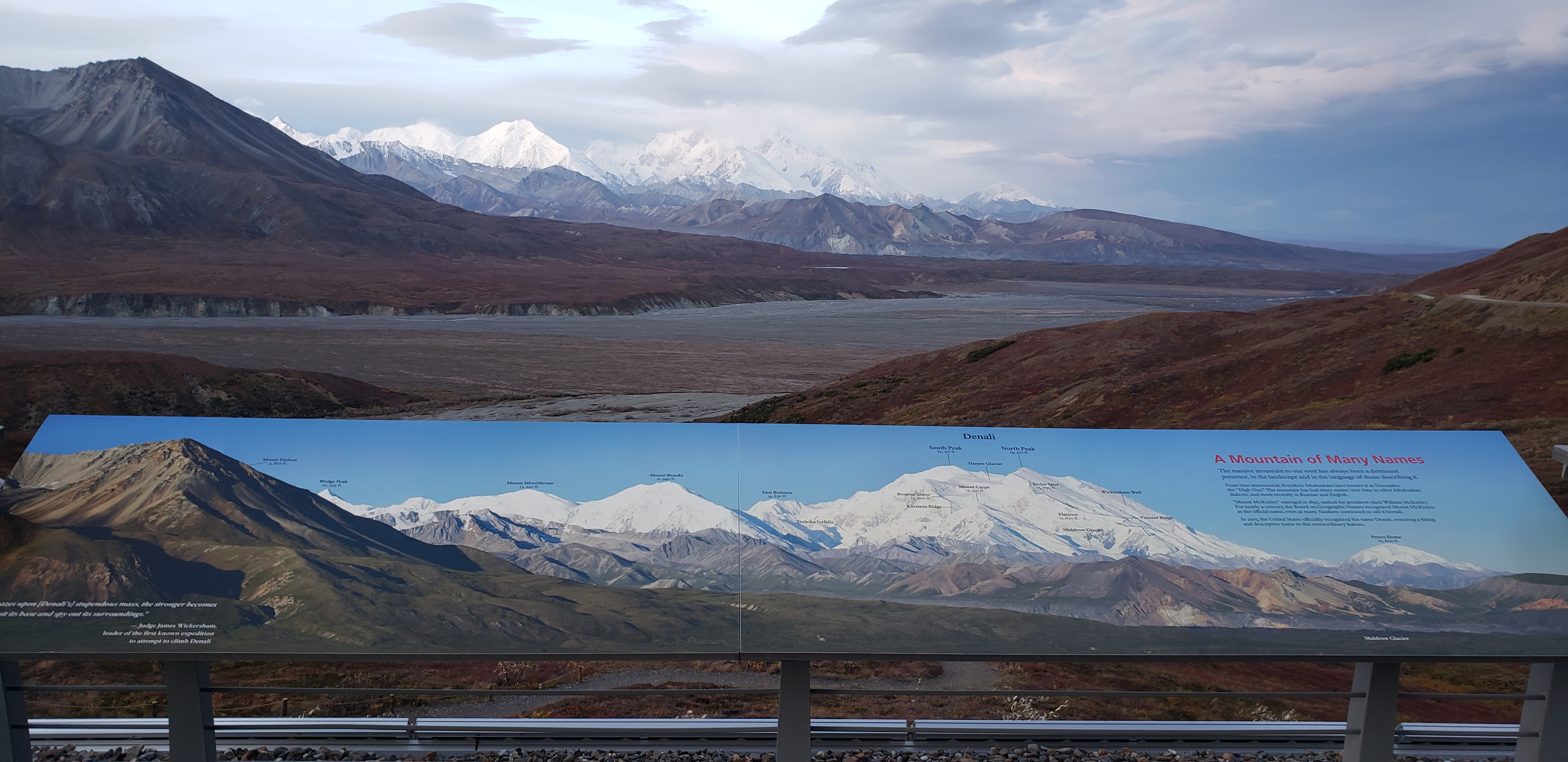

- Location within Alaska
- Interactive map of Harper Glacier
- Type: Valley glacier
- Location: Denali Borough, Alaska, U.S.
- Coordinates: 63°05′22″N 150°58′37″W

Harper Glacier is a glacier in Denali National Park and Preserve in the U.S. state of Alaska. The glacier originates on Denali at more than 19,000 feet (5,800 m) between Denali's North Peak and South Peak, falling to the northeast between the Karsten Ridge and the Taylor Spur. From about 12,000 feet (3,700 m) it falls between Pioneer Ridge and Karpe Ridge in the Great Icefall down to the Lower Icefall to become Muldrow Glacier. In 1913, the glacier was named by Hudson Stuck after Walter Harper, a Koyukon mountaineer and the first man to reach the summit of Denali.

== See also ==
- List of glaciers
