= 1981 Mount Rainier avalanche =

Major avalanche in Mount Rainier National Park, Washington

- Date: June 21, 1981
- Location: Mount Rainier National Park, Washington, US; 46.8385°N 121.7119°W
- Type: Avalanche
- Deaths: 11
- Injuries: 12

On June 21, 1981, an avalanche near Ingraham Glacier, in Mount Rainier, struck a climb party attempting to reach the summit of Mount Rainier. Out of the 29 members, 11 were killed, making it the deadliest avalanche in the history of the mountain.

== Background ==
The expedition was organized by Rainier Mountaineering, Inc., a company that took climbers up to the summit with a commonly-used route for $150 (1981 USD).

Prior to the incident, three of the climbers returned to Camp Muir with a guide, while three more guides left to scout snow conditions and avalanche danger.

== Incident ==
At 5:45 am, the glacier's icefall fractured. The three remaining guides, who were atop Disappointment Cleaver at the time, heard the fracture and saw the wall of ice shatter to pieces after colliding with the mountainside. This caused an avalanche of ice and snow to form.

Hearing the avalanche, the climbers went together in groups of five and attempted to flee. But eleven were not able to escape and were killed. The dead included ten climbers and a guide. The other climbers who were not in the path of the avalanche escaped unscathed and did not receive any injuries.

== Aftermath ==
Following the avalanche, a 19-member search party was organized, although severe snowfall and gale-force winds prevented them from finding the bodies.

== See also ==
- 2026 Lake Tahoe avalanche
