= Portland Mountain Rescue =

Portland Mountain Rescue is a search and rescue organization based in Portland, Oregon, United States. It specializes in high angle mountain rescue and mountain rescue in northwest Oregon and southwest Washington, as well as providing educational materials and information on mountain and backcountry safety. Secondary areas of operations include Central Oregon and western Washington. The organization is 100% volunteer and has about 65 field-deployable members.

Portland Mountain Rescue is called upon by sheriff departments when there is a reported missing climber, hiker, or other rescue mission requiring the unit's specialized skills. Law enforcement does not climb the mountain, but relies on mountain rescue organizations for their skill, expertise, and experience. Since its inception, Portland Mountain Rescue has been involved in most rescues on Mount Hood.

The organization's members have diverse backgrounds and professions. Their common attribute is that all are highly skilled climbers. Each member spends a minimum of 30 hours training each year in necessary skills: navigation, alpine climbing, rope work, wilderness survival, patient care, and others.

Portland Mountain Rescue volunteers object to media reports suggesting the members "risk their own lives" as it is hard on their families and inaccurate. The organization has several procedures and requirements which insure its own member safety, such as working in teams of at least two on high, steep terrain.

== History ==
In 1955, the groups which had been doing rescues formed MORESCO, an acronym for Mountain Rescue Council of Oregon. In 1959, MORESCO joined several other organizations from the western US and formed the Mountain Rescue Association at Timberline Lodge. By the mid-1970s, MORESCO was experiencing difficulties related to its wide geographic area; it began reorganizing into regional teams. In 1977, the Portland unit of MORESCO formed Portland Mountain Rescue.
