= List of mountaineering disasters in Europe by death toll =

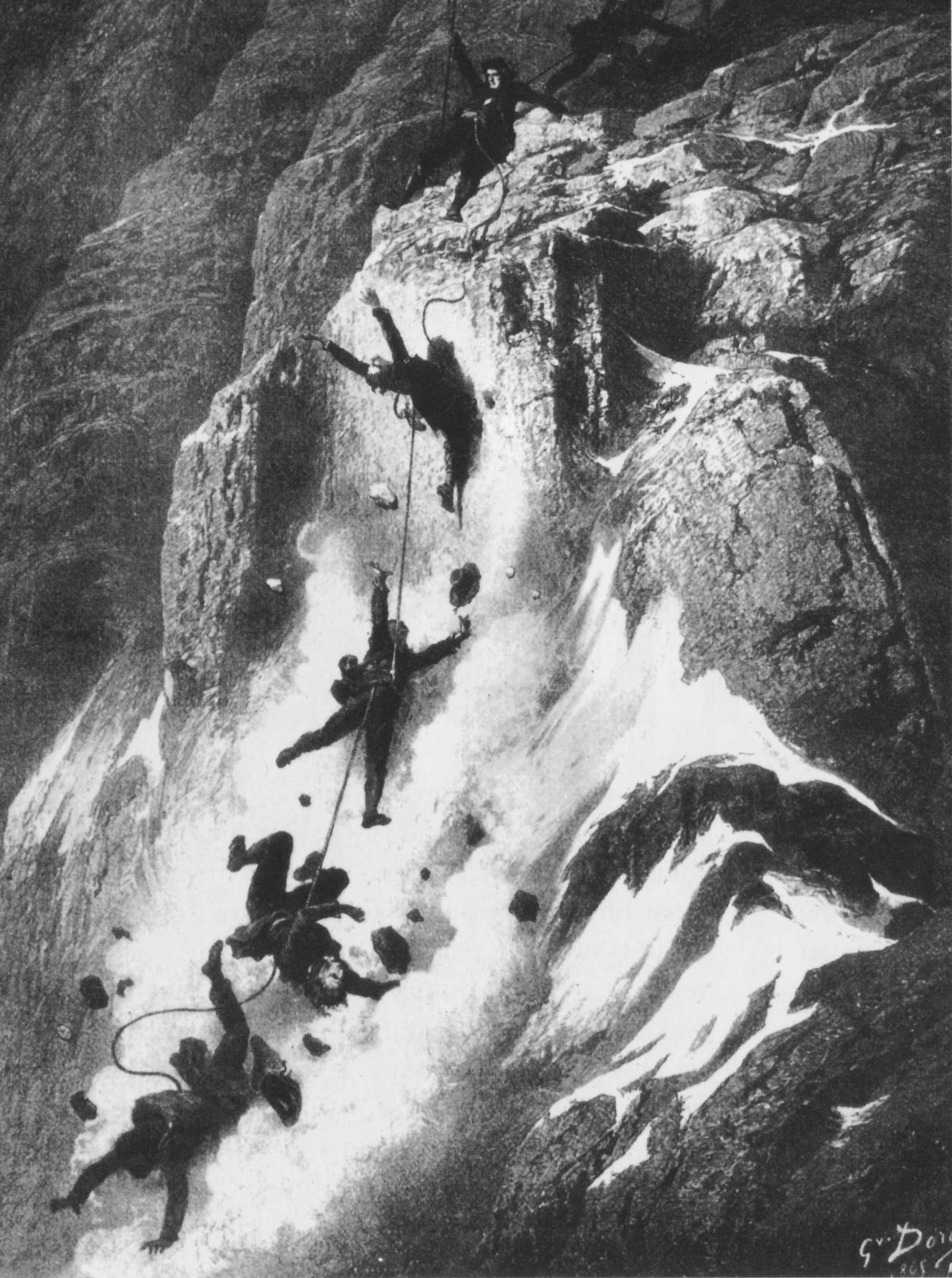
During the first ascent of the Matterhorn in 1865, four mountaineers were killed in an accident, marking one of the first major mountaineering disasters in Europe.

The following is a list of mountaineering disasters in Europe by death toll. This list includes climbing and mountaineering disasters that resulted in multiple deaths (3+) in Europe.

Fatalities	Year	Type	Mountain	Location	Details
19	1968	Avalanche	Biały Jar, Giant Mountains	Poland	A large avalanche swept away 24 people at the bottom of Biały Jar, killing 19 of them.
13	1954	Storm	Hoher Dachstein, Dachstein Mountains	Upper Austria, Austria	A harsh blizzard killed a ten students and three teachers who were hiking to Hoher Dachstein.
11	2022	Serac collapse	Marmolada, Dolomites	Trentino-Alto Adige, Italy	A large serac collapsed onto five rope teams ascending the peak, killing eleven and injuring eight more.
11	1998	Avalanche	Crête du Lauzet, Cottian Alps	Hautes-Alpes, France	Nine students and two guides were killed when the weight of their group of 38 triggered an avalanche.
9	2012	Avalanche	Mont Maudit, Graian Alps	Haute-Savoie, France	Nine climbers were killed and nine more were injured in an avalanche during an attempted dawn ascent of Mont Maudit.
9	1959	Disputed	Kholat Syakhl, Ural Mountains	Sverdlovsk Oblast, Russia	Nine mountaineers from died in mysterious and heavily contested circumstances.
9	1994	Avalanche	Mont Blanc, Graian Alps	Haute-Savoie, France	Nine climbers die in an avalanche.
8	2008	Serac collapse	Mont Blanc du Tacul, Graian Alps	Haute-Savoie, France	A deadly avalanche killed eight climbers (5 Austrians, 3 Swiss) heading for the summit of Mont Blanc.
8	2003	Avalanche	Rysy, Tatra Mountains	Poland	An avalanche struck a group of 13 high school students attempting to summit Rysy, killing nine of them.
8	1993	Avalanche	Grandes Jorasses, Graian Alps	Aosta Valley, Italy	Eight climbers from Italy, Germany, and France were killed in an avalanche above Courmayeur.
7	2010	Avalanches	Diemtig Valley, Bernese Alps	Switzerland	Eight skiers heading towards the peak of Drümännler were struck by an avalanche. When other mountaineers came to help, a second avalanche was triggered burying 11 more people. In total, seven died.
7	2018	Storm	Pigne d'Arolla, Pennine Alps	Switzerland	A group of 14 ski-mountaineers were stranded in white-out conditions while descending Pigne d'Arolla. Seven died of hypothermia.
7	2015	Avalanche	Dôme de Neige des Écrins, Dauphiné Alps	Hautes-Alpes, France	Three roped groups of climbers were struck by a large avalanche, with only one person surviving.
6	2016	Avalanche	Pas du Roc, Massif des Cerces	Savoie, France	A group of French Foreign Legionnaires participating in a ski-mountaineering exercise were struck by an avalanche near Valfréjus, killing 6.
6	2009	Avalanche	Schalfkogel, Ötztal Alps	Tirol, Austria	An avalanche killed six hikers (five Czech, one Slovak) attempting to summit Schalfkogel near Sölden.
6	2007	Avalanche	Jungfrau, Bernese Alps	Switzerland	Six Swiss Soldiers were killed in an avalanche during an alpine training exercise.
6	2024	Storm	Tête Blanche, Pennine Alps	Switzerland	Six skiers died of hypothermia after becoming stranded in a storm.
6	2016	Avalanche	Schneebiger Nock, High Tauern	South Tyrol, Italy	Six skiers were killed on Monte Nevoso.
6	2015	Avalanche	Vallon de Bachas, Queyras	Hautes-Alpes, France	Six experienced climbers were killed in an avalanche.
6	1971	Storm	Cairngorm Plateau	Scotland, United Kingdom	Five students and one teacher died of exposure during a two-day expedition by members of Ainslie Park High School in the Cairngorms.
5	2025	Avalanche	Vertainspitze, Ortler Alps	South Tyrol, Italy	Five climbers were killed and two were injured by an avalanche while attempting an ascent.
5	2000	Avalanche	Tour Ronde, Graian Alps	Haute-Savoie, France	Five mountaineers (3 German, 2 French) died in an avalanche on Tour Ronde while attempting to summit Mont Blanc.
5	2016	Avalanche	Geier, Tux Alps	Tirol, Austria	Two ski groups from the Czech Republic were struck by a large avalanche, which killed 5.
5	2025	Avalanche	Rimpfischhorn, Pennine Alps	Switzerland	Five climbers were found deceased following an avalanche.
5	1936	Storm	Schauinsland, Black Forest	Baden-Württemberg, Germany	Five English schoolboys died of exhaustion during a poorly planned expedition to climb Schauinsland in a snowstorm.
5	2020	Avalanche	Dachstein	Austria	Five snowshoers were killed by an avalanche.
5	2011	Avalanche	Haute Route	Switzerland	Five were killed when an avalanche hit a group of eleven skiers.
4	1936	Avalanche	Eiger, Bernese Alps	Switzerland	Four climbers died attempting to summit Eiger's north face.
4	1998	Avalanche	Aonach Mòr	Scotland, United Kingdom	Four climbers were killed and three were injured in an avalanche on the Aonach an Nid basin of Aonach Mòr.
4	1865	Fall	Matterhorn, Pennine Alps	Switzerland	During the descent after successfully completing the first ascent of the Matterhorn, novice mountaineer Douglas Hadow slipped, and pulled three others connect by rope to him down the north face.
3	1995	Avalanche	Buachaille Etive Mòr	Scotland, United Kingdom	A father, son, and family friend were killed during their descent when a climber above them triggered an avalanche.
3	1970	Avalanche	Ben Nevis	Scotland, United Kingdom	An avalanche struck four climbers on Ben Nevis, killing three.
3	2023	Fall	Aonach Eagach	Scotland, United Kingdom	Three roped climbers killed in a fall.
3	2025	Avalanche	Tosc, Julian Alps	Slovenia	Three Croatian climbers died in an avalanche.
3	2009	Avalanche	Buachaille Etive Mòr	Scotland, United Kingdom	Three mountaineers were killed in a deadly avalanche.
3	1980	Storm	Pilsko, Żywiec Beskids	Poland	A group of schoolchildren got lost in a snowstorm, resulting in three deaths.

== See also ==
- List of mountaineering disasters by death toll
- List of mountaineering disasters in North America by death toll
