= List of mountaineering disasters by death toll =

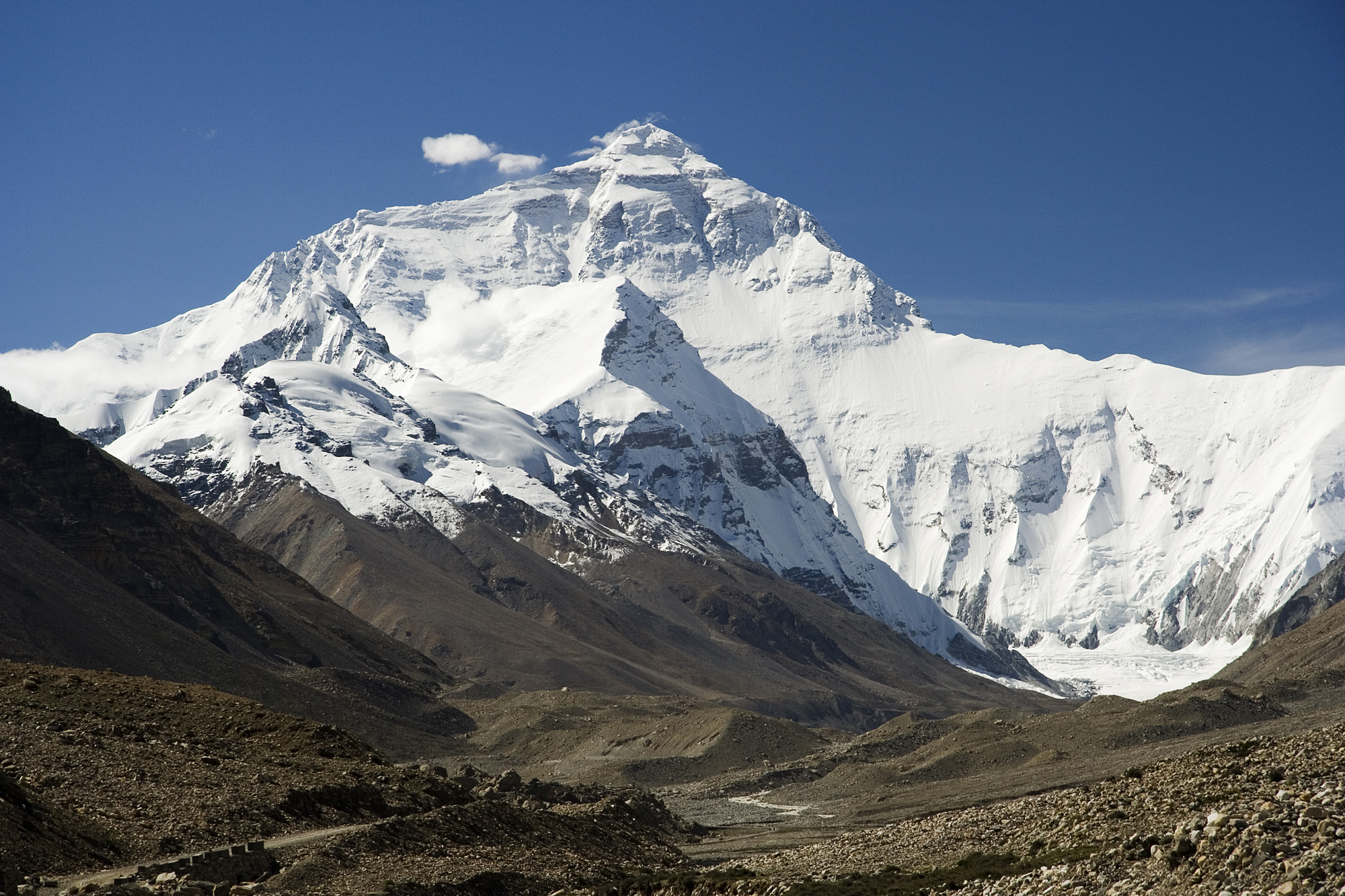
North Face of Everest; over 300 people have died on the mountain.

The following is a list of mountaineering disasters by death toll and includes climbing and mountaineering disasters that resulted in deaths during the event of at least 4 people.

== List ==
Fatalities	Year	Type	Location	Country	Details
199	1902	Storm	Hakkōda Mountains	Japan	Hakkōda Mountains disaster. Soldiers ordered to the traverse Hakkōda Mountains as a training exercise. Soldiers were given inadequate equipment and training. 95% of the soldiers perished due to hypothermia.
45	2005	Storm	Antuco Volcano	Chile	Tragedy of Antuco. Chilean army major sent group of conscripts to march in blizzard in -35 °C (-30 °F), despite objections from corporals. Only one out of the five companies had mountain survival gear.
43	1990	Earthquake and Avalanche	Lenin Peak	USSR	Lenin Peak disaster. 6.4 magnitude earthquake triggered serac fall on Lenin Peak. This resulted in an avalanche crashing into Camp II, where 45 climbers were camping. This is considered to be the worst mountaineering accident in history, where the victims were mountaineers rather than soldiers.
43	2014	Storm	Annapurna and Dhaulagiri	Nepal,China	2014 Nepal snowstorm disaster. A snowstorm and a series of avalanches killed trekkers and climbers, including those on Annapurna Circuit and at base camps.
27	2022	Avalanche	Draupadi Ka Danda (DKD2)	India	2022 Uttarakhand avalanche. Avalanche during guided mountaineering course buried mountaineers in crevasse.
24	2015	Earthquake and Avalanche	Mount Everest	Nepal,China	2015 Mount Everest avalanches. A 7.8 magnitude earthquake caused an avalanche to sweep into Everest Base Camp.
24	1972	Avalanche	Mount Fuji	Japan	1972 Fuji accident. On a popular March weekend for climbing, a low pressure system struck, causing rain to seep into climbers' sleeping bags and tents, followed by high winds that caused temperatures of -40 C with windchill. Many died of hypothermia, and six, whose bodies were not found, were believed to have been buried in an avalanche.
19	1968	Avalanche	Biały Jar	Poland	1968 Biały Jar avalanche. Avalanche swept 25 hikers.
17	2017	Avalanche	Otgontenger Peak	Mongolia	2017 Otgontenger avalanche. While the mountaineers were descending, a large avalanche swept 17 of the 27 members of the party. The cause of death was determined to be trauma sustained in the fall.
17	1991	Avalanche	Kawagarbo	China	Kawagarbo avalanche. A nighttime avalanche killed all seventeen members of a joint Japanese and Chinese expedition to climb the previously unclimbed peak.
16	2014	Avalanche	Mount Everest	Nepal,China	2014 Mount Everest ice avalanche. Seracs on Khumbu Icefall failed, resulting in ice avalanche that killed sixteen climbing sherpas.
16	1937	Avalanche	Nanga Parbat	Pakistan	1937 Nanga Parbat avalanche. Team was at Camp IV below Rakhiot Peak when it was overrun by an avalanche.
15	1970	Avalanche	Huascarán	Peru	1970 Huascarán debris avalanche. A massive debris avalanche, triggered by an earthquake, killed 30,000 people after it buried a town and ten villages. Among the dead were 15 Czech climbers who were climbing Huascarán at the time of the avalanche.
15	1954	Avalanche	Mount Fuji	Japan	1954 Mount Fuji avalanche. While holding training on snow, mountaineering clubs from several universities were caught in an avalanche.
15	1972	Avalanche	Manaslu	Nepal	1972 Manaslu avalanche. Avalanche buried the camp of a Korean expedition attempting the north-east face.
13	1954	Storm	Dachstein Mountains	Austria	Dachstein hiking disaster. Group of high school students and 3 teachers died in blizzard while hiking the Dachstein Mountains.
13	1996	Avalanche	Cotopaxi	Ecuador	1996 Cotopaxi avalanche. An avalanche buried the Refuge, a hut at 4,800m, on a busy day. An earthquake a few days prior may have weakened the glacier above the Refuge, contributing to the accident.
13	1963	Storm	Mount Yakushi	Japan	1963 Aichi University Mountaineering Club accident. During a winter ascent of the mountain, thirteen members of a university mountaineering club went missing. It is believed the heavy snowfall caused them to get lost, and lack of gear for warmth or navigation caused their deaths.
12	1980	Rockfall	Mount Fuji	Japan	1980 Mount Fuji rockfall. 12 died and 29 were injured when avalanche-like rockfall, with 50 to 60 boulders 1-2 meters in diameter, rolled down the Yoshida trail, affecting climbers between the eighth and sixth stations. It is the worst rockfall disaster in Japanese history.
12	1983	Avalanche	Mount Amida	Japan	1983 Mount Amida Avalanche. 12 people, including 11 members of a mountaineering club, were caught in an avalanche, and all were killed.
12	2021	Storm	Lamkhaga Pass	India	Lamkhaga Pass. Historic storms caused the deaths of at least 12 trekkers.
12	2012	Avalanche	Manaslu	Nepal	Avalanche swept through camp.
11	2004	Avalanche	Khan Tengri	Kyrgyzstan,Kazakhstan,China	Serac fell onto a large group of climbers, killing 11 and injuring 14.
11	1998	Avalanche	Near Les Orres, Hautes Alpes	France	A group of 32 children, aged 13 to 15, two teachers, and four mountaineering guides were caught in an avalanche while snowshoeing during a week long class as part of a school trip. The avalanche risk at the time was rated 4 out of 5, and a trail manager commented that the students had been taken on a slope with a steep incline.
11	2008	Avalanche	K2	Pakistan,China	2008 K2 disaster. Primarily caused by ice avalanche that occurred at the Bottleneck, destroying climbers' rope lines, leaving them unable to descend.
11	1967	Lightning	Mount Nishihotaka, Hida Mountains	Japan	Mount Nishihotaka lightning strike. While on a high school trip led by a teacher, a severe thunderstorm with hail struck the summit. While the party of 46 was descending, they were directly hit by lightning, killing eleven and injuring nine.
11	1913	Hypothermia & Storm	Mount Kisokoma	Japan	1913 Mount Kisokoma typhoon. A climb led by a school was interrupted by a typhoon. Several died of hypothermia while sheltering in a hut near the summit, and more died in the descent, trying to get to safety.
11	1968	Storm	Iztaccihuatl	Mexico	A storm with high winds and snow caught a group of 31 climbers on their way down. 11 of them died from hypothermia or falls.
11	2013	Terrorist attack	Nanga Parbat	Pakistan	2013 Nanga Parbat massacre. 16 terrorists stormed mountaineering base camp and killed 10 climbers and one guide.
11	2022	Avalanche	Marmolada	Italy	2022 Marmolada serac collapse. Triggered by serac collapse; ice and rock fell onto popular hiking trail that passed below the summit.
11	1981	Avalanche	Mount Rainier	United States	1981 Mount Rainier avalanche. Serac fall caused an avalanche/ice fall on the Ingraham Glacier
11	1955	Storm & Hypothermia	Jengish Chokusu	Kyrgyzstan, China	The first summit attempt ended in disaster, with 11 out of 12 expedion member killed in a blizzard.
10	2026	Avalanche	Broad Peak	Pakistan	2026 Broad Peak avalanche. The avalanche occurred at about 6,600 m (21,700 ft) on the slope between Camp 2 and Camp 3, sweeping all 10 climbers down the mountain.
10	1962	Storm & Hypothermia	Asahi-dake	Japan	During winter mountaineering training, 11 members of a university club were caught in a snowstorm. All but one perished due to hypothermia.
10	1993	Avalanche	Chimborazo	Ecuador	1993 Chimborazo avalanche. An avalanche buried a group of climbers in a crevasse at 18,700ft, below the Veintimilla summit.
10	1934	Storm	Nanga Parbat	Pakistan	1934 Nanga Parbat climbing disaster. Group of climbers trapped by storm at 7,480m (24,50 ft)
9	1959	Disputed	Dyatlov Pass	USSR	Dyatlov Pass Incident. A group of 9 hikers perished in the Ural Mountains. Without witnesses, cause of death disputed. Recent investigations in 2019 and 2021 concluded that an avalanche was the most likely cause.
9	1986	Storm	Mount Hood	United States	1986 Mount Hood disaster. Seven students and 2 adults caught in storm during high school trip to climb Mount Hood.
9	2012	Avalanche	Mont Maudit	France,Italy	Maudit avalanche. An avalanche caught a large group of climbers, killing nine and injuring an additional nine, during a dawn ascent from Cosmiques Hut.
9	1994	Avalanche	Mont Blanc	France,Italy	Nine climbers killed in ice avalanche on Mont Blanc.
9	1959	Avalanche	Mount Yari	Japan	Mount Yari avalanche. Members of a university mountaineering club were caught in an avalanche, killing 9.
9	2024	Storm	Between Lambtal and Sahastra Tal Peak	India	2024 Uttarakhand snowstorm disaster. Sudden whiteout stranded mountaineering group on peak without gear for the extreme conditions.
9	2026	Avalanche	Around Castle Peak and Frog Lake	United States	2026 Lake Tahoe avalanche. A group of eleven backcountry skiers and four guides were caught in an avalanche on a backcountry ski trip. Six survivors were able to dig themselves and others out of the avalanche.
8	2008	Avalanche	Mont Blanc du Tacul, Mont Blanc massif	France	Eight climbers killed due to serac fall before dawn.
8	1993	Avalanche	Grandes Jorasses, Mont Blanc Massif	France,Italy	100 meter ice and rock avalanche caught group of eighteen climbers, killing eight.
8	2009	Hypothermia & Storm	Mount Tomuraushi	Japan	2009 Mount Tomuraushi storm. 8 members of 18 person guided tour group died of hypothermia. After cold and fatigue from crossing snowfields in crampons in heavy winds and rain, a river crossing soaked participants, worsening their hypothermia until many succumbed. Notably, participants did have warm enough gear, but were too hypothermic to put it on
8	1940	Avalanche	Mount Petegari	Japan	1940 Mount Petegari avalanche. Nine members of Hokkaido University Mountaineering Club were caught in an avalanche. Only one survived.
8	1989	Storm & Hypothermia	Mount Tate	Japan	Tateyama disaster. A blizzard struck during a climb of the three peaks of Tateyama, and when the party, already fatigued, continued on from the first hut, eight members died of hypothermia. Many of the parties’ equipment was inadequate for the variable weather of that time of year, with most having light hiking boots, cotton pants, and vinyl rain gear.
8	1981	Fall	Mount Gongga	China	1981 Mount Gongga accident. Eight members of Japanese climbing team fell to their deaths.
8	2017	Avalanche	Chausuyama	Japan	2017 Nasu avalanche. 7 students and a teacher were killed when an avalanche struck a high school mountaineering club's training class.
8	2019	Avalanche	Nanda Devi	India	2019 Nanda Devi avalanche. A group of eight climbers were killed in an avalanche while attempting to summit a previously unclimbed subpeak of Nanda Devi.
8	1996	Storm	Mount Everest	Nepal,China	1996 Mount Everest disaster. 8 climbers caught in blizzard, including both guided teams on South Col and climbers on the North Face.
8	2003	Avalanche	Rysy	Poland	2003 Tatra Mountains avalanche. Members of high school sports club were swept in avalanche when attempting to climb Rysy in winter.
7	2015	Avalanche	Dôme de Neige des Écrins	France	Seven were killed in late summer avalanche in Écrins National Park.
7	2010	Avalanche	Diemtig Valley	Switzerland	A group of ski mountaineers trying to rescue skier swept in avalanche were caught in a second avalanche, killing seven.
7	1969	Avalanche	Dhaulagiri	Nepal	Seven members of an American team were killed in an avalanche while attempting the southeast ridge.
7	1967	Storm	Denali	United States	1967 Mount McKinley disaster. Blizzard killed group of climbers. Later analysis found winds were likely near 480 km/h (300mph), quite possibly the worst conditions experienced by any mountaineers on record.
7	2018	Storm	Pigne d'Arolla	Switzerland	Drama of the Valais Alps. Ski mountaineers descending Pigne d'Arolla in whiteout conditions perished due to hypothermia.
7	1955	Avalanche	Mount Temple	Canada	Seven youths were killed when avalanche swept down route
7	1959	Avalanche	Pico de Orizaba	Mexico	Expedition of 7 climbers went missing. Bodies were found in 2015
7	2013	Avalanche	Mount Masago	Japan	Avalanche on Mount Masago kills seven ski mountaineers.
7	1962	Storm	Bjelašnica	Yugoslavia	A group of 11 young men from Zemun, Serbia and Sarajevo, Bosnia and Herzegovina tried to reach the summit, 7 of them died.
6	2021	Avalanche	Chimborazo	Ecuador	2021 Chimborazo avalanche. An avalanche swept 16 climbers, killing six, at 6,100m (20,000ft).
6	2016	Avalanche	Pas du Roc, Massif des Cerces	France	Valfréjus avalanche. French Foreign Legionnaires were caught in avalanche while participating in a ski mountaineering exercise.
6	1930	Hypothermia	Mount Tsurugi	Japan	Tsurugi Hut Avalanche Accident. Six members of a university mountaineering club were killed when an avalanche enveloped the mountain hut they were staying in. They were attempting a winter climb of the mountain.
6	1934	Hypothermia	Mount Asama	Japan	Ministry of Railways Mountaineering Accident. Six members of the Ministry of Railways Mountaineering club were caught in an avalanche while attempting a winter climb of the mountain. It is believed they died during ski descent.
6	1980	Undetermined	Mount Karamatsu	Japan	High School Happo-one Mountaineering Accident. A high school teacher led five students on a winter climb of the mountain from Happo-one Ridge. The bodies were not located until May the following year. The teacher had almost no winter mountaineering experience, and the group had left their tent and compass behind.
6	2015	Avalanche	Queyras mountain range	France	Six ski mountaineers were killed when an avalanche swept them while trekking at 7,900ft.
6	2007	Avalanche	Jungfrau	Switzerland	A group of 14 soldiers were scaling Jungfrau in a mountaineering training exercise, when they were caught in an avalanche, killing six.
6	2016	Avalanche	Monte Nevoso	Italy	Avalanche swept group of ski mountaineers at 3,000m (9,800ft).
6	1965	Avalanche	Hidaka Mountains	Japan	Hokkaido University Mountaineering club accident. Six Hokkaido University Mountaineering Club members were caught in an avalanche, likely while at camp, during a 14-day trip to climb several mountains in the area. One of the members had survived in a snow cave for four days before perishing.
6	1995	Avalanche	Mount Kisokoma	Japan	1995 Mount Kisokoma avalanche. 6 climbers were caught and killed in avalanche near Senjojiki Cirque.
6	1970	Avalanche	Mount Everest	Nepal,China	1970 Mount Everest disaster. Khumbu Icefall collapsed, killing six Sherpa porters.
6	1971	Storm	Cairngorm Plateau	United Kingdom	Cairngorm Plateau disaster. Six 15-year-old students and two leaders were stranded in a blizzard, perishing of exposure. Britain's worst mountaineering accident.
6	1974	Avalanche	Mount Everest	Nepal,China	1974 French Mount Everest expedition. French expedition attempted West Ridge Direct on Everest, but were killed by an avalanche.
6	2012	Hypothermia	Hakuba	Japan	Mount Hakuba disaster. Six doctors on a group climb of Mount Hakuba were found dead due to hypothermia. All were experienced and had warm gear in their packs, but were not found wearing it. Most likely, sudden heavy snowfall caused hypothermia, resulting in confusion.
6	1993	Disputed	Khamar-Daban mountains	Kazakhstan	Khamar-Daban incident. 6 hikers died under disputed circumstances. According to autopsy, 5 died from hypothermia, and one died of heart attack.
6	1995	Storm	K2	Pakistan,China	1995 K2 disaster. Six perished while returning from the summit, due to violent storm, with winds possibly up to 160 kph (100 mph).
6	1939	Cornice collapse	Mount Baker	United States	Six climbers fell to deaths when cornice collapsed
6	2014	Fall	Mount Rainier	United States	Two guides and four clients fell to death on Liberty Ridge route. Possibly caused by avalanche.
6	2024	Hypothermia and Storm	Tête Blanche	France	Six ski tourers died of hypothermia while caught in a storm.
6	1953	Fall	Mount Taranaki	New Zealand	Roped group of seven from a tramping club fell off Mount Taranaki's Hongi bluff, with only one survivor. Conditions deteriorated during the descent, resulting in icy conditions, and climbers primarily had ski poles, with only one having an ice axe and crampons.
6	1990	Fall	Mount Ruapehu	New Zealand	Seven soldiers, out of a party of thirteen, perished due to hypothermia when caught in blizzard during week-long mountaineering training.
6	1991	Fall	Annapurna	Nepal	Two Korean climbers and four guides were killed by an avalanche.
5	2026	Storm	Mount Elbrus	Russia	In the 2026 Mount Elbrus tragedy, five climbers from a seven-member expedition from Bosnia and Herzegovina perished in a sudden storm, while two survived.
5	1930	Unknown	Aoraki / Mount Cook	New Zealand	One guide and four women killed on Tasman Glacier, cause undetermined.
5	2000	Avalanche	Tour Ronde,Mont Blanc massif	France,Italy	Eighteen caught in an avalanche on the Tour Ronde ascent of Mont Blanc, killing five and injuring thirteen others.
5	2025	Avalanche	Rimpfischhorn	Switzerland	Bodies of climbers found near avalanche cone, after their abandoned skis were found.
5	1916	Hypothermia	Okuchichibu Mountains	Japan	Okuchichibu disaster. Group got lost in Okuchichibu mountains, resulting in five people perishing of hypothermia.
5	2011	Avalanche	Haute Route	Switzerland	Five people were killed when an avalanche hit a party of eleven people, equipped with snow shoes and skis, who were undertaking the Haute Route.
5	1986	Storm	K2	Pakistan,China	1986 K2 disaster. Storm trapped climbers at Camp IV, with no food and no gas to melt snow into water.
5	1981	Fall	Mount Hood	United States	Mount Hood climbing accidents. Five members of Mazamas died from a fall from Cooper Spur during their descentl.
5	1994	Hypothermia & Storm	Azuma Mountain Range	Japan	Azuma Mountain Range accident. Group of seven ski tourers couldn't find their hut for the night, with five eventually succumbing the next day to hypothermia.
5	1972	Avalanche	Asahi-dake	Japan	Asahi-dake avalanche. Avalanche hit group of camping university students.
5	1973	Avalanche	Yarihara	Japan	1973 Yarihara avalanche. Avalanche hit camping university mountaineering club.
5	1950	Avalanche	Mount Tanigawa	Japan	Tanigawa avalanche. 11 members of a high school mountaineering club were caught in an avalanche, killing five.
5	2013	Unknown, possibly avalanche	Kangchenjunga	Nepal, India	2013 Kanchenjunga accident. Five climbers disappeared during the descent.
5	2024	Unknown, possibly avalanche	Dhaulagiri I	Nepal	2024 Dhaulagiri accident. Five Russian climbers went missing, possibly due to an avalanche.
5	1973	Avalanche	Annapurna	Nepal	Four Japanese climbers and one Nepalese climber were killed in an avalanche.
5	2002	Avalanche	Shishapangma	China	Five members of university club killed on west face by avalanche.
5	2020	Avalanche	Dachstein range	Austria	Five snowshoers were killed by large avalanche.
5	2017	Fall	Mount Harvey (Britannia Range)	Canada	Five hikers died after a snow cornice collapsed, sending them over a cliff.
5	1989	Avalanche	Mount Everest	Nepal,China	Lho La tragedy An avalanche at the Lho La pass killed five members of a Polish expedition
4	2019	Storm	Giewont	Poland	Tatra Mountains. On August 22, four people died and 56 were hospitalized during a thunderstorm on Giewont. In total, that day, five people died and 157 were hospitalized across the entire Tatra Mountains during an intense thunderstorm.
4	1977	Hut Failure & Storm	Aoraki / Mount Cook	New Zealand	Four climbers were killed when the hut they were staying in, the Three Johns Hut, was pulled off its foundation from wind and thrown into the valley below.
4	1865	Fall	Matterhorn	Switzerland, Italy	First ascent of the Matterhorn. During first ascent of the Matterhorn, one man fell, pulling the other three down the north face.
4	1936	Avalanche	Eiger	Switzerland	1936 Eiger climbing disaster. Avalanche caught an already injured and exhausted party attempting to descend the north face.
4	2019	Avalanche	Aletsch Glacier	Switzerland	Four ski tourers killed in an avalanche on the way to Konkordia hut.
4	1998	Avalanche	Aonach Mor	United Kingdom	4 climbers were killed in avalanche.
4	1993	Avalanche	Khan Tengri	Kyrgyzstan,Kazakhstan,China	Four killed when avalanche swept camp.
4	1997	Volcanic gas poisoning	Mount Adatara	Japan	Mount Adatara volcanic gas disaster. 14 members of a climb lost their way in fog, and accidentally entered a restricted area, resulting in four dying of hydrogen sulfide poisoning from inhaling volcanic gases.
4	2007	Avalanche	Mount Kamihorokamettoku	Japan	2007 Mount Kamihorokamettoku avalanche. A group of eleven training on snow were caught in an avalanche near the crater, and four were killed.
4	2009	Avalanche	Ren Zhong Feng	China	A collapsing serac caused a massive avalanche, which likely buried a Hungarian team attempting first climb of the mountain.
4	2013	Avalanche	Bidean nam Bian	United Kingdom	4 were killed in avalanche close to Church Door Buttress on the north side. The worst avalanche in Scottish history.
4	2012	Avalanche	Denali	United States	Four climbers died in an avalanche
4	1954	Fall	Mount Victoria	Canada	Three climbers and guide, roped together, fell to their deaths climbing Victoria Glacier
4	2023	Fall	Pico de Orizaba	Mexico	Four climbers killed in a fall while climbing the southern slope
4	2003	Avalanche	Mount Tasman	New Zealand	An avalanche caught a party of six, killing three guides and one climber.
4	2024	Avalanche	Auvergne Region	France	An avalanche in Val d’Enfer killed four ski mountaineers.
4	2006	Avalanche	K2	Pakistan,China	Four Russian climbers killed in an avalanche
4	1905	Fall	Kangchenjunga	Nepal,India	1905 Kanchenjunga expedition. Behavioral issues with the team leader, Aleister Crowley, resulted in team deciding to retreat to Camp III. During this retreat, a fall precipitated an avalanche that killed four.
4	1987	Fall	Lhotse	Nepal,China	1987 Lhotse accident. Four Spanish climbers fell 1,500 meters to their deaths in an avalanche.
4	1959	Fall	Cho Oyu	Nepal,China	1959 Cho Oyu accident. Four killed in an avalanche.
4	1984	Avalanche	Nanga Parbat	Pakistan	Four Japanese climbers went missing while attempting the Rupal face.
4	1998	Avalanche	Gasherbrum I	Pakistan, China	Four Japanese climbers were killed in an avalanche.
4	1987	Avalanche	Gasherbrum I	Pakistan, China	Four Pakistani men killed in an avalanche.
4	1997	Unreleased	Königspitze	Italy	Four men fell to their deaths climbing the mountain.
4	1996	Avalanche	Mont Blanc	France,Italy	Four die in avalanche on Mont Blanc.
4	2021	Avalanche	Col du Galibier	France	Avalanche struck group of hikers, killing four.
4	2021	Avalanche	Mount Velino	Italy	Four missing hikers were likely swept by avalanche.
4	2021	Avalanche	Pic du Midi de Bigorre	France	Group was 300 feet below summit when snow shelf gave way, killing four.
4	1967	Storm & Hypothermia	Sandelvbreen	Norway	Group of seven on ski mountaineering trip got caught in storm.
4	1987	Unknown, possibly Avalanche	Shishapangma	China	Four men from German expedition missing, likely due to avalanche.

== Notes ==
1.While the Hakkōda Mountains disaster is considered to be the worst accident in mountain climbing history, the victims were soldiers, not mountaineers.
2.Similar to the Hakkōda Mountains disaster, the victims of the Tragedy of Antuco were soldiers, not mountaineers.

== See also ==
- 2014 Mount Ontake eruption
- Gansu ultramarathon disaster
- List of deaths on eight-thousanders
- List of Mount Everest death statistics
- List of mountaineering disasters in Europe by death toll
- List of mountaineering disasters in North America by death toll
- List of people who died climbing Mount Everest
- Mount Hood climbing accidents
