= Tsurugi =

Tsurugi may refer to:

== Places ==
- Tsurugi, Ishikawa, Japan
- Tsurugi, Tokushima, Japan
- Mount Tsurugi, Japan

== People ==
- Tsurugi Watanabe (渡邉 剣; born 1996), Japanese actor and television personality
- Kagami Tsurugi, a fictional character in the animated series Miraculous: Tales of Ladybug & Cat Noir
- Hunter knight tsurugi, a fictional character in the 2006 Tokusatsu series Ultraman Mebius
- Kamashiro Tsurugi, A Fictional Character who is also Kamen rider Sasword from Another 2006 Tokusatsu Series Kamen rider Kabuto

== Other uses ==
- Tsurugi (sword), a type of Japanese sword
- Tsurugi butai ("strike force Tsurugi"), an alternate name for the World War II Japanese Air Group 343 Kōkūtai, after the tsurugi Japanese sword
- Tsurugi (train), a train service in Japan
- Tsurugi-class patrol vessel
- Nakajima Ki-115 aircraft, known as Tsurugi

== See also ==
- Tsurugisan (train)
