= 2024 Uttarakhand snowstorm disaster =

2024 death of nine Indian climbers in Himalayan blizzard

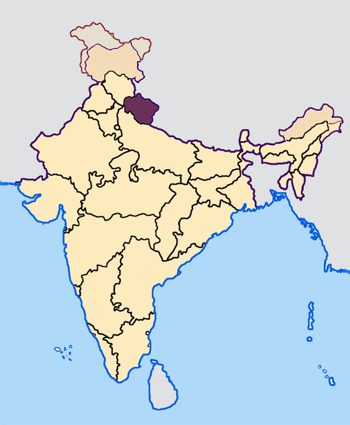
- Uttarakhand in India
- Date: June 1–5, 2024
- Time: Blizzard started ~14:00 (IST)
- Location: Between Lambtal and Sahastra Tal peak
- Cause: Blizzard
- Organized by: Karnataka Mountaineering Association
- Participants: 22
- Deaths: 9
- Injuries: 13

In June 2024, nine Indian mountaineers died when a blizzard struck their location as they were trekking in the remote Himalayas in Uttarakhand state in north India.

== Background ==
On 29 May 2024, nineteen members of the Karnataka Mountaineering Association from Bengaluru in the southern Indian state of Karnataka began a 35-kilometer long high-altitude trek with three local guides in the remote Sahasra Tal area across the Himalayas. The group was planning to return by 8 June 2024.

== Disaster ==
On 3 June 2024 at around 14:00 (GMT+5:30), heavy snowfall struck the mountaineer group after reaching Lambtal and as they moved to Sahastra Tal peak at an elevation of about 12,000 feet, which intensified into blizzard conditions that lasted for four hours. The wind escalated to roughly 90 kilometres per hour, with the snow darkening and lowering the trekkers' field of vision. The group attempted to turn back to base camp in Lambtal to alert other mountaineers of their situation. By 18:00 (GMT+5:30), two mountaineers had died from the severe snow and wind in front of the group, which in addition to visibility dropping to near zero, made movement and orientation nearly impossible. The mountaineer group was forced to cluster together under a large rock to endure the night, where more mountaineers succumbed to the weather conditions. Two other mountaineers died on the morning of 4 June 2024, with five more succumbing on 5 June 2024.

On 4 June 2024 evening, a local guide was able to alert rescuers about their situation after being able to connect to a mobile network, and at 5 June 2024, the Indian Air Force reached the team with two Chetak helicopters and a private helicopter to evacuate the 13 survivors to Dehradun. The State Disaster Response Force also dispatched two teams to the location.

== Aftermath ==
An Indian health official stated that the likely cause of death was hypothermia in addition to dehydration, exacerbated by the severe cold preventing them from drinking water.

On the evening of 6 June 2024, the bodies of the deceased were airlifted from near the site of the disaster in Joshimath to Dehradun, to be transported by road to Delhi and then by air from Delhi to Bengaluru.

== List of deceased ==
All of the victims were from Bengaluru, Karnataka.

- Asha Sudhakar, 71
- Anitha Rangappa, 55
- Venkatesh Prasad K., 53
- Vinayak Mungurwadi, 54
- Sujata Mungurwadi, 51
- Padmanabha K. P., 50
- Chitra Praneeth, 48
- Sindhu Wakelam, 44
- Padmini Hegde, 34

== See also ==
- List of mountaineering disasters by death toll
- 2023 Himalayan floods
- 2022 Uttarakhand avalanche
