= Tatra Volunteer Search and Rescue =

Tatrzańskie Ochotnicze Pogotowie Ratunkowe
- Abbreviation: TOPR
- Formation: October 29, 1909
- Type: NGO
- Registration no.: KRS 0000032187
- Location: Zakopane, Poland
- Region served: Tatra Mountains
- Leader: Bolesław Pietrzyk
- Website: https://topr.pl/

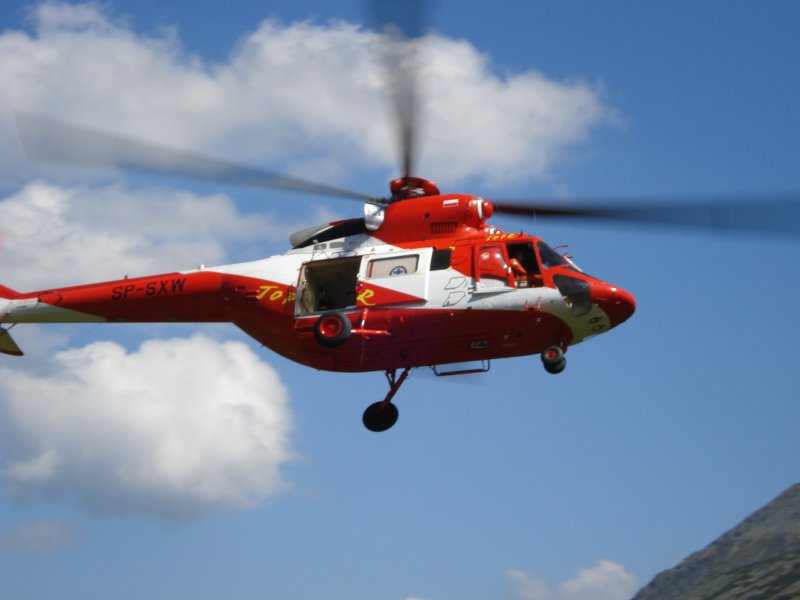
TOPR PZL W-3 helicopter

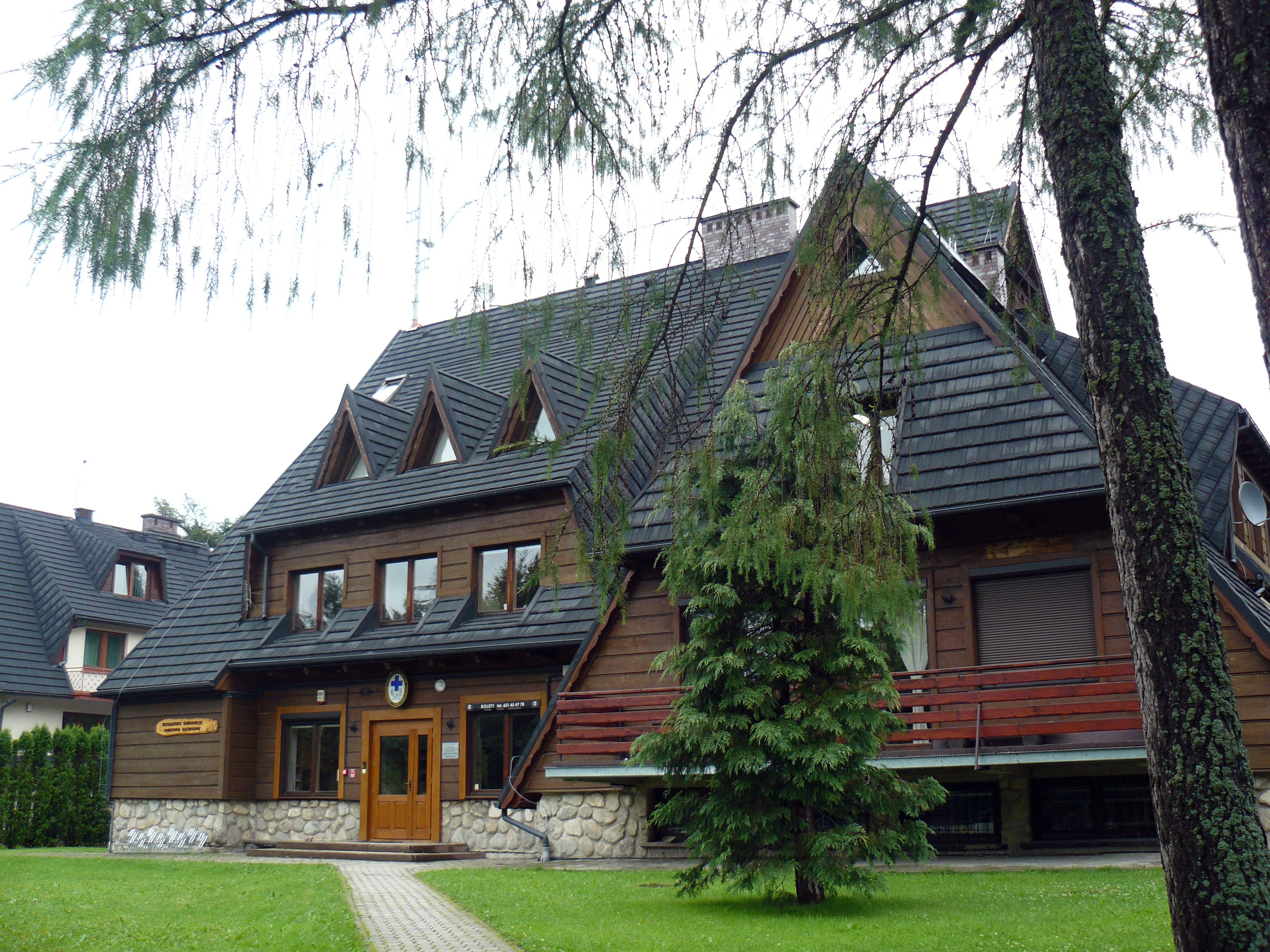
TOPR headquarters in Zakopane

Tatra Volunteer Search and Rescue (Polish: Tatrzańskie Ochotnicze Pogotowie Ratunkowe (TOPR)) is a non-profit association in Poland, that perform mountain rescue activities with Polish Ministry of the Interior and Administration consent, rescuing stranded mountain climbers, tourists, skiers, and others in need of rescue in the Polish Tatra Mountains. It is one of the oldest mountain rescue associations in the world.

Each potential rescuer is required to complete a special training course (lasting between 1.5 and 3 years), in which every volunteer is to exhibit excellent knowledge in Tatra topography as well as practical abilities including climbing, skiing, spelunking, lifesaving and first aid. After completing the training the rescuer takes an oath on the director's hand.

In 2011 TOPR consisted of around 250 members, 140 of whom had acquired permission to participate in rescue missions. The majority of the rescuers are volunteers; only 33 are professional rescuers.As of 2024, the number increased to 48

Unlike many other mountain rescue organizations, TOPR does not charge any payment for rescues, being forbidden from doing so by Polish law. Instead, the organization is funded by Poland's internal affairs ministry, donations from individuals and companies, and entry fees to the Tatra National Park. Jan Krzysztof, head of TOPR rescue division, is constantly against charging tourists any rescue fee.

== History ==
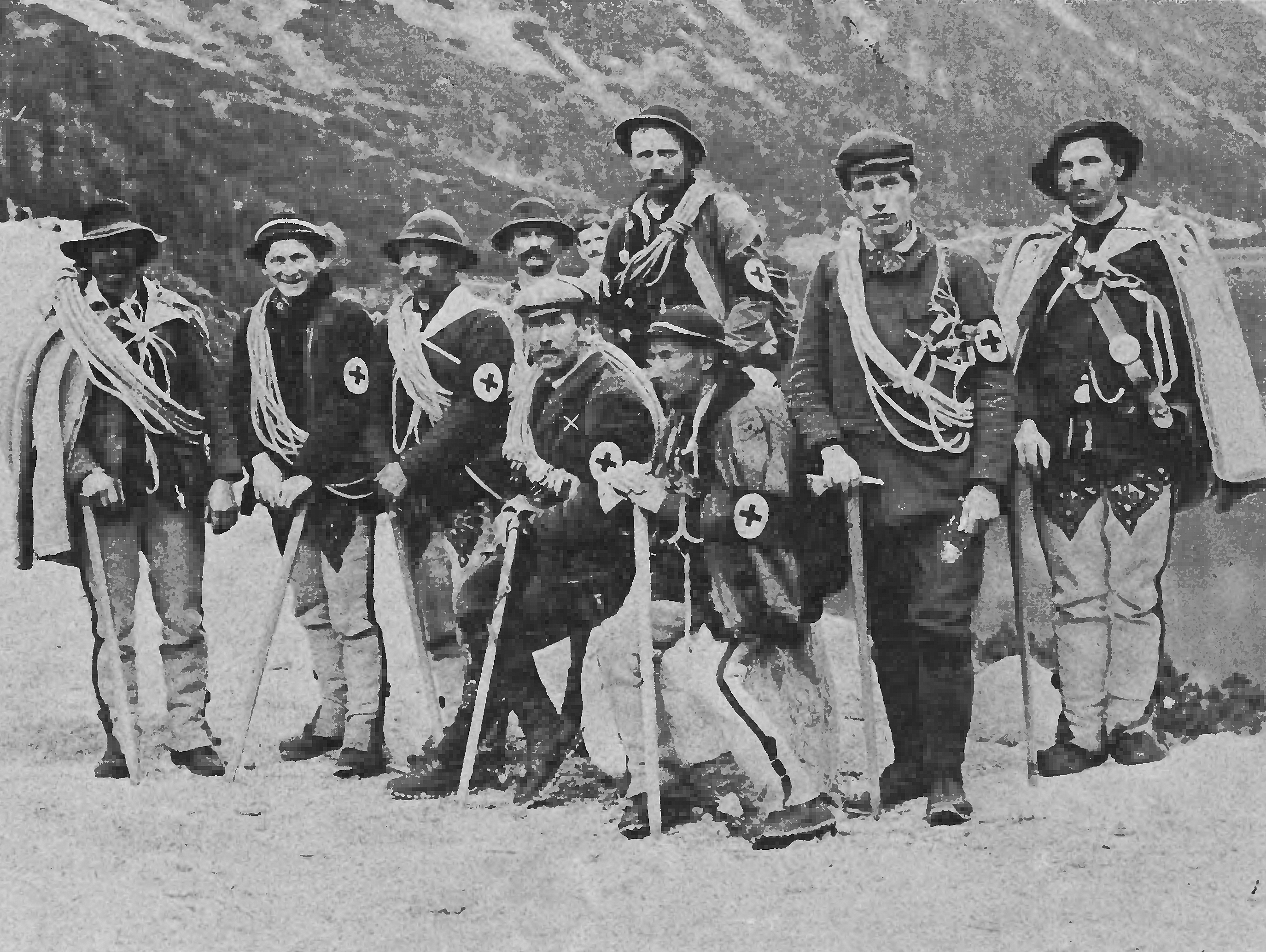
Tatra Mountains rescue team during Prof. Weiss search and rescue operation. In the middle, one of the TOPR founders, Mariusz Zaruski (x), on his right mountain guide Klemens Bachleda (1909)

The initial project launch of the mountain rescue association began in 1908. The death of a Polish composer Mieczysław Karłowicz by avalanche hastened the creation of the organization, which was ultimately registered on 29 October 1909 in Lwów, Poland. under its current name with Kazimierz Dłuski as the president and Mariusz Zaruski as the director. The TOPR headquarters, Dworzec Tatrzański, are located in Zakopane.

In 1910, during a rescue mission on the northern wall of the Small Javorovy Peak, one of the rescuers, Klemens Bachleda, died in a rockfall, despite the distinct order of the director commanding Klemens to abort the operation due to weather conditions. The heroic sacrifice was in vain as the mountaineer, Stanisław Szulakiewicz, was dead by the time the team reached him.

During the first few years TOPR consisted of only 11 rescuers. The number of volunteers increased until in 1939, 20 years after its launch, TOPR had 50 trained rescuers.

In 1939, after the World War II outbreak, TOPR ceased to function and people of Zakopane scattered across the country. In 1940, during the German occupation of Poland, Germany was able to influence TOPR to resume its rescue services and TOPR operated as Freiwillige Tatra Bergwacht for the duration of the war.

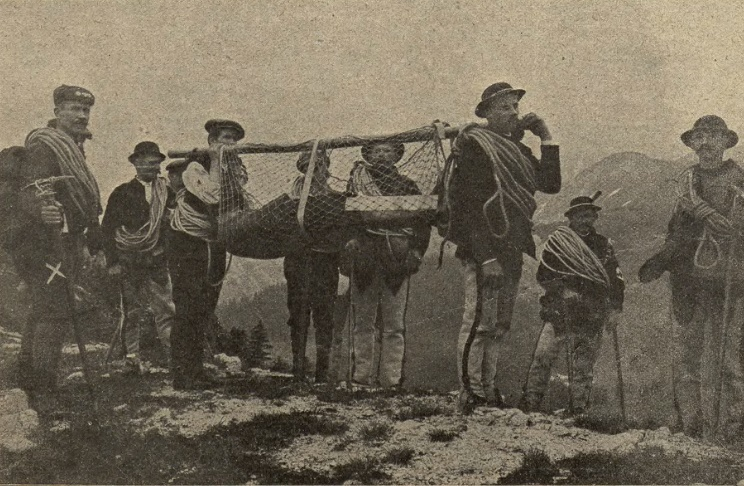
Transport of the injured

In 1952, the Tatra Volunteer Rescue Service was incorporated into GOPR.

TOPR first used a helicopter during a rescue mission in 1963. Tadeusz Augustyniak, an experienced rescue pilot and an honorary member of the organization, operated the SM-1. The vehicle transported a tourist with a broken leg from the Valley of the Five Lakes to a hospital in Zakopane.

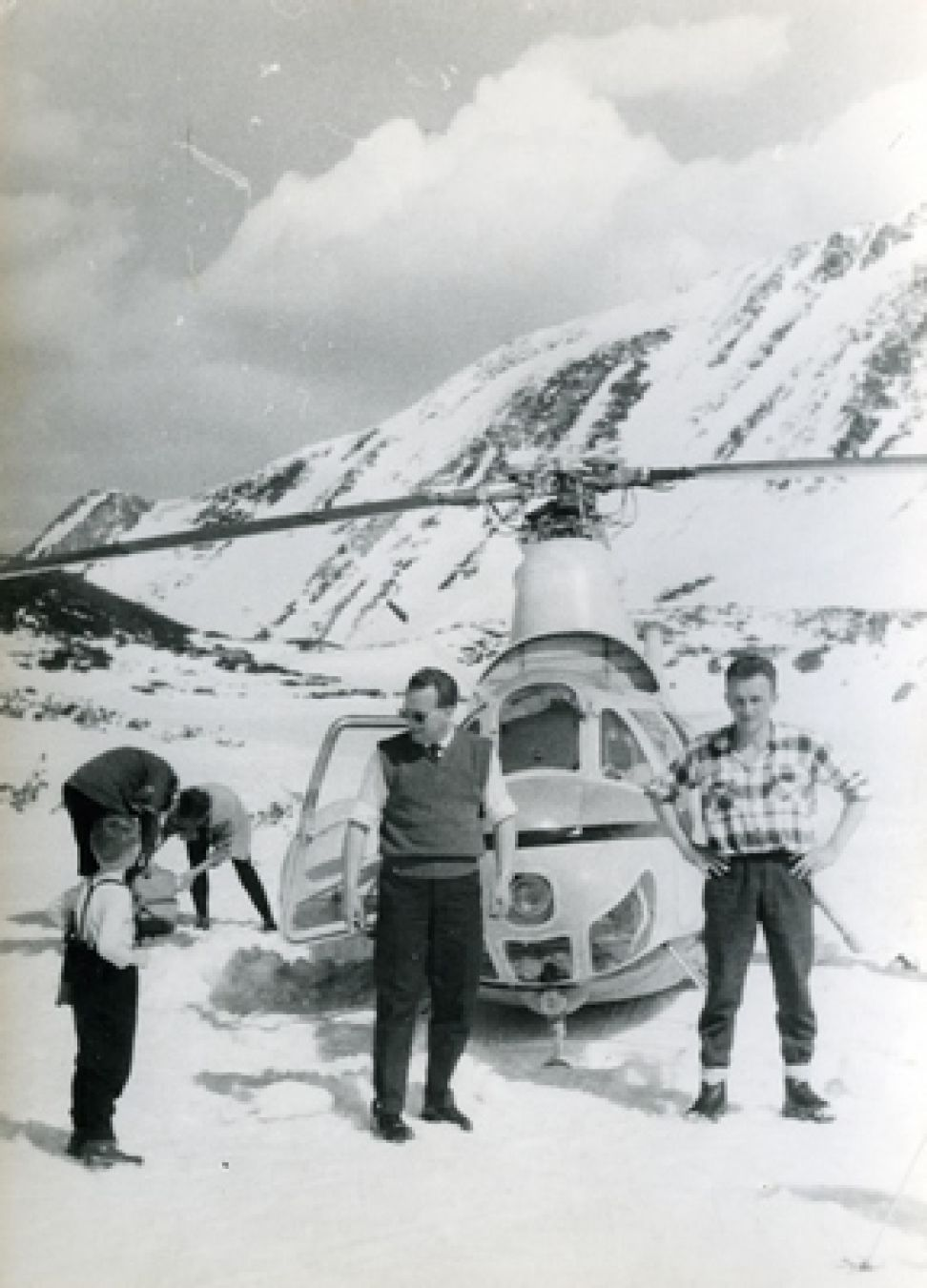
TOPR Rescuers operating an SM-1 helicopter

Michał Jagiełło was head of the Tatra Volunteer Search and Rescue group from 1972 to 1974. In 1974, the rescuers adopted Cygan, a German shepherd dog, and trained him to assist in avalanche rescue.

In 1991, TOPR became an independent organization and was withdrawn from GOPR. A year later, the President of Poland, Lech Wałęsa, awarded the Tatra rescuers with a PZL W-3 Sokół. The new vehicle had a more advanced hovering system than the MI-2 used prior, and thus made rescue missions in the higher, less accessible areas of the mountains safer. PZL W-3 Sokół had an increased weight capacity as well, allowing the transport of more rescuers. Less than 3 years later, the aircraft crashed during a rescue operation. Two pilots (Bogusław Arendarczyk and Janusz Rybicki) and 2 rescuers (Janusz Kubica and Stanisław Mateja) were killed.

In 1994, SP-SXT PZL W-3 Sokół was destroyed in Dolina Olczyska air disaster. 4 TOPR rescuers on-board died because of rotor blade delamination. A video had been recorded by a nearby tourist with camera, and was later published on YouTube .

In 1999 Tatra Search and Rescue was incorporated in International Commission for Alpine Rescue (IKAR).

The most tragic disaster in the Tatra Mountains occurred in January 2003. A group of high school students from Tychy heading towards Rysy mountain were caught in an avalanche, resulting in 8 fatalities. During the second day of the rescue mission, a critical error occurred in one of the helicopters, "Sokół", halting the functions of both of the engines. The pilot, Henryk Serda, was able to perform autorotation landing, causing major damage to the vehicle but avoiding harm to any terrestrial objects. Shortly after the incident the pilot was fired for breaking the aviation safety laws. Henryk re-appealed and was found innocent due to discrepancies in the officials' reports. A vehicle inspection, confirmed by the manufacturer, raised the possibility "Sokół" may have not been maintained properly. This tragedy was adapted into a movie, "Cisza" (The Silence), premiered in 2010.

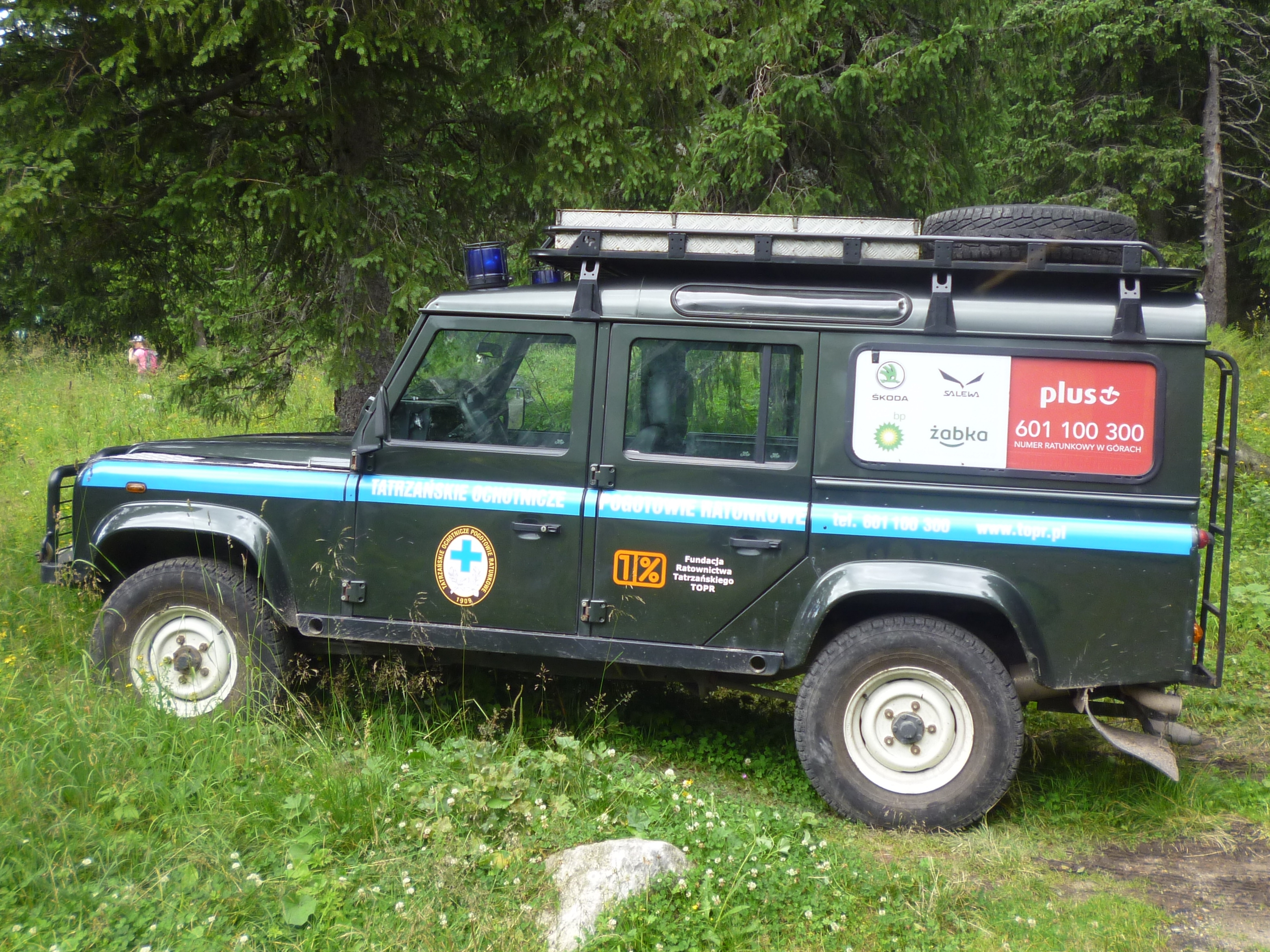
Land Rover Defender in Tatra Mountains

== Activity statistics ==
TOPR activities	Year					
TOPR activities	2014	2016	2019	2020	2021	2022
Total rescue operations	472	592	712	606	969	939
tourist rescue	421	493		532	849	822
climber rescues	22	22		29	29	26
caver rescues	2	1		3	2	3
skier / skitour rescues	11	22		12	53	34
biker rescues		5		1	3	4
other		49		27	31	47
false alarms				2	3	2
Total people assisted	551	709	1018	691	1109	1089
