= 1980 Pilsko incident =

Disappearance of students in Pilsko

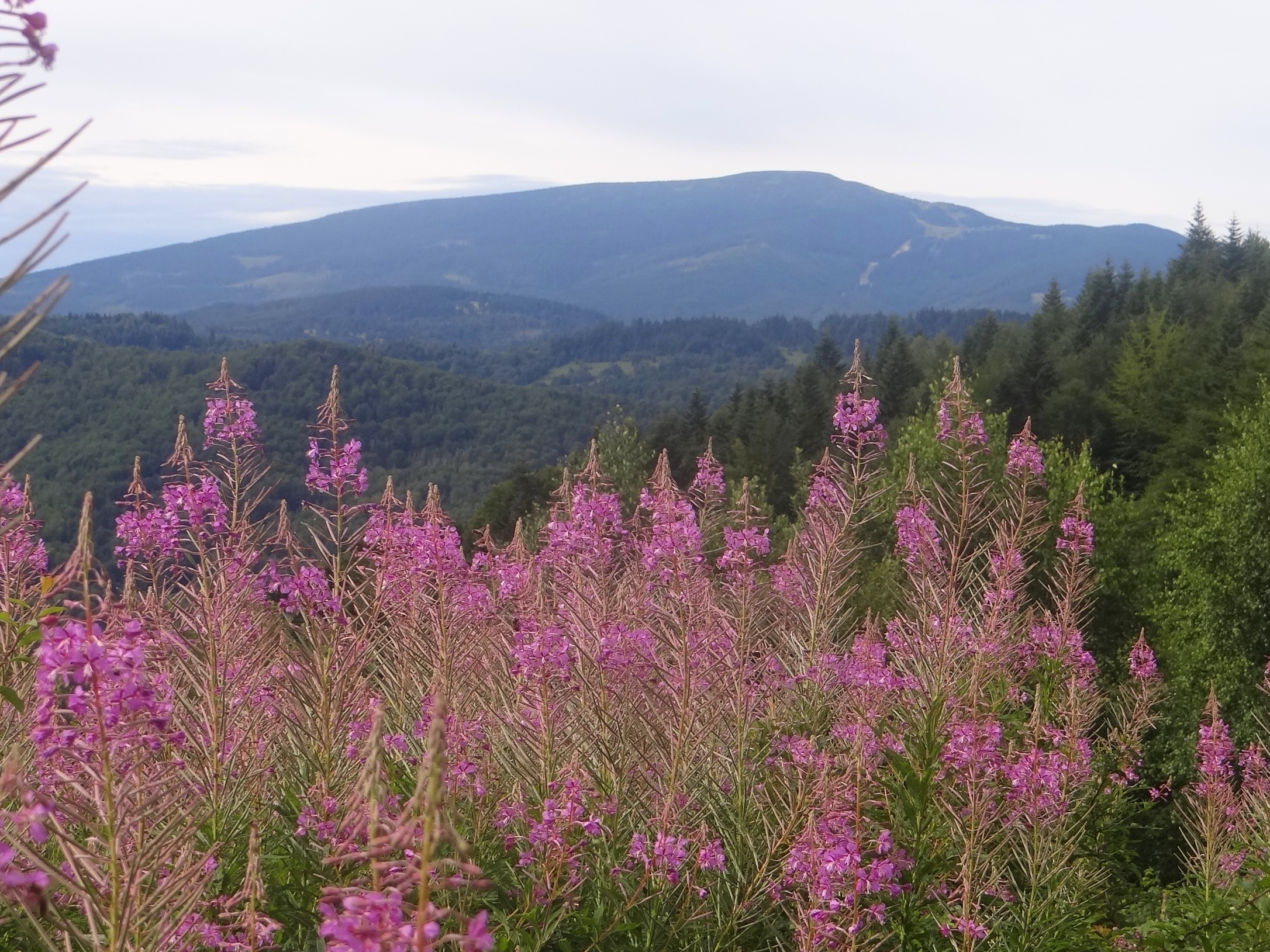
- Pilsko
- Date: 27 December 1980
- Time: 7:00 PM (CET)
- Location: Slopes of Pilsko Poland Czechoslovakia; 49°31′38″N 19°19′06″E
- Type: Mountain accident

The 1980 Pilsko incident was the disappearance of a group of 16 students from Primary School No. 12 in Kalisz (a sports school specializing in athletics) during a field trip to the summit of Pilsko on 27 December 1980. (Note: A year later, the press reported another incident involving missing teenagers on Pilsko – in December 1981, five students from schools in Częstochowa, aged 16 and 17, got lost. The rescue operation lasted about 16 hours, and the teenagers were found on the Czechoslovak side. The accident victims were unable to continue walking, despite the assistance of two rescuers; they waited until 4 AM for the next group of rescuers. The rescue operations were conducted despite equipment shortages at the Beskid Mountain Volunteer Search and Rescue; at the time, they had two UAZ vehicles, and the dispatch station had two telephones, one of which was out of service.) The group got lost in difficult weather conditions and wandered the slopes from the afternoon until the following morning, eventually being guided back to the summit in severe weather conditions by a Slovak forester. They were found by a Polish customs officer and a Czechoslovak engineer, after which they were transported to a forester's lodge. Three people, the oldest boys in the group, did not survive the incident.

== Course of events ==
Students from the sports school in Kalisz had been attending a training camp in Korbielów since 22 December. On 27 December, a group of 16 teenagers (5 girls aged 12–14 and 11 boys aged 14–17) set out for Hala Miziowa under the supervision of coach Krzysztof Kisiel. One of the boys, Ireneusz Langwerski, was the Polish junior champion in race walking over 10 km. Before setting out, one of the girls withdrew from the hike due to feeling unwell and remained at the center. The group completed the route in 1 hour and 15 minutes (with an estimated hiking time of 2 hours and 30 minutes) and reached Hala Miziowa at 11:20 AM. Despite their lack of preparation (no warm clothing or footwear – the group members were wearing light athletic shoes and jackets, and had insufficient supplies of food and warm drinks), the coach agreed to let the teenagers take the yellow trail to the summit of Pilsko, which was reached around 12:00 PM. Then, the group headed toward the Glinne Pass in adverse weather conditions (a drop in temperature and deep snow). However, they took a wrong turn and descended onto the Czechoslovak side, from where they were turned back to the summit by a forester. He informed them about a hunt taking place and warned them of a fine for illegally crossing the border. According to some sources, he also threatened the hikers with a gun. In a television interview, the forester stated that he was frightened by the group because they "approached him from behind".

The coach decided to return via Pilsko, which the group reached around 4:00 PM. There, they got lost again. Weather conditions deteriorated further, with the temperature dropping to –12 °C, and fog and a snowstorm beginning. The first to die was 16-year-old Leszek Śledź. The coach and his colleagues spent two hours trying to resuscitate him by rubbing his arms and back. After the boy's death, the coach decided that the group would continue on. Along the way, the teenagers sang Christmas carols, prayed, and tried to stay awake. The next two victims, the oldest boys, died after falling asleep. Before that, they cleared the way through the snowdrifts for the others and gave them some of their clothing. Furthermore, as a forensic expert noted, they were aware of the gravity of the situation, which is why they lost their strength more quickly. Although the coach tried to save the children's lives by giving them his own clothes, this did not have the expected results. He decided to leave the deceased where they were and continue searching for a safe route. The group wandered around the summit of Pilsko until the next morning and once again descended to the Czechoslovak side. After a 21-hour march, they was found around 7:00 AM by Polish customs officer Józef Bolk and Czechoslovak forestry engineer Ludovit Janiak, who provided assistance and brought them to Mutné. The participants were transported to the forester's lodge in a Moskvich car in two trips, some of them suffering from frostbite on their faces, ears, fingers, and toes. Between 9:30 PM and 4:30 AM, three boys died (the second death occurred around 11:00 PM).

== Rescue operation ==
The rescue operation began at 4:00 AM. One of the reasons for the late start was a lack of communication, even though the group had been reported missing at least 12 hours earlier. Meanwhile, 30 rescuers from the Beskid Group of the Mountain Volunteer Search and Rescue and the Border Protection Forces searched for the missing group throughout the night. The operation was led by Adam Kubala, then head of the Beskid Group.

== Repercussions ==
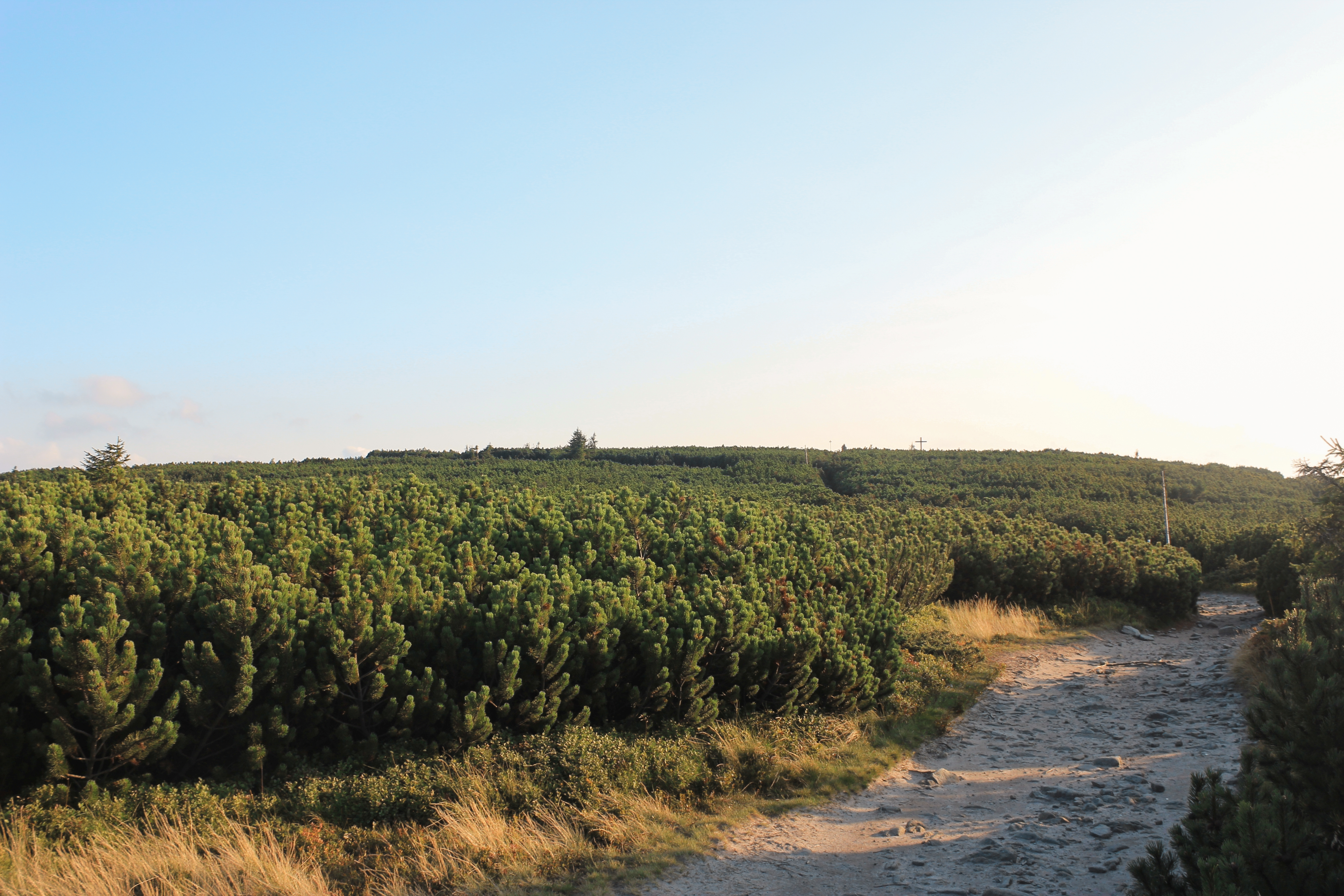
Summit of Pilsko

The accident was widely reported and discussed in the press. Some commentators blamed the coach directly for the tragedy, as well as the Calisia Kalisz sports club. Marian Bielecki, head of the Beskid Group of the Mountain Volunteer Search and Rescue, among others, pointed out negligence and repeated violations of regulations regarding the organization of trips. According to the regulations in effect at the time, mountain hiking trips above 1,000 meters above sea level could only be organized for children over 14 years of age from 15 June to 15 September under the supervision of a guide or a mountain tourism leader. Some critics focused on the attitude of the Mountain Volunteer Search and Rescue, which not only began the rescue operation too late but also accused the participants of the hike of lying. After the incident, the Bielsko-Biała voivode issued a ban on winter travel in the Beskids above the tree line at the request of the Mountain Volunteer Search and Rescue. Commenting on the matter, Jacek Kolbuszewski stated in the Wierchy magazine that such an accident was bound to happen given the state of mountain tourism in the country at the time, and commented on the voivode's order: "One can get lost in the forest, too". Coach Kisiel was acquitted of the charge of involuntary manslaughter.

== Victims ==
- Ireneusz Langwerski (aged 17)
- Leszek Śledź (aged 16)
- Marek Witczak (aged 14)
