= 2026 Mount Elbrus tragedy =

Mountaineering accident on July 25, 2026

- Date: July 25, 2026
- Location: Mount Elbrus, Kabardino-Balkaria, Russia
- Cause: Sudden weather deterioration, altitude sickness, loss of orientation (under investigation)
- Participants: Seven-member expedition from Bosnia and Herzegovina
- Deaths: 5
- Injuries: 2

The 2026 Mount Elbrus tragedy was a mountaineering accident that occurred on July 25, 2026, during a final ascent of Mount Elbrus, the highest peak in Russia and Europe. The accident involved a seven-member expedition from Bosnia and Herzegovina, which was at an altitude of more than 5,100 meters when weather conditions suddenly deteriorated. Five members of the expedition died, while two survived.

According to Russian investigative authorities, the accident was contributed to by a sudden deterioration in weather conditions, reduced visibility, difficulty in orientation, and health issues related to high altitude. An investigation was launched after the accident to determine the exact circumstances of the event.

The circumstances of the event were similar to the 2021 Mount Elbrus incident, in which five climbers also died following a sudden deterioration in weather conditions during their descent from the mountain.

== Mount Elbrus ==
Mount Elbrus (5,642 m) is a dormant volcano located in the western part of the Caucasus and is the highest peak in Russia. According to the standard geographical division of Europe, it is also considered the highest peak on the European continent. The mountain is located in the Russian republic of Kabardino-Balkaria.

The standard southern route to Elbrus is technically considered less demanding compared to many other peaks of similar height, but the ascent represents a serious challenge due to the high altitude, changing weather conditions, and the risk of altitude sickness. Although the standard southern route is considered technically less demanding than many other high mountains, Elbrus is known for a large number of accidents. It is estimated that between 15 and 30 people die on the mountain annually, most often due to sudden weather changes, altitude sickness, hypothermia, and loss of orientation.

The most demanding factors of the ascent are associated with altitudes above 5,000 meters, where the reduced amount of oxygen makes physical exertion difficult, as well as sudden weather changes that can lead to strong winds, snowfall, and loss of orientation.

Elbrus is part of the challenge known as the Seven Summits, which is why it is visited every year by mountaineers from different parts of the world.

== Expedition ==
The expedition consisted of a seven-member team of alpinists from Zenica. Among them were members of the Zenica Mountain Rescue Service and the Mountaineering Society "Vedro".

The expedition participants had previous experience in high-altitude mountaineering, including ascents of mountains above 5,000 meters above sea level. Preparations for the expedition lasted several months, and the trip planning and logistics were completed in advance.

The goal of the expedition was to ascend the western peak of Elbrus, which is 5,642 meters high. The final ascent was planned during the night, which is a common practice on high mountains due to more stable temperatures and weather conditions in the early morning hours.

== Course of events ==
The seven-member group began their final ascent on July 24, 2026, without local guides, using the standard southern route towards the western peak of Elbrus. At the beginning of the ascent, weather conditions were favorable. During the night between July 24 and 25, there was a sudden deterioration in the weather, with the emergence of strong winds, snowfall, and dense fog. Data from Russian rescue services indicated that the wind speed during the night increased from approximately 45 km/h to about 70 km/h, accompanied by snowfall and extremely reduced visibility.

At an altitude of over 5,100 meters, visibility became severely limited, causing the group to lose orientation. At the same time, some members developed health problems associated with high altitude and exposure to cold.

The expedition aborted the ascent attempt and began descending toward the lower parts of the mountain. During the descent, two members were no longer capable of moving independently.

One of the mountaineers, Kemal Vidimlić, headed towards the lower parts of the mountain to notify the rescue services, while Haris Adilović remained with the other members of the expedition until help arrived.

== Rescue operation ==
Following the report of the accident, a search and rescue operation was launched in the Elbrus area. The operation involved between 16 and 18 rescuers from the Ministry of Emergency Situations of the Russian Federation (EMERCOM), the Elbrus High-Altitude Rescue Detachment, and other specialized rescue services engaged in the Caucasus region. Due to unfavorable weather conditions, the evacuation of the bodies was temporarily suspended and was completed in multiple phases.

The rescue operation took place in difficult weather conditions. Strong winds, low temperatures, snowfall, and reduced visibility slowed the movement of the rescue teams and hindered access to the area where the expedition was located.

The rescuers first found the two surviving members of the expedition and transported them to a lower altitude, where they were provided with medical assistance.

After that, the search for the other members of the group continued. The bodies of the deceased mountaineers were found in the area of the Elbrus saddle, between the eastern and western peaks of the mountain, at an altitude of approximately 5,350 meters.

Due to the high risk to the rescuers and unfavorable weather conditions, the extraction of the bodies was carried out in several stages. After the operation was completed, the bodies were brought down to the foot of the mountain and handed over to the competent authorities for identification and further procedures.

During the same rescue operation, the body of a Russian mountaineer who died in a separate incident on Elbrus and was not connected to the expedition from Bosnia and Herzegovina was also evacuated.

== Investigation ==
The regional branch of the Investigative Committee of the Russian Federation for the Kabardino-Balkarian Republic launched an investigation to determine the circumstances of the accident.

The investigation included an examination of the scene, an analysis of weather conditions, the collection of statements from the surviving members of the expedition and rescue personnel, as well as a review of communication between the expedition participants and the services involved in the rescue operation.

According to preliminary findings, the accident was linked to a combination of multiple factors, including a sudden change in weather conditions, loss of visibility, difficulty in orientation, and the physical consequences of being at a high altitude.

On August 6, 2026, representatives of the Ministry of Emergency Situations of the Russian Federation and the Russian Mountaineering Federation presented preliminary assessments regarding the possible causes of the accident at a joint briefing in Nalchik. According to their statements, the tragedy was most likely contributed to by extremely unfavorable weather conditions, a sudden drop in atmospheric pressure, very low temperatures, possible disorientation of the group, and inadequate preparation for the conditions on Elbrus, which had been suspected earlier. At the same time, it was emphasized that the official investigation had not yet been concluded.

== Victims and survivors ==
Five members of the expedition from Bosnia and Herzegovina died in the accident:

- Alma Okanović
- Denis Okanović
- Dr. Meliha Čaušević
- Nermin Talam
- Almir Krivdić

Among the deceased were members of the Zenica Mountain Rescue Service and the Mountaineering Society "Vedro".

Haris Adilović and Kemal Vidimlić survived the accident. After being rescued, they received medical care for the effects of exposure to low temperatures and high-altitude conditions.

== Expedition from Herzegovina ==
At the time of the accident, another expedition from Bosnia and Herzegovina was also in the Caucasus region, consisting of alpinists from Gacko, Bileća, and Trebinje.

The goal of this expedition was to ascend Kazbek and Elbrus. Members of the two Bosnian-Herzegovinian groups met on July 24, 2026, in the Elbrus area, where they discussed the conditions on the mountain and their plans for the final ascent.

The Herzegovinian expedition began its ascent attempt the same night but decided to abort the climb at an altitude of approximately 5,400 meters due to deteriorating weather conditions, strong winds, and reduced visibility.

Upon returning to the base camp, the members of the expedition did not immediately have information about the status of the Zenica group. They learned about the accident after establishing contact with other participants and the rescue services.

Their testimonies were used in the reconstruction of the weather conditions prevailing on the mountain at the time of the accident.

== Reactions ==
The government and other institutions of Bosnia and Herzegovina, as well as local authorities in Zenica, issued statements regarding the accident and expressed their condolences to the families of the deceased.

Following the accident, the Ministry of Foreign Affairs of Bosnia and Herzegovina, through the Embassy in the Russian Federation, and with the support of the City of Zenica and federal authorities, coordinated activities with Russian institutions and the Zenica Mountain Rescue Service.

The embassy's activities involved providing consular assistance to the surviving members of the expedition, identifying the deceased, and organizing the transport of the remains to Bosnia and Herzegovina.

Mountaineering organizations from Bosnia and Herzegovina and the region also issued statements reflecting on the accident and thanking the Russian rescue services that participated in the operation.

== See also ==
- List of mountaineering disasters by death toll
