= Dachstein hiking disaster =

1954 hiking deaths in Austria

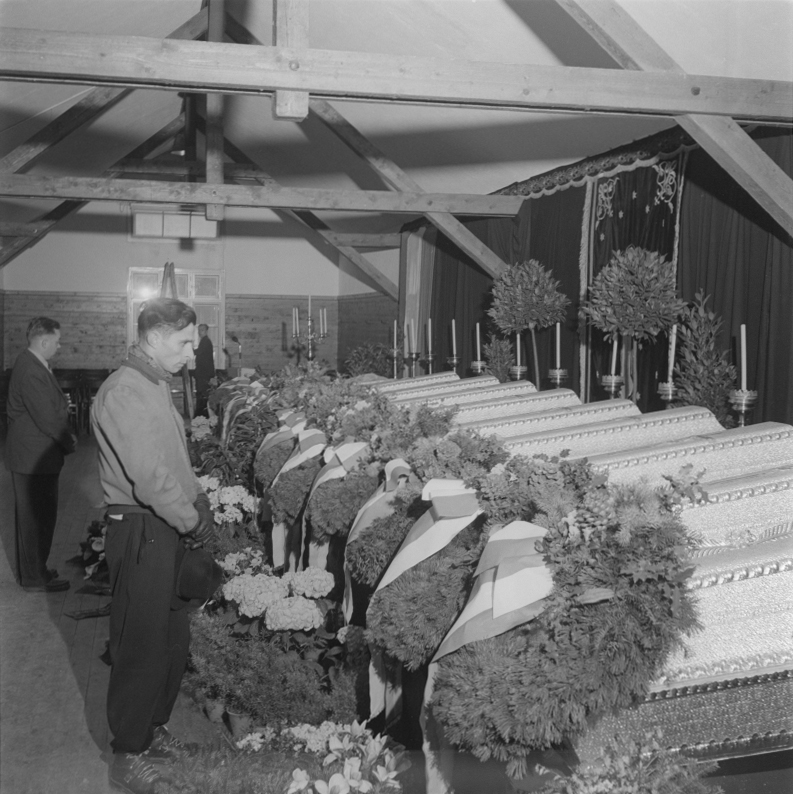
Coffins of the victims of the Dachstein hiking disaster in a sports hall in Obertraun

In April 1954, 13 people from Heilbronn, ten students and three teachers, died in a blizzard while hiking the Dachstein Mountains in Upper Austria.

== Expedition ==
On April 15, 1954, during the Easter holiday, a group of ten students and four teachers led by 40-year-old Hans Seiler, a teacher described as having past mountaineering experience, set off on a hiking trip to Hoher Dachstein. Although the weather was "typical of an Austrian spring", there had been forecasted reports of snow and fog. Despite being warned by locals of these forecasts, Seiler brushed them off, and the group left for the trip in the morning. The only survivor of the group, teacher Hildegard Mattes, turned around after two hours. After failing to return, the group was reported as missing, and rescue efforts were initiated in the following days. The bodies of eight students and three teachers were found on April 24.

The victims are:

- Willi Alfred Dengler, 16 years old, student
- Herbert Adolf Kurz, 15 years old, student
- Peter Lehnen, 15 years old, student
- Peter Eberhard Mössner, 16 years old, student
- Rolf Richard Mössner, 14 years old, student
- Roland Georg Josef Rauschmaier, 15 years old, student
- Karl-Heinz Rienecker, 16 years old, student
- Hans Werner Rupp, 24 years old, teacher
- Hans Georg Seiler, 40 years old, teacher (in some sources spelled: Sailer)
- Kurt Seitz, 14 years old, student
- Dieter Steck, 16 years old, student
- Klaus Josef Strobel, 15 years old, student
- Christa Doris Vollmer, 24 years old, teacher

Photographs of the group during their expedition had been taken by one of the students, 16-year-old Dieter Steck, whose camera was found by his body.

== See also ==
- English calamity
- List of mountaineering disasters by death toll
