= 1968 Biały Jar avalanche =

Avalanche in Poland

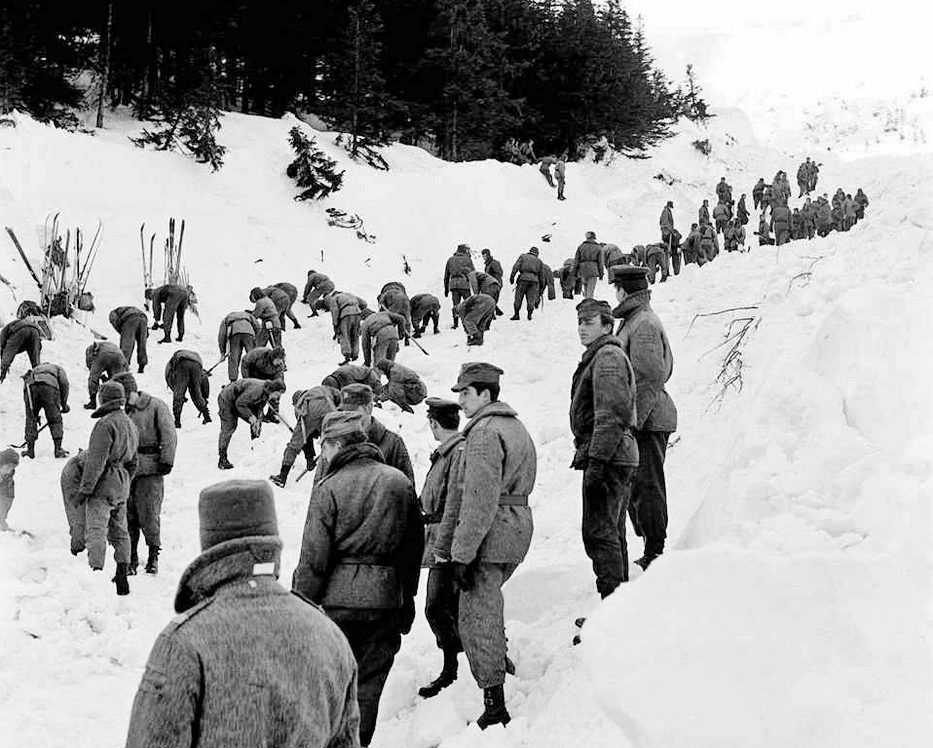
- Rescue operation after the avalanche in Biały Jar
- Date: March 20, 1968
- Time: 11:00 AM (CET)
- Location: Biały Jar Poland
- Type: avalanche
- Deaths: 19
- Injuries: 5

The avalanche in Biały Jar occurred on 20 March 1968, sweeping away 24 people who were walking along the bottom of Biały Jar in the Giant Mountains. Five of them, who were thrown aside by the avalanche, managed to survive. The remaining 19 people – including 13 Russians, 4 citizens of East Germany, and two Polish citizens – lost their lives.

The rescue operation was conducted by the Polish Mountain Volunteer Search and Rescue, Czech rescuers, and volunteers. A total of 1,100 people took part in the operation. The last bodies of the victims were found only on 1 and 5 April.

== Origins and course ==
The weather conditions during the first decade of March were relatively stable – no winds, high levels of sunshine, and temperatures around zero degrees. All of this contributed to the melting of a not very thick snow layer. The water from the melting snow seeped into the thick layer of ground (disintegrated granite rubble and some larger blocks). Additionally, the ground was soaked by the crevasse springs of Biały Jar. The second decade of March began with heavy snowfall and a drop in temperature below zero, as well as snowstorms. On March 13, brief clearings were recorded. The snow, previously saturated with water, became cemented, and large amounts of fresh, wet snow fell on top, followed by another layer of dry snow. This last layer had a varied density.

Further snowfall and snowstorms caused significant snow overload on slopes with relatively steep inclines. The balance of the snow cover was disturbed, resulting in a small avalanche (so-called "slab avalanche") on March 17. The snowfall and snowstorms mainly occurred at night, while during the day there were clearings and strong solar heating. This caused the upper layers of snow to melt, and the resulting water seeped deeper. The frozen rubble-ice ground did not undergo these changes. At midday on March 20, under significant sunshine, large masses of snow detached rapidly in the valley. They slid down the frozen ground at high speed.

== Avalanche ==
On March 20, the weather was encouraging for hiking. However, due to the closure of the chairlift to Kopa mountain, tourists decided to take the «black trail» along Biały Jar. They ignored avalanche warning signs and also disregarded warnings in the guesthouses, whose managers had been notified by the Mountain Volunteer Search and Rescue after a similar avalanche occurred three days earlier.

Among the people on the avalanche path were 13 Russians – young teachers from Kuybyshev, 4 Germans, and 2 Poles. Shortly before the avalanche struck, several Polish families with children turned back due to exhaustion and returned to the "Hanka" guesthouse, with only three individuals continuing forward. The avalanche caught the tourists at a crossroads as they debated whether to head toward Strzecha Akademicka or the upper station of the lift to Mała Kopa.

The avalanche occurred at 11:10 AM, although some sources suggest it happened before 11:00 AM. The avalanche boulder tongue was over 600 meters long (some sources state 800 meters or nearly a kilometer), between 20 and 80 meters wide, with a thickness of approximately 12 meters and a front height of between 20 and 25 meters. The mass of snow weighed 50,000 tons. The avalanche's travel time was 48 seconds, and its speed is estimated to have reached 100 km/h or even higher.

== Rescue operation ==
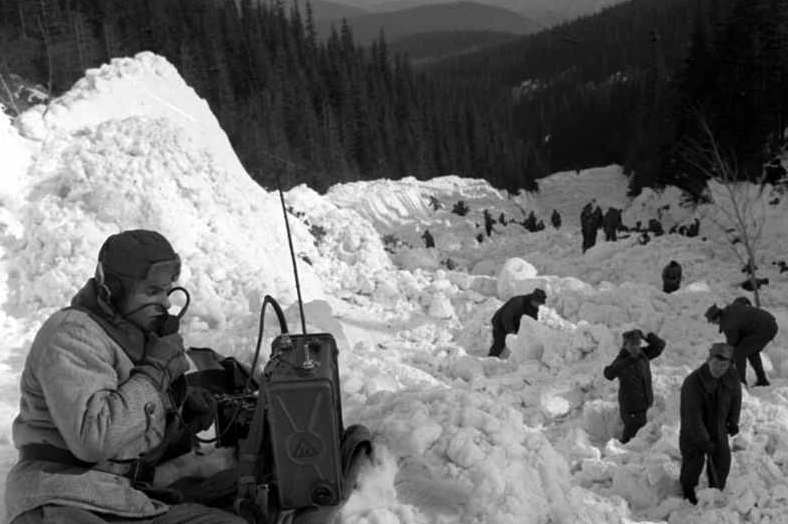
Rescue operation

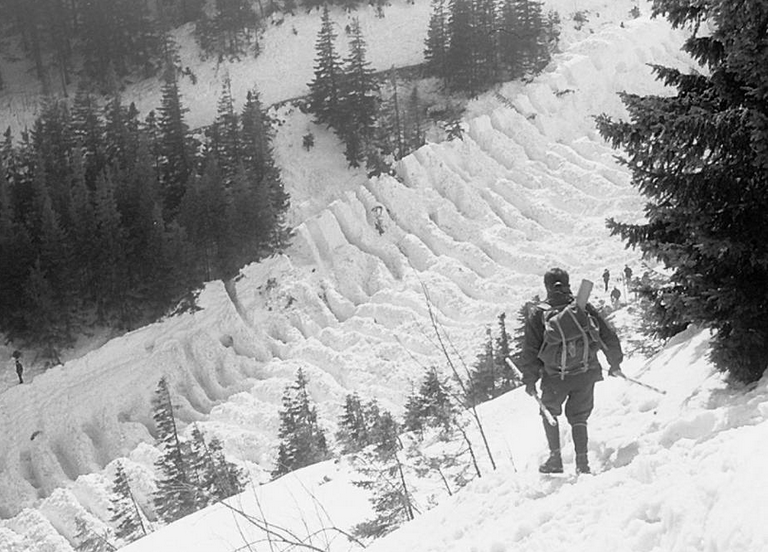
Avalanche boulder tongue after the rescue operation

The first to notice the avalanche were athletes who were running just behind the Soviet-East German group. They began searching for the victims right away. The official rescue operation started around 11:15 AM. Five tourists, who had been blown off the avalanche path by the gust of wind, were transported to the hospital – two Germans, two Poles, and one Russian. These were the only survivors of the catastrophe.

A rescue team from Czechoslovakia arrived with a dog trained to search for avalanche victims. One of the Czech rescuers had been rescued from a similar avalanche by Polish Mountain Volunteer Search and Rescue members two years earlier. The Czech team entered the Polish side under the responsibility of the commander of the Border Protection Forces post "Nad Śnieżką". The first avalanche victims were located by the Czech dog. The rescuers followed, using probes, and then followed with shovels to dig through the areas marked by black flags. The extracted victims were first transported to a military tent and then to a morgue. Due to a lack of toboggans, the bodies were carried on skis tied together with a rope.

The search continued into the late evening, despite the threat of another avalanche. There were plans to trigger an avalanche by shooting, but these were abandoned when the Czech shelter was nearly damaged. According to other sources, the projectiles got stuck in the snow. Over the next two days, six more bodies were recovered. The final bodies were retrieved on April 1 and 5. Most victims died from injuries, with a few succumbing to suffocation. More than 1,100 people participated in the search operation.

Diplomatic representatives from the Soviet Union and East Germany arrived at the disaster site. The Soviet consul general accused the Polish authorities of intentionally causing the avalanche.

== Consequences ==
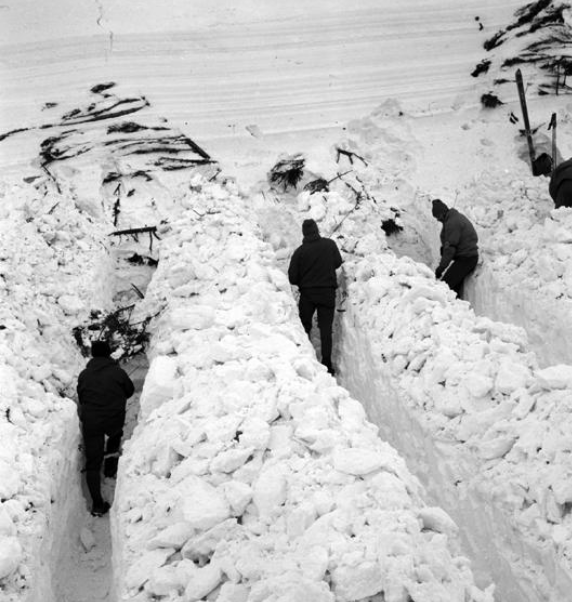
Search of the avalanche boulder tongue

After the avalanche, in several places within the basin, the edges of the rubble covers retreated by between 2 and 3 meters. However, the vegetation in Biały Jar was relatively unaffected. Some rowan shrubs were broken, a few patches of sod measuring 250 × 50 cm were displaced about three meters downward, and a few young birches and rowan trees in the lower part of the ravine were damaged.

After the rescue operation, the Mountain Volunteer Search and Rescue management provided additional equipment to the Giant Mountains rescue team. Following the disaster, rumors spread that Stasi and KGB agents had died in Biały Jar while searching for a tunnel where Nazi gold was allegedly hidden. These rumors were never confirmed, despite interest from Polish intelligence.

== Commemoration ==
Shortly after the event, an information plaque was placed at the site, and later a monument made of granite blocks was erected. This monument was destroyed by another avalanche in 1974. On 10 August 2018, during the celebrations of the Mountaineers' Day, a new monument was unveiled in Biały Jar. One of the granite blocks from the previous monument was used in its construction.
