= 2022 Uttarakhand avalanche =

Worst recorded mountaineering disaster in India

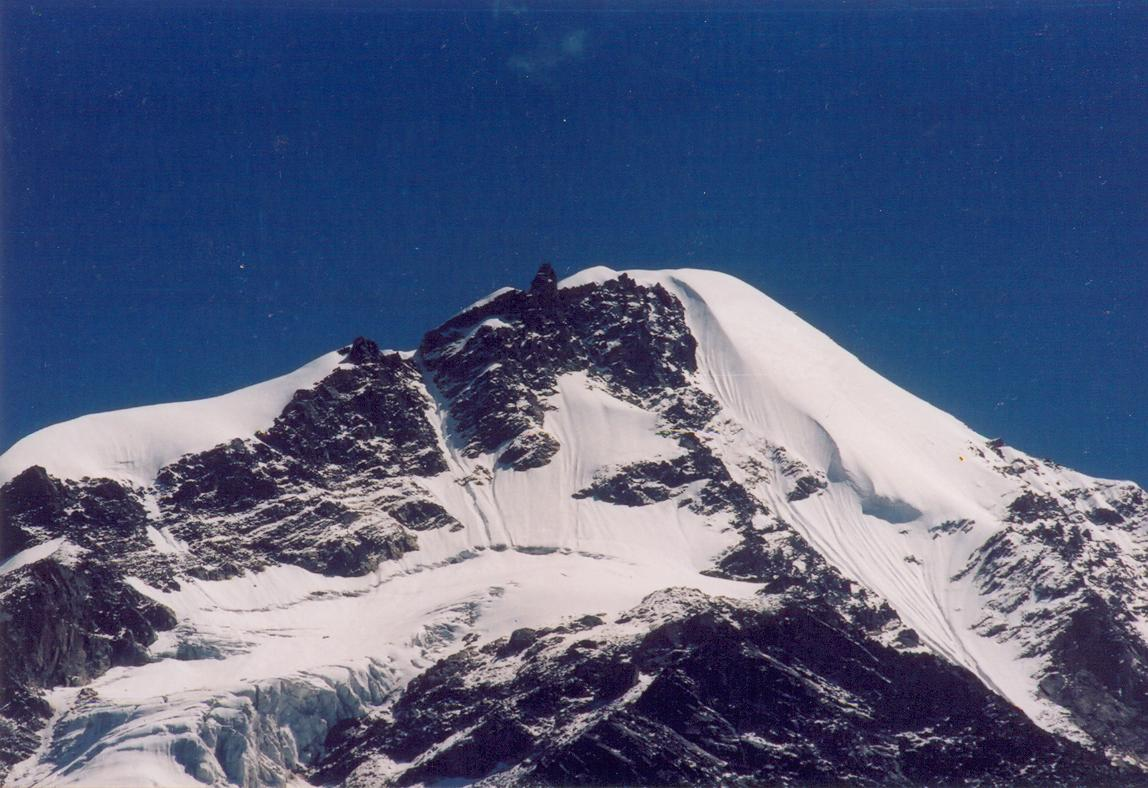
- Date: 4 October 2022
- Location: Uttarakhand, India
- Deaths: 27

On 4 October 2022, an avalanche at the Draupadi Ka Danda peak in Uttarakhand, India killed 27 mountaineers in the Advanced Mountaineering Course of the Nehru Institute of Mountaineering (NIM). The death toll makes this the worst mountaineering disaster recorded in India. 24 of the bodies were of trainee mountaineers and 2 were of their instructors. As of 7 March 2024, one mountaineer is still missing.

In 2022, the Indian subcontinent experienced a prolonged southwest monsoon season with above average precipitation. As a result, the snowfall accumulation in the Himalayas was significant during the standard autumn season for climbing. This contributed to the slab avalanche that released a few hundred meters below the summit, sweeping the climbing party into a crevasse.

Mountaineers at the Nehru Institute of Mountaineering announced that they will climb 11 previously unclimbed mountain peaks as a tribute to the victims of the avalanche.

== See also ==
- List of mountaineering disasters by death toll
