= 2018 accident in the Valais Alps =

Mountain disaster in Swiss Alps (2018)

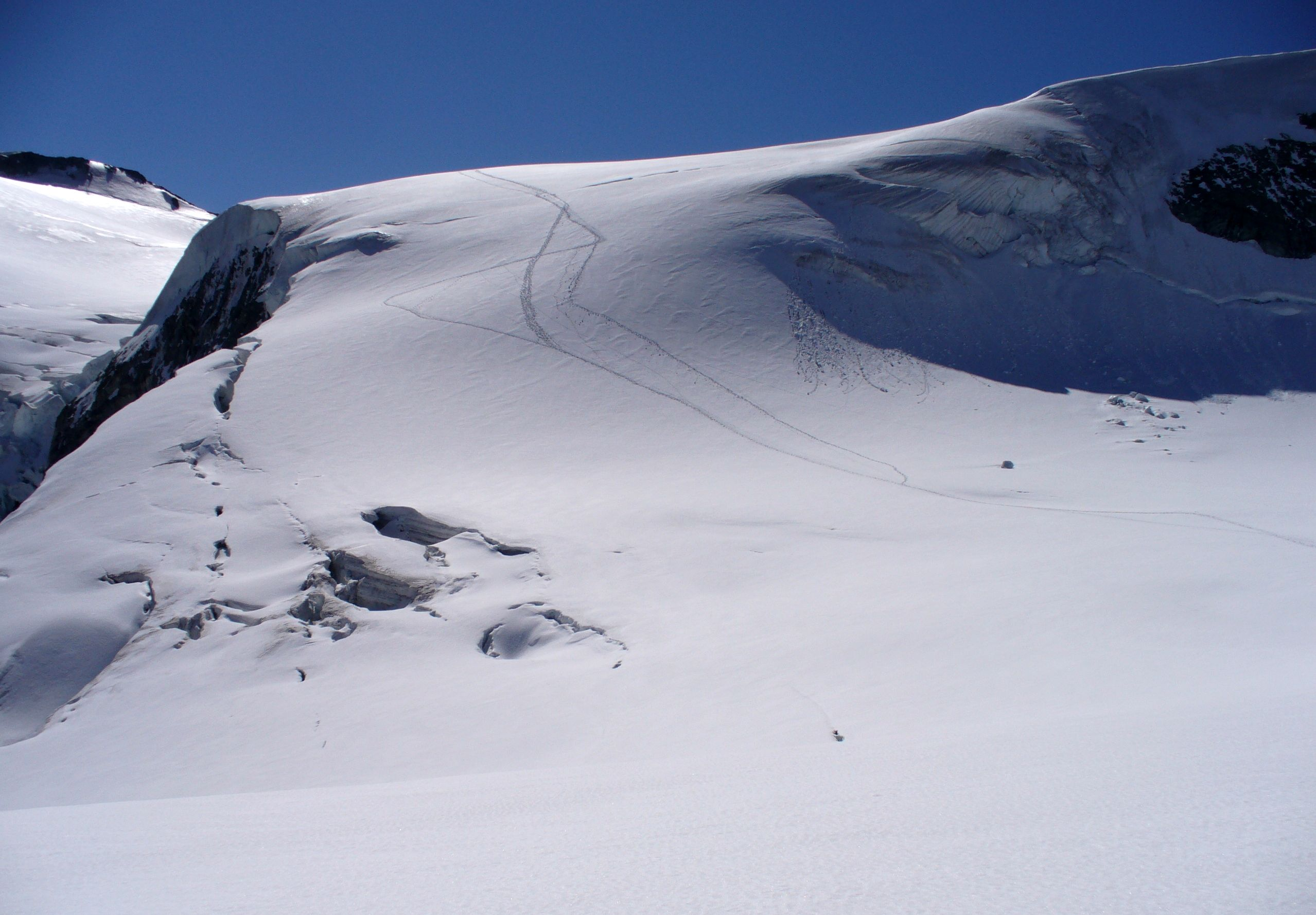
Route La Serpentine, seen from the Col du Tsijiore Nouve (approx. 3450 m) to the Col du Brenay (3615 m). The Pigne d'Arolla is partially visible on the left edge of the image.

The Drama of the Valais Alps is a mountain accident that took place in the Valais Alps on 29 April 2018. A group of ski tourers attempting the Haute Route between Chamonix and Zermatt perished due to hypothermia.

== Expedition ==
A mountain guide and nine of his clients were trying to reach Zermatt from Chamonix on the slopes of the Pigne d'Arolla in the Val d'Hérens on 29 April 2018. It was on the fourth day of a planned six day expedition. The group had originally planned to stay that night at Nacamuli hut, but, due to poor weather forecasts, changed their plan to ski to Vignettes hut instead, which was only a short ski descent from Pigne d'Arolla.

The group successfully summited Pigne d'Arolla by midday. However, because of poor weather and limited visibility, the group descended in crampons rather than on skis, in whiteout conditions. An additional four lost French skiers had joined the group during the whiteout, as well. Descending on crampons considerably slowed their descent, and night began to fall and the party had still not reached Vignettes hut. By this point, the group wanted to call for help, but the satellite phone did not have power. The group was forced to dig in for the night, with only space blankets for shelter and without any food or water, in very cold temperatures and high winds. The group was not rescued until the next morning.

== Aftermath ==
Seven people died of hypothermia and exhaustion. The last to die was a 42-year-old woman, Francesca Von Felten, from Parma, who died in the Valais hospital to which she had been airlifted. In all, a total of 16 people died in the Alps that weekend during the storm.

In an editorial, Swiss meteorologist Jörg Kachelmann wrote that the weather forecast from three days before (April 26th) correctly predicted the time when the Foehn wind would end. In the Alps, the end of the Foehn is a sure sign of significant weather worsening. Likewise, the forecast from April 28th correctly predicted the gradually worsening weather – lowering temperatures, increasing wind, and snowfall during the late evening. Thus, the accident was mainly caused by poor decision-making and leadership.

Several other causes may have contributed to the disaster. The guide's mobile phone (with a GPS map) malfunctioned during the whiteout. The nearby Vignettes hut was not aware that the group was approaching, as the guide had booked an overnight stay at the Italian Nacamuli hut further away. The group may have been too large for one guide. When the group decided to call for help, the satellite phone was out of batteries.

== See also ==
- List of mountaineering disasters by death toll
