= 2003 Tatra Mountains avalanche =

Avalanche in the Tatra Mountains

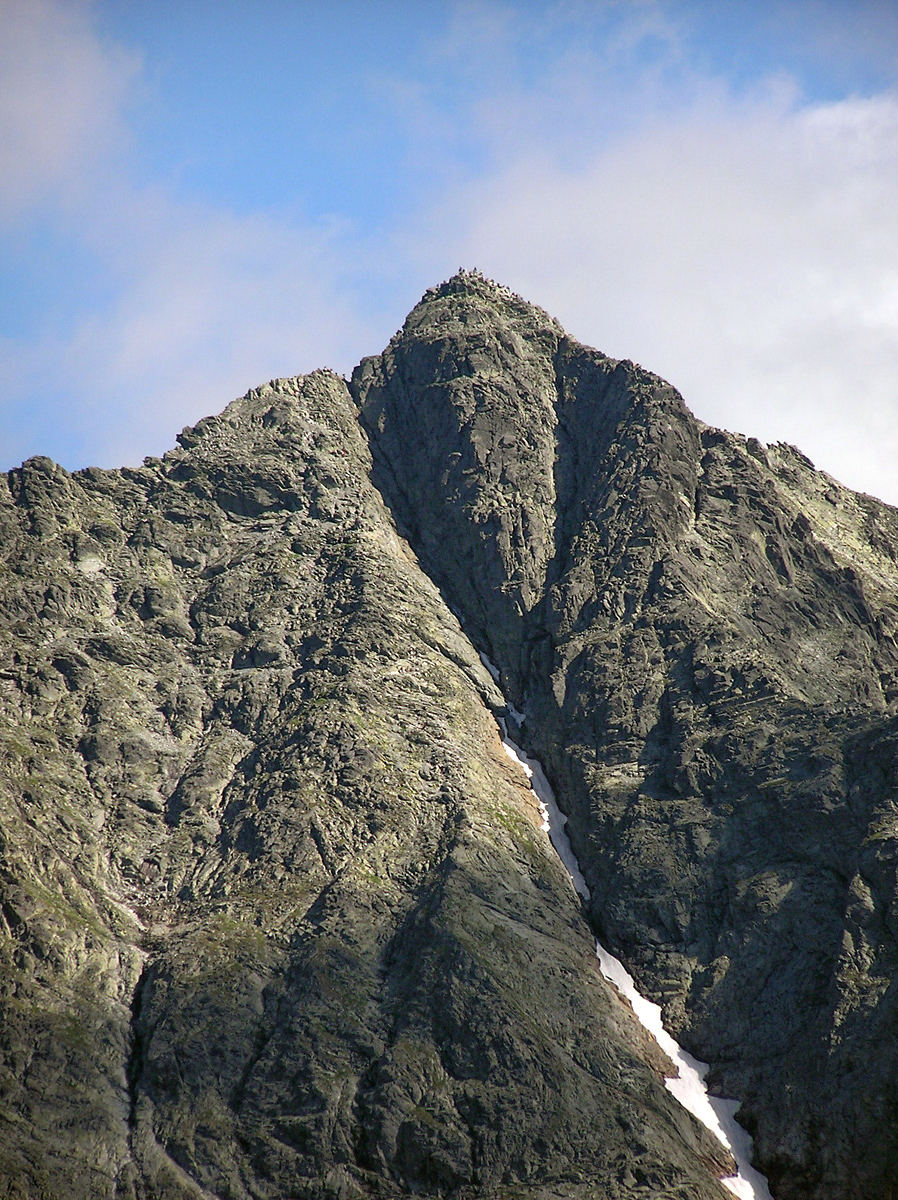
- Rysy peak

- Location on the map of the Tatra Mountains
- Date: January 28, 2003
- Time: 10:45 AM (CET)
- Location: ascent of Rysy, Poland; 49°10′46″N 20°5′18″E
- Type: avalanche
- Deaths: 8 people
- Injuries: 2 people

The 2003 Tatra Mountains avalanche was an avalanche that occurred on 28 January 2003, sweeping away nine out of a thirteen-member group heading to the summit of Rysy in the Tatra Mountains. The participants of the trip were students from the Leon Kruczkowski High School in Tychy and individuals associated with the school's sports club Pion.

On 28 October 2010, the film Cisza premiered, based on the events of 2003.

== Avalanche ==
A group of youths consisting of 20 high school students and one 22-year-old student from Tychy arrived at the mountain hut at Morskie Oko on 27 January 2003. The organizer and guide of the tragically ended expedition, as well as one of the two group supervisors, was Mirosław Szumny, a geography teacher and head of the school's sports club Pion, who had previously taken students on mountain trips multiple times but did not have formal qualifications to lead them. At the mountain hut, Szumny spoke with the Tatra Volunteer Search and Rescue worker Władysław Cywiński, who – as stated in a letter to Michał Jagiełło in 2005 – strongly advised against climbing Rysy, suggested hiring a mountain guide, warned that the youths were not prepared for such a climb, and the groups were too numerous, but he failed to convince Mirosław Szumny. The first part of the group climbed Rysy without any problems on January 27, and the second part was supposed to reach the summit the next day. On the same day, members of the first group, in a conversation with a member of the Tatra Volunteer Search and Rescue avalanche commission, Lesław Riemen, reported that the snow layer was approximately ankle-deep.

During the night, the weather conditions changed: there was a warming and rain. The avalanche risk level was the second (moderate) on a five-point scale. Nevertheless, Mirosław Szumny, along with the second supervisor, Tomasz Zbiegien, and the second part of the group (total of 13 people: 10 high school students, a university student – the brother of one of the high school students, and two supervisors) set out for the summit. They left the mountain hut at 6:30 AM.

An avalanche towards Czarny Staw descended around 11:00 AM from Rysy, almost from the very top. At the moment when it hit the group, they were divided: three people were in the front, and two smaller groups were in the back. The size of the avalanche is estimated at 13 hectares, the length of the movement track at over 1200 meters, and the mass of the falling snow at 26,000 tons (this was the amount remaining on the surface; according to experts, much more snow was pushed into the lake), and the avalanche's front had several meters in height. The impact was so strong that it cracked the ice cover on a large part of the lake's surface, even at a distance of over 200 meters from the shore, despite it having a thickness ranging from 70 to 100 centimeters. Four people, including Mirosław Szumny, found themselves above the avalanche's edge, which prevented them from being injured.

== Causes of the avalanche ==
Expert topoclimatologists investigating the causes of the avalanche determined that the avalanche was triggered by a series of natural factors "with the possibility of secondary influence of human interference". Scientists did not conclude whether the behavior of the excursion participants could have contributed to the avalanche. The court acknowledged the competence of the scientists and accepted that the avalanche occurred spontaneously.

According to the analysis by Dr. Mieczysław Sobik from the University of Wrocław, the cause of the avalanche was the atmospheric conditions in the months leading up to the disaster. Alternating temperature drops and warm-ups led to the formation of ice crusts, significantly hindering the bonding of new snow layers with existing ones. Additionally, the weather conditions contributed to the formation of cup-shaped snow layers, which enable the occurrence of a "slab" avalanche. The immediate cause of the avalanche was the last snowfall, with the warming that occurred the day before the avalanche having no significance. The avalanche occurred in two stages: the first stage was the descent from Kocioł pod Rysami, which in the second stage merged with the snow from the Rysa couloir.

== Rescue operation ==
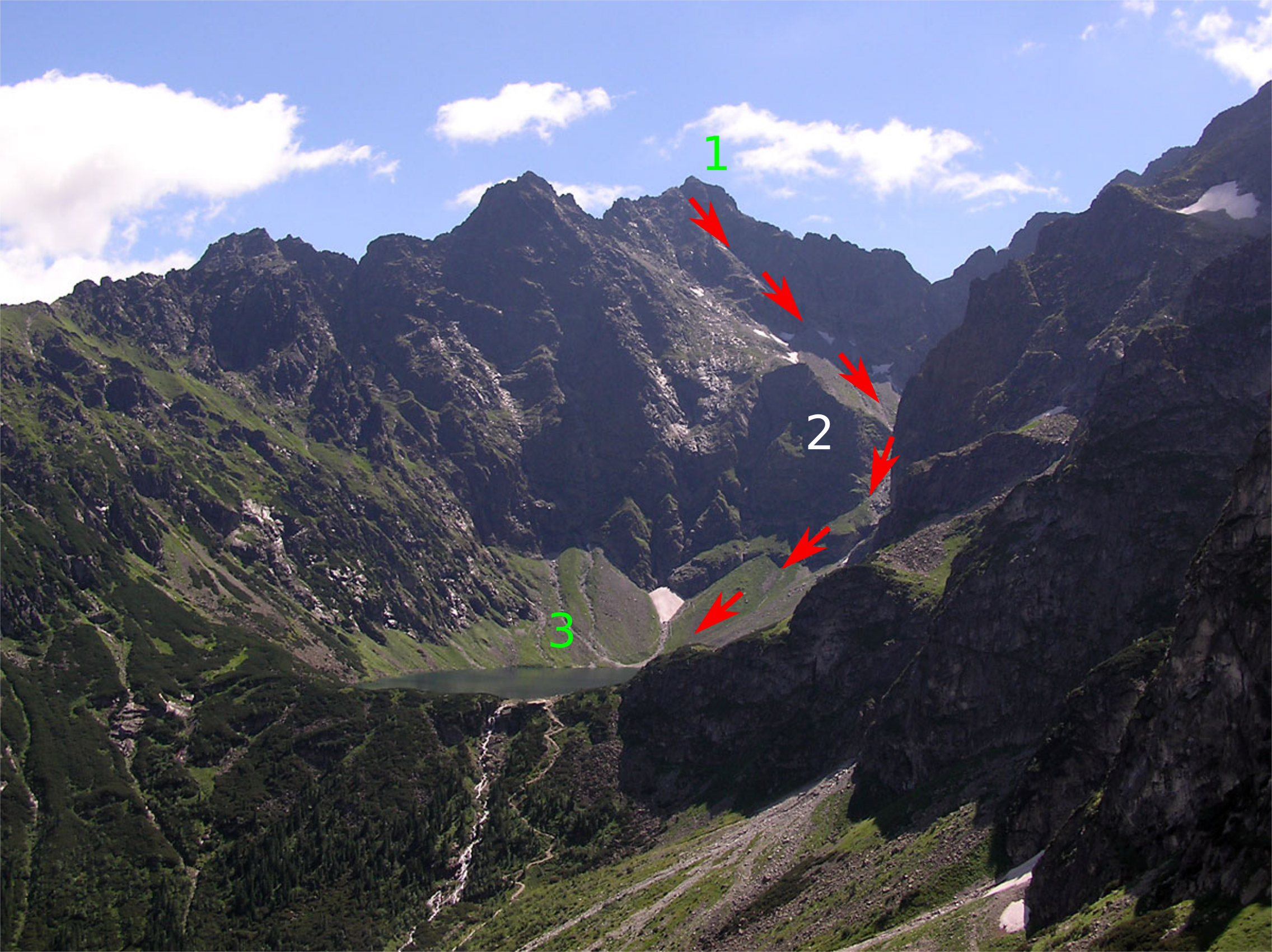
The path of the avalanche in 2003 (1. Rysy, 2. Bula pod Rysami, 3. Czarny Staw)

Assistance was immediately summoned after the accident by a random tourist who found himself in the immediate vicinity of the avalanche but outside its range. The expedition was personally led by Jan Krzysztof, the head of the rescue service. A group of rescuers from the Tatra Volunteer Search and Rescue found one person at the beginning, partially buried under the snow, a girl named Luiza, who had a broken arm and general bruises. Rescuers only realized the extent of the tragedy when a teacher arrived at the scene. After some time, two more people were rescued. Rescuer Grzegorz Bargiel found under a meter of snow one of the excursion participants, Przemysław, who was already without breath and pulse. After resuscitation, he was transported by helicopter to the hospital, but after 72 days, he died in the hospital. A pedagogue helping the rescuers at the avalanche site found another of his students, Łukasz, who was deceased.

During the day, 36 Tatra Volunteer Search and Rescue rescuers worked at the avalanche site, including two doctors and six avalanche dog handlers, as well as fifteen or seventeen trained employees of the Tatra National Park, including the director of the Tatra National Park, Paweł Skawiński. In the evening of the day of the avalanche, the search was suspended due to bad weather conditions. In particular, rescuers did not consider it possible to search the area around Czarny Staw. At this point, many of them were convinced that the remaining victims were buried under its ice (this is the opinion expressed by Adam Marasek, one of the most experienced rescuers, among others); this assumption later proved to be fully correct.

The next day, at 6:00 AM, the search was resumed despite the third level of avalanche danger. On the same day, there was a malfunction of the Sokół helicopter, during which both helicopter engines were successively shut down. The crew managed to jump out of the aircraft (from a height of several meters) when the first engine stopped, and its members suffered only minor injuries. During the attempt to return to the landing site, the second engine also failed. Henryk Serda landed autorotationally in the village of Murzasichle, but during the touchdown, the helicopter suffered serious damage (the tail beam was broken). Further searches, also conducted with the help of Slovak rescuers, did not bring any results. Dogs with sensitive noses indicated places on the lake, but conducting searches there in winter was impossible.

Upon receiving news of the tragedy in the Tatra Mountains, a crisis management team was established at the City Hall of Tychy by order of the Mayor of Tychy, Andrzej Dziuba. On the same evening, families of the avalanche victims traveled from Tychy to Zakopane. The next day, mourning was declared in Silesia. The remaining six bodies, pushed under the ice of Czarny Staw, were only found in the spring, after the thaw; one of them was retrieved from a depth of 26 meters. The last victim was found on June 17. In total, Tatra Volunteer Search and Rescue organized 14 search expeditions, involving 260 rescuers, 36 avalanche dogs, and the rescuers worked for 2,203 hours.

== Case of the helicopter ==
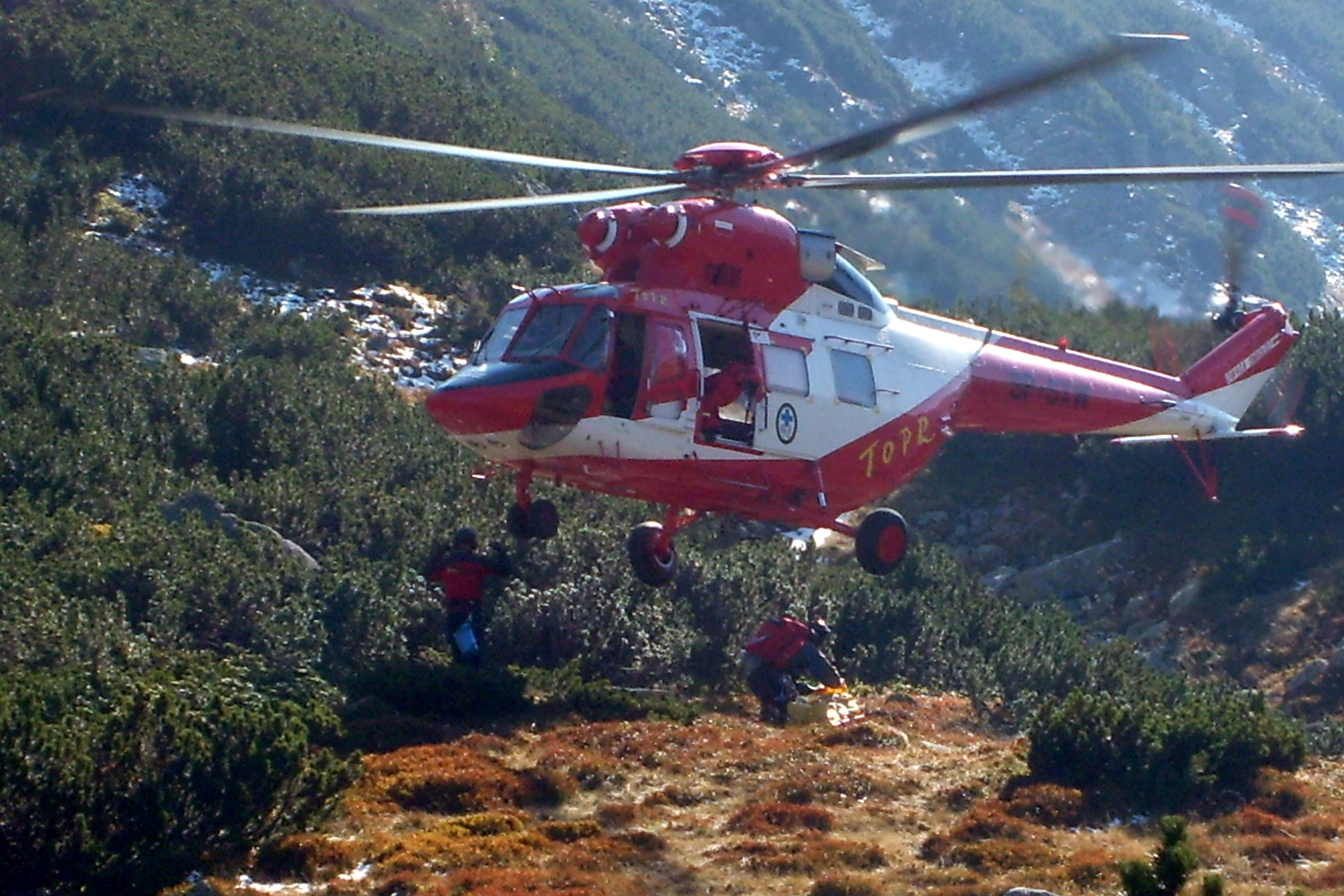
Sokół helicopter of the Tatra Volunteer Search and Rescue

The management of the Air Ambulance Service accused pilot Henryk Serda of violating procedures and dismissed him from work, but not specifically due to any allegation related to the accident at Czarny Staw; one of the accusations was insubordination. Serda defended himself by claiming that the dismissal was retaliation for criticizing the organization. The pilot appealed to the labor court, and in 2005, he was reinstated to work in the Air Ambulance Service. At the same time, the prosecutor's office charged him with unintentionally causing the accident due to failure to activate the engine anti-icing system, as suggested by the investigation conducted by the Main Commission for the Investigation of Aviation Accidents. Serda defended himself by maintaining that he had activated the system, and if it did not work, it could have been the fault of the helicopter's owner – the Air Ambulance Service, which did not properly maintain the equipment. Ultimately, he was acquitted of the charge; the court allowed that the accident could have been caused by snow entering the engine.

== Trials ==
In February 2004, a criminal trial regarding the tragic death of high school students, a university student, and a group leader began before the District Court in Katowice. Mirosław Szumny, a geography teacher and organizer of the tragic trip, was accused. The prosecution, based on the expert opinion, alleged that the accused committed numerous errors: the group was too large, the participants were walking too close to each other, the group was poorly equipped, the youths were not adequately prepared, as it was the first winter trip to the Tatra Mountains for most of them, and above all, that he did not consider the deteriorating weather conditions. As a result of this trial, the court sentenced the teacher for unintentionally causing danger and imposed a one-year suspended prison sentence for three years. In the verdict announced on 22 March 2005, the court accepted that the avalanche occurred spontaneously. At the same time, it recognized that the suspect did not have the qualifications to lead the group and, contrary to the Tatra Volunteer Search and Rescue's suggestions, did not hire a mountain guide. The court dismissed the charge of organizing the trip the previous day (January 27), as it deemed that although the teacher exposed the participants to danger, prosecution should proceed from a private complaint, which was not filed. The court noted that it applied a suspended sentence because the teacher had no prior convictions and enjoyed an impeccable reputation. The prosecutor appealed the verdict.

During the second trial, Mirosław Szumny admitted to making mistakes in organizing the trip, stating that when going to the mountains with the youths, he was aware that an avalanche could occur and that there was no weather that would provide a sense of security. On 11 April 2006, he was sentenced to two years in prison, suspended for four years. The Katowice Court of Appeal ruled that the accident occurred due to the unintentional fault of the teacher.

In 2016, Andrzej Matyśkiewicz, whose two sons died in the avalanche, filed a civil lawsuit against the City Hall of Tychy, the teacher-organizer of the trip, and the school sports club for compensation of 700,000 PLN with interest. In 2018, the District Court in Katowice ruled, in a non-binding manner, that the teacher and the club must pay 140,000 PLN in compensation. The court explained that the city's civil liability had expired. Both the plaintiff and the defendant teacher appealed the verdict. In February 2019, the Katowice Court of Appeal upheld the amount of compensation awarded to the deceased boys' father by the District Court, dismissing the appeals filed by him and the teacher. At the same time, the proceedings regarding the sports club were suspended. After the verdict became final, at the initiative of internet users from Tychy, two graduates of the Leon Kruczkowski High School organized a fundraiser on the zrzutka.pl platform, aiming to raise funds to pay the awarded compensation. The full amount was successfully raised.

== Fatalities ==
- Przemysław Kwiecień (18 years old) – found on January 28;
- Szymon Lenartowicz (17 years old) – found on May 13;
- Andrzej Matyśkiewicz (16 years old) – found on June 7;
- Łukasz Matyśkiewicz (22 years old) – found on January 28;
- Justyna Narloch (16 years old) – found on June 17;
- Ewa Pacanowska (17 years old) – found on June 7;
- Artur Rygulski (18 years old) – found on June 5;
- Tomasz Zbiegień (36 years old) – found on June 8.

Przemysław Kwiecień died in the hospital ten weeks after the accident.
