= Mountain Volunteer Search and Rescue =

Polish mountain rescue organization

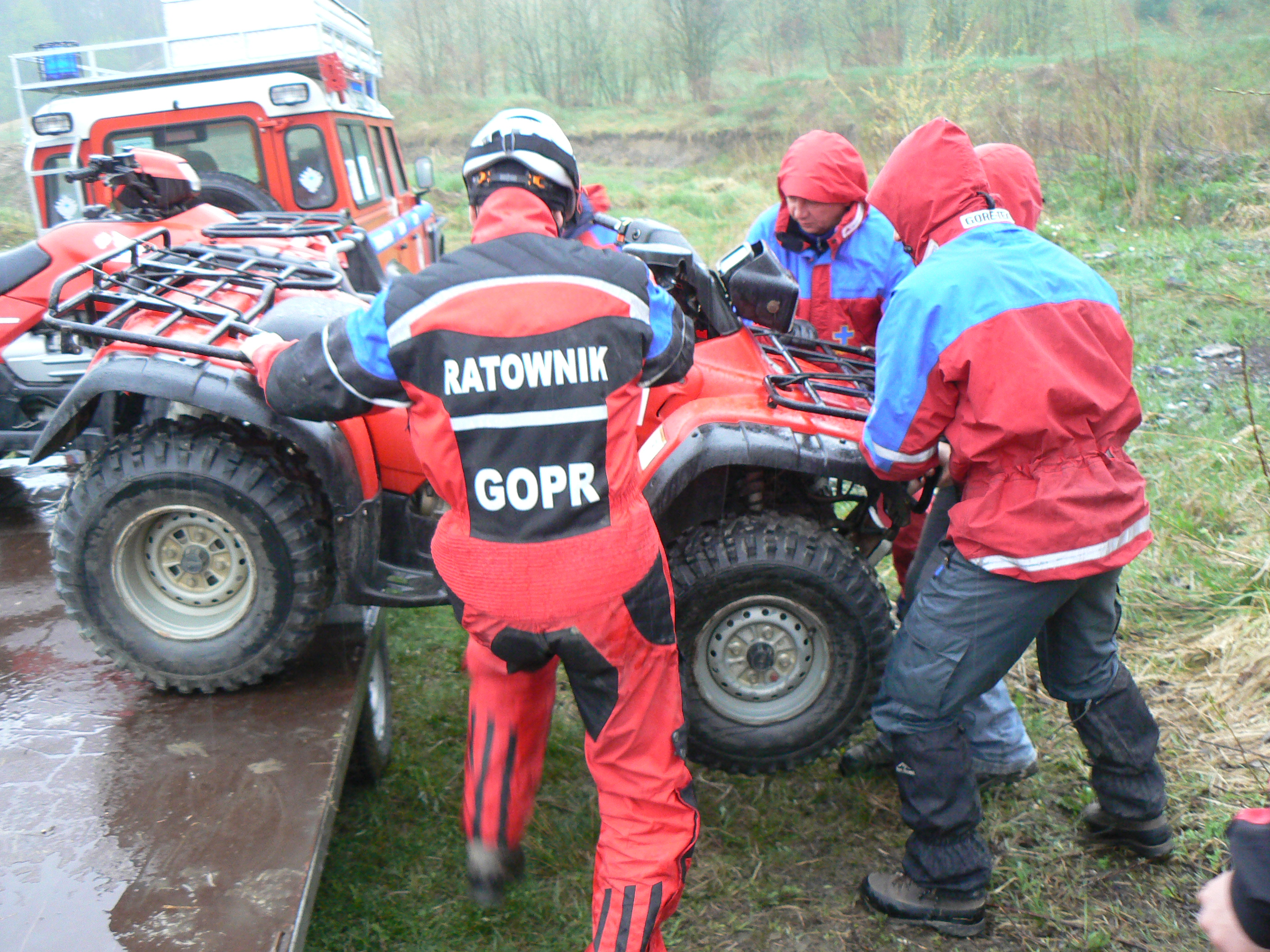
Rescue service training course

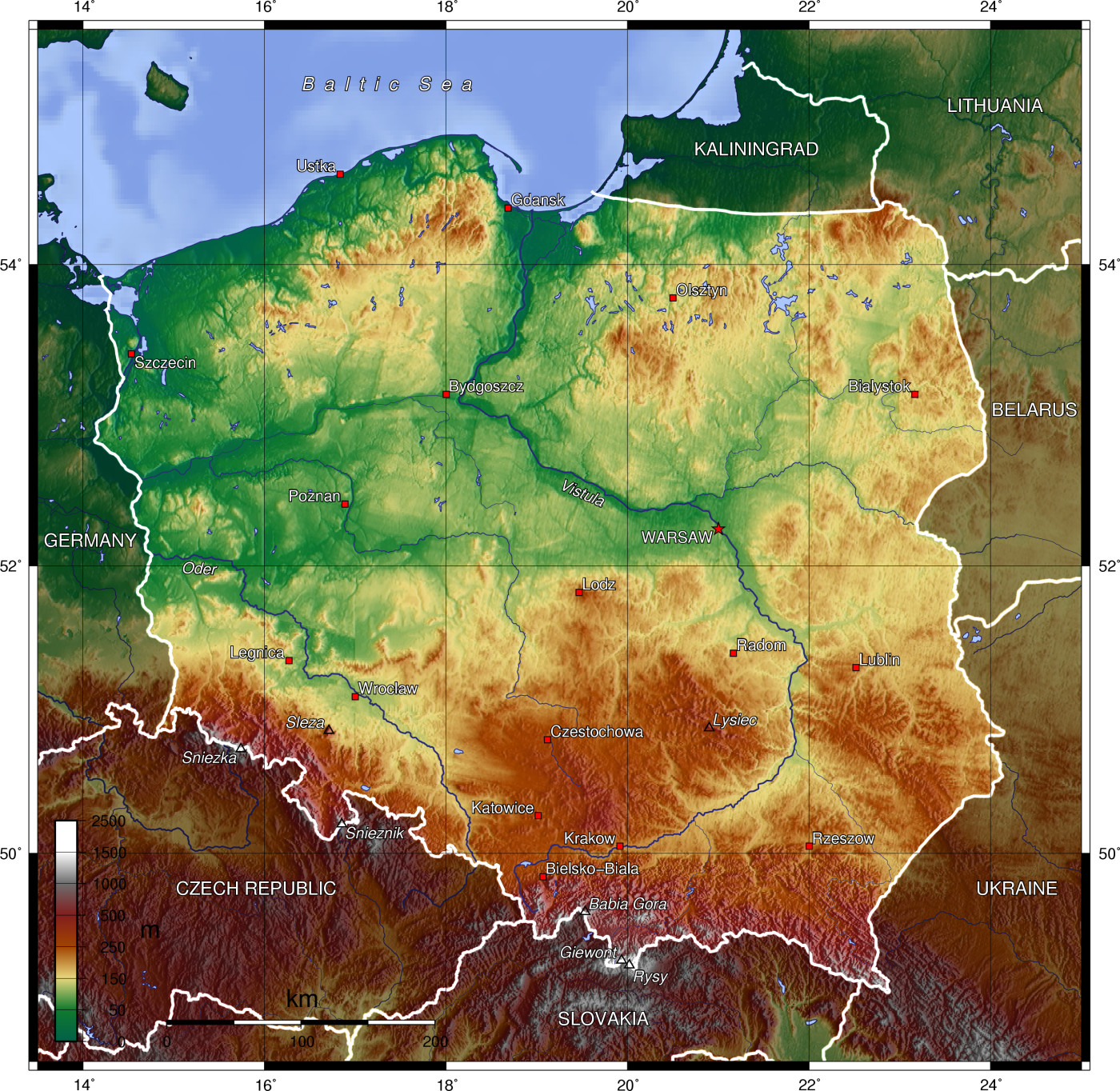
The position of mountains on the map of Poland

Mountain Volunteer Search and Rescue (Polish: Górskie Ochotnicze Pogotowie Ratunkowe (GOPR)) is a partially volunteer-run non-profit mountain rescue organisation in Poland, which helps people who have come into danger in the mountains, helps prevent accidents and protects wildlife. It aids both tourists who are visiting the mountains and hiking trails and residents of small, hard-to-reach mountain towns. In 2022, GOPR conducted over 2,550 operations, helping 2,699 people.

== History ==
The first attempts to create a mountain rescue service in the partitioned Poland took place in 1909. In 1952, all mountain rescue units started to operate under the GOPR umbrella, with the team responsible for the Tatra Mountains breaking out into its own organization in 1991.

Currently, the service is governed by the Polish Parliament's 2011 Act on safety and rescue in mountains and on organized ski areas (Polish: Ustawa o bezpieczeństwie i ratownictwie w górach i na zorganizowanych terenach narciarskich). According to this Act, mountain rescue services are financed from the national budget, local budgets, national park entry fees, and other sources, and such services cannot therefore require insurance or charge rescue fees.

As of December 2022, GOPR had 133 professional rescuers and 826 volunteer rescuers. In order to join the service, each rescuer needs to pass an exam and go through a trial period, during which they already begin to participate in rescue missions. The service has an agreement with Poland's air ambulance team to use its helicopters, though it is also in talks with local authorities and others to procure its own helicopters, which would be adapted specifically for mountain rescue use.

== Structure ==
GOPR is divided into seven divisions, one for every major mountain range in Poland, and is headquartered in Zakopane. It oversees a total area of 20 410 km^{2}, comprising all major mountain ranges in Poland, with the exception of the Tatras, which are managed by a separate team. They maintain 7 200 km of hiking trails and 425 ski objects. The corps is divided into the following groups:

- Karkonosze Group
- Bieszczady Group
- Beskidy Group
- Jura Group
- Krynica Group, (Beskid Sądecki, Low Beskids)
- Podhale Group
- Group Wałbrzych - Kłodzko

== See also ==
- TOPR
