= Valfréjus avalanche =

2016 avalanche in France

2016 Valfréjus avalanche
- Location within France
- Date: January 18, 2016
- Time: 13:50 (12:50GMT)
- Location: (France) Massif des Cerces, Alps
- Cause: Unstable snow formations
- Participants: 51
- Casualties: 6 dead, 5 injured

On 18 January 2016, six French Foreign Legionnaires were killed in an avalanche in the Massif des Cerces, France.

== Background ==
The combination of heavy winter snowfall and strong winds in the Alps led to unstable snow formations in the high peaks. The avalanche warning was raised to 3 out of 5 (Considerable) beforehand.

An avalanche bulletin for the mountain sector warned that a single skier could trigger a surface avalanche that could then take several layers in the snow pack down to 2 meters deep.

== Avalanche ==
On 18 January, a division of 51 Legionnaires, assigned to the 2nd Foreign Engineer Regiment (2nd REG) took part in an off-piste ski mountain exercise, to receive their Skier Certificate (BSM).

Deaths by citizenship
Citizenship	Deaths
France	1*
Madagascar	1*
Italy	1
Nepal	1
Moldova	1
Albania	1
Hungary	1
Total	6

The (2nd REG) provides combat engineering services to the French Army's 27th Mountain Infantry Brigade, who were also present during the military exercise. The course took place 60 kilometres (35 miles) south of Albertville and near the Valfréjus ski resort, in the Massif des Cerces.

The company was at a height of 2,600m (8,500 ft) when the avalanche struck at 13:50, while 5-6 of the skiers neared Col de Le Petit Argentier. A large slab of ice, about 100 meters wide, broke off a ridge causing a mass avalanche. Several branches of snow about 400 meters wide, engulfed 13 of the skiers in a steep sector of the valley. In all, 18 of the skiers downstream were either buried or shaken. The rest of the company remained at the foot of the slope, near the Pas du Roc peak.

Rescue teams arrived within minutes. The 13 skiers were recovered and found buried under a meter of snow by rescuers with the help of search dogs and avalanche victim detection kits (DVA)'s they were equipped with.

== Aftermath ==
French military and state prosecutors are investigating the case and assessing whether the unit took unnecessary risks. According to French media, the unit was due to be sent on a military operation. Around one-third of the company was projected to be deployed to the Sahel in the coming months in coordination with Operation Barkhane.

French president François Hollande expressed "the nation’s solidarity" over the deaths and wished the injured a speedy recovery. He asked Defence Minister Jean-Yves Le Drian to head to the scene of the accident.

== Fatalities ==
The nationalities of the 6 Legionnaires killed, a mix of veterans and new recruits, was released the following day. A Malagasy (dual French citizenship), Italian, Nepalese, Moldovan, Albanian, and Hungarian, aged between 21 and 33 were killed.
