= Mount Tsurugi =

Mount Tsurugi may refer to:

- Mount Tsurugi (Hokkaido) (剣山), in Hokkaido, Japan
- Mount Tsurugi (Russia), in Sakhalin, Russia
- Mount Tsurugi (Tokushima) (剣山), in Tokushima Prefecture, Japan
- Mount Tsurugi (Toyama) (剱岳), in Toyama Prefecture, Japan

== See also ==
- Tsurugisan (train)
