= Wildlife of Russia =

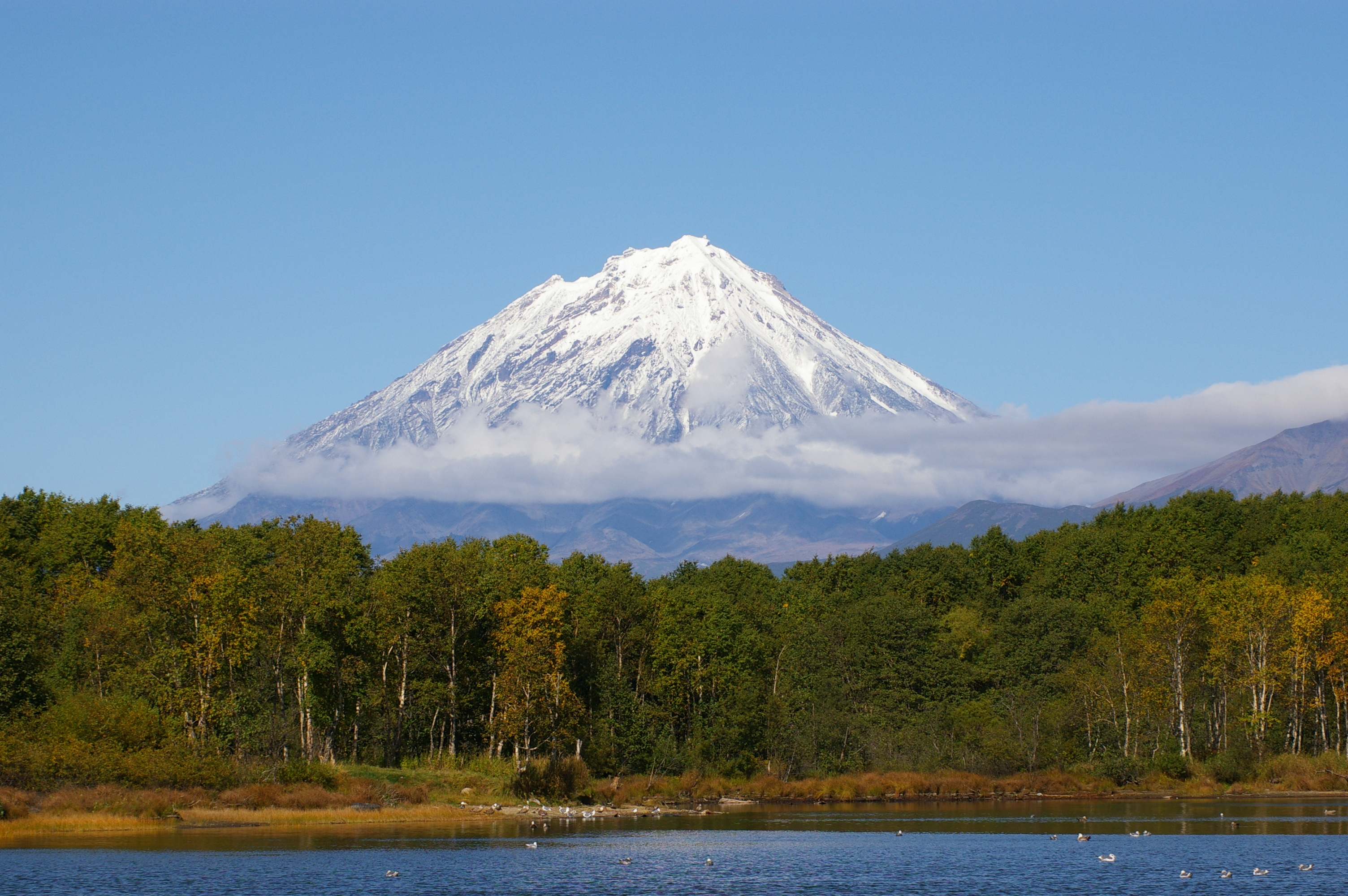
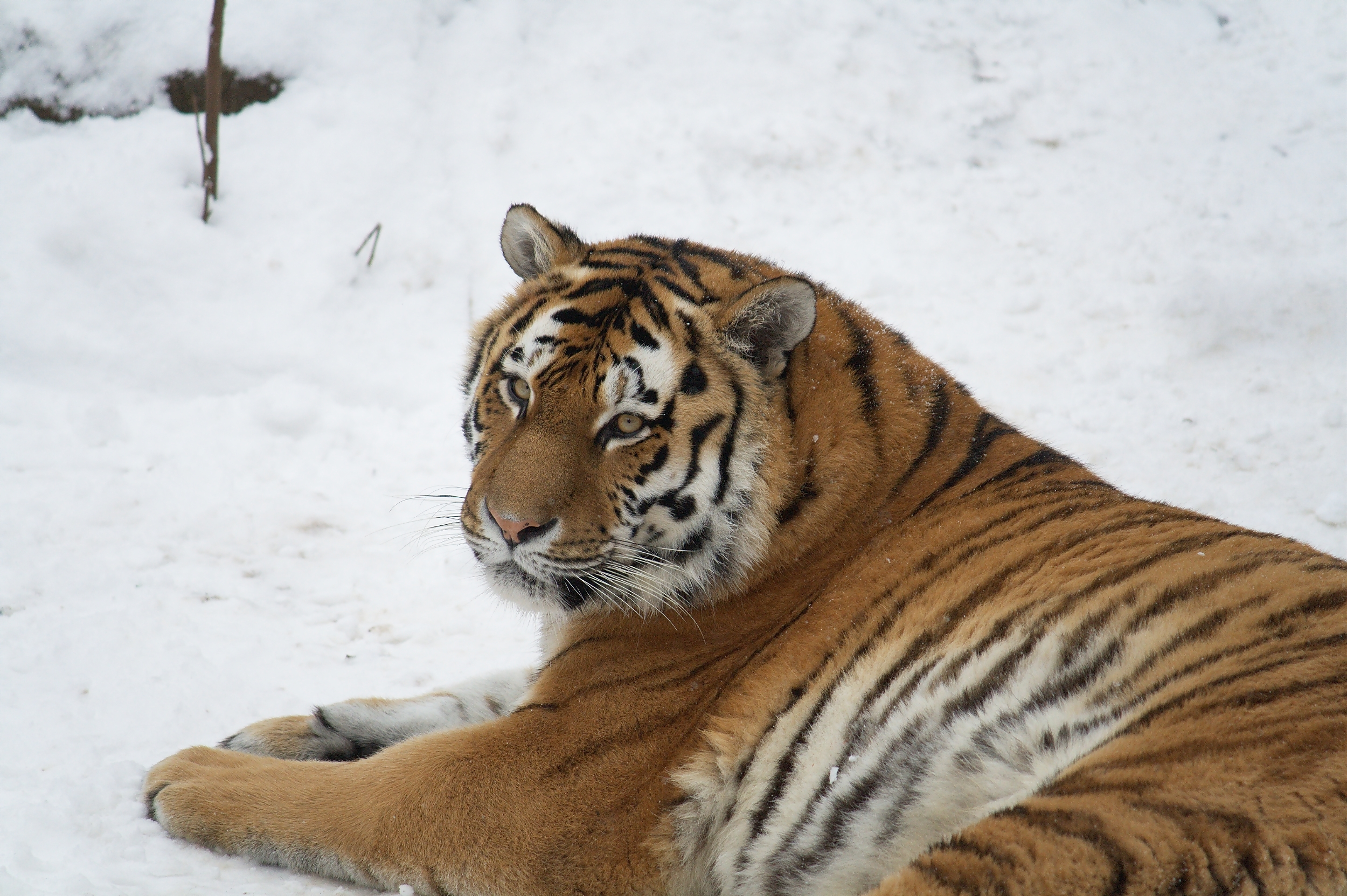
Left: taiga in Kamchatka Krai; right: female Amur tiger

The wildlife of Russia inhabits terrain that extends across 12 time zones and from the tundra region in the far north to the Caucasus Mountains and prairies in the south, including temperate forests which cover 70% of the country. Russia's forests comprise 22% of the forest in the world as well as 33% of all temperate forest.

According to the data furnished in the Red Data Book of the Russian Federation, as of 1996, there were 266 mammal species and 780 bird species under protection. Some of the threatened plant species are the Siberian cedar pine, Korean cedar pine in the far eastern part of the country, wild chestnut in the Caucasus. In the Russian Far East, brown bears, Eurasian lynx, and red deer, Amur tigers, Amur leopards, and Asiatic black bears are reported. There are also about 350 bird species and 30 percent of Russia's endangered species are found. Carnivores under threat include the Siberian tiger, numbered at 400, and the Amur leopard of which only 30 remained as of 2003.

== Geography ==
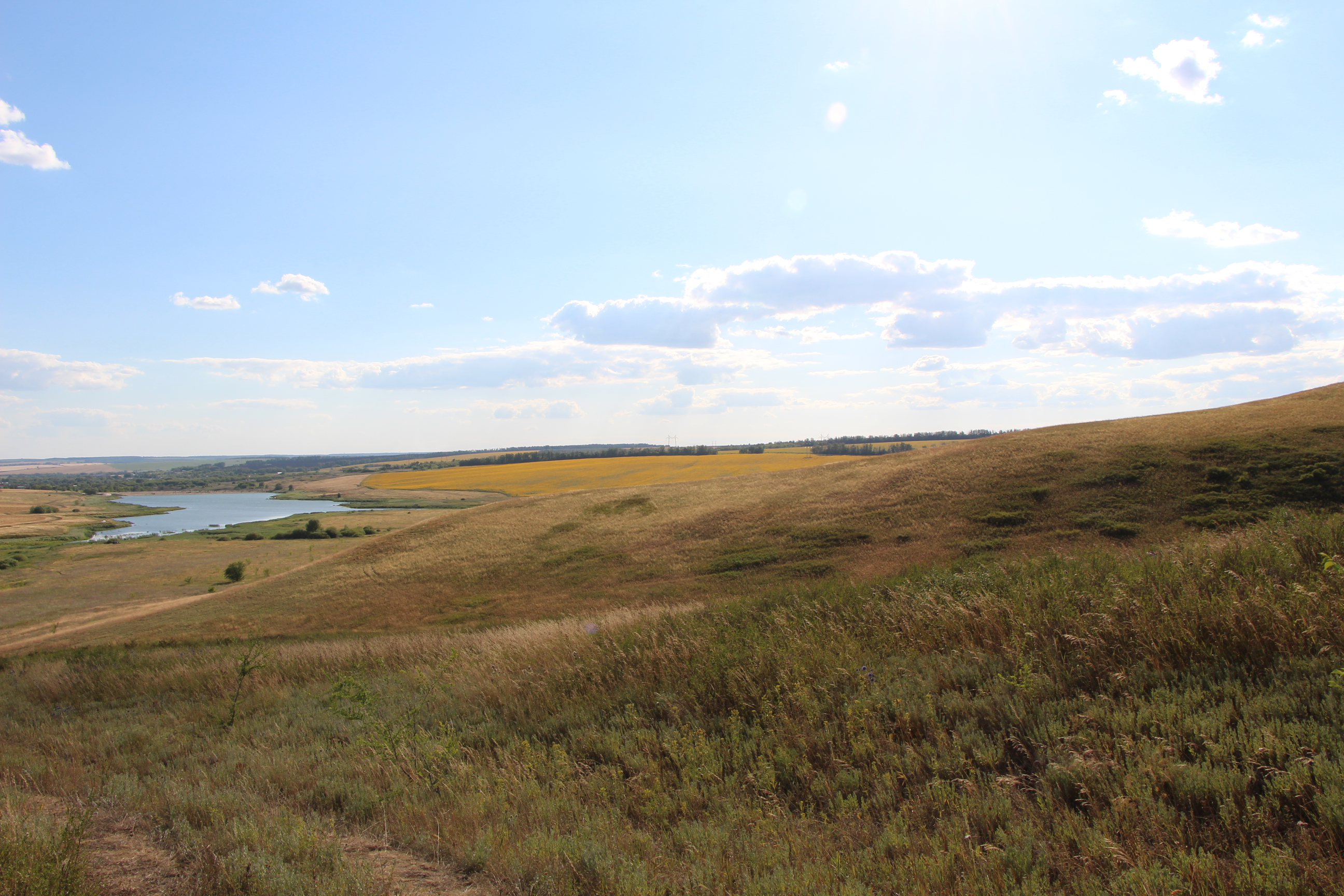
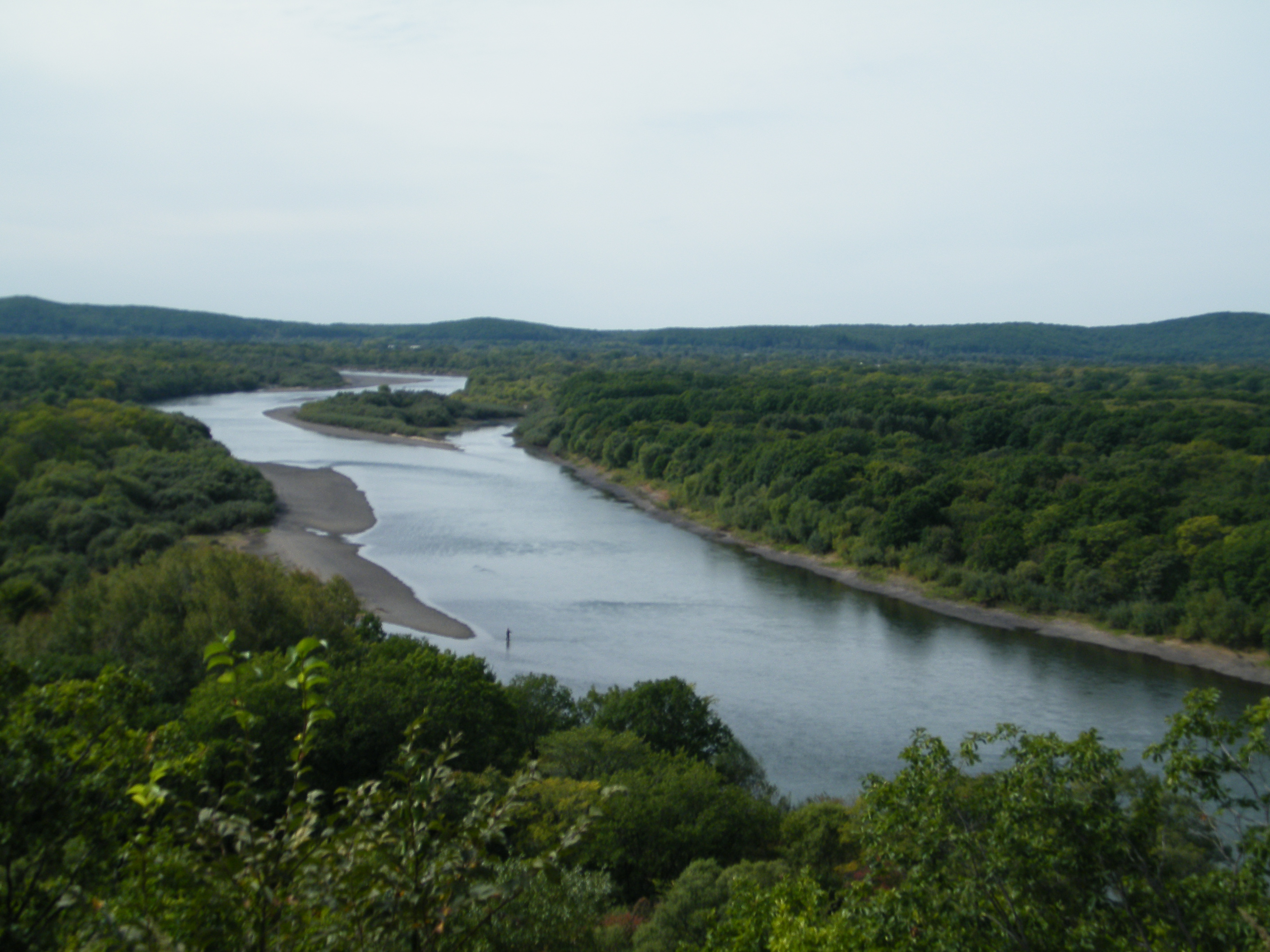
Left: Chubovskaya steppe; right: Ussuriland

Geographically, the tundra habitat lies in a zone extending from the northern coast 60 to 420 kilometres (37 to 260 mi) to the south; this gradually transforms into the extensive and dense forests of the taiga that include a large part of Siberia and then into the gently sloping steppe land with trees only on the river banks. Three distinctive zones are the Caucasus in southern Russia, the active volcanic region of Kamchatka in the far northeast; and Ussuriland in the extreme southeast; in the latter, the indigenous animals and vegetation are akin to South East Asia rather than Siberia.

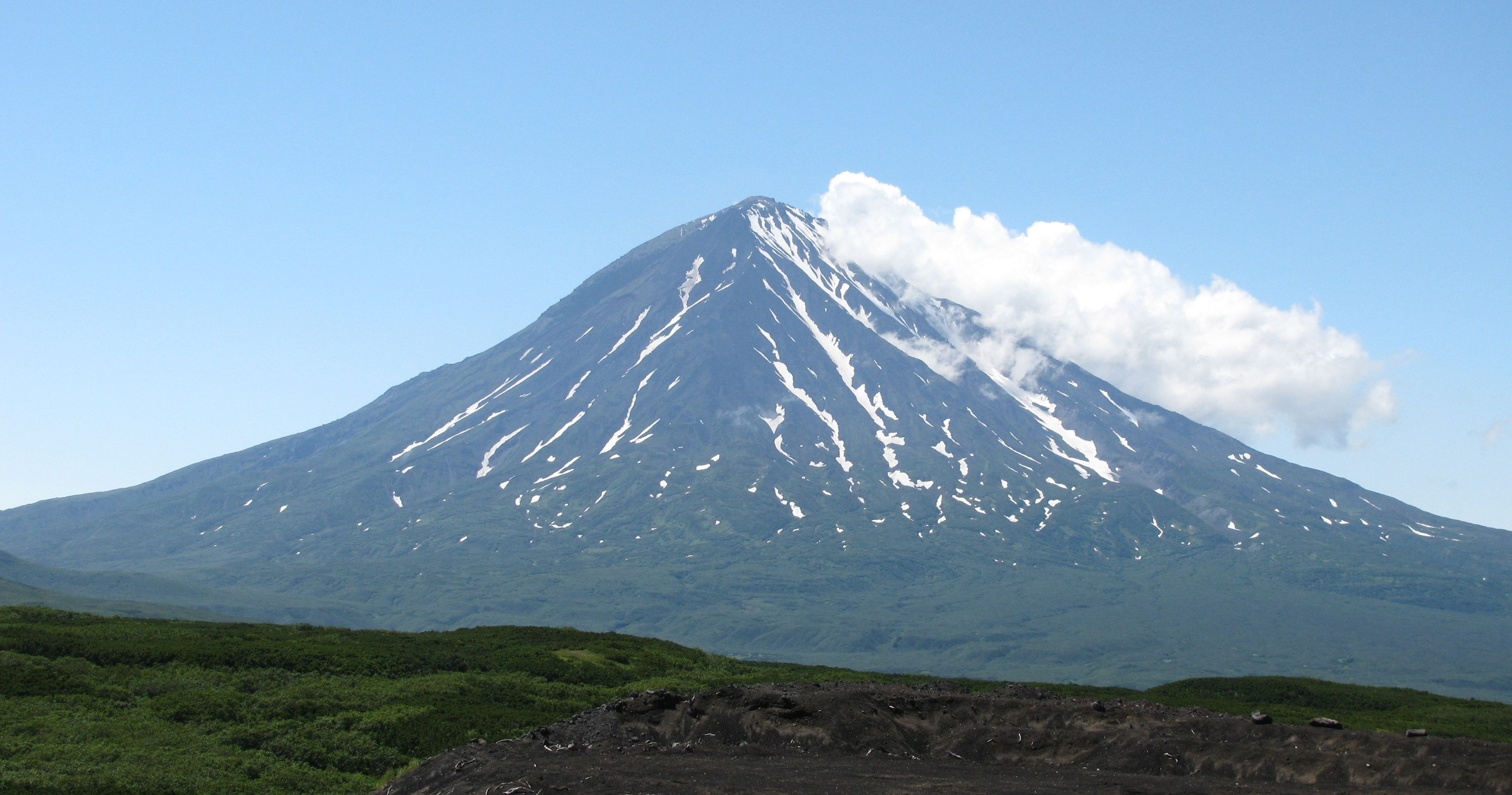
Opala volcano in the southern part of Kamchatka.

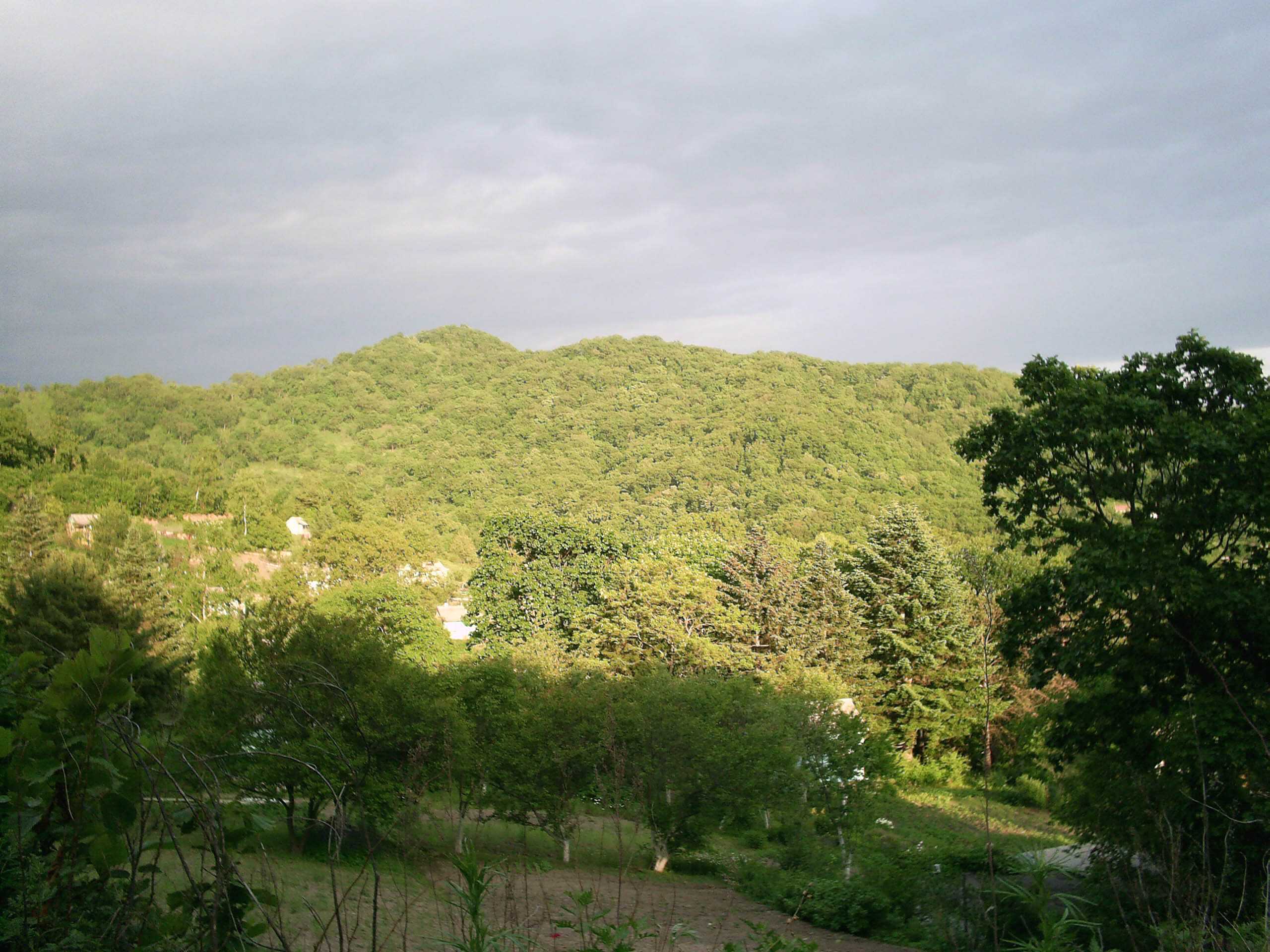
Forests of Sikhote-Alin range

The tundra region is entirely within the Arctic Circle and is the most inhospitable terrain with permafrost extending to a depth of 1,450 metres (4,760 ft). Taiga is the largest forest in the world covering 5,000,000 square kilometres (1,900,000 sq mi) and accounting for 25% of world's wood reserves. Winter season is the harshest with biting cold conditions. When snow melts here it becomes a "spongy wetland with lakes, pools and puddles". The steppe land lies from Voronezh and Senatov to Kuban area to north of the Caucasus. It extends into south western Siberia. The topography is flat and undulating with dominance of black soil (chernozem). The region is drained by the Volga River forming a delta before it debouches into the Caspian Sea. The steppe "gives way to alpine regions in the Caucasus with 6,000 highly varied plant species". Kamchatka region has the phenomenon of geothermal bubbling which has resulted in several volcanoes of which 30 are active. Ussuriland has remarkable monsoon forests. The prominent land form here is the Sikhote-Alin range that extends for more than 1,000 kilometres (620 mi), running parallel to the coast.

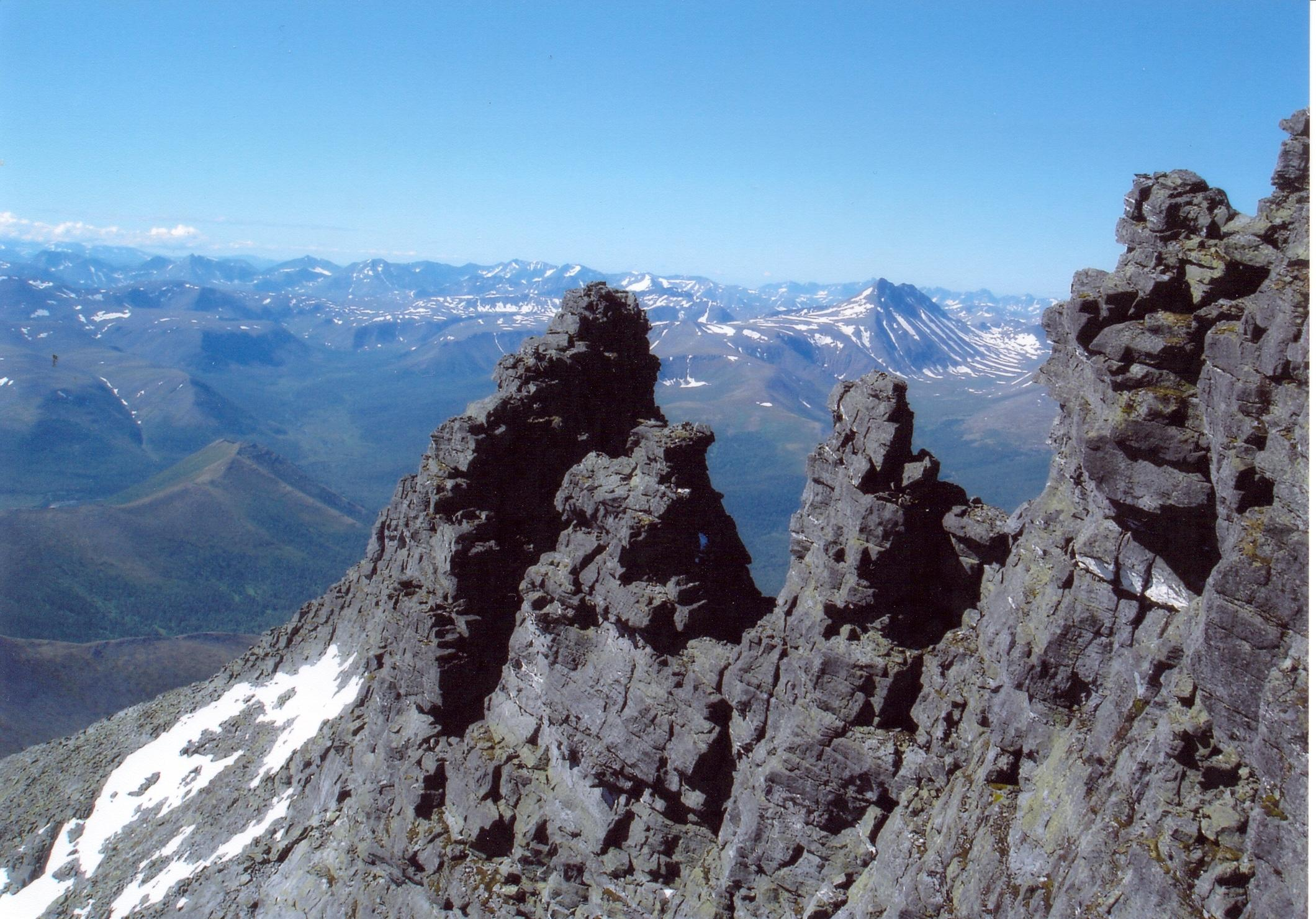
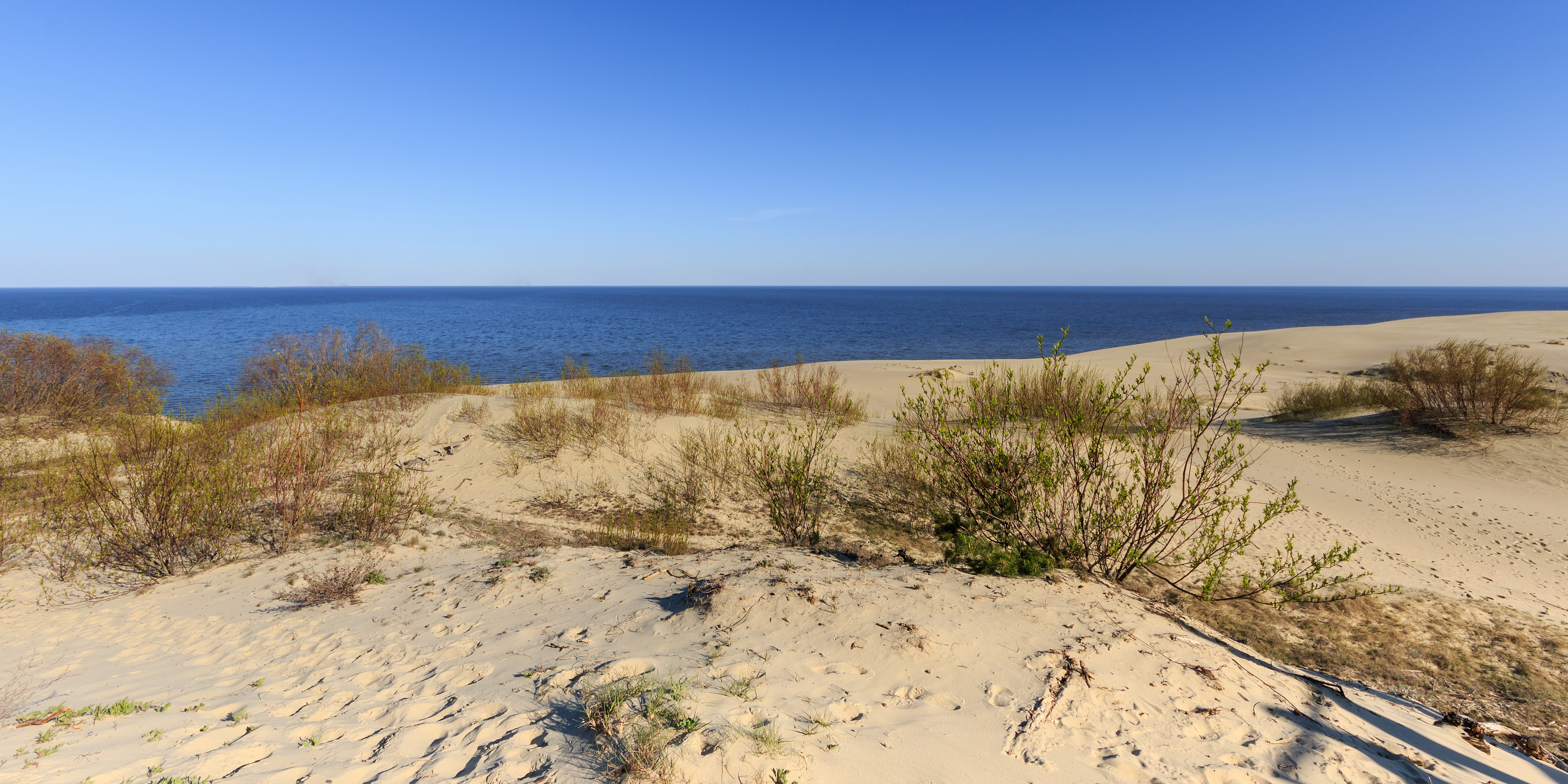
Left: Ural Mountains near the village Saranpaul; right: dunes at Morskoe in Curonian Spit

Russian wildlife has been categorized by World Wide Fund for Nature into 13 bioregions which, as of 2012, have 101 zapovedniks (strictly protected areas) covering more than 33.5 million hectares (82.7 million acres) and 38 national parks (protected areas with implemented zoning). Zapovedniks (pronounced: Zap-o-VED-nik) are strictly protected scientific nature reserves under IUCN category I. The Zapovednik, Barguzinsky, was the first zapovednik that was established in 1916 covering the eastern shore areas of Lake Baikal. The zapovedniks cover the tundra region of the far north, the steppe (prairies) of the south, the Black Sea and the Bering Sea, encompassing a tremendous diversity of territory and play a critical role in nature conservation. The regions and the number of reserves in each of then are: eight in the Arctic region of Russia, twenty in the Kola-Karelian & Eastern European Forest, thirteen in the Eastern European Forest-Steppe, Steppe & Caspian Semi-Desert, nine in Ural Mountains, six in the Caucasus (also Prielbrusye National Park and Sochinsky National Park, four in the Western Siberian Forest, four in Central Siberia, eight in Altai-Sayansky, four in Baikal (and Zabaykalsky National Park), four in Zabaikal, fifteen in Amur-Sakhalin and five in Kamchatka-Okhotsk Sea. UNESCO listed World Heritage Sites in these regions are: Virgin Komi Forests of the Urals, the Lake Baikal, the Volcanoes of Kamchatka, the Altai Mountains, the Western Caucasus, the Curonian Spit (the Kurshskaya Kosa National Park), the Central Sikhote-Alin, Uvs Lake Basin on the border with Mongolia, and the Wrangel Island Reserve in the Chukchi Sea in the Russian Far East.

== Legal framework ==
The Forest Legislation 1993 of the Russian Federation is the basic legal framework for forest management. The principle under this legislation underlines the federal status of forests in enforcing compliance by all forest users and governs the use of the forest stock, states the rules of forestry, reproduction, conservation and protection of forests and other norms and rules. The management of the Forest Fund is the responsibility of the Federal Forest Service, further delegated to the forest management districts.

The Game Department's rules are based on the Law on Protection and Use of Wildlife 1982, which defines game species on all lands, except the designated protected areas such as the zaponvedniks. The 250 animal species and 500 plant species listed in Russia's Red Book (as of 1984) are under the jurisdiction of the Ministry of Environmental Protection and Natural Resources (MEPNR), which is being updated. Non-game species are not included under legal protection.

A new draft of the forest code, which is a part of Russian law, governs the sale of the forest to private companies. Leasing of forests to private shows/firms regulated by the central government is given for a period up to 49 years.

== Flora and funga ==
The ice fields of tundra are covered on the top by lichens, mosses, grasses and flowers, which for nine months are buried under snow. There are only a few trees and bushes here which are in a twisted dwarfed condition as their roots can not penetrate the permafrost. The taiga forest is densely populated with spruces, firs, pines and larch. On the forest floors grass, moss, lichen, berries and mushrooms are reported. The steppe consists of croplands and grass lands. In the Volga Delta, Caspian lotus flowers in pink and white spread across the water during the summer. The Caucasus region has 6,000 plant species of various types including wild flowers. In Ussuriland, there exists a lush monsoon forest quite different from the taiga forest, and in this, the trees and undergrowth are draped with lianas and vines.

== Fauna ==
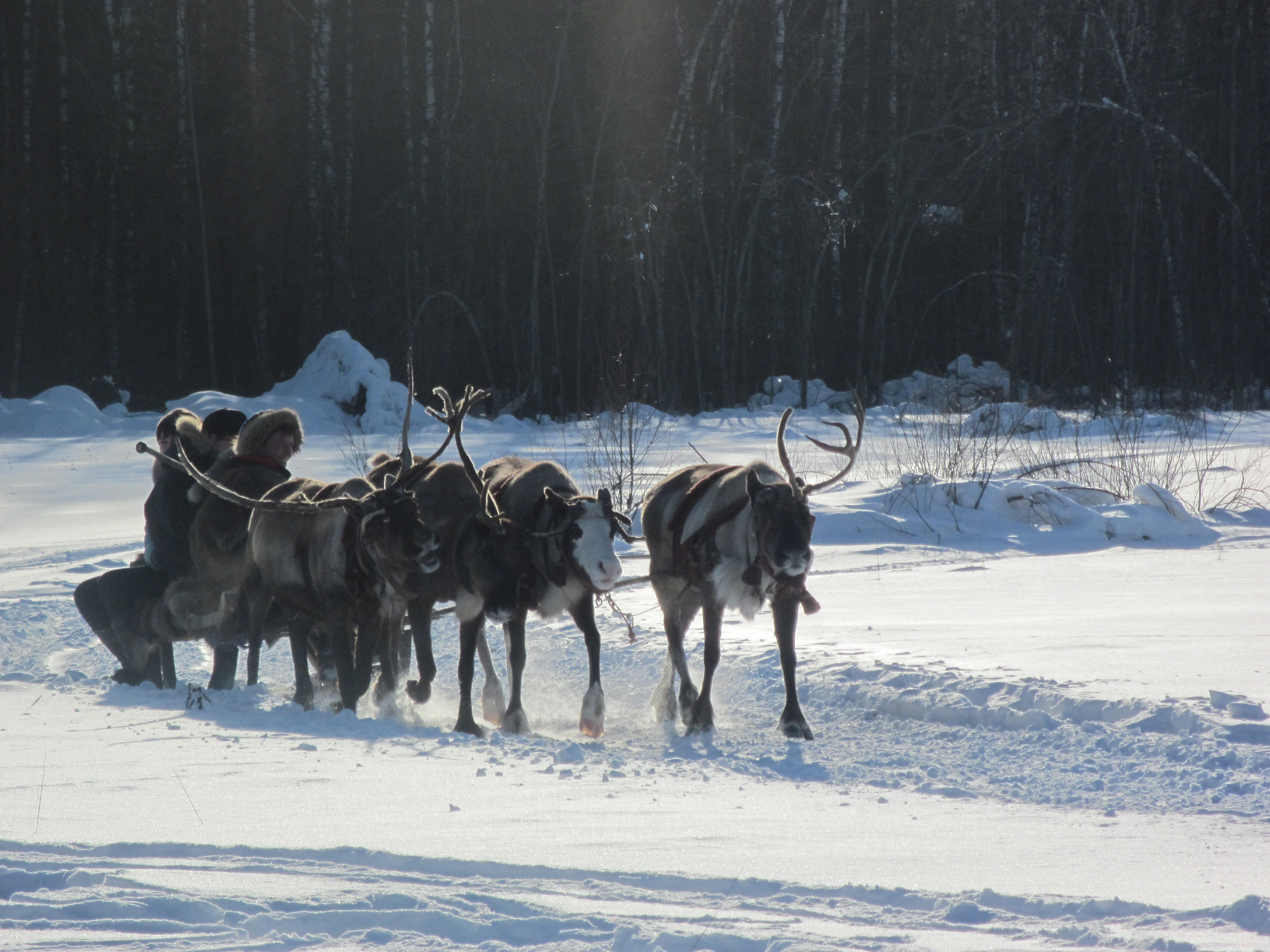
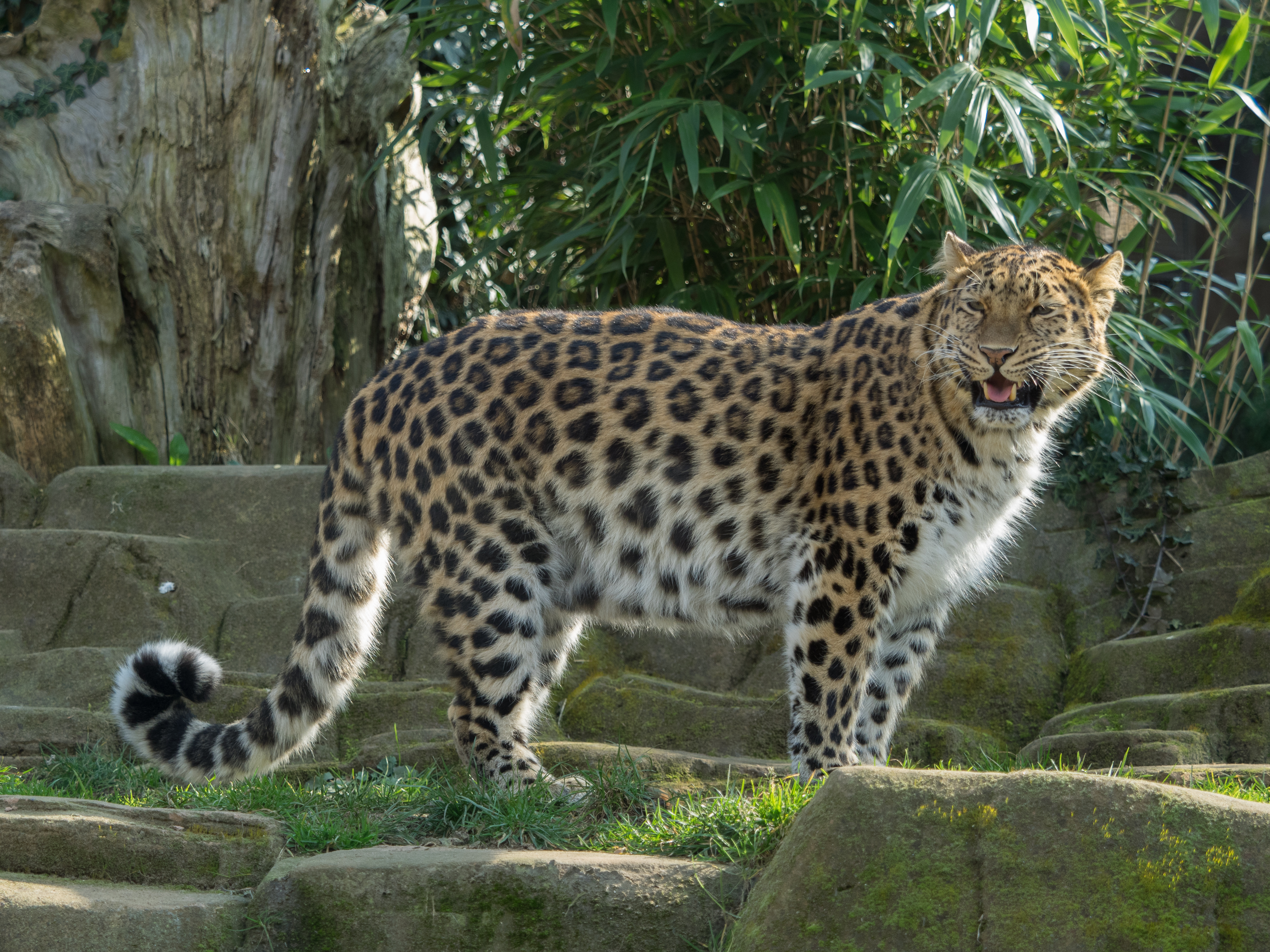
Left: carriage pulled by reindeer; right: Amur leopard

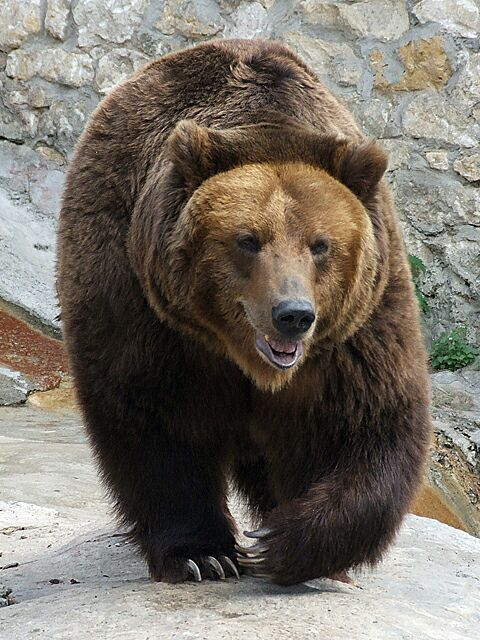
Russian brown bear

Due to extreme weather conditions, wildlife in the tundra is limited. Reindeer, which can endure temperatures down to −50 °C (−58 °F), thrive here in great numbers; their count is said to be four million. Lemmings are among the rodents present. Other species present include Arctic fox, seals, walruses (near Chukotka), polar bears and whales. In the taiga forests, species include squirrels, chipmunks, voles and lemmings. The carnivores are polecats, brown bear, lynx, wolves, foxes, wolverines and the sable. Elk, a large deer about 2 metres (6 ft 7 in) in height up to the shoulder, are common in this habitat. Steppe animals include wild boar as well as 30 other mammal species. A small antelope species known a saiga antelope is also present but is under threat due to hunting. Animals species in the Caucasus region are tur (two species of mountain goat), bezoar (wild goat) endangered mouflon (mountain sheep), chamois (goat-antelope), Persian leopard, brown bear and bison. Avifauna species are bearded vulture (lammergeier), endangered griffon vulture, imperial eagle, peregrine falcon, goshawk, and snow cock. Spawning salmon are abundant in the rivers of peninsular Kamchatka on account of enrichment of the region by volcanic ash. Other animal species in this region are Kamchatkan brown bears, sea otters, and sea eagles (predators of salmon with 2.5 metres (8 ft 2 in) wingspan). Avifauna species number 200, including auks, tufted puffins and swans. The Siberian tiger is the most prominent species in Primorsky Krai; as of 2015 there were 480 to 540 remaining. The Amur leopard is also present; only 30 of these exist, and poaching threatens them. Other species include wolves, sables, and Asian black bears. Zov Tigra National Park has been established in this region to aid in conserving these species.

== Bibliography ==
- Russia: Forest Policy During Transition. World Bank Publications. 1 January 1997. p. 246. ISBN 978-0-8213-3896-4.
- Richmond, Simon (15 September 2010). Russia. Lonely Planet. ISBN 978-1-74220-373-7.
