= Guglielmo Gargiolli =

Italian mathematician and engineer

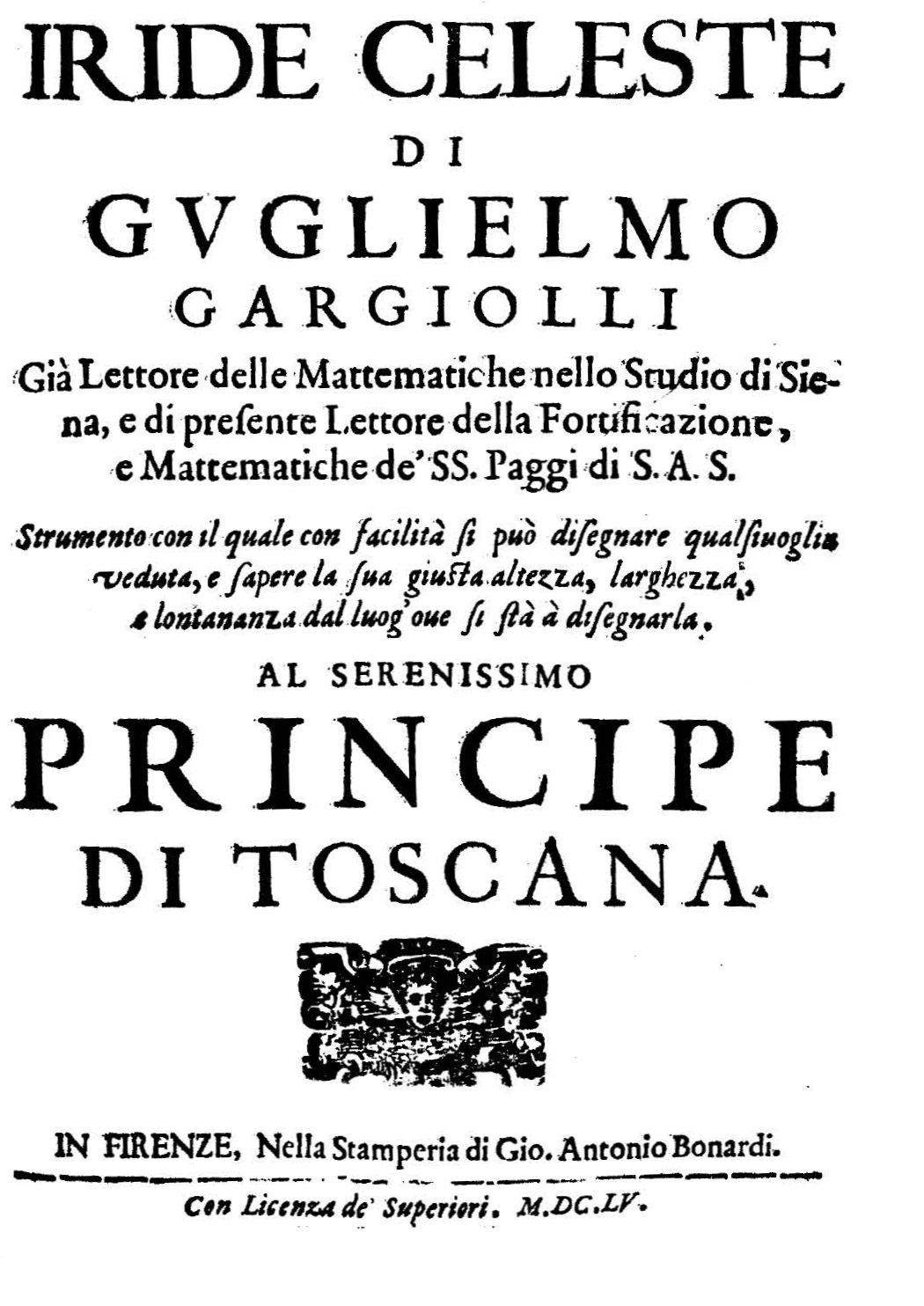
Iride celeste, title page (1655)

Guglielmo Gargiolli was a 17th-century Italian mathematician and engineer.

He was Lecturer of Mathematics at the University of Siena, and Lecturer of Military Engineering and Mathematics at the Court of Florence. His book, Iride celeste ("Celestial Iris"), was noted for its explanation of how to estimate from a distance the height of an object and its distance from the observer.

== Works ==
- Iride celeste (in Italian). Firenze: Giovanni Antonio Bonardi. 1655.
