= Elbrus climbing routes =

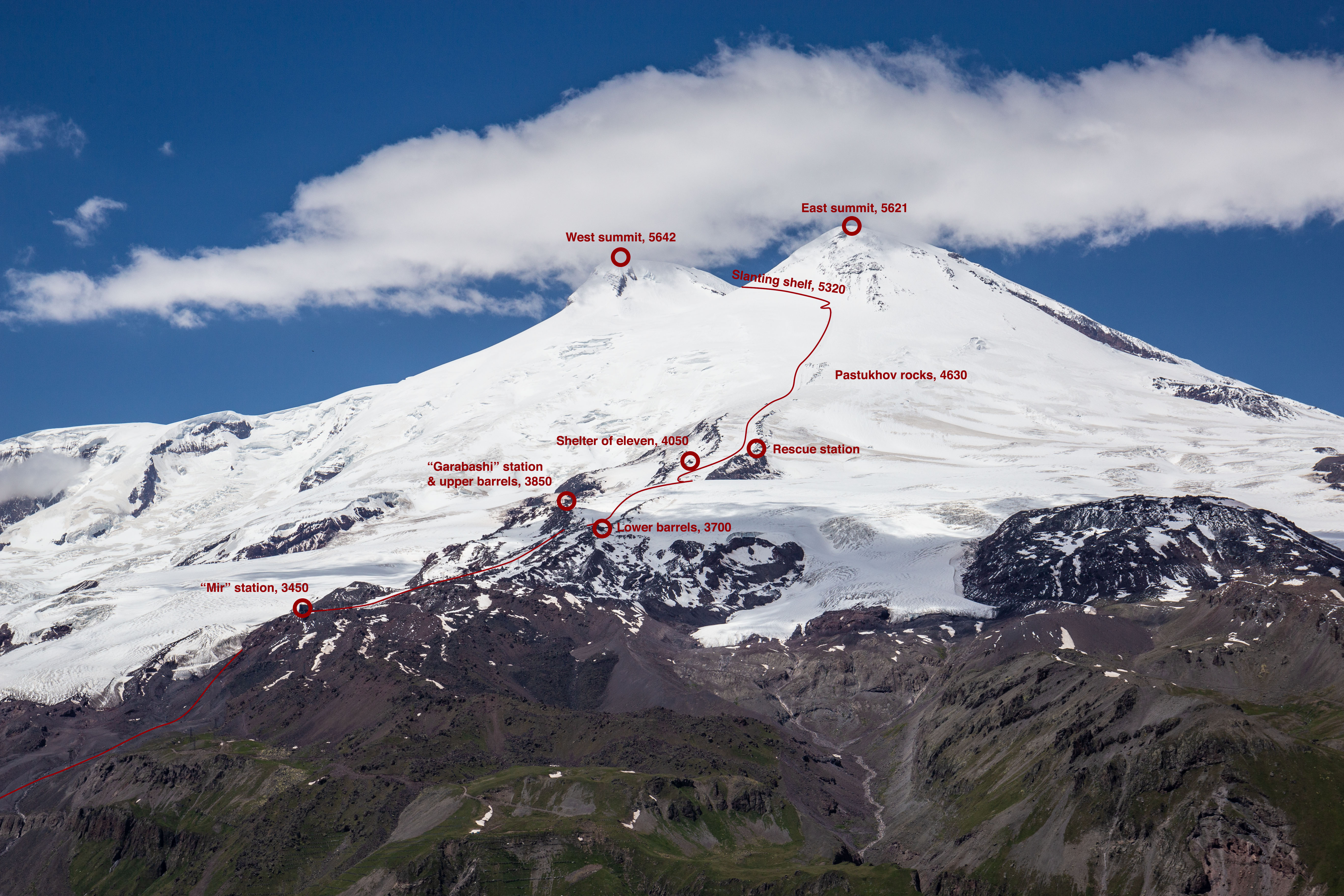
Elbrus south route

There exist a number of climbing routes used to reach the summit of the Mount Elbrus, most based in approaches through Prielbrusye National Park on its southeastern flank.

== Normal Route ==
The Normal Route is the easiest, safest and fastest on account of the cable car and chairlift system which operates from about 9am till 3pm. Starting for the summit at about 2am from the Diesel Hut should allow just enough time to get back down to the chairlift if movement is efficient. In bad weather the chairlift section may be closed, also note the chairlift ride is 15-minutes long and can be very cold.

The majority of groups take the cable car system from Azau roadhead to Mir Station from where either a one-hour walk or a chairlift takes them to Garabashi – "The Barrels" or to Leaprus hut – also called "The crashed UFO". Above it may be possible to hire a snowcat to go to the Diesel Hut (site of the burnt "Priut 11" Hut) or higher to Pastukhova Rocks. Walking this takes 90 minutes to the hut and almost two hours more to the rocks. The walk to the Saddle takes another three to four hours and from there to the summit, a further 90 minutes should be allowed for.

There are no major difficulties on the route, however after strong winds icy sections may be exposed and a fall could result in a slide. Particular care should be taken on the traversing ascent from the Saddle. The Saddle hut is a ruin that offers no shelter. There are few crevasses of any size or danger if one sticks to the route, but straying only 50m off the route could lead the climber into dangerous terrain. Details:

Sample Itinerary

1. Fly to Mineralnye Vody. Private bus transfer to base hotel in Baksan Valley.
2. Acclimatization walk from hotel.
3. Ascend cable car system to Garabashi Huts or Leaprus hut. Possible acclimatisation walk to Pastukhova Rocks.
4. Acclimatisation walk to Pastukhova Rocks. Possible attempt on summit if very well acclimatised on arrival.
5. Attempt on Elbrus.
6. Another possible attempt on Elbrus.
7. Descend to hotel in the Baksan Valley.
8. Drive back to Mineralnye Vody for return flights.

== Kiukurtliu Route ==
A longer ascent route starts from below the cable-way Mir station and heads west over glacier slopes towards the Khotiutau pass. Some distance before reaching this the south spur of the Kiukurtliu Cupola is climbed to a broad glaciated saddle behind pt.4912 (top of the SW spur). Now a rising traverse north is made to attain the easy northwest spur by which the summit is gained. This expedition involves three nights' camping–bivouacs; parties also need a rope, axe and crampons.

== Other routes ==
Climbing Elbrus from other directions is a tougher proposition because of lack of permanent high facilities. Douglas Freshfield always maintained that a route from the east up the Iryk valley, Irykchat glacier and over the Irykchat pass (3667m) on to snowfields below long rock ribs of the east spur would become the shortest and most used approach. A hut built long ago on the north side of the lrykchat pass is now wrecked. In addition, the high elevation change calls for at least two camp-bivouacs.

== Permits ==
Three are required:

1. Border Zone Permit. Foreigners require a permit to be in any area south of the Baksan river. This is obtained at the military head office of the border rangers in Nalchik. Climbers should also be registered at their local posts: in the Baksan valley at the Alpine Base Baksan; in the Adyrsu valley near the Alpine Camp Ullutau.
  Pogranotryad in Nalchik issues permits at 192 Kabardinskaya street. Passes are issued between 9.00 and 13.00, and the following documents are necessary:
  - a stamped letter of application from an organisation approved by the Ministry of Foreign Affairs (Russia);
  - passports of all participants;
  - a route sheet.
2. Prielbrusye National Park Permit. No strict system exists for obtaining this permit. Park offices are located in Elbrus village.
3. OVIR Registration. Foreigners have to be registered in OVIR (Visa and Registration department) in Tyrnyauz. Generally hotels can arrange registration. Last year the fee was 50 roubles per person. It may be obtained at Mineralnye Vody airport at a higher price. Unregistered climbers may face a fine.

All of these permits can be arranged in advance by agents.
