= Peperomia subdiscoidea =

Conservation status
- Endangered (IUCN 3.1)

Scientific classification
- Kingdom: Plantae
- Clade: Embryophytes
- Clade: Tracheophytes
- Clade: Angiosperms
- Clade: Magnoliids
- Order: Piperales
- Family: Piperaceae
- Genus: Peperomia
- Species: P. subdiscoidea

Binomial name
- Peperomia subdiscoidea Sodiro

Species of flowering plant

Peperomia subdiscoidea is a species of plant in the family Piperaceae. It is endemic to Ecuador. It is a very poorly documented species of the pepper family. Due to the lack of documentation, an average height could not be found. Considering the average heights of members of the Piperaceae family, it likely averages a height of anywhere from 2-18 inches.
