= Caucasian tur =

Caucasian tur may refer to either of two species of mountain-dwelling goat-antelopes of the genus Capra:

- East Caucasian tur, which lives exclusively in the eastern half of the Caucasus Mountains
- West Caucasian tur, which lives exclusively in the western half of the Caucasus Mountains
