= Tallest mountain =

The superlative, tallest mountain is often used when what is meant is highest mountain.

The height of a mountain is normally expressed as its altitude above mean sea level. This means Mount Everest is the highest mountain above sea level on Earth, but it is not the tallest mountain, either on Earth or off it.

There is no set standard for measuring how tall a mountain is. Since other Solar System planets or asteroids do not have large seas of water, unlike Earth, determining a "sea level" is not practical in all cases. Other ways need to be found to measure how tall a mountain is. This frequently makes measuring a mountain's tallness above its surrounding terrain more practical. One way to do this is to measure the vertical distance from a mountain's base to its peak. On Earth, measured this way, Mauna Kea is the tallest mountain. Two of the tallest mountains discovered in the Solar System are Olympus Mons, a volcano on Mars, and the central peak of the impact crater Rheasilvia, on the asteroid Vesta.

Another way to determine tallness is to measure the distance of a mountain's summit from the centre of the planet, or asteroid, the mountain is on. Due to different planetary sizes, this is only useful for comparing mountains on the same planet. For Earth, the summit of Mount Chimborazo, a volcano in Ecuador, is 2.1 kilometres (1.3 mi) further from the centre of the Earth than the summit of Mount Everest is.

== See also ==
- List of tallest mountains in the Solar System
- List of mountain peaks by prominence
- List of highest mountains on Earth
- Summits farthest from the Earth's center
- Extremes on Earth
