= Prielbrusye National Park =

National park surrounding Mount Elbrus

- Russian: Приэльбрусье (национальный парк) (Also: Prielbrus'e)
- IUCN category II (national park)
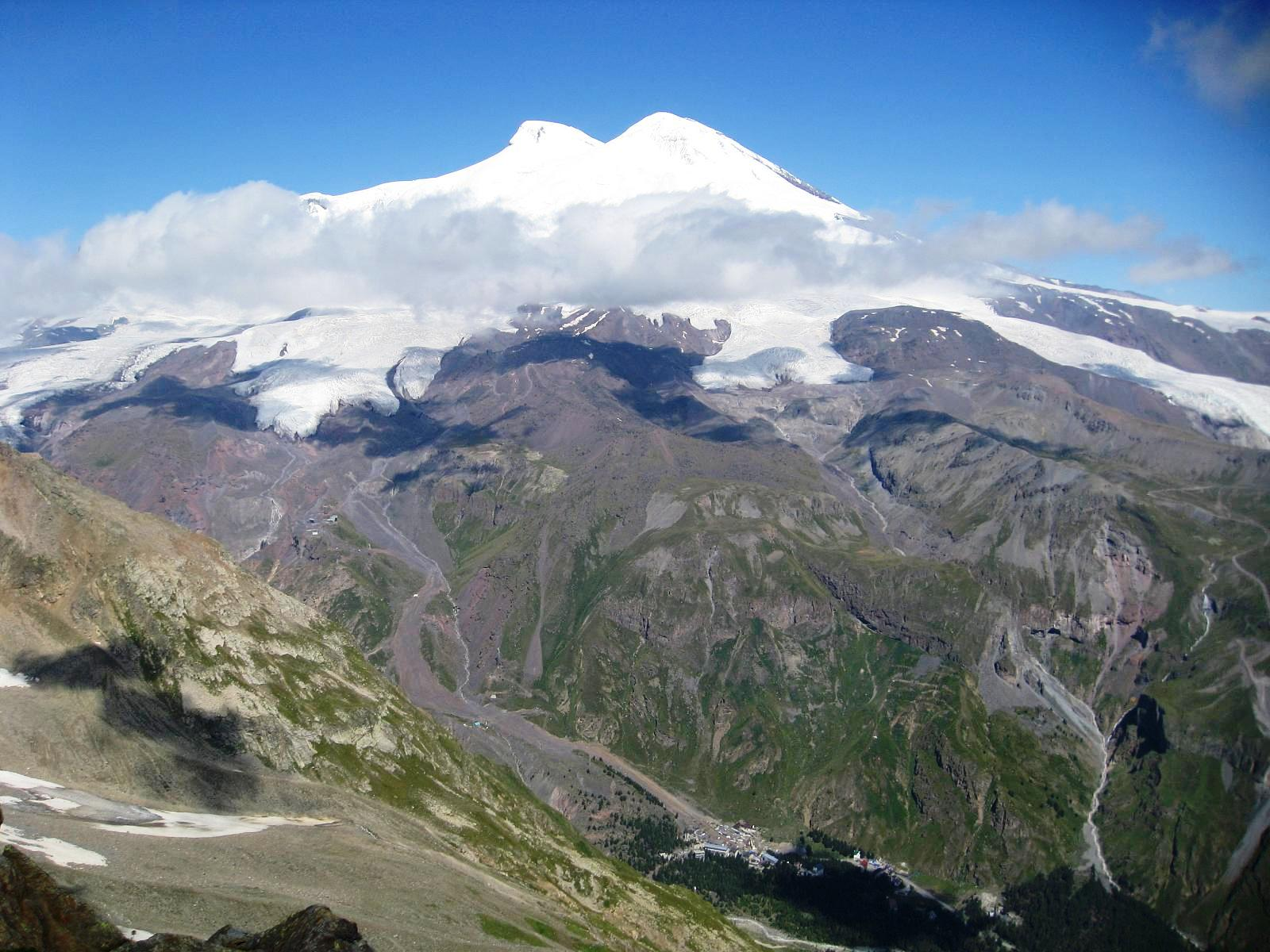
- Mount Elbrus in Prielbrusye NP

- Location within European Russia Location within Europe
- Location: Kabardino-Balkaria
- Nearest city: Nalchik
- Coordinates: 43°21′11″N 42°33′39″E
- Area: 1,010,200 hectares (2,496,259 acres; 3,900 sq mi)
- Established: 1986
- Governing body: Ministry of Natural Resources and Environment (Russia)
- Website: http://www.elbruspark.com/

Prielbrusye National Park (Russian: Приэльбрусье (национальный парк)) (also, Prielbrus'e, in English, "area by Mount Elbrus") is in the area around Mount Elbrus (also called Prielbrusye in Russian), the highest mountain in Europe at 5,642 meters above sea level. The relative isolation of steep gorges has led to high levels of endemism and biodiversity. The park is in the central Caucasus Mountains, one of 22 national parks in the Caucasus of different nationalities, covering 1.8% of the region. The park is situated in Elbrussky District and Zolsky District, in the southwestern corner of the Kabardino-Balkar Republic of Russia.

== Topography ==
Prielbrusye National Park is located on the peaks and north slope of the central Caucasus Mountains, with some southern slope areas, at elevations ranging from 1400 – 5642 meters. The terrain includes mountain peaks and side-ridges, glaciers, lava flows, lake basins, and lower elevations, a limited system of forested river valleys. Mount Elbrus is on the western boundary of the park, on the border with the Karachay-Cherkess Republic. The headwaters of the Malka River form in the glaciers of Elbrus and through a plateau below the glacial source, flowing north and east. The Baksan River flow to the east of the mountain through the southern tier of the park. On the southern border of the park is the national border with Georgia. Approximately 155 km^{2}., or about 15.3% of the territory of the park, is either glacier or permanent snow.

== Ecoregion and climate ==
Prielbrusye is located in the Caucasus mixed forests, one of the most biologically diverse ecoregions in the world. The diversity is due to the meeting of different ecological zones, and to the elevation variation.

Because of its elevation, Prielbrusye has an Arctic climate (Köppen climate classification, (ET)). This is a local climate in which at least one month has an average temperature high enough to melt snow (0 °C (32 °F)), but no month with an average temperature in excess of 10 °C (50 °F). Actual temperatures in Prielbrusye show extreme variation due to extreme elevation differences.

== Flora and fauna ==
Elevation zones drive the flora of the park. At the lowest elevations in the river valleys are deep coniferous forests of mostly pine. The under story at this level is a mixture of juniper, barberry, and wild rose. Where the areas are wetter, the under story includes thickets of wild raspberries, currants, and gooseberries. Above that is a thin belt of broadleaf trees and shrubs in the sub-alpine zone. Above that are alpine meadows and finally snow, rock and ice at the highest levels.

The park is home to the Caucasian Mountain Ground Squirrels, Chamoiss, West Caucasian turs, East Caucasian turs, Caspian red deer, Roe deer, Persian leopards, Gray wolves, European jackals, red foxes, Caucasian lynx, wild boars and Syrian brown bears.

== Tourism ==
Prielbrusye is a center for mountain sports - skiing, hiking and climbing. The park also supports camping, all-terrain vehicle tours, and eco-tours. Tourism, by both residents and foreigners, is encouraged, and there are facilities within the park (there are six small settlements within the boundaries of the park.) The park is 90 km west of the city of Nalchik.

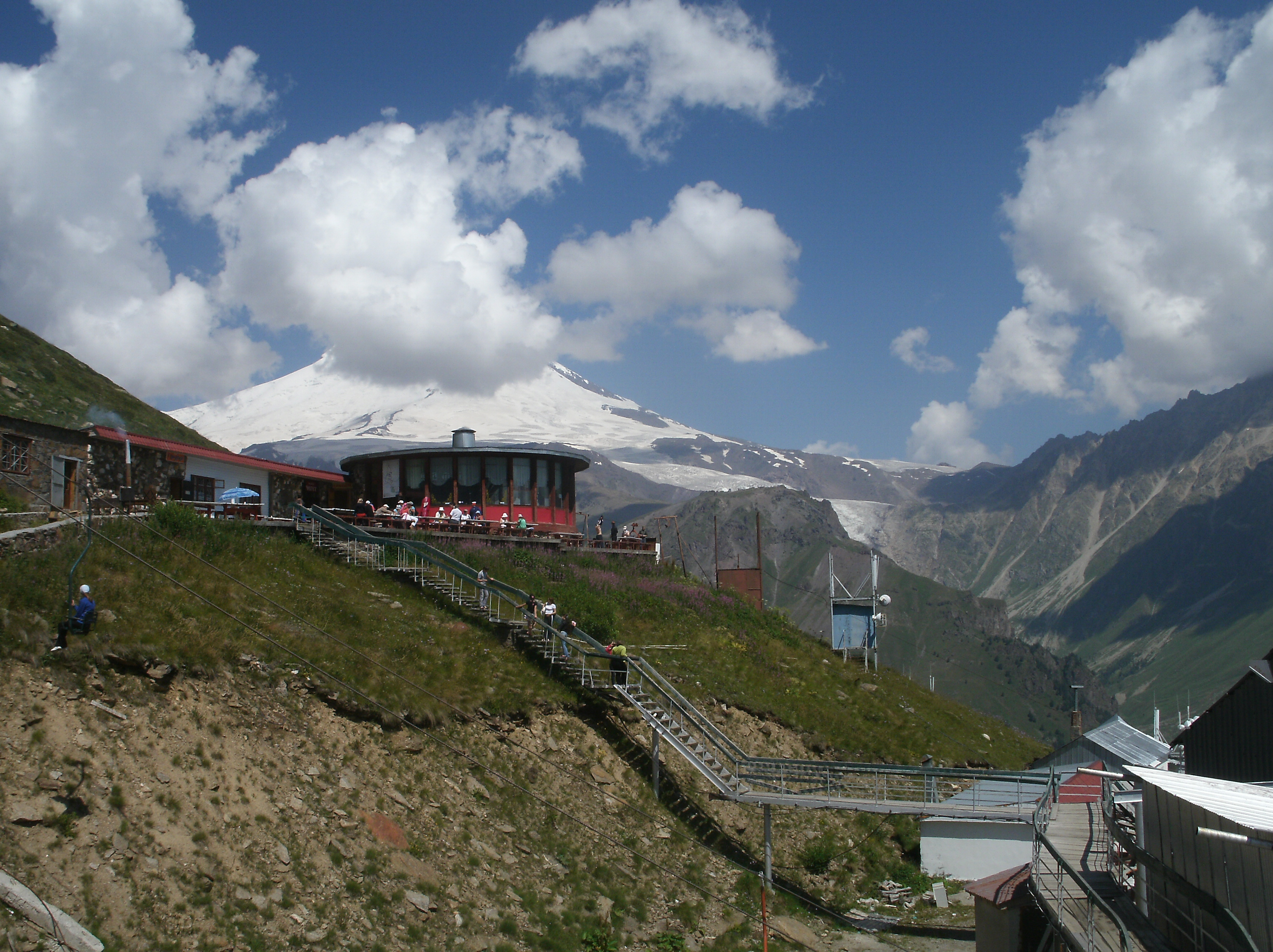
Visitor Cafe and Viewpoint to Mount Elbrus, above the Baksan River valley

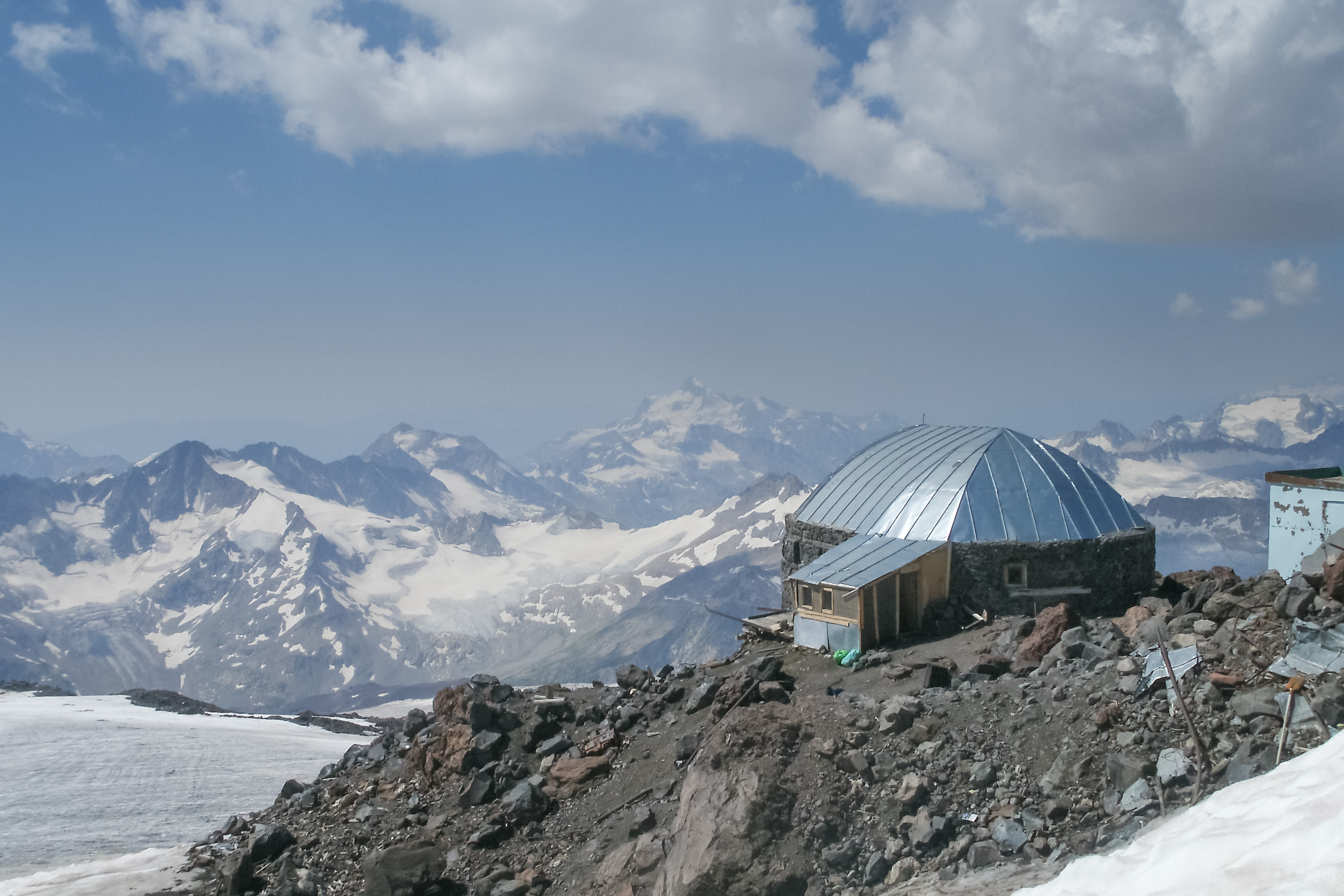
Shelter 11 on Mount Elbrus

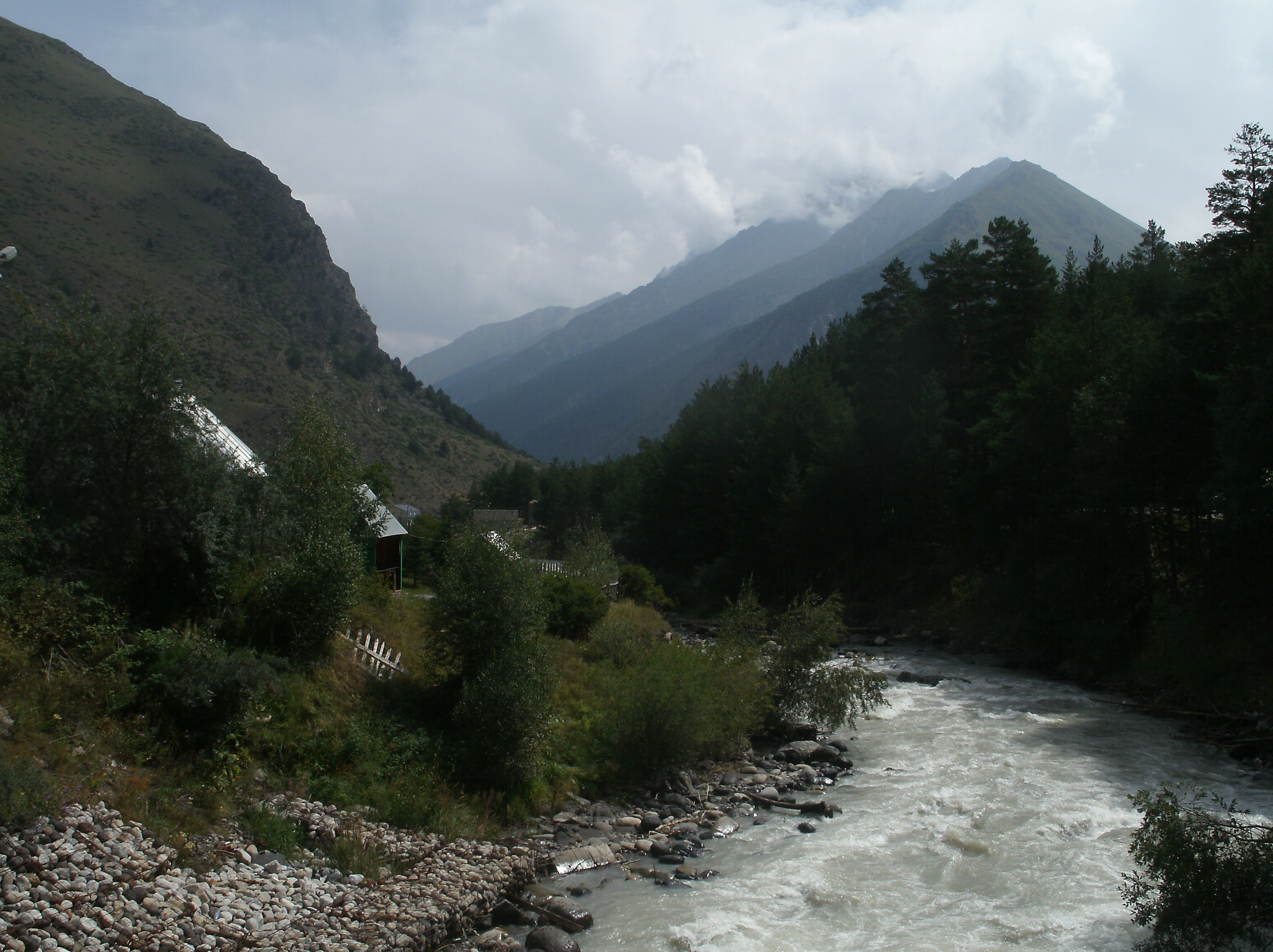
Baksan River valley

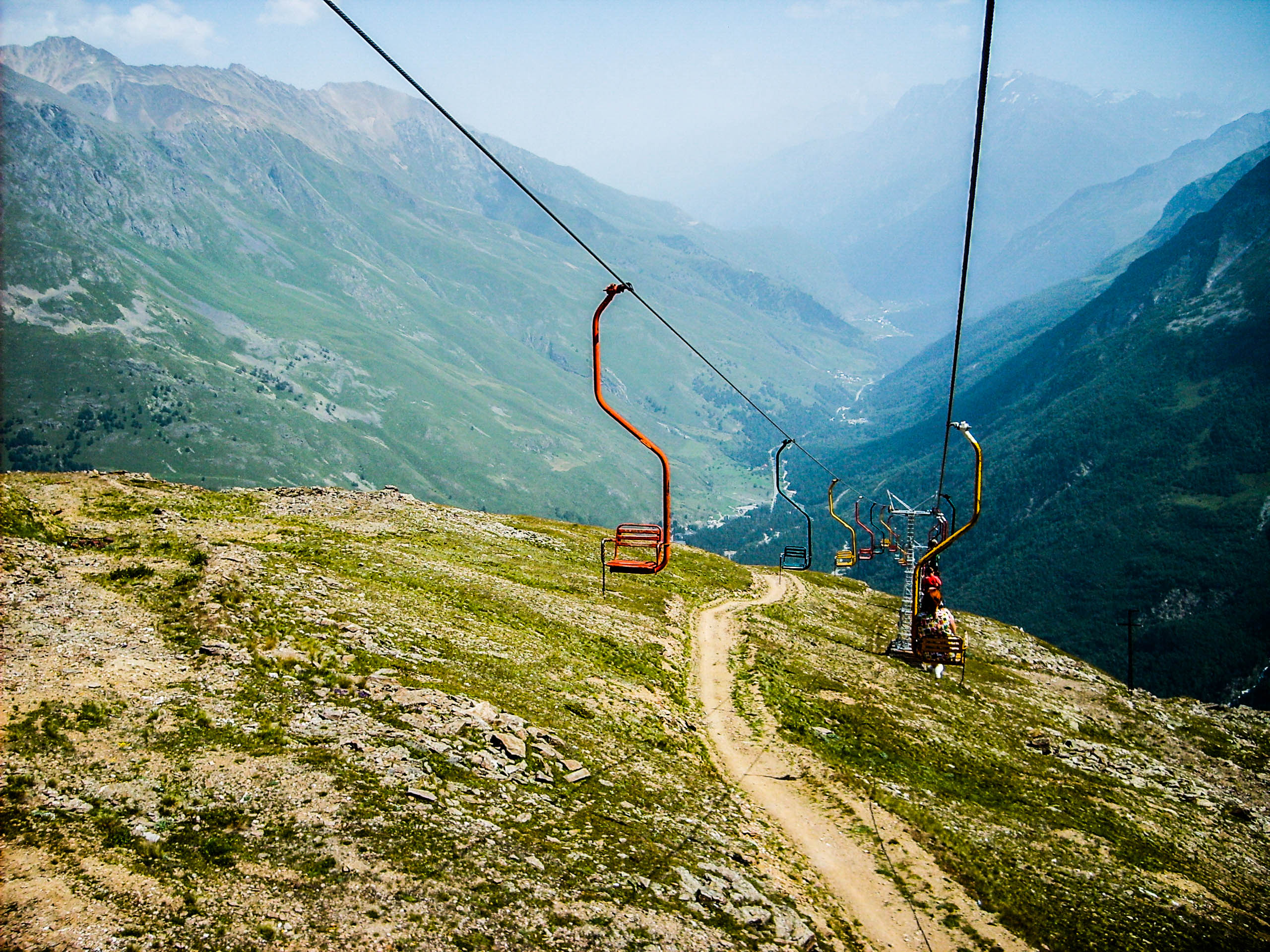
Cableway in the Elbrus region

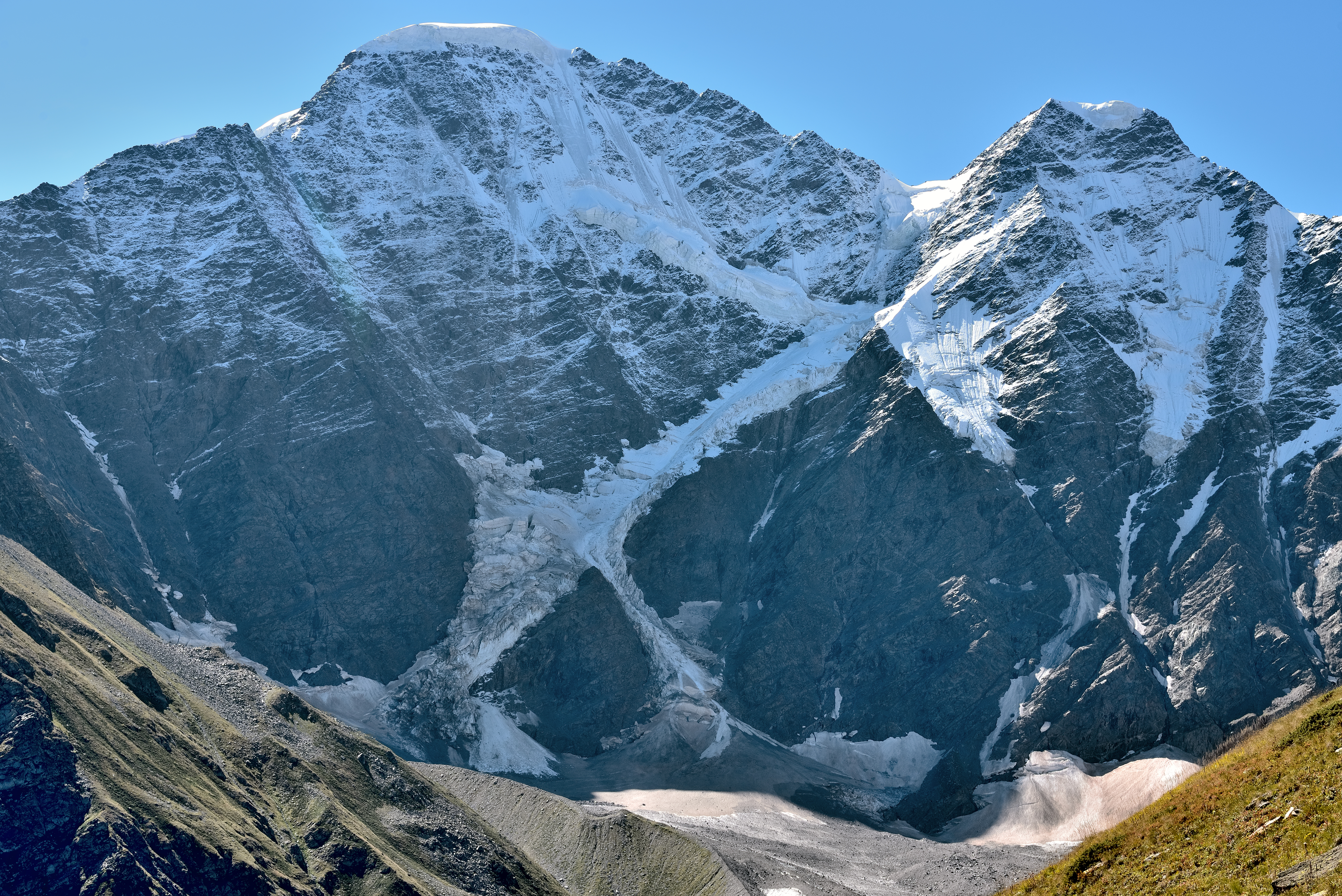
Mt. Donguzorun with glacier at the bottom

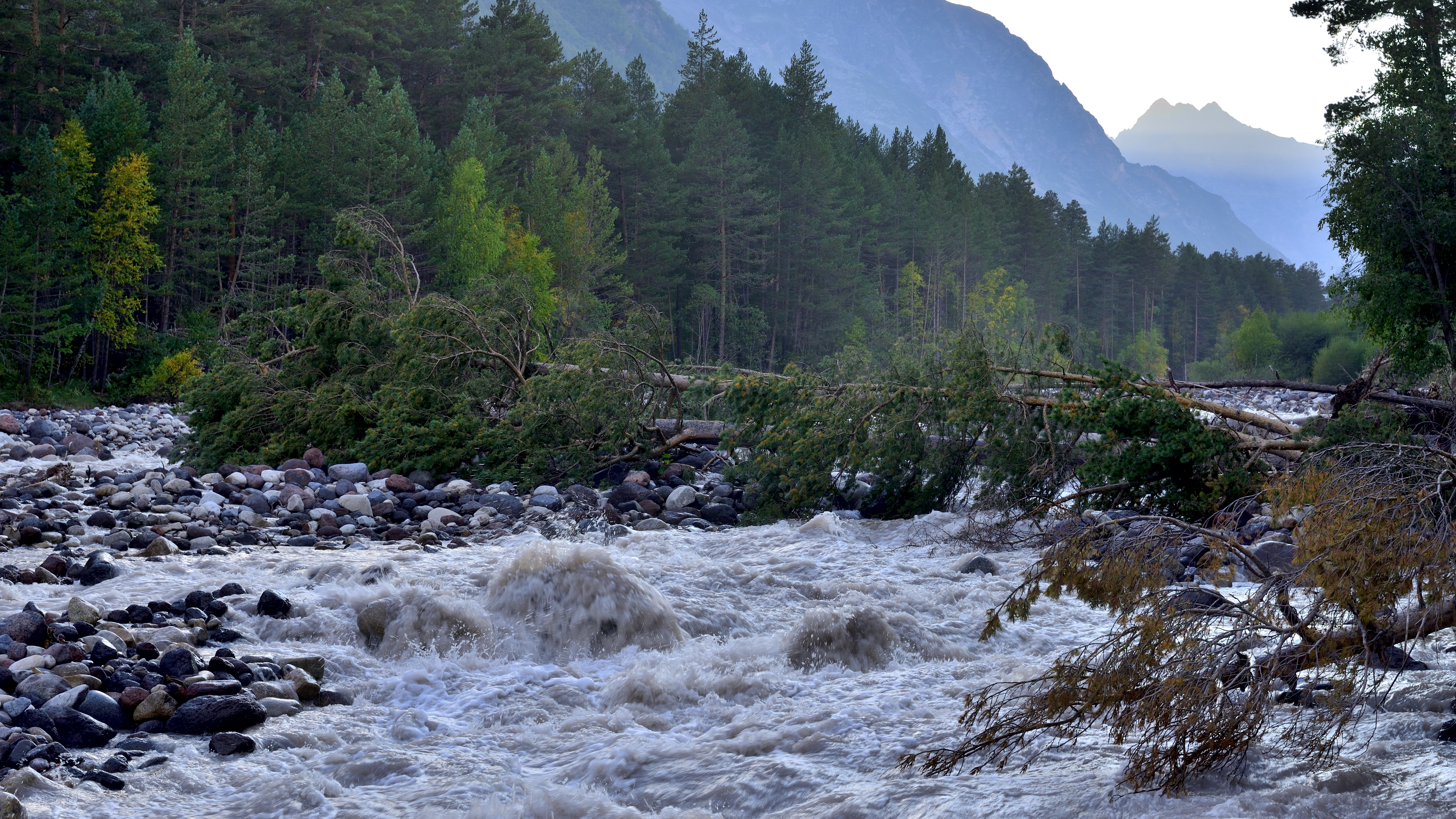
Stormy Baksan

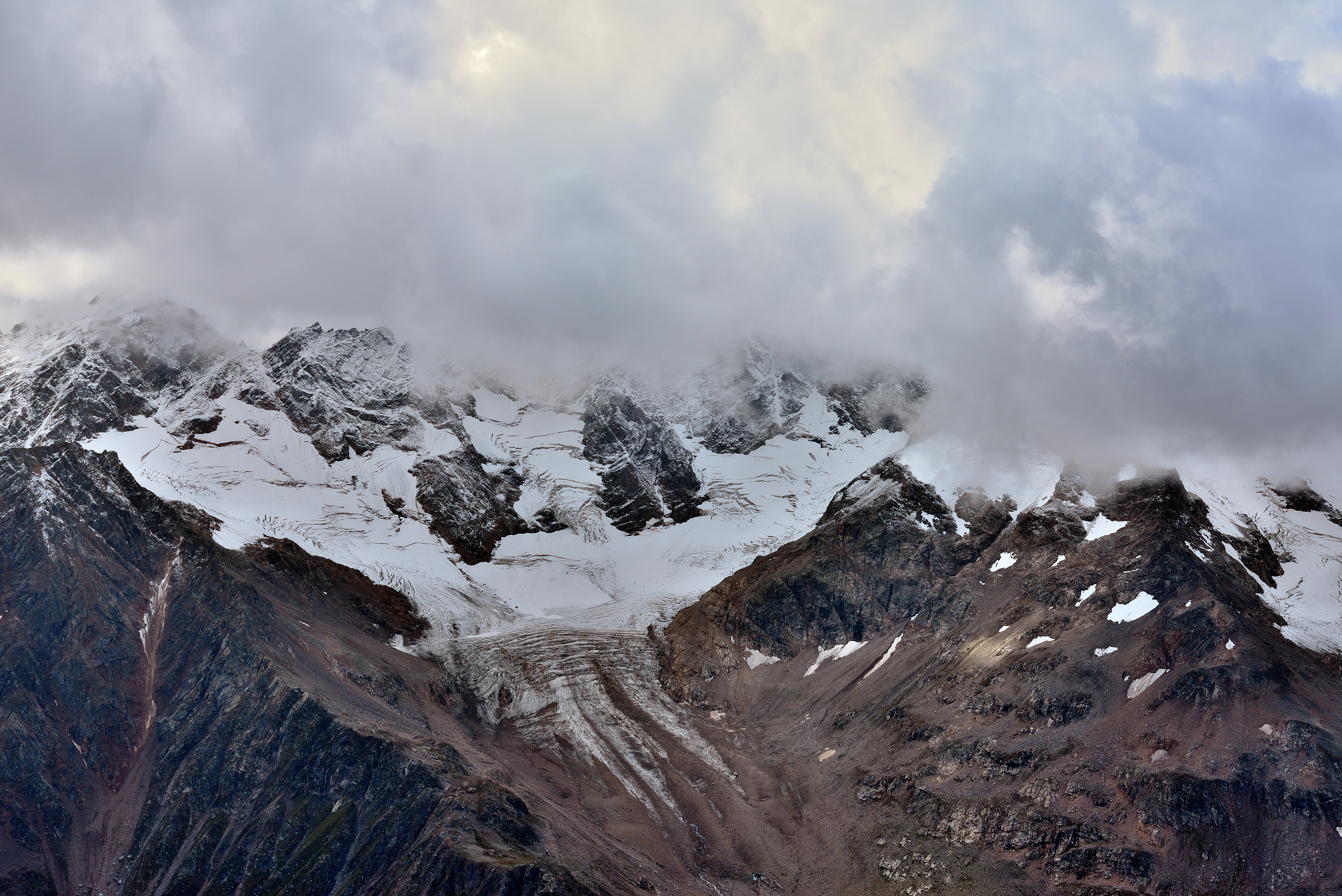
Chegetkara Glacier

== See also ==
- Protected areas of Russia
- National parks of Russia
- Nature Reserves of Russia (zapovedniks)
