= Aiguille du Midi =

Mountain in the French Alps

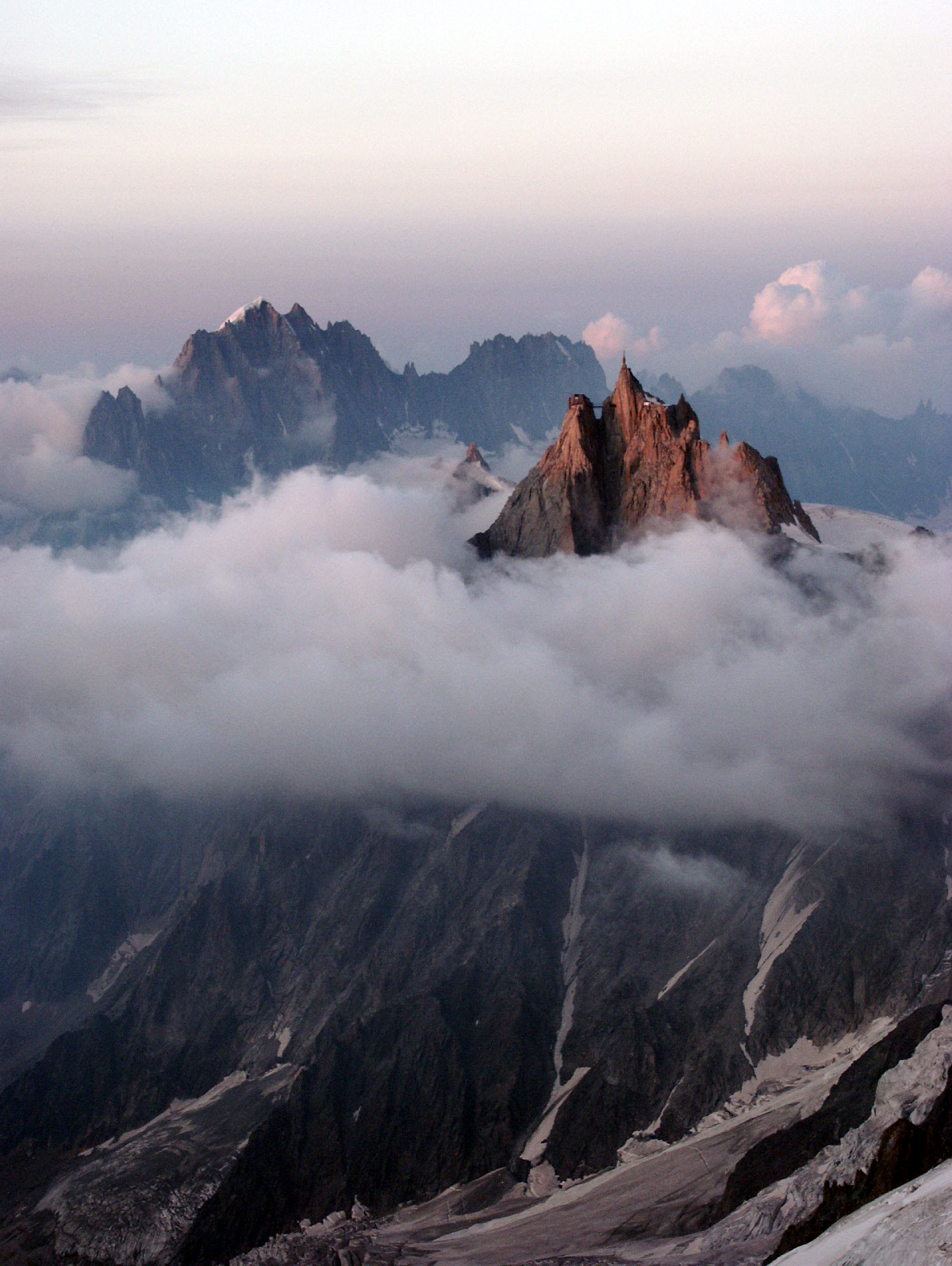
- The Aiguille du Midi in summer

Highest point
- Elevation: 3,842 m (12,605 ft)
- Prominence: 310 m (1,020 ft)
- Isolation: 1.72 km (1.07 mi)
- Listing: Alpine mountains above 3000 m
- Coordinates: 45°52′43″N 06°53′14″E

Naming
- Language of name: French

Geography
- Location within France
- Location: Haute-Savoie, Rhône-Alpes, France
- Parent range: Mont Blanc Massif

Geology
- Rock age: Tertiary
- Mountain type: Granite

Climbing
- First ascent: 4 August 1818 by Antoni Malczewski, J. M. Balmat and 5 guides

The Aiguille du Midi (French pronunciation: [eɡɥij dy midi], "Needle of the Mid-day") is a 3,842-metre-tall (12,605 ft) mountain in the Mont Blanc massif within the French Alps. It is a popular tourist destination and can be directly accessed by cable car from Chamonix that takes visitors close to Mont Blanc.

== Cable car ==
The idea for a cable car to the summit, the Téléphérique de l'Aiguille du Midi, was originally proposed around 1909, but did not come into operation until 1955, when it held the title of the world's highest cable car for about two decades. It still holds the record as the highest vertical ascent cable car in the world, from 1,035 to 3,842 m (3,396 to 12,605 ft). There are two sections: from Chamonix to Plan de l'Aiguille at 2,317 m (7,602 ft) and then directly, without any support pillar, to the upper station at 3,777 m (the building contains an elevator to the summit).

The span of the second section is 2,867 m (1.781 mi) measured directly, but only 2,500 m (1.6 mi) measured horizontally. Thus, it remains the second longest span width, measured directly. The cable car travels from Chamonix to the top of the Aiguille du Midi – an altitude gain of over 2,800 m (9,200 ft) – in 20 minutes, costing around €75 for an adult ticket from Chamonix and back.

There is access by cable car to a nearby peak on the Italian side, called Skyway Monte Bianco, with a vertical lift of 2,166 m, and a cable car from that peak to Aiguille du Midi. This is only open in the summer.

== Summit ==
At the mountain's summit, there is a panoramic viewing platform, a snack bar, a café, a restaurant, and a gift shop. Even in summer, temperatures in the open viewing areas can fall to −10 °C (14 °F), and visitors require both warm clothing and protection from very bright sunlight. Because of the danger, tourists are unable to leave the visitor facilities on the Midi's summit. However, mountaineers and skiers can pass through a tunnel to reach the steep and extremely exposed ice ridge to descend to the glacier below.

In December 2013, a glass skywalk called "Step into the Void" opened at the top of the Aiguille du Midi peak. The view is 1,035 m (3,396 ft) straight down, and one can see Mont Blanc to the south. A further tourist attraction called "Le Tube" opened in 2016. It consists of an enclosed tubular walkway that completely circles the summit.

During summer months only, the Vallée Blanche Cable Car crosses "peak-to-peak" from Aiguille du Midi to Pointe Helbronner (3,462 m (11,358 ft)) at the Italian side of the Mont Blanc Massif. Pointe Helbronner is served by another cable car, Skyway Monte Bianco, to Entrèves, near the Italian town of Courmayeur in the Aosta Valley. This makes it possible to travel "by air" from Chamonix, France to Courmayeur, Italy – a route normally traversed by the highway running through the Mont Blanc Tunnel.

== Mountaineering ==
Several routes for fit, experienced mountaineers can either start or finish at the Aiguille du Midi, although the nearby Cosmiques Refuge is the best starting point for the longer routes:

- Arête des Cosmiques (also known as the Cosmiques Ridge) is a short, mixed rock and ice route that can be reached from the Midi station and which returns there in an unusual manner, exiting from the top of a ladder onto the Midi station viewing platform. It is very popular, and therefore busy, and is often used as an alpine training climb as it requires all-around mountaineering skills. Graded at PD+ to AD, the round-trip can easily be completed from Chamonix in one day. First ascent by George and Maxwell Finched on 2 August 1911.
- Midi-Plan traverse traverse from the Aiguille du Midi to the Aiguille du Plan, either returning to the cable car or descending the Mer de Glace from the 'Plan' to the Requin Hut or continuing to Montenvers.
- Mont Blanc du Tacul Usually done from the Cosmiques Hut, but fit parties sometimes take the first-morning telepherique and descend from the 'Midi'. Alternatively, it can be combined with a return to the cable car station via an ascent of the Cosmiques ridge.
- The Traverse of Mont Blanc, also known in French as La Voie des Trois Mont Blancs or just La Traversée, is a long route, graded at PD+ which starts from the Cosmiques Hut. This popular route is less exposed to danger than the Gouter Route, but under certain conditions, both Mont Blanc du Tacul and Mont Maudit can develop slopes with very high avalanche risk.
- The Vallée Blanche ski run is a 20 km (12 miles) long, unmarked off-piste ski route which begins very steeply from the Aiguille du Midi station and, because of its complexity across crevassed glaciated terrain and needs for route-finding, is best undertaken with a mountain guide.

== Gallery ==
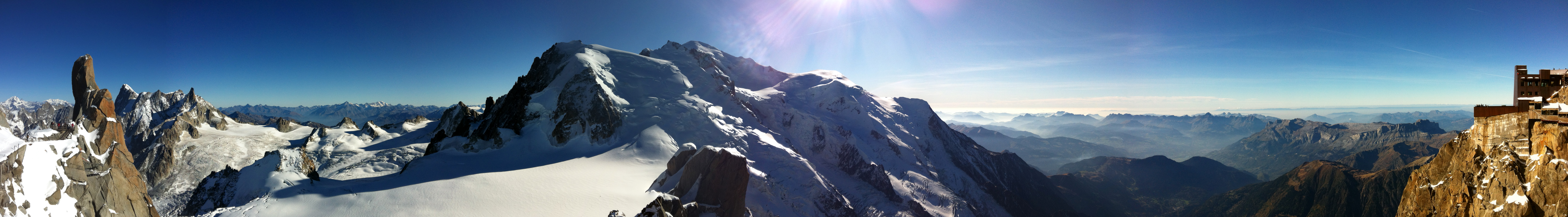
A panoramic view of Mont Blanc from Aiguille du Midi

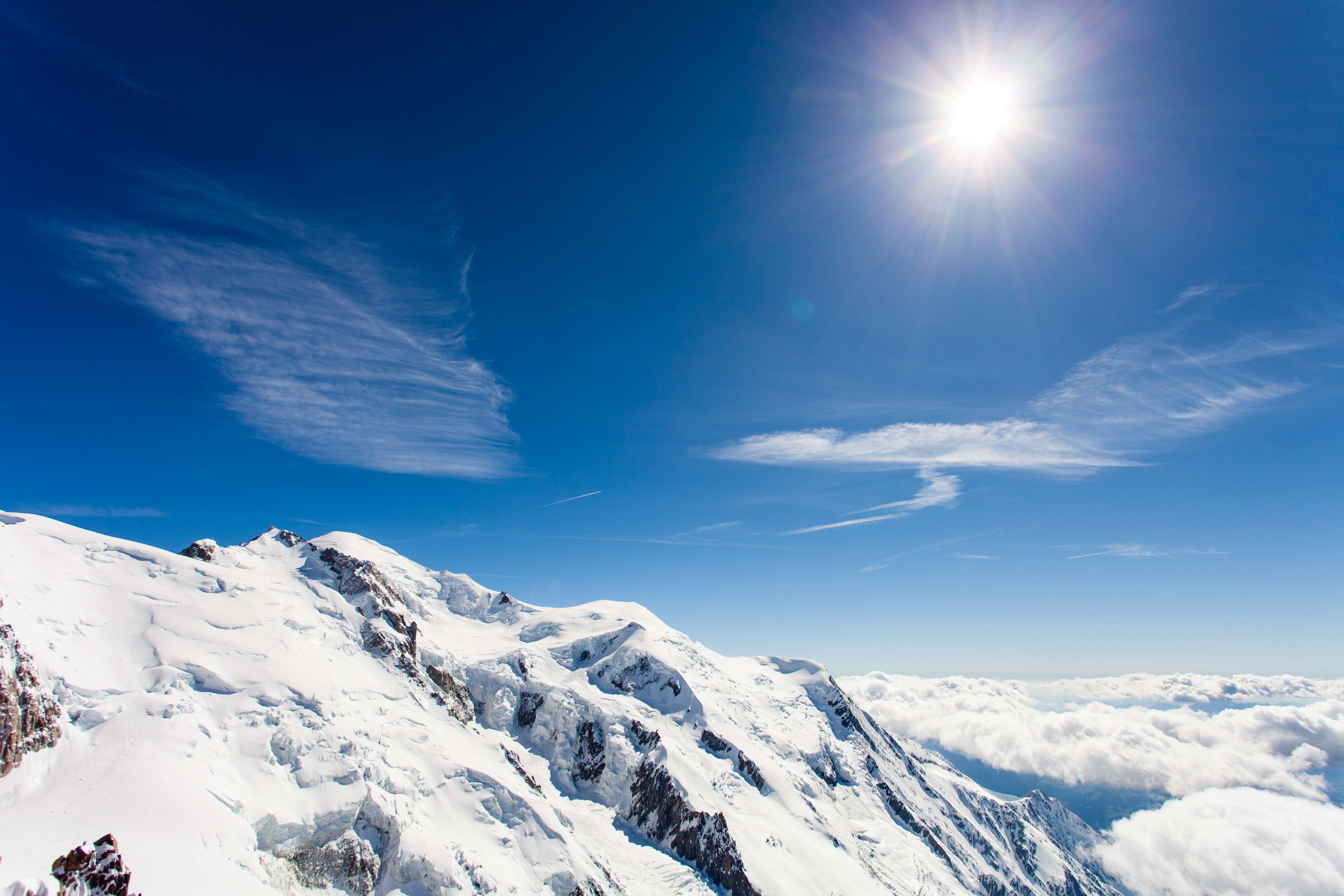
Mont Blanc View from L'Aguille du Midi

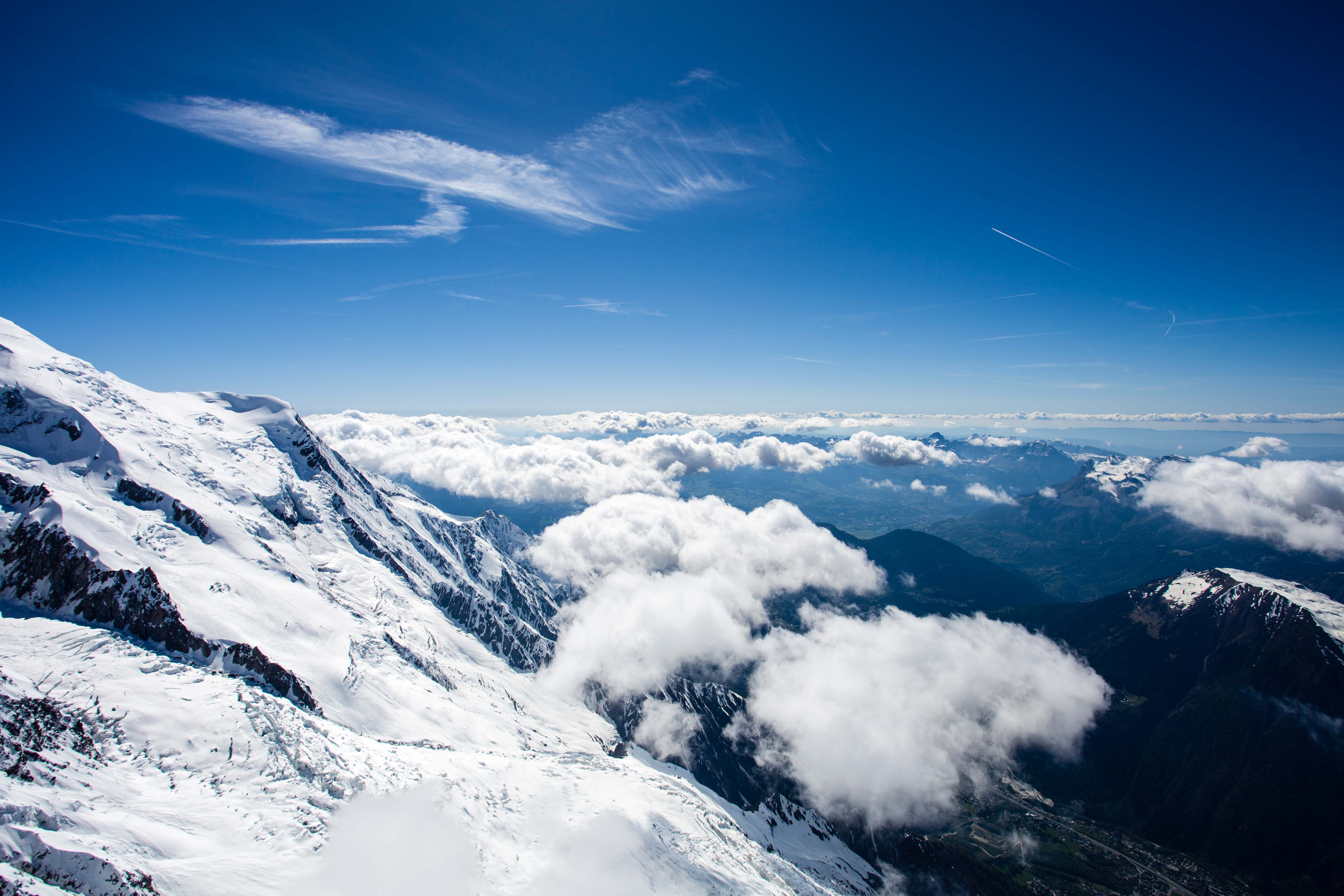
View over Les Houches

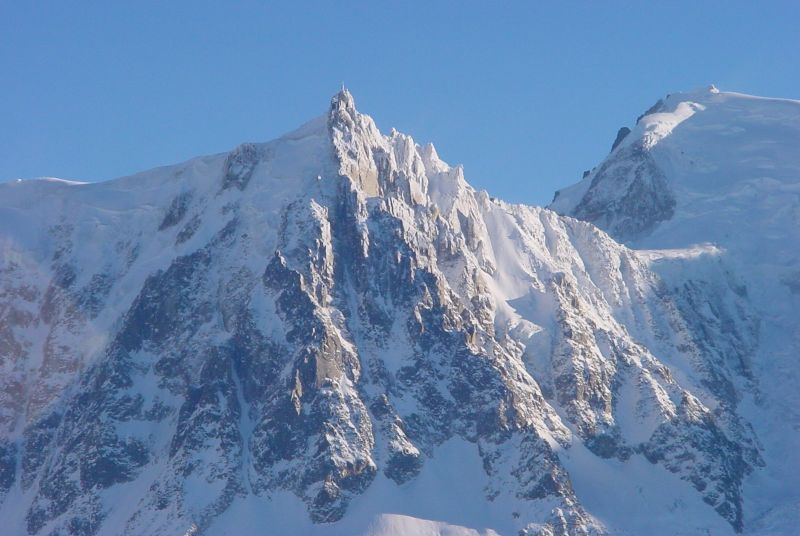
The north face in winter

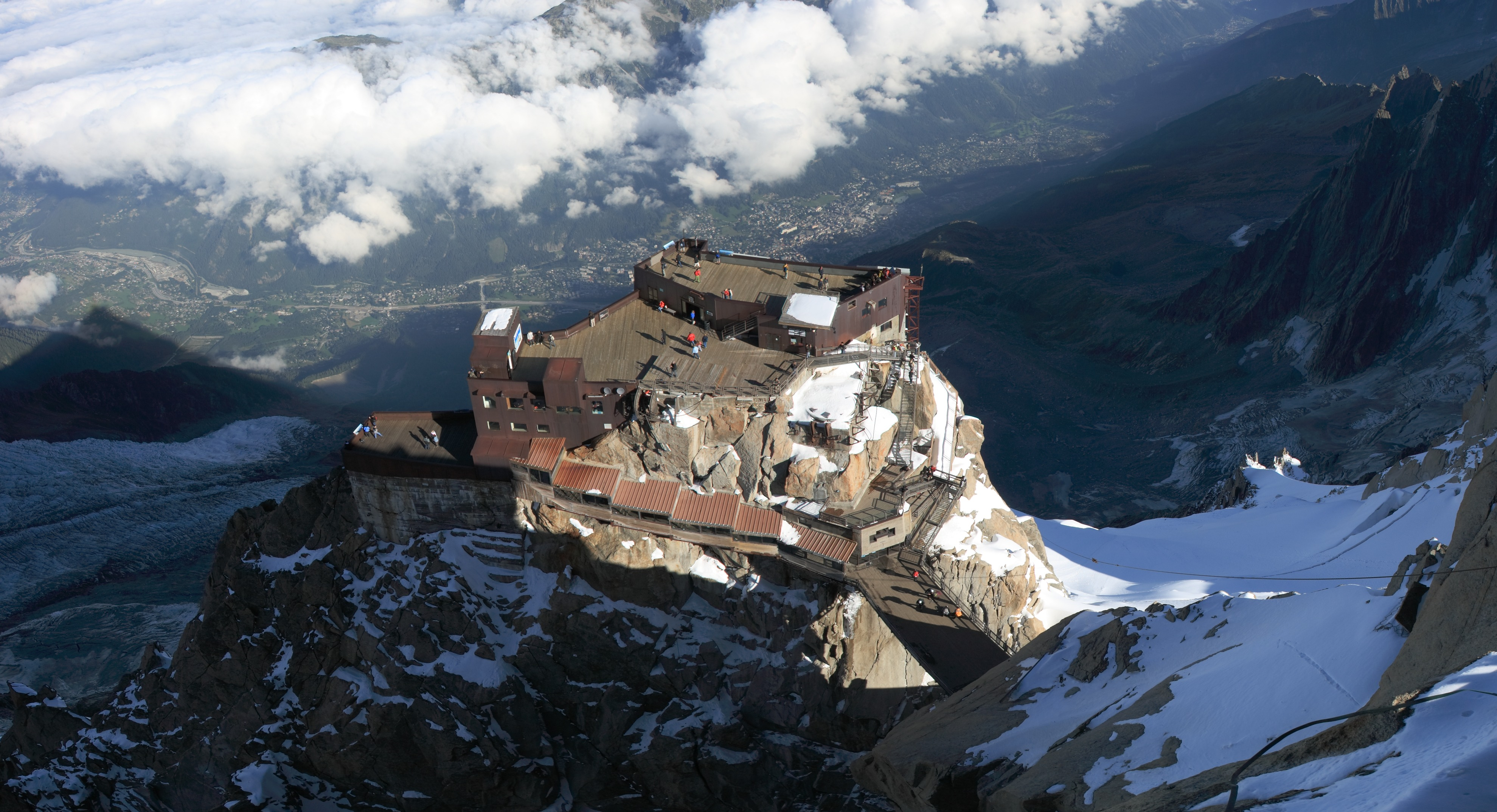
The lower platforms from the summit

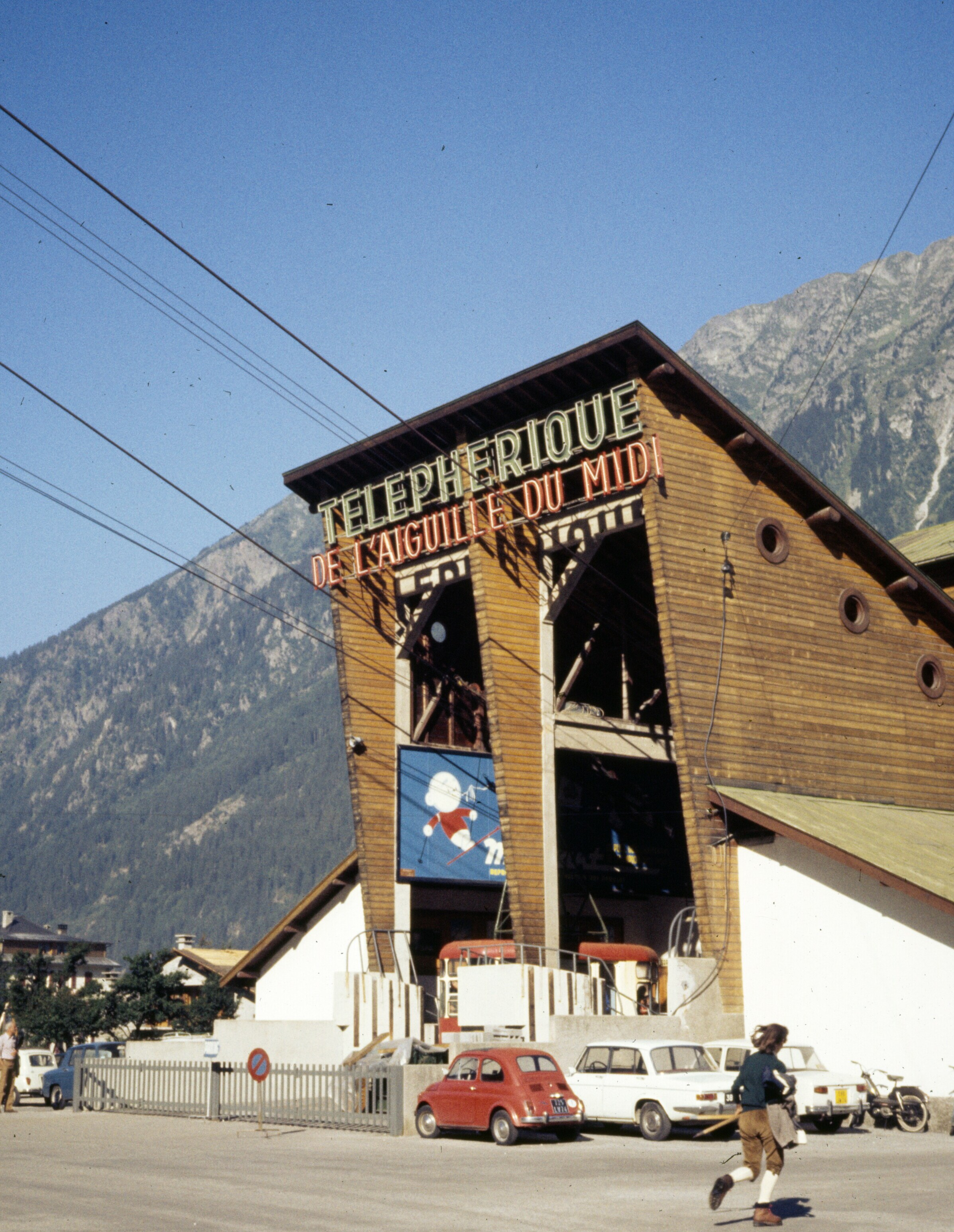
Cable car terminus (1972)

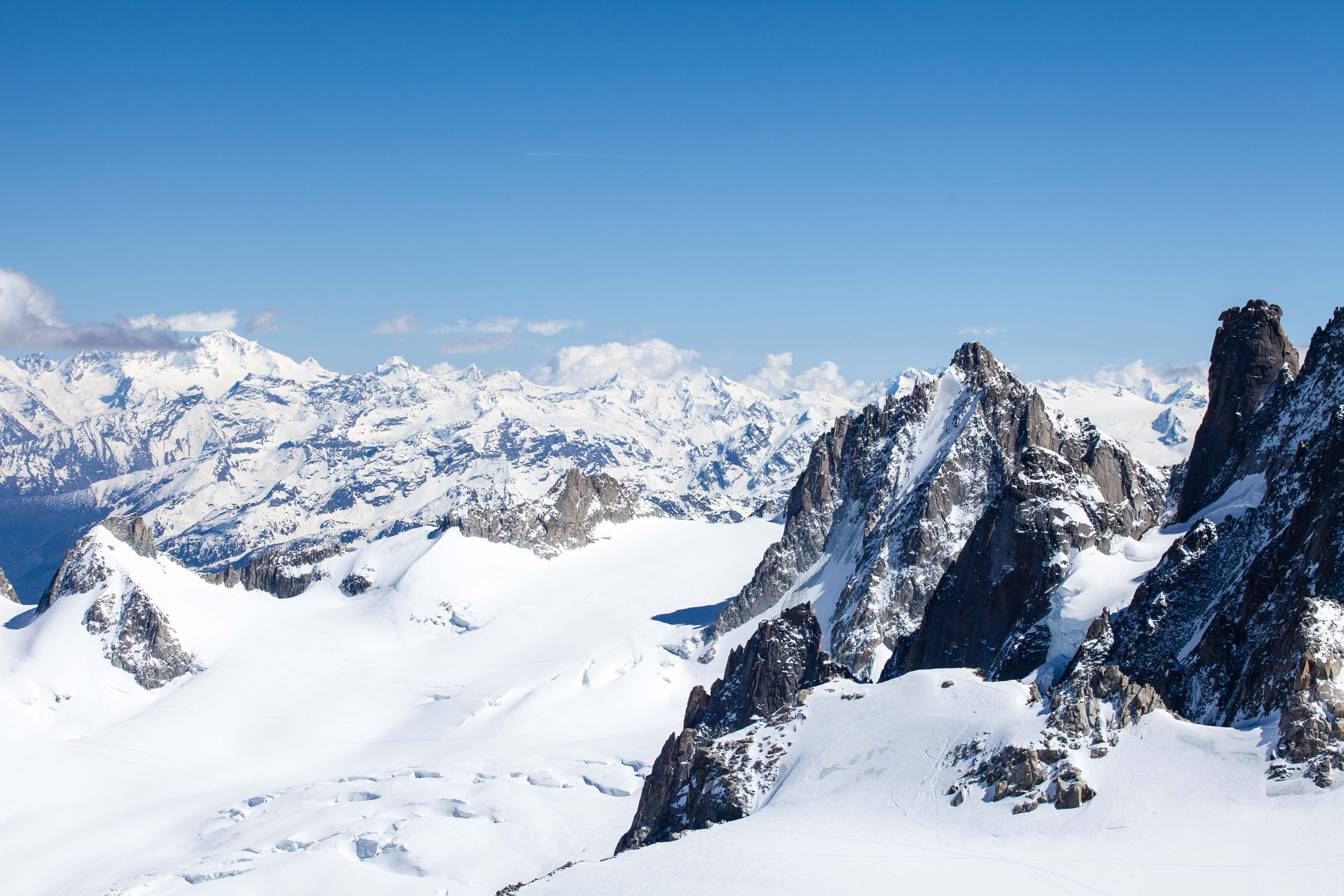
View over Italian Alps from L'Aguille du Midi

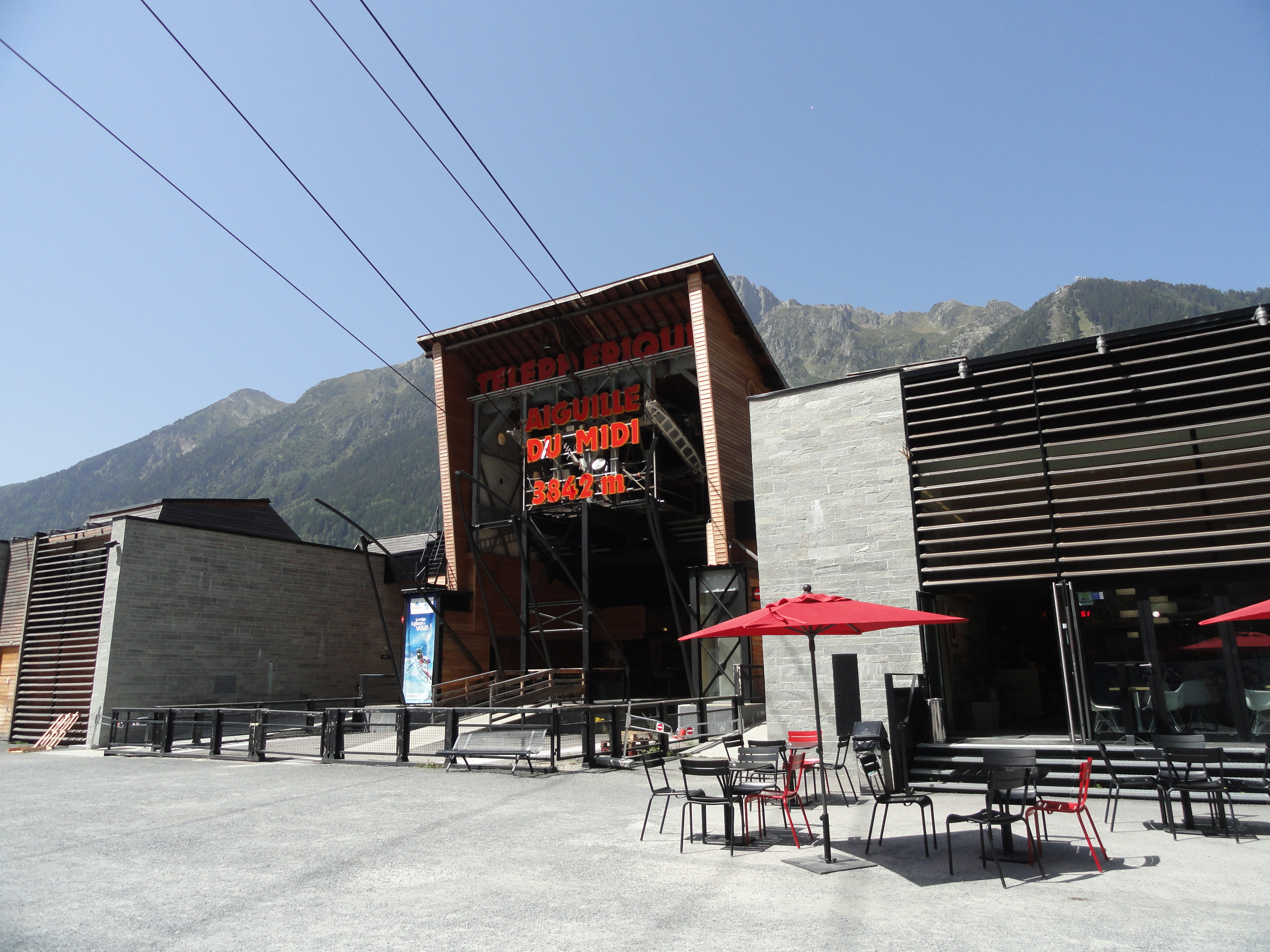
Cable car terminus (2011)

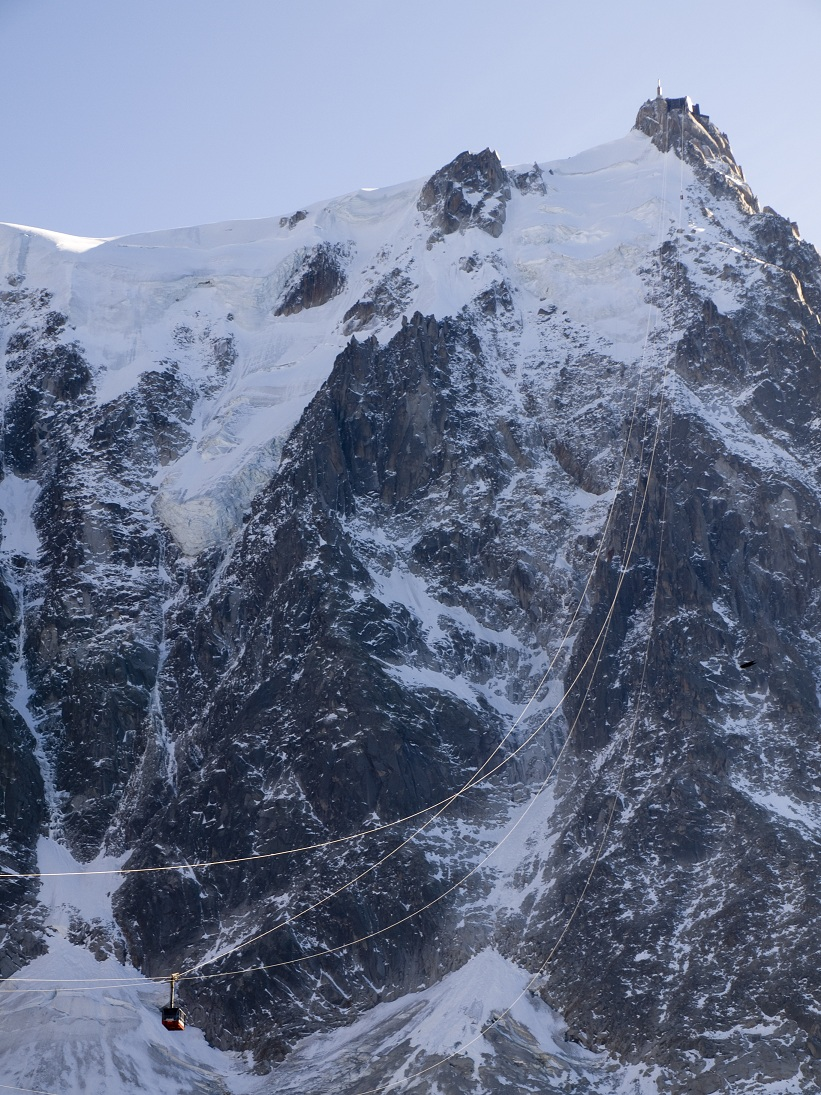
Cable car going to Aiguille du Midi

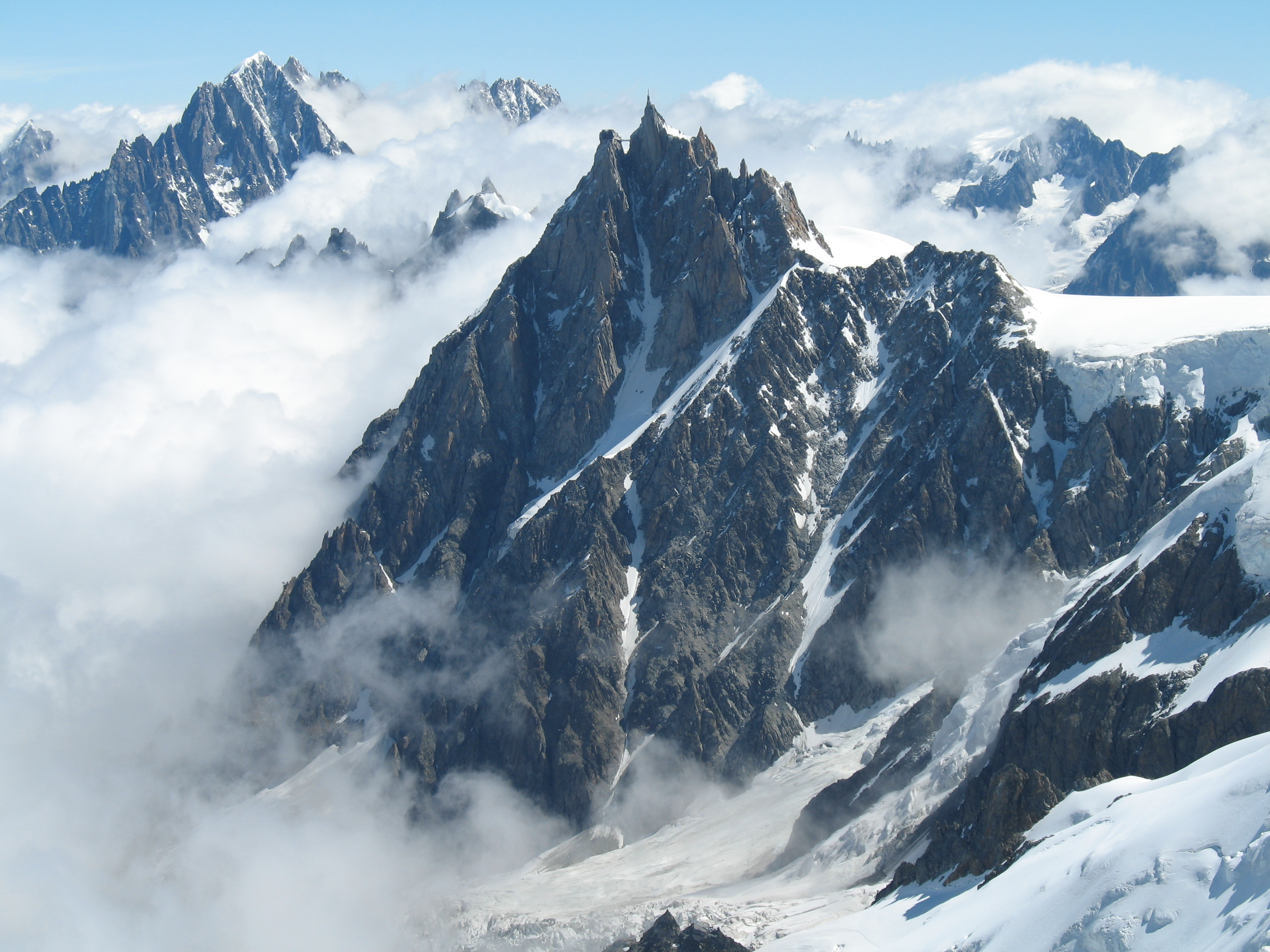

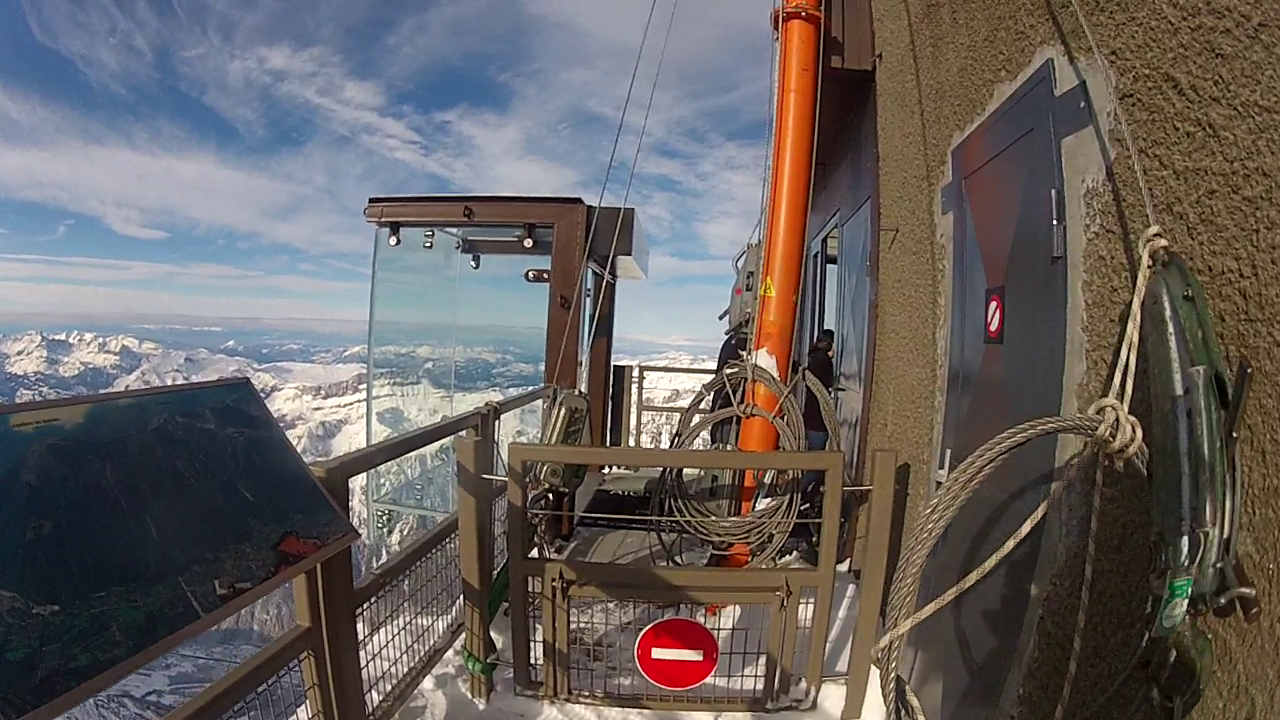
Skywalk, December 27, 2013

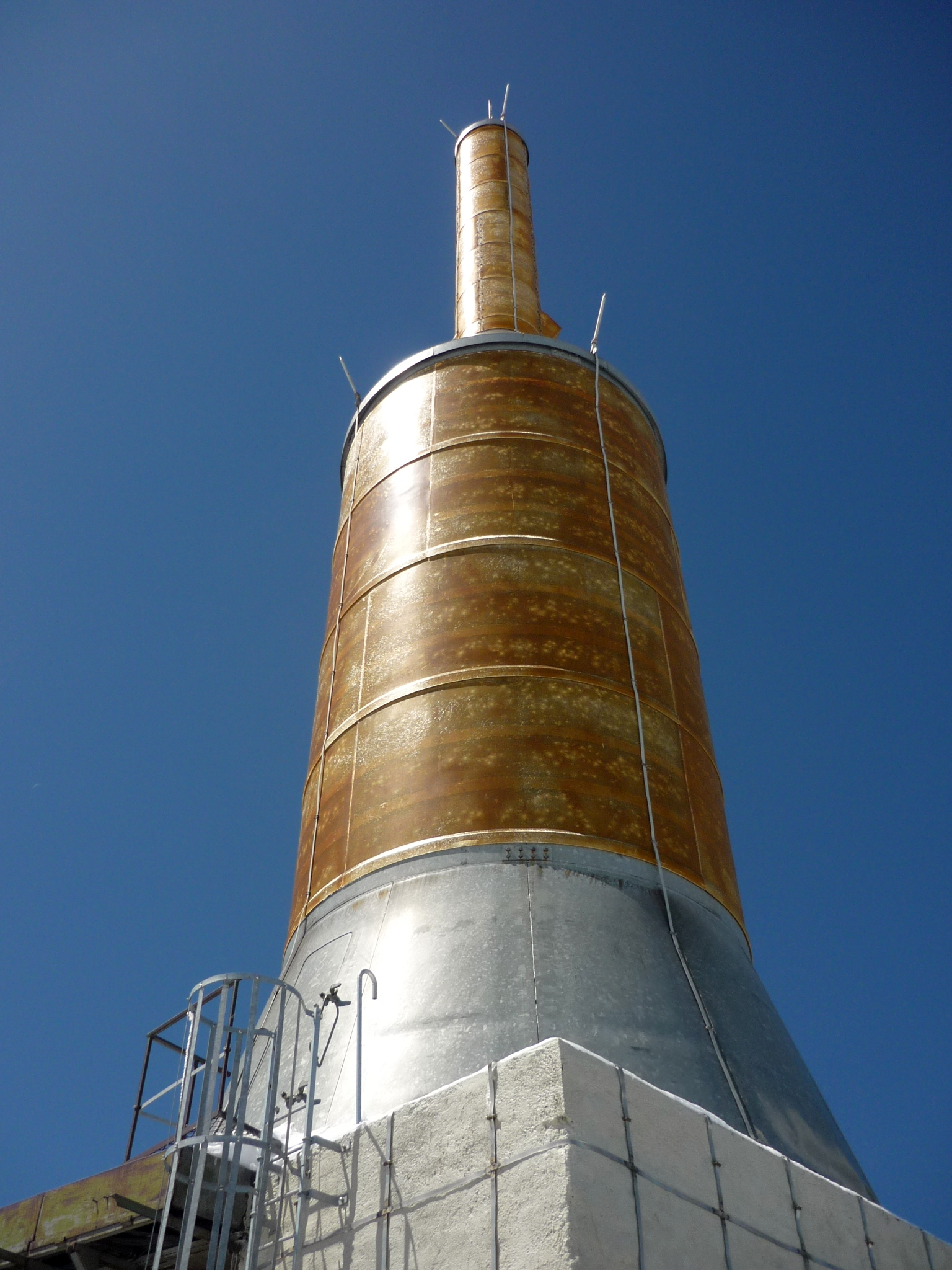
Summit antenna on Aiguille du Midi

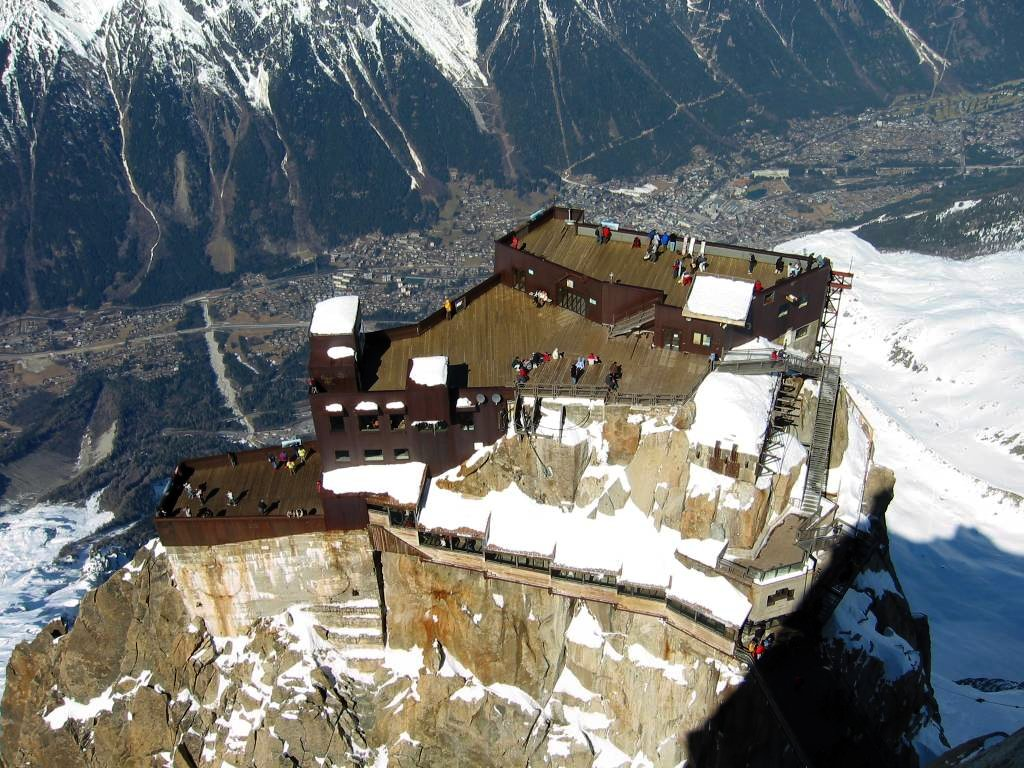
Lower terraces of Aiguille du Midi seen from the top with Chamonix below. March 2007

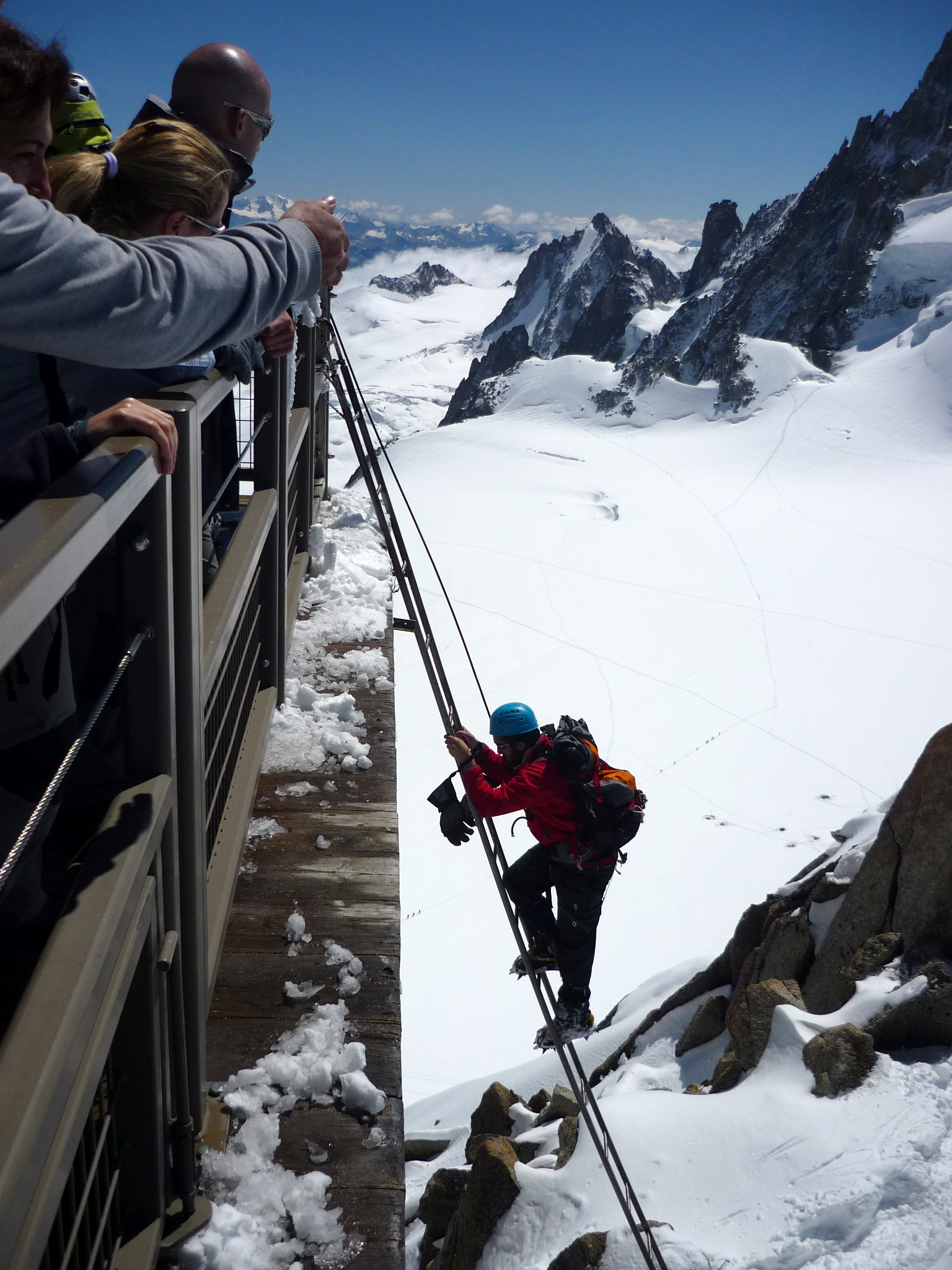
Alpine climbers on the Cosmiques Ridge use a metal ladder to regain access to the 'Midi station'

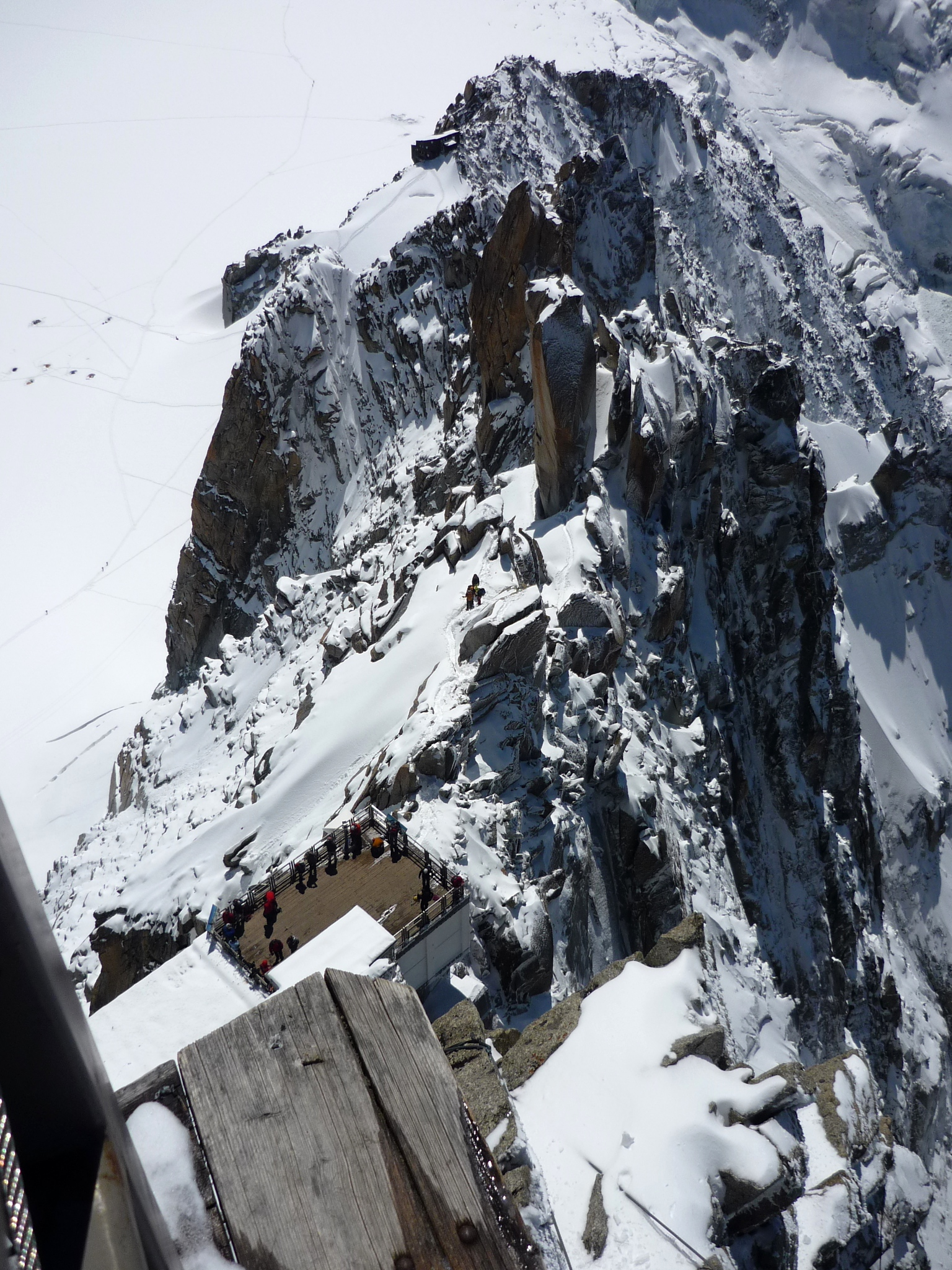
View along the Cosmiques Ridge toward Refuge des Cosmiques

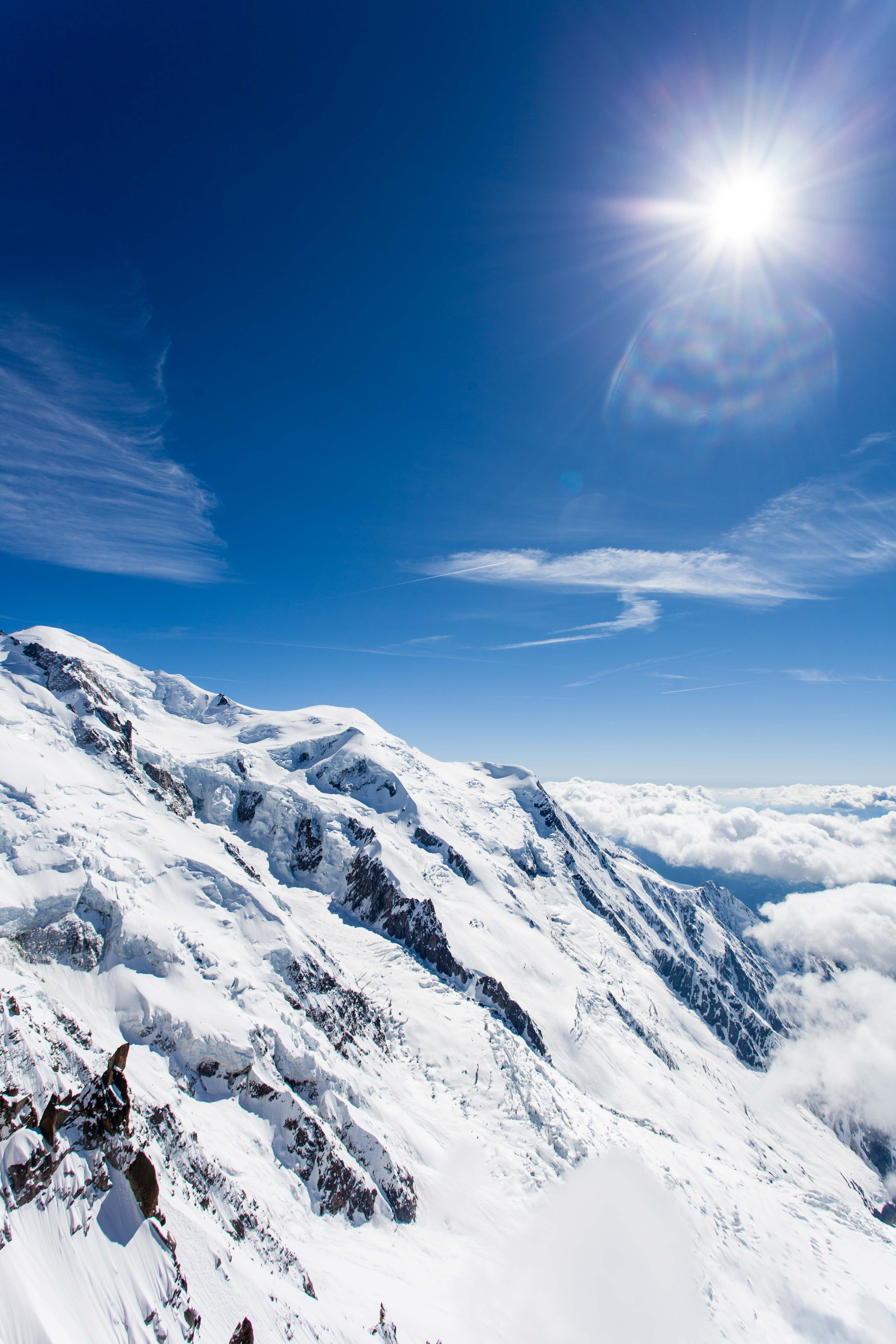
Mont Blanc view from L'Aguille du Midi

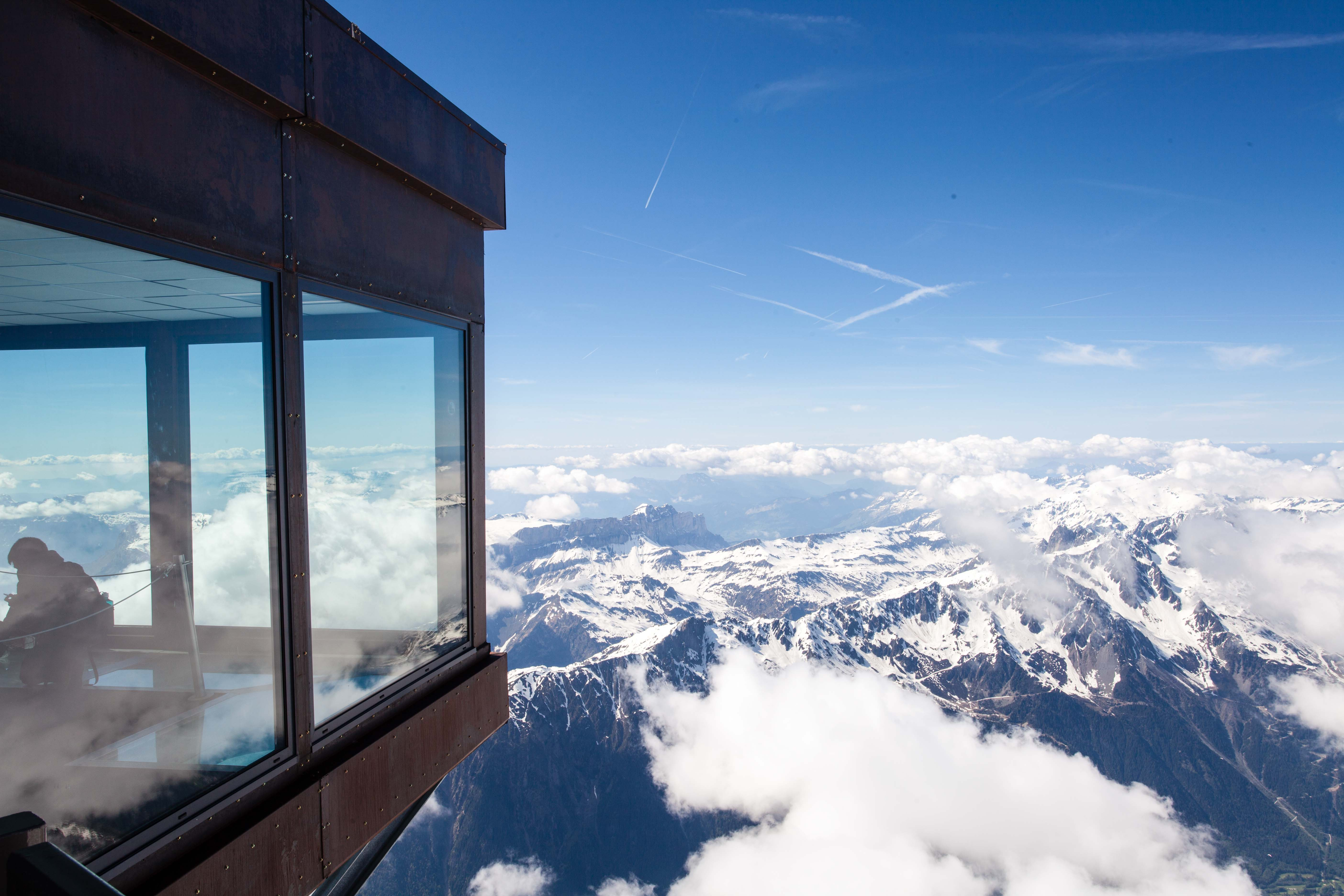
Panoramic view over the Alps from L'Aguille du Midi

== See also ==
- List of mountains of the Alps above 3000 m
