= Cosmiques Hut =

Mountain hut in the Mont Blanc massif

Coordinates: 45°52′23″N 6°53′8″E

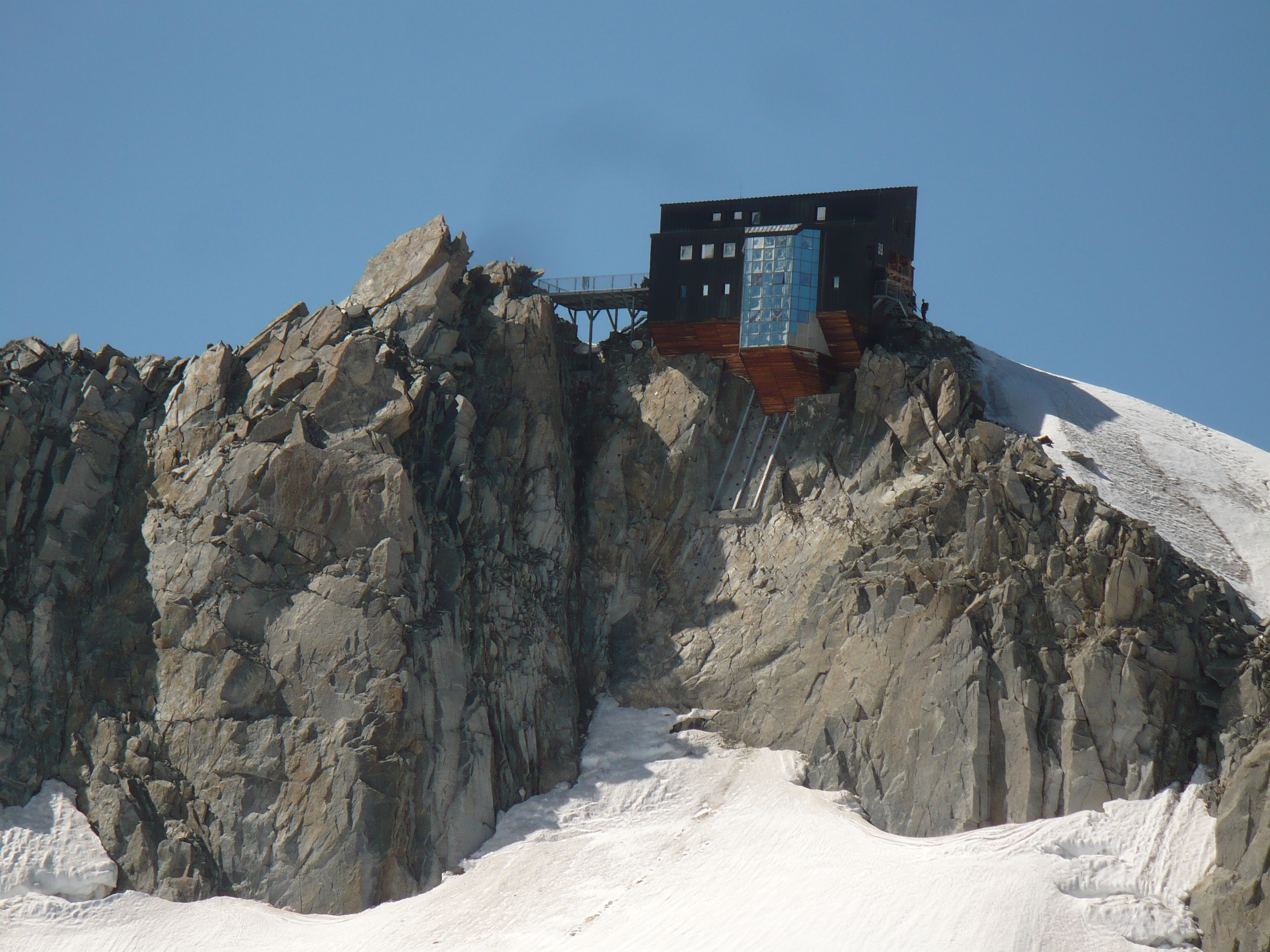
Cosmiques Hut

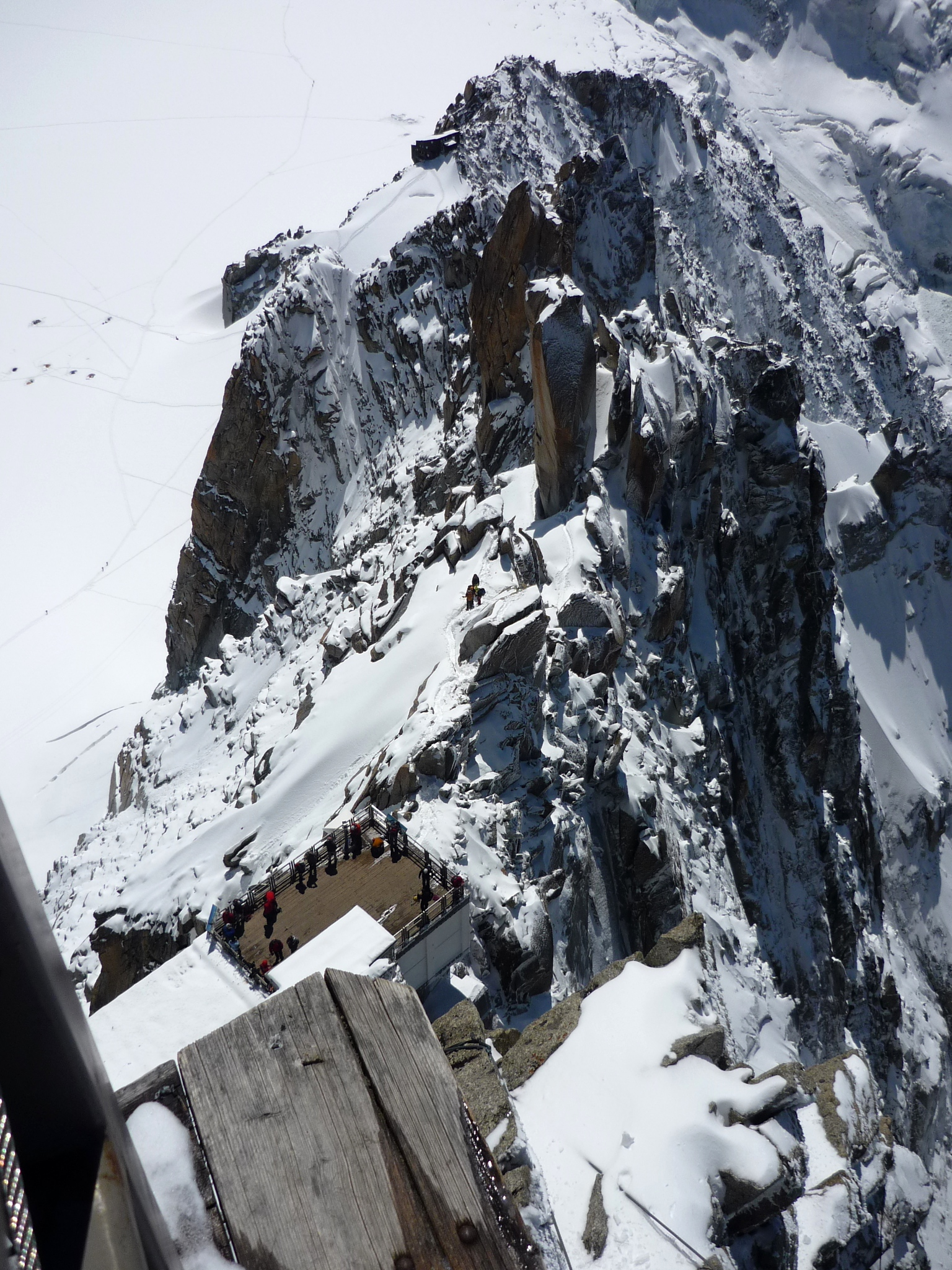
View from Aiguille du Midi showing position of Cosmiques Hut

The Cosmiques Hut (French: Refuge des Cosmiques) is a mountain hut in the Mont Blanc massif in the French Alps at an altitude of 3,613 m (11,854 ft). It is a large structure capable of accommodating 148 mountaineers. It was constructed in 1990 on a rock promontory situated between the Col du Midi and the base of the Cosmiques Arête which descends southwards from the Aiguille du Midi. It gives access to a number of classic alpine mountaineering routes, and has proved to be extremely popular with mountaineers, so much so that in the summer months prior booking a few days beforehand is essential in order to secure a bed. The Hut is wardened between mid-February and mid-October. In winter the nearby Abri Simond Hut is left unlocked, although this has no cooking facilities, heating or water.

== Access ==
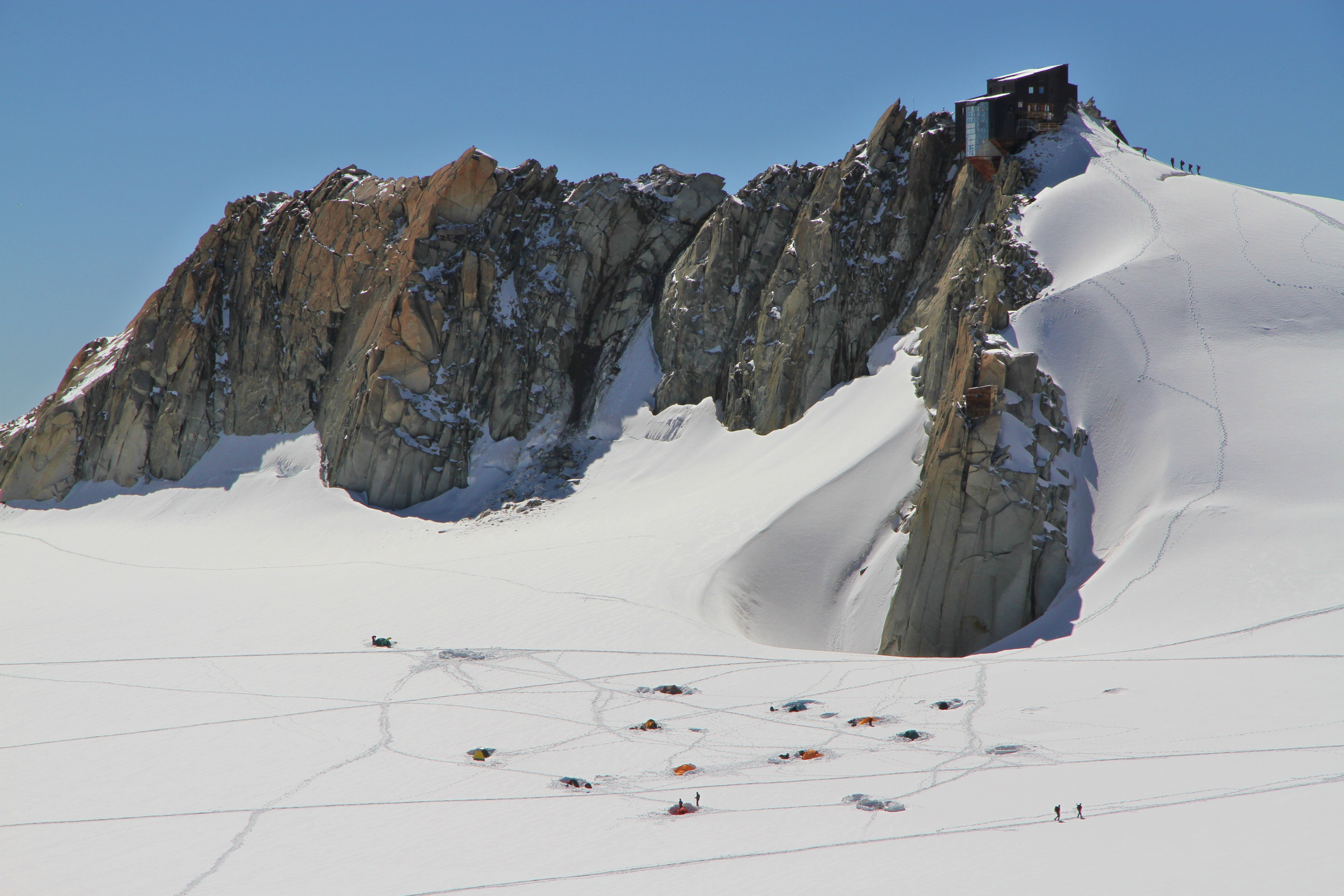
Cosmiques Hut with mountaineers illegally camping on the Vallee Blanche below, 2010 July

The Cosmiques Hut is most easily reached from the Aiguille du Midi, which itself is most easily reached via the telepherique (an aerial tramway) from Chamonix. The initial descent for skiers and mountaineers leaving the Midi cable-car station can be very intimidating on account of its considerable exposure. It has been described as "one of the most crowded and infamous passages of snow arête in the Alps, much feared by off-piste skiers and novice alpinists alike." The descent from the Midi station and glacier path to reach the Cosmiques Hut takes approximately 45 minutes, and is graded at PD-. Use of the hut is encouraged because authorities have said anyone caught climbing Mont Blanc without a shelter booking or wild camping on the mountain will face up to two years in prison and a $335,000 fine.

From the Col du Géant and Pointe Helbronner/Torino Hut the Cosmiques Hut can be reach by a complicated and lengthy passage through the broad and crevassed expanse of the Géant Glacier and then across the upper reaches of the Vallee Blanche. In summer there is usually a clear track in the snow showing the route other mountaineers have taken. Passage from the Torino Hut to the Cosmiques Hut is a distance of approximately 4 km (2.5 mi), normally taking about 2½ hours and is an easy glacier route, graded at F+.

== Ascents ==
Numerous mountaineering routes of all grades can be undertaken, using the Cosmiques Hut as a base. These include:

- The Cosmiques Ridge on the Aiguille du Midi (a mixed rock and ice training route), plus many others on the rock climbs on the granite of the 'Midi'.
- Training ice routes and mixed climbs on the North face of Mont Blanc du Tacul
- Many big routes on the East face of Mont Blanc du Tacul
- Kuffner Route on Mont Maudit (also known as the frontier ridge)
- Ascent of Mont Blanc via a traverse of Mont Blanc du Tacul and Mont Maudit.
