= Mont Maudit =

Mountain in the Mont Blanc massif

- Aerial view of Mont Maudit from the east

Highest point
- Elevation: 4,465 m (14,649 ft)
- Prominence: 162m ↓ Col de la Brenva
- Isolation: 1.9 km → Mont Blanc
- Coordinates: 45°50′52″N 6°52′33″E

Geography
- Location within Alps
- Location: Haute-Savoie, France / Courmayeur, Italy
- Parent range: Graian Alps

Geology
- Mountain type: Granite

Climbing
- First ascent: Henry Seymour Hoare and William Edward Davidson with guides Johann Jaun and Johann von Bergen on 12 September 1878
- Easiest route: North-east approach to north-west ridge (PD)

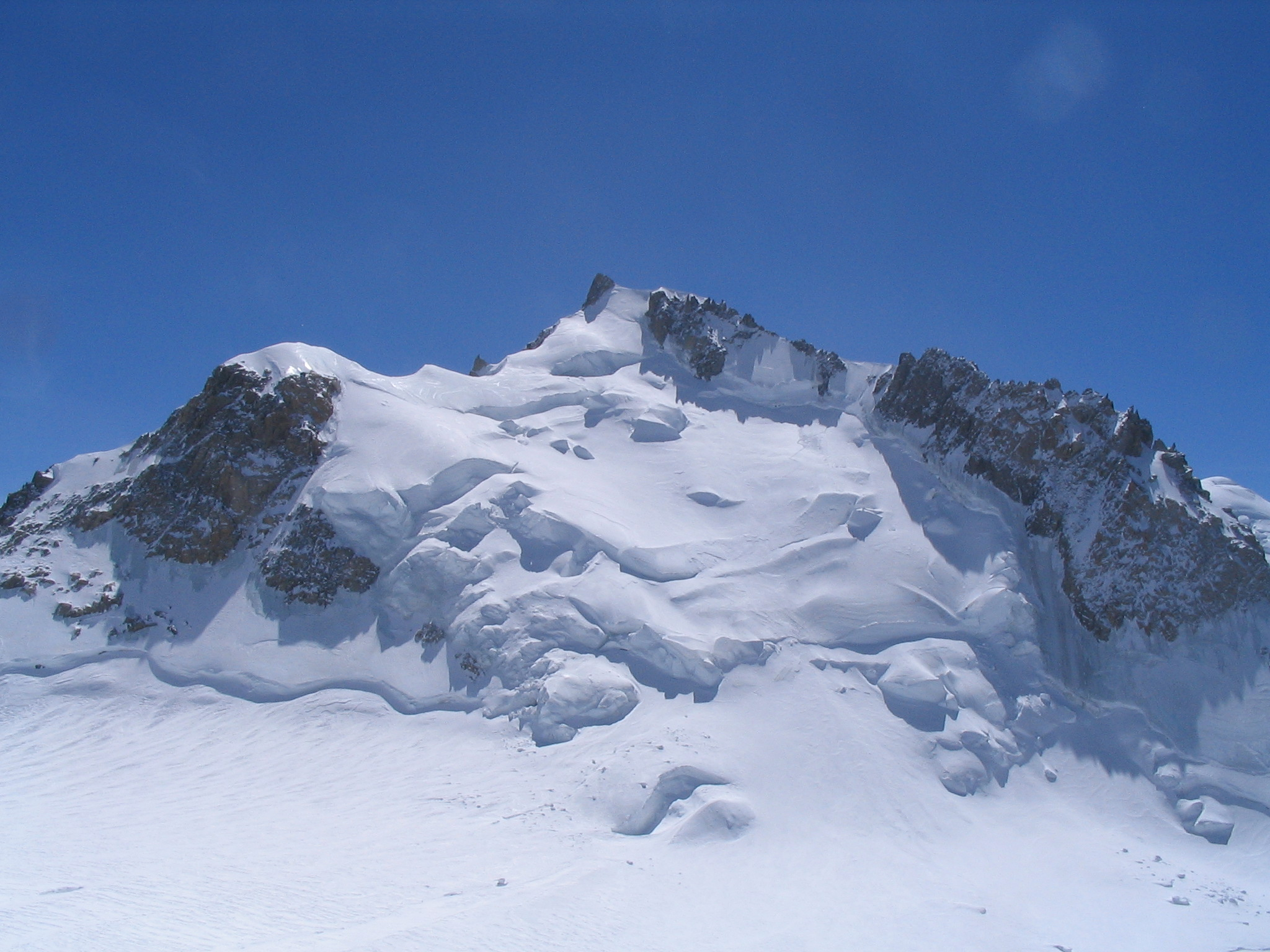
Mont Maudit from the north

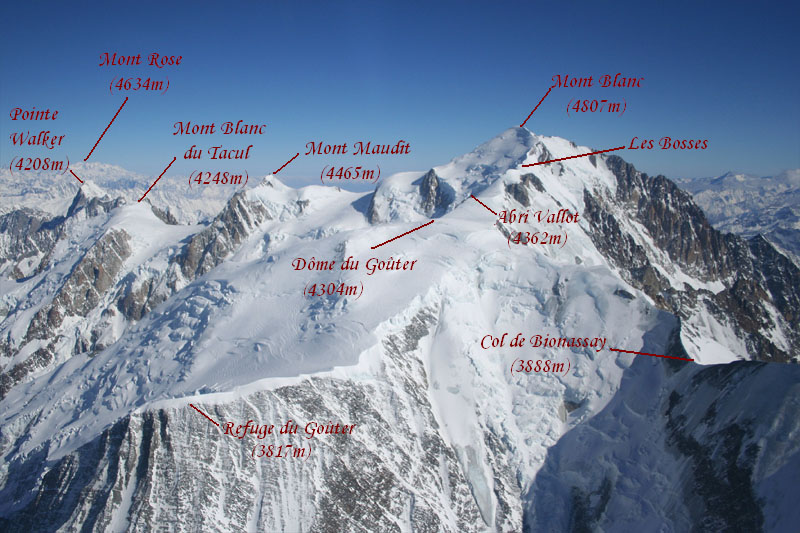
Aerial photo of Mont Blanc and other summits

Mont Maudit (4,465 m) is a mountain in the Mont Blanc massif in France and Italy. The French name literally means "Cursed Mountain". Until the end of the 18th century, Mont Blanc and its satellite peaks were collectively known in French as the Montagne Maudite.

== Climbing history ==
The first ascent of Mont Maudit was by a British party comprising Henry Seymour Hoare and the lawyer/diplomat William Edward Davidson with guides Johann Jaun and Johann von Bergen on 12 September 1878. The route they took was via the south ridge, during an ascent of Mont Blanc by the Corridor route.

The southern side of the mountain is considerably steeper than the gentle snow slopes of the northern side and features the well-known southeast or Frontier ridge (also known as the Kuffner ridge, D). This route was first climbed by Moriz von Kuffner with guides Alexander Burgener and Josef Furrer from 2–4 July 1887. George Mallory, in a party led by R. L. G. Irving, made the third ascent of the route in 1911. Ascents of the ridge start from the hut on the Col du Trident and take at least seven to eight hours.

== 2012 avalanche ==
On 12 July 2012, at least nine climbers—three from the United Kingdom (including Roger Payne, a mountain guide and former general secretary of the British Mountaineering Council), two from Switzerland, two from Germany, and two from Spain—were killed by an avalanche as they attempted a dawn ascent of the mountain from the Refuge des Cosmiques. Nine others were injured and flown to hospital. The avalanche struck at 5 am, as the climbers began their climb up one of the most popular, but dangerous, routes up the mountain. Éric Fournier, the mayor of Chamonix–Mont Blanc, described the snowslide as one of the deadliest in recent years. "There was no weather bulletin giving any avalanche warning," he claimed.

== Huts ==
- Refuge des Cosmiques (3,613 m, guarded February–October)
- Abri Simond Bivouac (beside the Refuge des Cosmiques and open in winter when the Refuge is closed)
- Rifugio Torino (3,322 m/3,375 m, 2 huts: a lower and older one and an upper, newer hut, connected by a tunnel)
- Bivacco Lucia e Piero Ghiglione (3,690 m, guarded 20 June–20 September, also known as the Trident hut) - now not there; this bivouac hut was removed in the late 1990s
- Historical: Bivacco Alberico e Brogna (3,679 m, also known as the Bivouac de la Fourche, destroyed in a 2022 landslide)

== See also ==
- List of 4000 metre peaks of the Alps
