= Edward Davidson (lawyer) =

Sir William Edward Davidson, KCMG, CB, KC (17 April 1853 – 12 July 1923) was a British lawyer, civil servant, and alpinist. He was the first Legal Adviser to the Foreign Office as well as the president of the Alpine Club (1911–1913).

Educated at Balliol College, Oxford, Davidson was a student at Lincoln's Inn, but was called to the bar at the Inner Temple in 1879. After a short period on the South Wales Circuit and in the Board of Trade, Davidson became Legal Advisor to the Foreign Office in 1886 (eo nomine from 1892), serving until 1918.

A distinguished alpinist, Davidson was president of the Alpine Club from 1911 until 1913/1914.
